= James McConica =

James McConica may refer to:

- James Kelsey McConica (born 1930), Canadian priest and academic
- Jim McConica (born 1950), American swimmer
