= University of St. Michael's College =

Federated university in Toronto, Canada

- Coat of arms of the university
- Motto: Bonitatem et disciplinam et scientiam doce me (Latin) (or Greek: Ευσέβεια μουσική γυμναστική)
- Motto in English: "Goodness, Discipline, Knowledge" (or "Piety/faith, music/arts, gymnastics")
- Named for: Saint Michael the Archangel
- Type: Federated university
- Established: September 15, 1852 (174 years ago)
- Parent institution: University of Toronto
- Religious affiliation: Catholic Church
- Academic affiliations: Universities Canada
- Endowment: $30.2 million
- Chancellor: Frank Leo
- President: David Sylvester
- Principal: Irene Morra (St. Michael's College)
- Undergraduates: 4,603
- Postgraduates: 245
- Location: 81 St. Mary Street, Toronto, Ontario, Canada; 43°40′00″N 79°23′25″W
- Newspaper: The Mike
- Colours: Blue and white
- Nicknames: Bulldogs, Bay Street Fighting Irish (Historical), "Notre Dame of the North" (Historical)
- Mascot: Basil the Bulldog
- Website: stmikes.utoronto.ca

The University of St. Michael's College (USMC or St. Mike's) is a federated university in the University of Toronto, located on its St. George campus. It was founded in 1852 by the Congregation of St. Basil and retains its Catholic affiliation through its postgraduate theology faculty. Its largest component however is its secular Faculty of Arts and Science known as St. Michael's College, one of the seven undergraduate colleges in the University of Toronto's larger Faculty of Arts and Science.

St. Michael's is most closely associated with teaching and research in the humanities and in theology. It is also known for being home to Marshall McLuhan throughout his influential career as a philosopher and communication theorist, from 1946 until his death in 1980. Both the Pontifical Institute of Mediaeval Studies and Metropolitan Andrey Sheptytsky Institute of Eastern Christian Studies reside within the university. St. Michael's College School is an affiliated boys school which was once the high school section of the university.

== History ==
St. Michael's College was founded in 1852 as a Basilian college by Fr. Jean-Mathieu Soulerin and other members of the Congregation of St. Basil originally of Annonay, France. The following year, it merged with St. Mary's Lesser Seminary under the unified control of the Basilian Fathers, whose establishment in Canada began with Bishop Armand-François-Marie de Charbonnel. St. Michael's College educated pupils at three levels, operating as a preparatory school, as a liberal arts college, and as a minor seminary. The Basilians received a large estate in 1853 from John Elmsley, son of the Chief Justice of Upper Canada and a prominent philanthropist. St. Michael's College relocated to the new site east of the University of Toronto St. George, and established the college parish, St. Basil's Church. The incorporation of the college was granted Royal Assent in 1855.

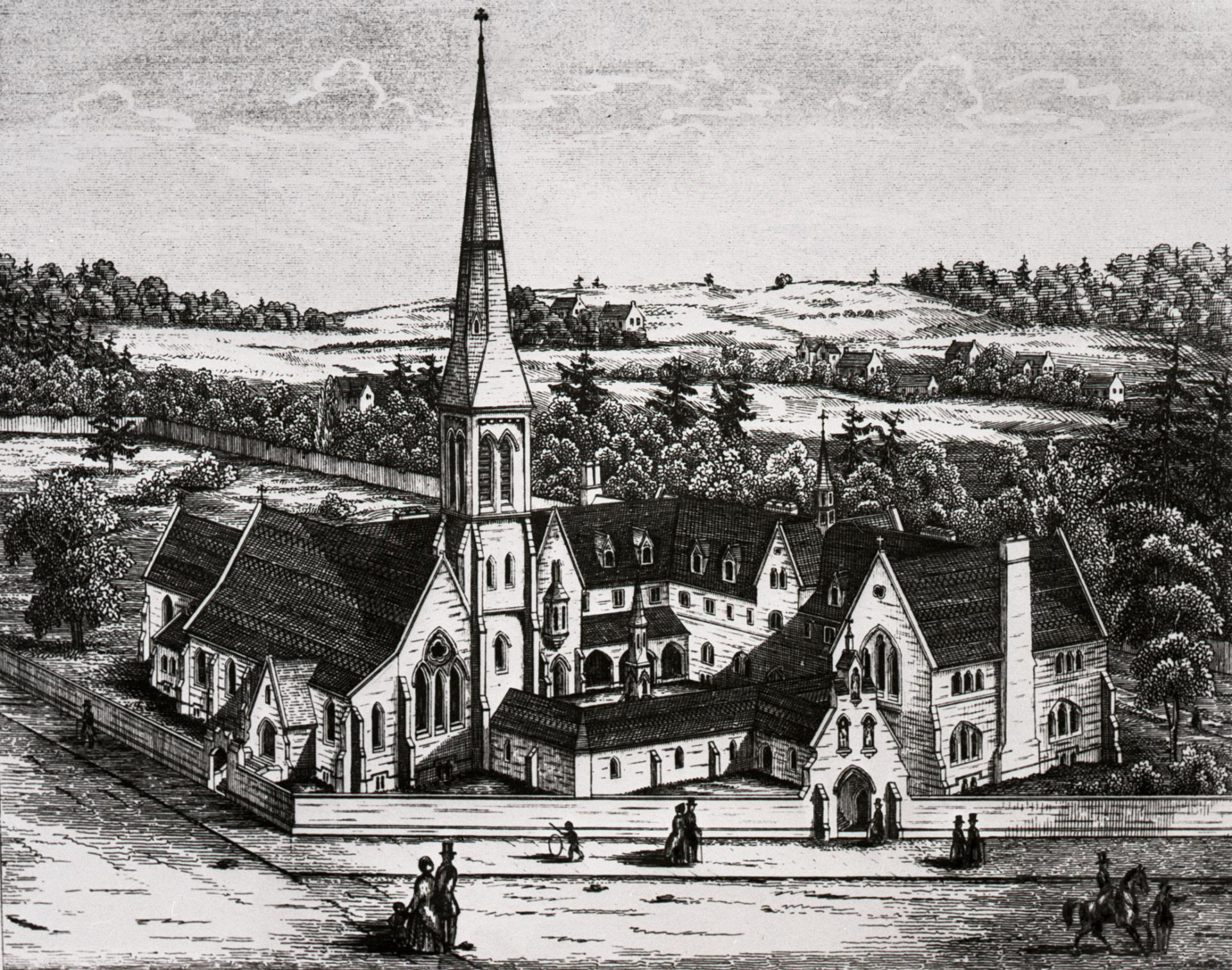
William Hay's original 1855 concept for the college's design

In the late 19th century when universities were closed to new Irish immigrants and many Canadians of Irish descent, St. Michael's was seen as the only viable option and thus the school became a traditionally Irish filled college. Ever since this time St. Michael's has been a bastion for higher education and a beacon for the Irish-Canadian community in Toronto and southern Ontario, with others coming from all over the rest of Canada to attend the dominantly Irish school.

By withdrawing its financial support in 1868, the provincial government encouraged denominational colleges to seek closer relations with secular institutions. St. Michael's affiliated with the University of Toronto in 1883, having secured a guarantee that it would conduct its own teaching in philosophy and history. The university senate authorized St. Michael's to administer its own examinations in philosophy. On December 8, 1910, St. Michael's College became a federated college of the University of Toronto. The college maintained autonomy in faculty hiring and teaching in liberal arts subjects, while the University of Toronto governed examinations and the granting of degrees in all subjects except theology. In 1912, Sir Robert Falconer, president of the University of Toronto, recognized the wish of St. Joseph's College and Loretto College to affiliate with the university. St. Joseph's and Loretto both became colleges of St. Michael's College, thereby allowing their female students to receive University of Toronto degrees.

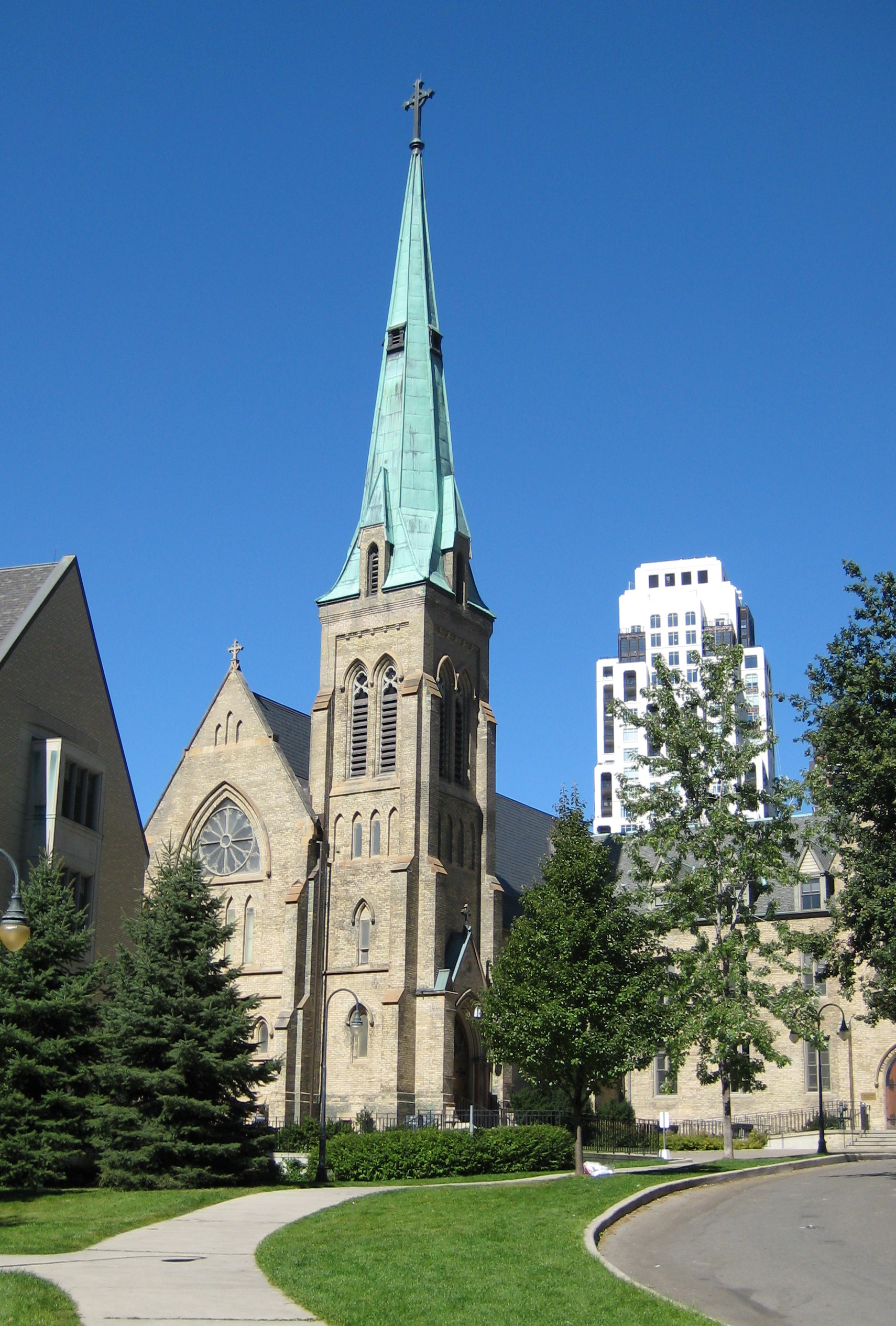
St. Basil's Church, the college parish

As the 20th century began, professional education expanded beyond the traditional fields of theology, law and medicine. Graduate training based on the German-inspired American model of specialized course work and the completion of a research thesis was introduced. With the opening of the Institute of Mediaeval Studies in 1929, St. Michael's expanded further into graduate teaching and research. Ten years later, Pope Pius XII signed a papal charter creating the Pontifical Institute of Mediaeval Studies.

The preparatory school division of the college was reorganized in 1950 as St. Michael's College School, an independent private school, ending the college's direct governance while maintaining its affiliation. In 1952, the last lectures for women were held at Loretto and St. Joseph's Colleges, which became residential units of the college. Thereafter, all teaching was conducted coeducationally in the classrooms of St. Michael's College.

On July 1, 1958, the University of St. Michael’s College Act granted St. Michael's the status of federated university, and separated into two the roles of the religious chancellor and secular president of the institution.

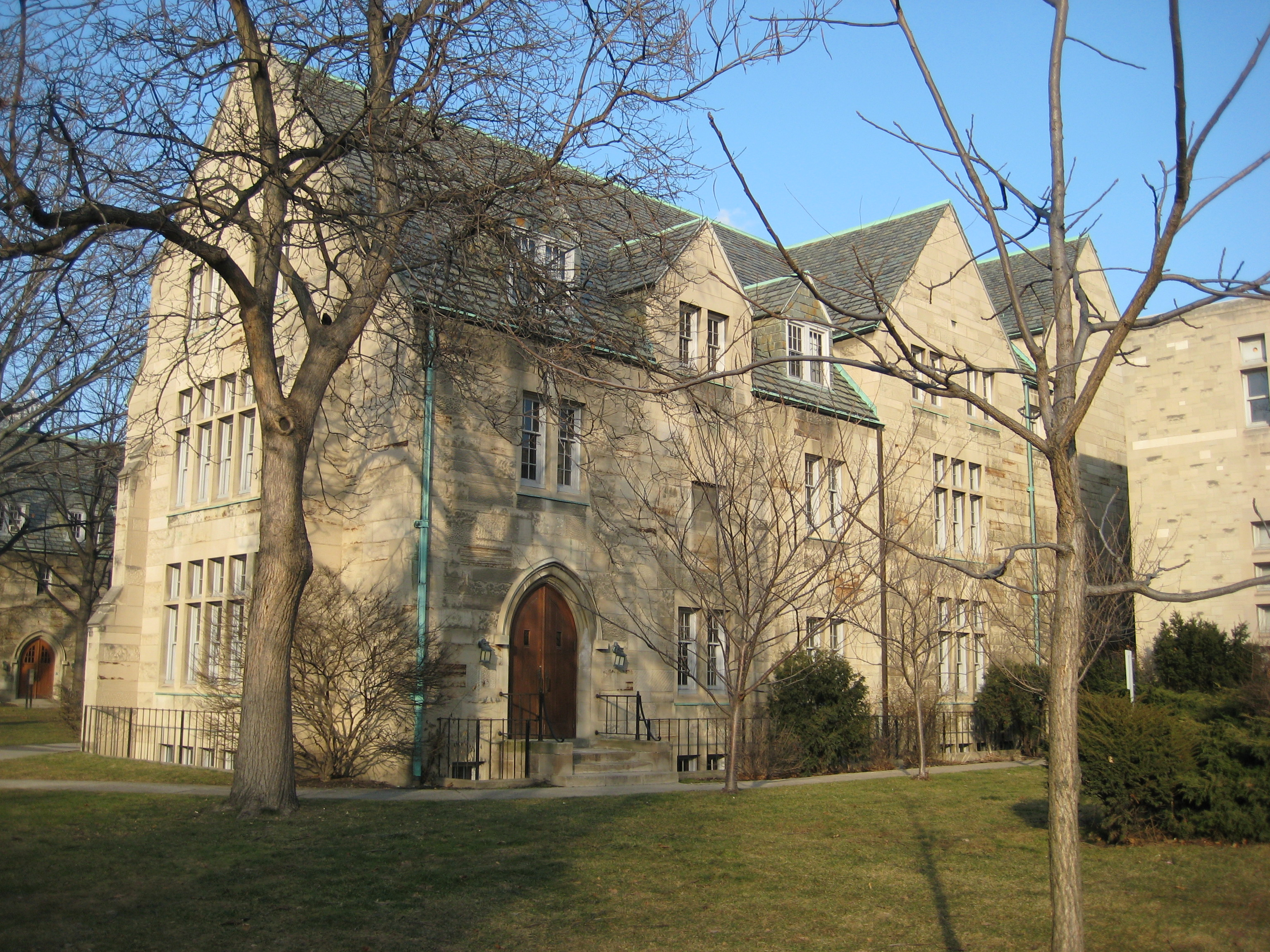
Teefy Hall, built in 1935

Throughout much of its history, St. Michael's benefited from a common practice whereby staff and faculty who were members of religious orders would donate their salaries back to the college. This source of income gradually disappeared as new faculty members were hired with mainly secular backgrounds, compelling the college to seek new revenue. The college's first modern fundraising attempt was launched in 1927, but was only partly successful due to the onset of the Great Depression. The Basilian Fathers of St. Michael's College was registered as a charitable organization in 1972. Subsequent campaigns and land sales allowed the University of St. Michael's College to gradually increase its endowment, expand its academic programs and construct new residence buildings. The Canadian Catholic Bioethics Institute became affiliated with the university in 2001. In 2002, the university marked the sesquicentennial of its founding with an anniversary mass held in St. Basil's Church.

== Campus and buildings ==
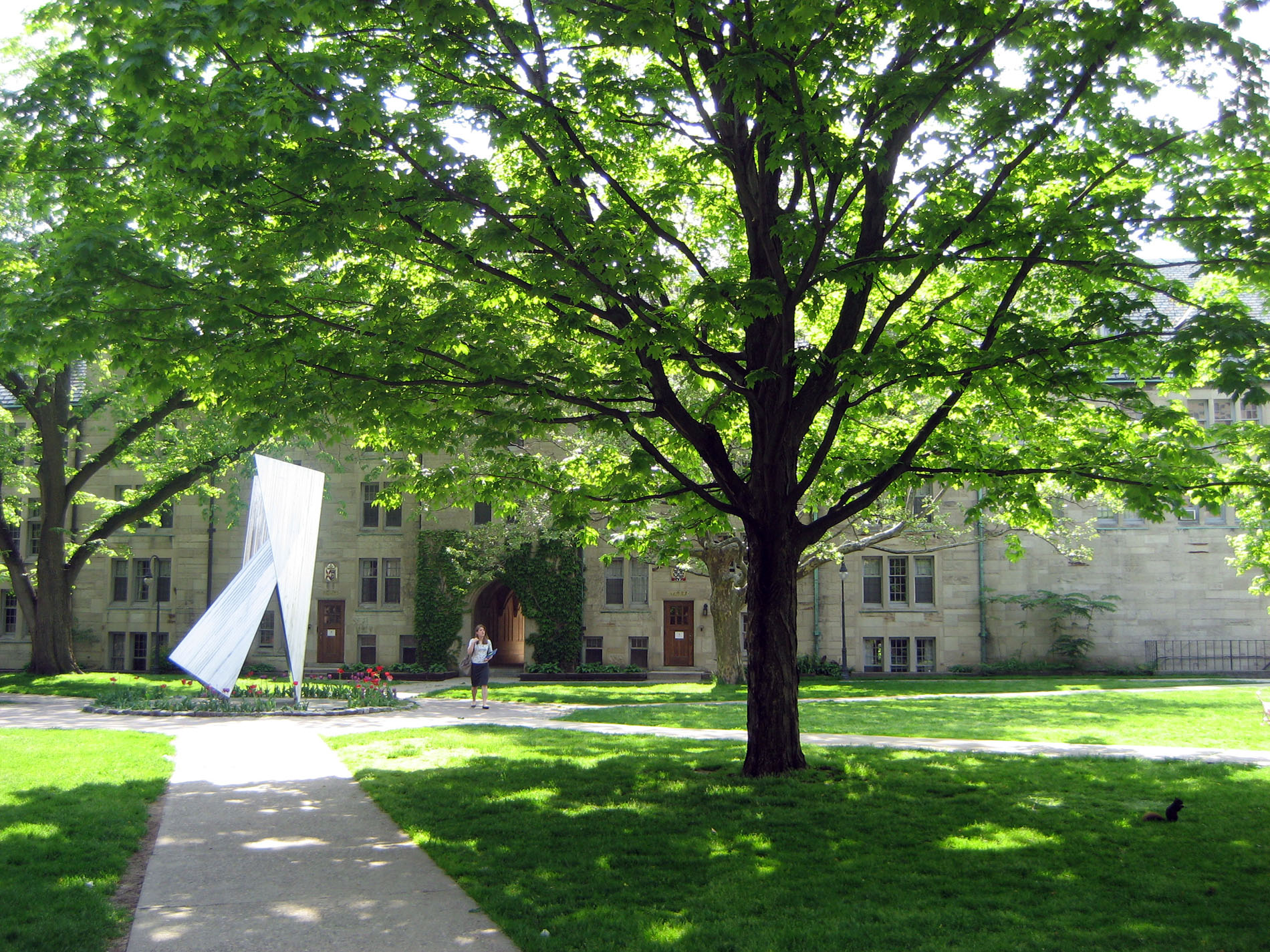
At the centre of the main college quadrangle is a sculptural representation of Saint Michael.

The oldest buildings of St. Michael's College were constructed on the original Clover Hill estate donated by John Elmsley, and were designed by noted Scottish architect William Hay. With subsequent land acquisitions in 1890, 1920, 1926 and 1928, the college expanded from Clover Hill westward to reach Queen's Park. The present grounds of the University of St. Michael's College form the eastern end of the University of Toronto's St. George campus, with Victoria University to the north and Regis College to the south. The main St. Michael's quadrangle is in the northwestern section of the university grounds, with its northern side leading into Victoria University.

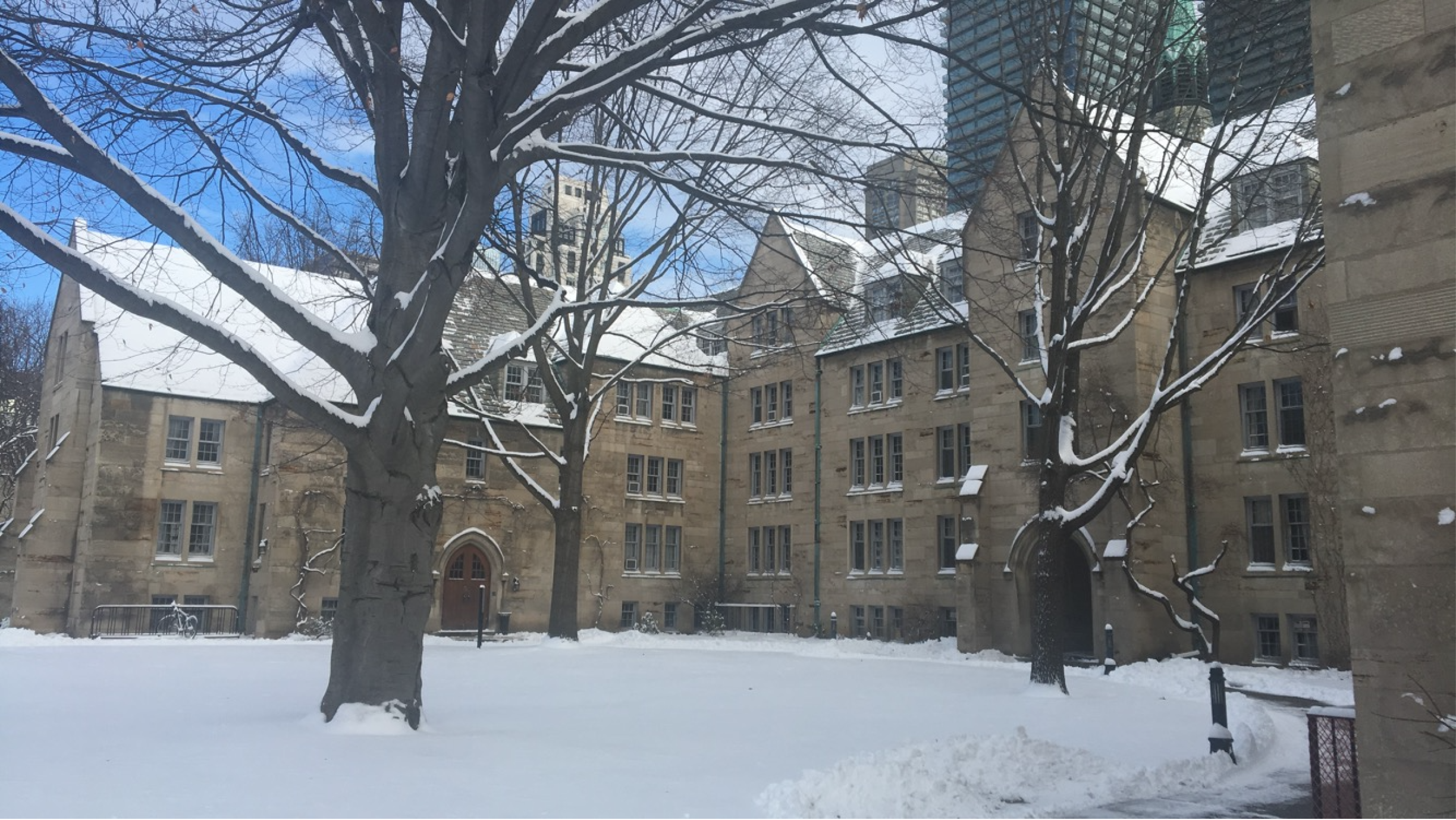
Queen's Park Buildings in winter

The cornerstone was laid at Clover Hill on September 16, 1855, for the college building and the college parish of St. Basil's Church, which was consecrated November 16, 1856 with a Pontifical High Mass. This building is the oldest building at the University of Toronto in continuous academic use. A further addition, designed by William Irving, was constructed between 1872 and 1873 to house an auditorium, classrooms and student residence. In 1996, the original building was completely renovated by Carlos Ott Partnership Architects and renamed Odette Hall, and a modern religious art gallery donated by Fr. Daniel Donovan was installed on the two lower floors.

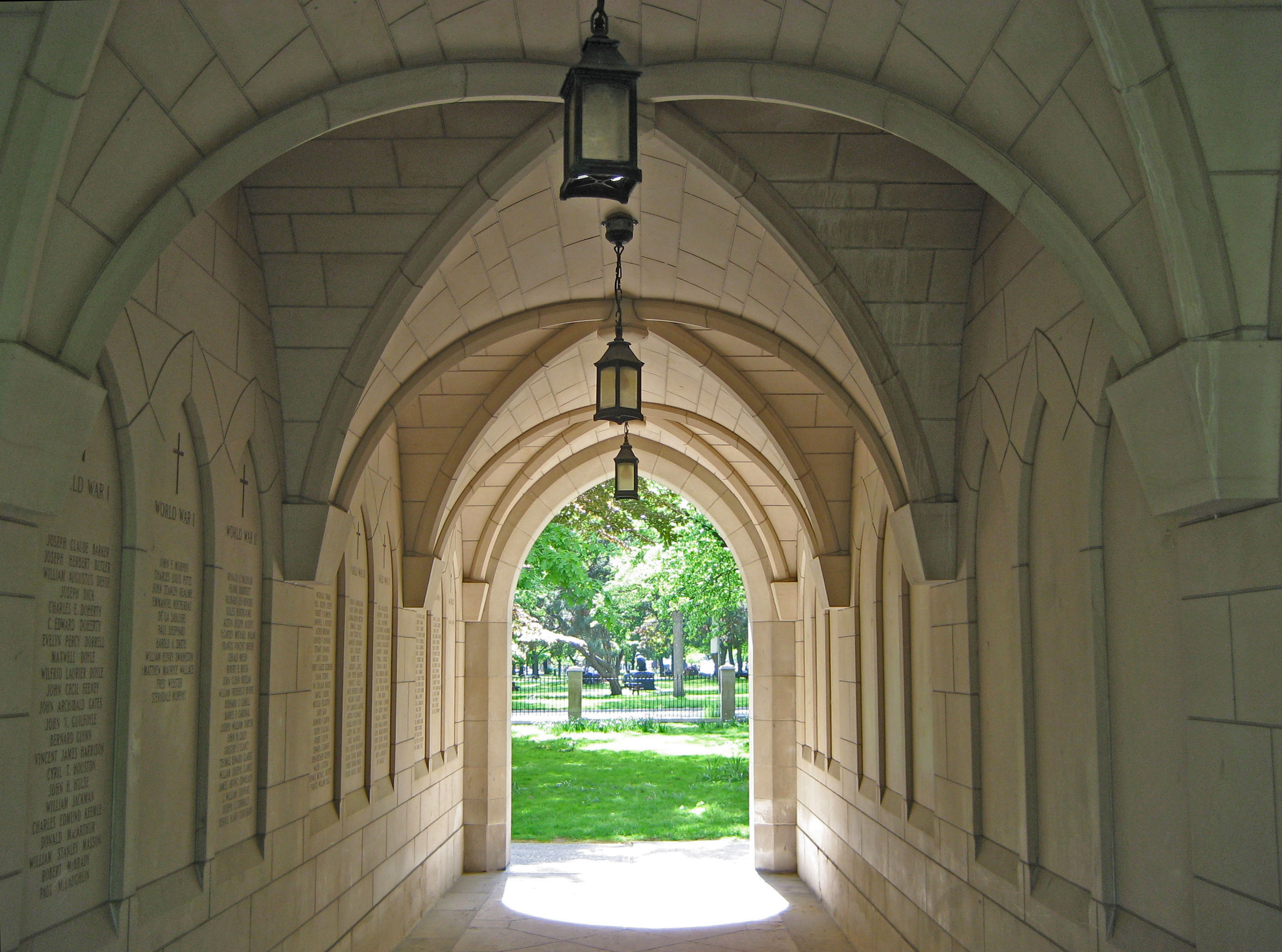
The Soldier's Memorial Slype connects the quadrangle with Queen's Park.

The master plan and Collegiate Gothic complex of buildings at the western side of the college nearest to Queen's Park were built in 1935 and designed by architect Arthur William Holmes in Gothic revival style: the Pontifical Institute, More House, Fisher House, Brennan Hall (1938) and Teefy Hall (1935–1936) and extension of the East Wing, (1902–1903). Brennan Hall in the north-central section of campus contains a dining hall, faculty dining room, common rooms, and guestrooms. The small park between Brennan Hall and St. Basil's Church is known as Scollard Park, named for St. Michael's alumnus Fr. Robert Scollard.

Fisher House and More House both began as residences for men, while classrooms and faculty offices were located in Teefy Hall to the south. The Queen's Park Building to the north was built for the Pontifical Institute of Mediaeval Studies. A student-faculty centre was built in 1968 as an extension of Brennan Hall.

The Soldier's Memorial Slype connects the university quadrangle with Queen's Park, its sandstone walls etched with the names of St. Michael's College alumni who died in the World Wars and the Korean War.

Examples of early post-war architecture at the university include Carr Hall, designed by Ernest Cormier and built in 1954, housing faculty and administrative offices, classrooms and an auditorium. At the northern edge of campus, Elmsley Hall was built in 1955 as a men's residence and a new residence for the Loretto College was built in 1958. The brutalist concrete building of the John M. Kelly Library was opened in 1969, at the southern portion of the university on St. Joseph Street. The former Ontario Research Council building next to the library has been redesigned with classrooms and offices as the Muzzo Family Alumni Hall.

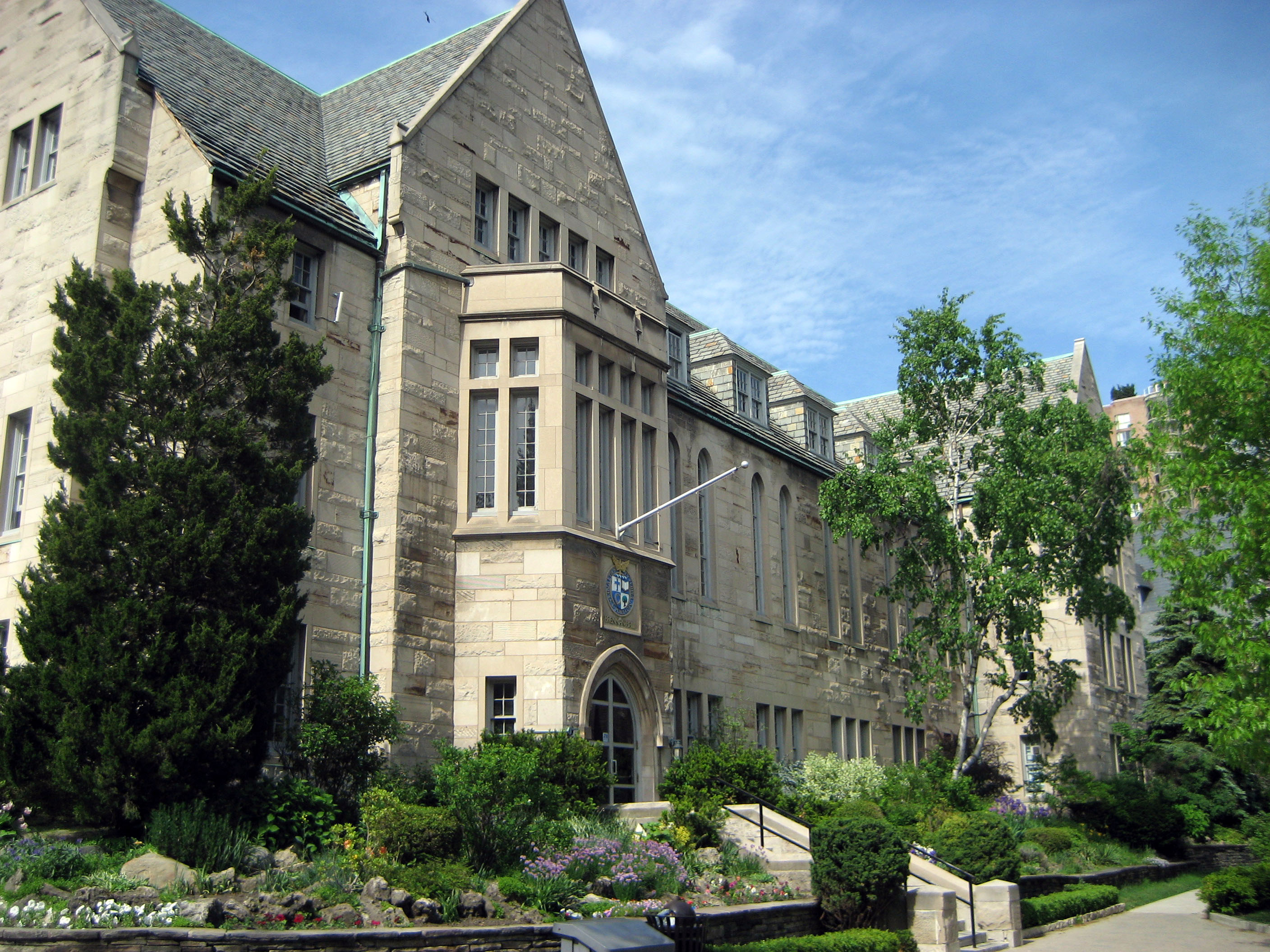
Brennan Hall

A private tree-lined street, named Elmsley Place, runs up the centre of the university's campus, connecting St Joseph Street to Brennan Hall. This street, laid out around the turn of the 20th century, is flanked by a group of five beautiful brick Victorian mansions that constituted Toronto's first subdivision. On the west side of Elmsley Place, heading south to north, stands McCorkell and Sullivan House (also known as Houses 2 and 96), and Gilson and Maritain House (also known as Houses 6 and 8). Both are student residences. On the east side of Elmsley Place, heading south to north, are Founders House, Phelan House, and Windle House. Founders House, at one point a student residence known as Bellisle House, is currently home to the office of the university's president, as well as other administrative offices. Phalen House serves as the rectory for the Basilian priests who oversee neighboring St. Basil's parish. Windle House, at the northeast corner of the street, is home to the Metropolitan Andrey Sheptytsky Institute of Eastern Christian Studies.

In addition to St. Basil's, the university is home to several other sacred spaces. A small Roman Catholic chapel is located on the first floor of Elmsley Hall and is open to residents. The Ukrainian Catholic Chapel of St. Sophia, which is operated as part of the Sheptytsky Institute, is located on the lower floor of Elmsley Hall and offers daily services in the Byzantine Rite. A chapel dedicated to the Coptic tradition is located on the upper floor of Windle House. The Dante Garden sculpture park is also located on the southwest corner of the campus.

== Academics ==
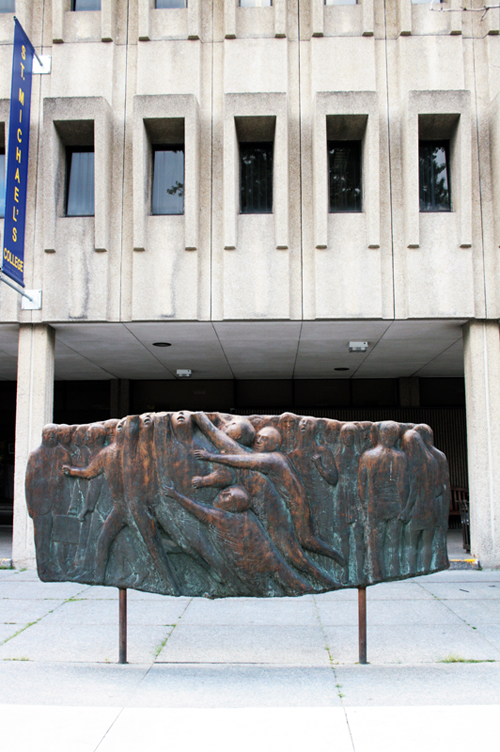
Entrance of the Kelly Library, featuring Untitled by William McElcheran

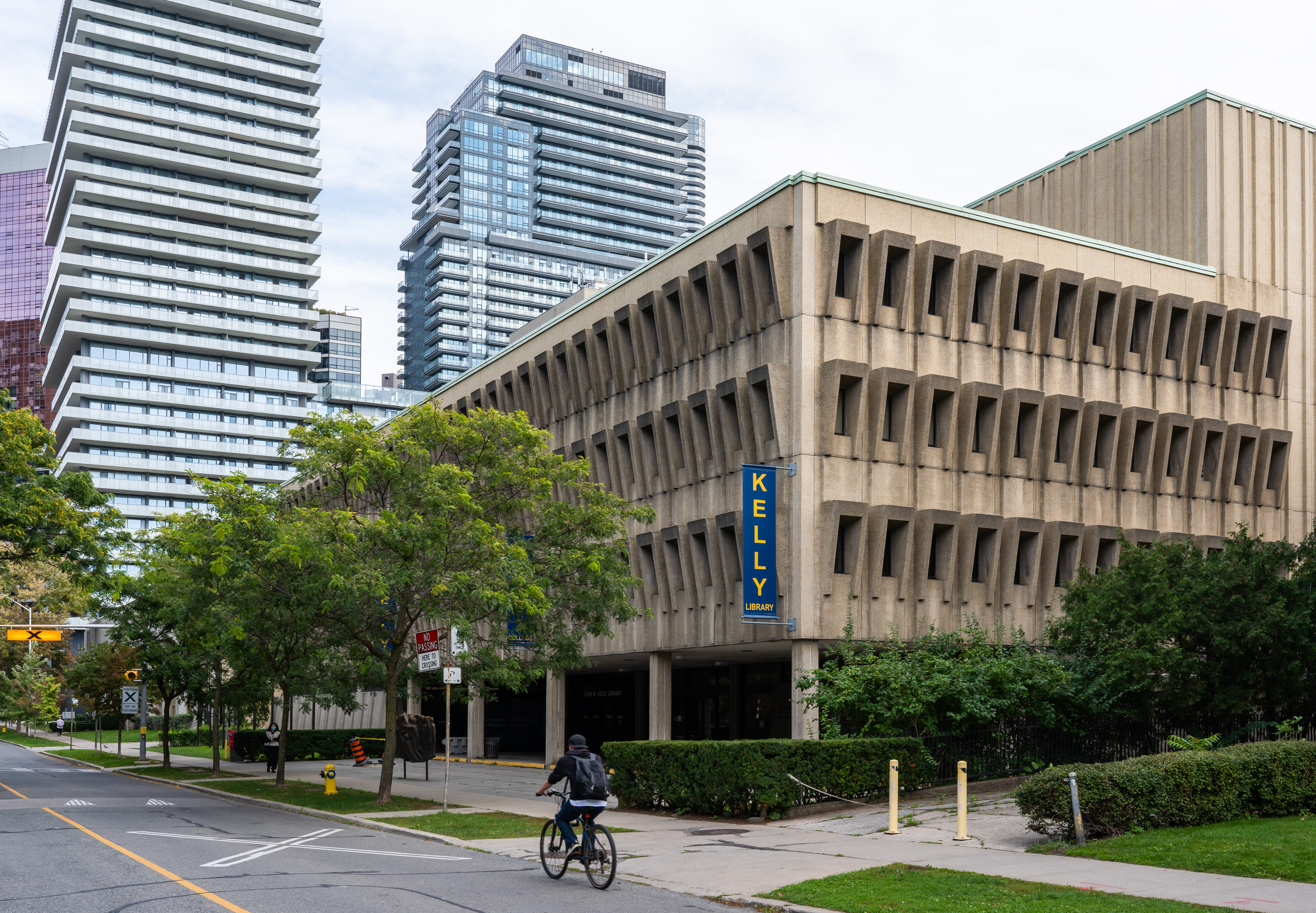
John M. Kelly Library

The University of St. Michael's College comprises the Regis St. Michael's Faculty of Theology, a Division of Continuing Education, and an undergraduate Faculty of Arts and Science, better known as St. Michael's College. Within the University of Toronto Faculty of Arts and Science, St. Michael's College sponsors the academic programs of book and media studies, Celtic studies, Christianity and Culture, Mediaeval studies and the Concurrent Teacher Religious Education Program. In 1996, the French and German departments of the University of Toronto took up residence on the St. Michael's campus, followed in 2000 by the departments of Italian and Slavic studies.

After a reorganization in 1954, degrees in theology have been through the Faculty of Theology of St. Michael's College. In 1969, the Faculty of Theology became one of the founding members of the Toronto School of Theology, an ecumenical federation of the theological colleges at the University of Toronto. The undergraduate faculty of the University of St. Michael's College joined the undergraduate divisions of six other University of Toronto colleges in 1974 to reorganize its academic departments into the University of Toronto's Faculty of Arts and Science. In 2005, the Pontifical Institute of Mediaeval Studies ceased to be a division of the University of St. Michael's College and was reconstituted as an affiliated institution of USMC instead.

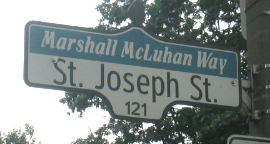
The section of St. Joseph Street in the college is co-named Marshall McLuhan Way.

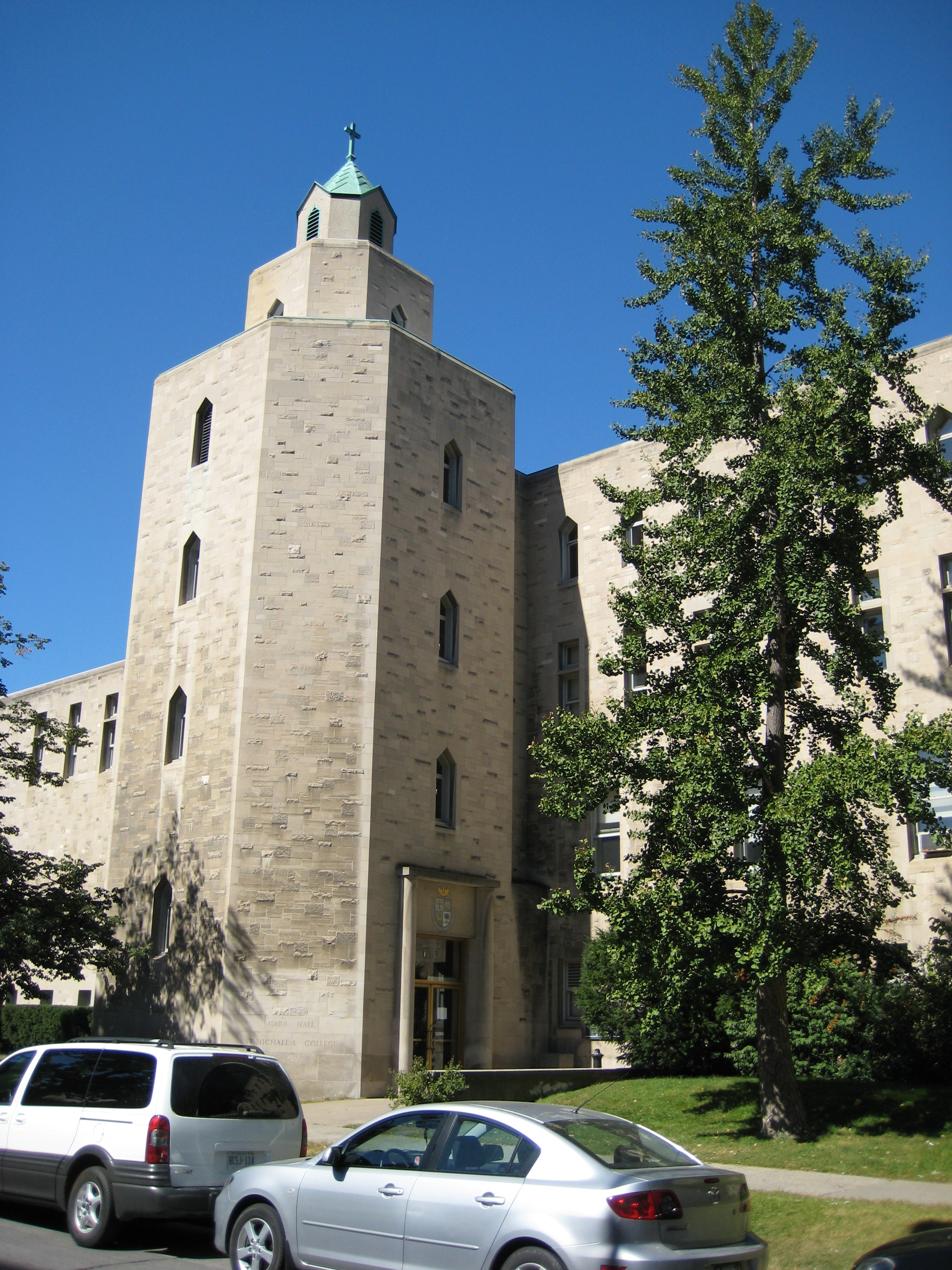
Carr Hall, built in 1954, is among the first post-war buildings at the college.

Marshall McLuhan was hired as a member of faculty at St. Michael's College in 1946, and taught English literature at the university until his death in 1980. During this time he became famous and influential for his books The Mechanical Bride (1951), The Gutenberg Galaxy (1962), and Understanding Media (1964), in addition to his oft-quoted aphorisms on communications and media such as "the medium is the message".

The John M. Kelly Library is the main library at St. Michael's College, and is part of the University of Toronto's mass digitization partnership with the Internet Archive. Although the library building was opened in 1969, the library collection dates back to the earliest days of the university. The collection has since been developed in support of undergraduate programs in the Faculty of Arts and Science, graduate programs in the Faculty of Theology, and programs of the university's continuing education division. In addition to more than 300,000 bookform volumes, the library maintains subscriptions to almost 500 journals and magazines and has the largest suite of public computers on the east side of the St. George campus.

The Kelly Library's collection has representation mainly in the areas of humanities and social sciences, particularly in book history, media studies, philosophy, Celtic history, languages and literature, Canadian history, English literature, and Medieval history. The theological collection emphasizes patristics, early and medieval church history, Thomism, the Bible (especially Canon, Johannine literature, and the history of criticism), liturgical renewal, religious education, and Catholic missions. There are also extensive archival special collections including substantial holdings of G. K. Chesterton, John Henry Newman, early printed books, and the papers of Henri Nouwen and Sheila Watson.

== Governance ==
Since St. Michael's founding in 1852, the school has retained a strong connection to its Roman Catholic roots, in particular, with the Congregation of St. Basil. The university is primarily governed by three offices- the Chancellor, the President, and the Principal. The Chancellor serves as the ceremonial head of the university, and since the days of the institution's founding, the office has been occupied by the Roman Catholic Archbishop of Toronto. Prior to 1954, the office of the President was referred to as the Superior, and was always occupied by one of the Basilian priests from the adjacent St Basil's parish. The position morphed into the current Presidential role once St. Michael's federated into the University of Toronto and re-organized into a university in the 1950s, although several Basilians still held the office following. Today the President heads the administration of the university, and represents its interests in relation to the rest of the University of Toronto and beyond. Founded in 1976, the office of the Principal heads the undergraduate faculty's academics, and retains relations with all the various faculties and departments associated with and located at the university.

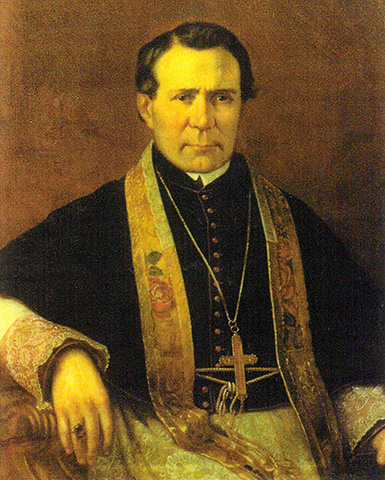
Bishop Charbonnel

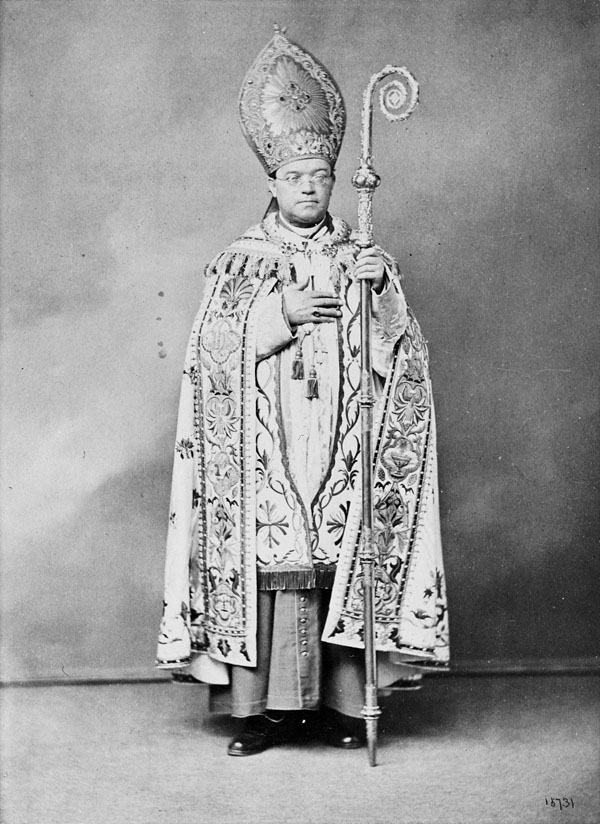
Archbishop Lynch

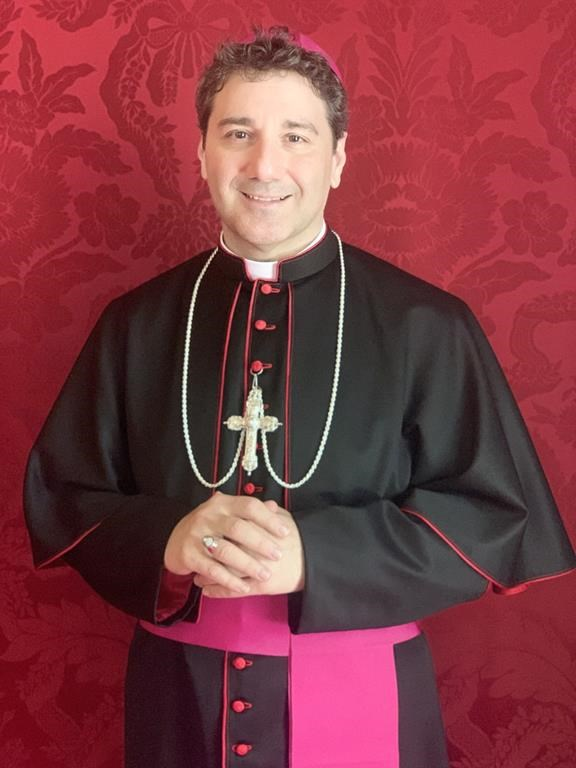
Cardinal Leo

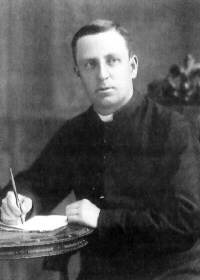
Fr. John R. Teefy, CSB

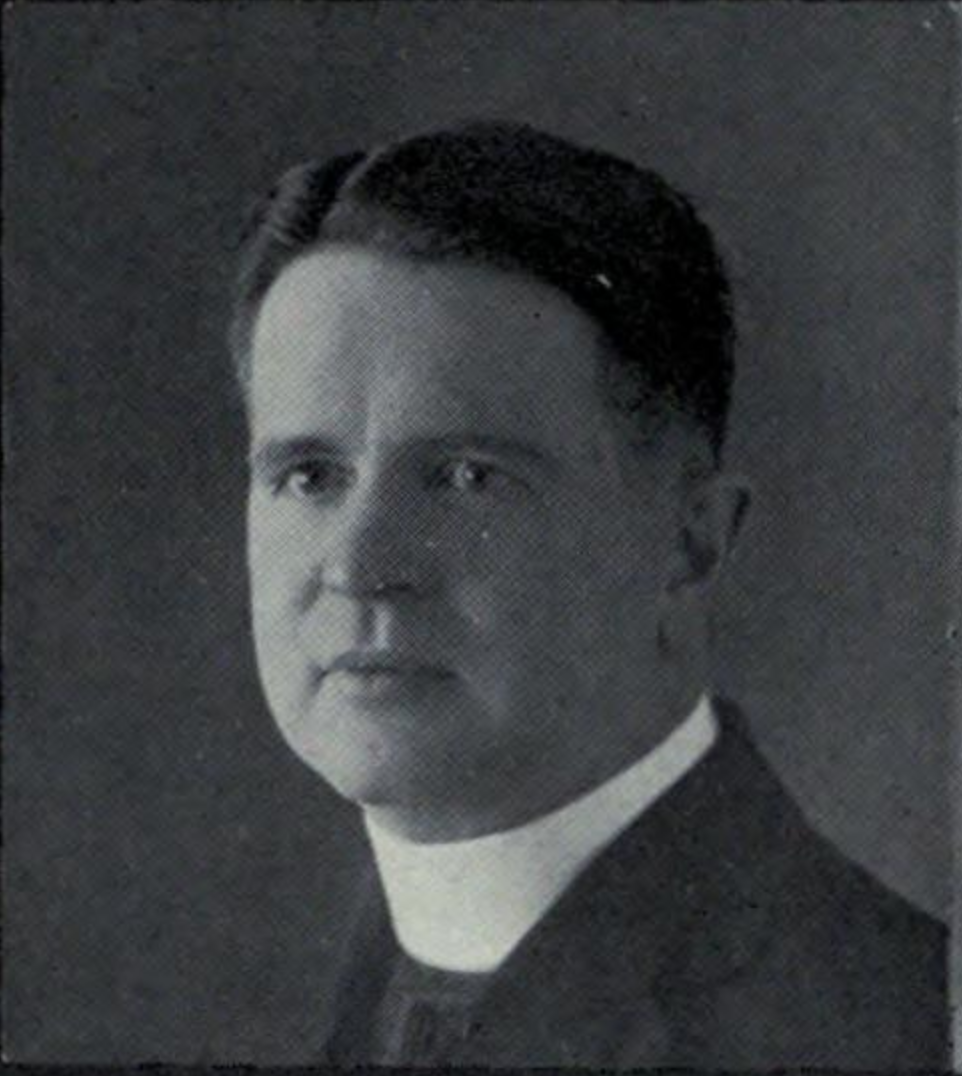
Fr. Henry Carr, CSB

Chancellors of the University of St. Michael's College

- Bishop Armand-François-Marie de Charbonnel (1852–1860)
- Archbishop John Joseph Lynch (1860–1888)
- Archbishop John Walsh (1889–1898)
- Archbishop Denis O'Connor (1899–1908)
- Archbishop Fergus McEvay (1908–1911)
- Archbishop Neil McNeil (1912–1934)
- Cardinal James McGuigan (1934–1971)
- Archbishop Philip Pocock (1971–1978)
- Cardinal Gerald Emmett Carter (1978–1990)
- Cardinal Aloysius Ambrozic (1990–2006)
- Cardinal Thomas Christopher Collins (2006–2023)
- Cardinal Frank Leo (2023–present)

Presidents of the University of St. Michael's College

- Fr. Jean-Mathieu Soulerin, C.S.B. (1852–1865)
- Fr. Charles Vincent, C.S.B. (1865–1886)
- Fr. Daniel Cushing, C.S.B. (1886–1889)
- Fr. John Read Teefy, C.S.B. (1889–1904)
- Fr. Daniel Cushing, C.S.B. (1904–1906)
- Fr. Nicholas Roche, C.S.B. (1906–1910)
- Fr. Francis Gerald Powell, C.S.B. (1910–1911)
- Fr. Thomas James Hayes, C.S.B. (1911–1912)
- Fr. Robert McBrady, C.S.B. (1912–1915)
- Fr. Henry Carr, C.S.B. (1915–1925)
- Fr. Edmund Joseph McCorkell, C.S.B. (1925–1931)
- Fr. Henry Stanislaus Bellisle, C.S.B. (1931–1934)
- Fr. Edmund Joseph McCorkell, C.S.B. (1934–1940)
- Fr. Terence Patrick McLaughlin, C.S.B. (1940–1946)
- Fr. Louis Joseph Bondy, C.S.B. (1946–1952)
- Fr. Lawrence K. Shook, C.S.B. (1952–1958)
- Fr. John M Kelly, C.S.B. (1958–1978)
- Fr. Peter Swan, C.S.B. (1978–1984)
- Fr. James McConica, C.S.B. (1984–1990)
- Dr. Richard Alway (1990–2008)
- Sr. Anne Anderson, S.S.J. (2008–2015)
- Hon. David Mulroney (2015–2018)
- Dr. David Sylvester (2018–present)

Principals of St. Michael's College

- Dr. Laurence Edward Lynch (1976–1981)
- Dr. William B. Dunphy (1981–1991)
- Dr. Joseph Boyle (1991–2002)
- Dr. Mark McGowan (2002–2011)
- Dr. Domenico Pietropaolo (2011–2016)
- Dr. Randy Boyagoda (2016–2020)
- Dr. Mark McGowan (2020–2023)
- Dr. Irene Morra (2023–present)

== Residences and student life ==
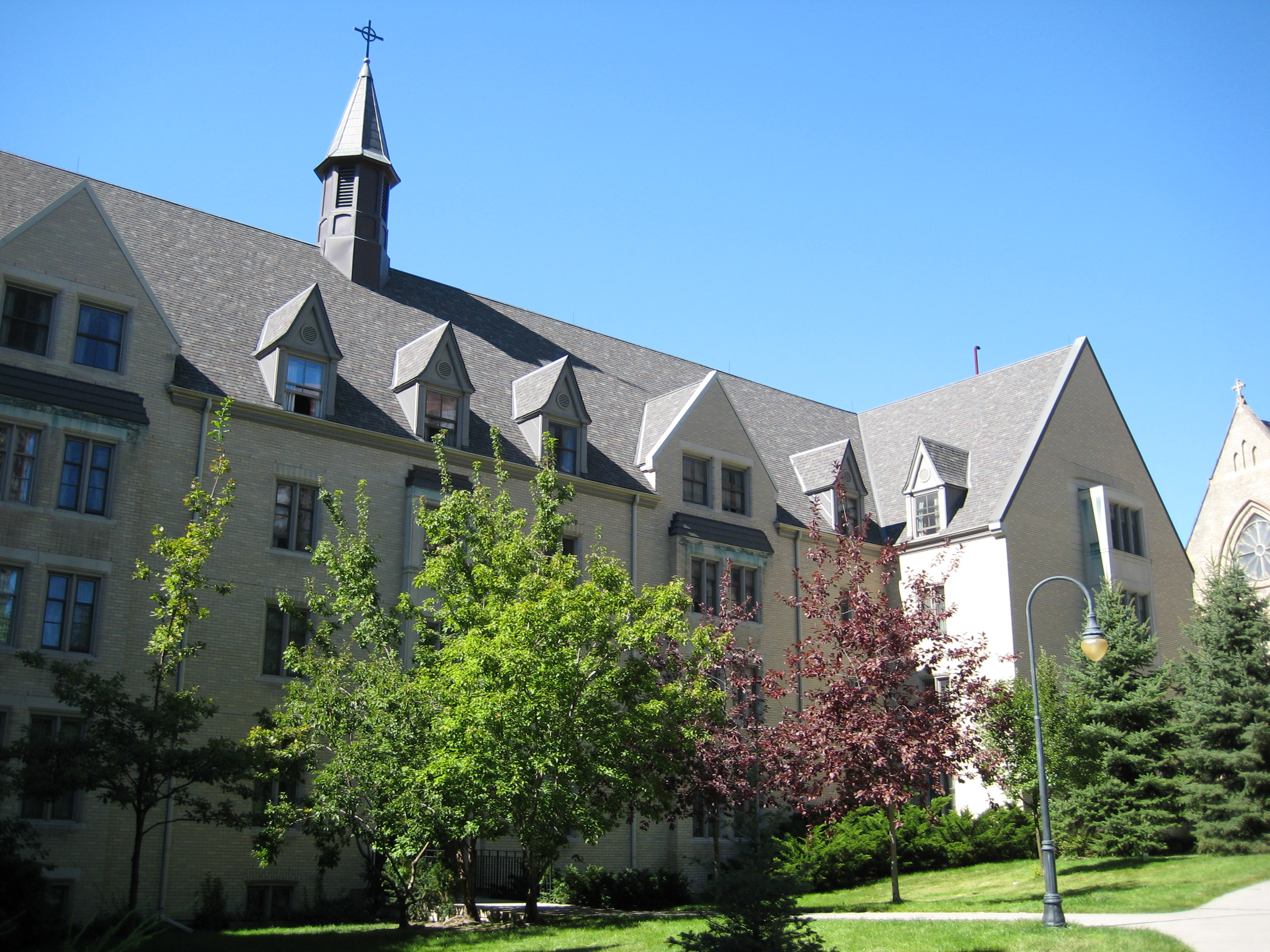
Sorbara Hall, a student residence built in 2000

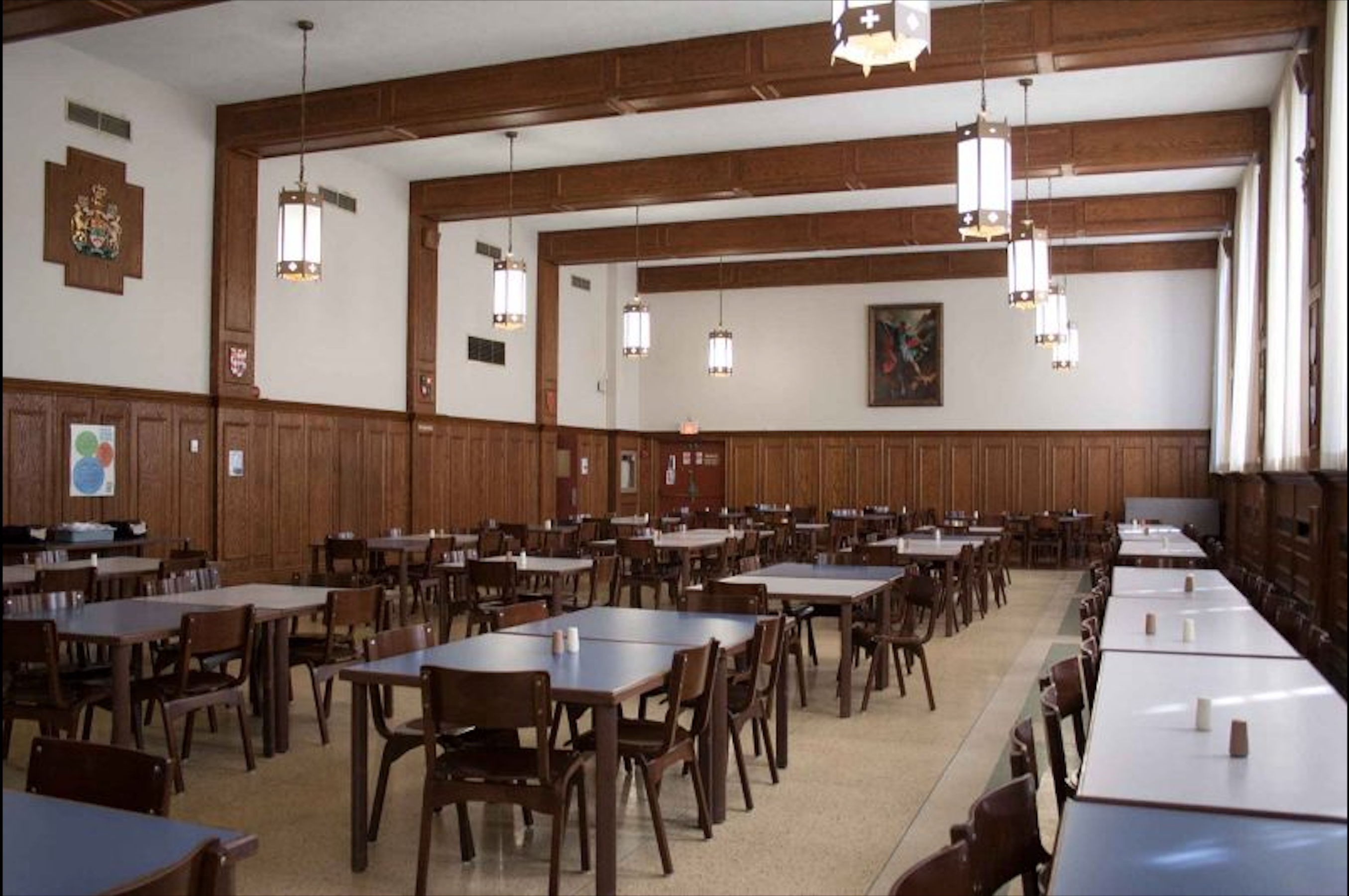
Canada Room Dining Hall, located on the second floor of Brennan Hall

Within the secular environment of the University of Toronto, the Catholic traditions of St. Michael College's are still evident in its college programs, fellows' interests, and student activities. Thus far, the college has largely avoided stirring controversy in its move toward coeducational residences.

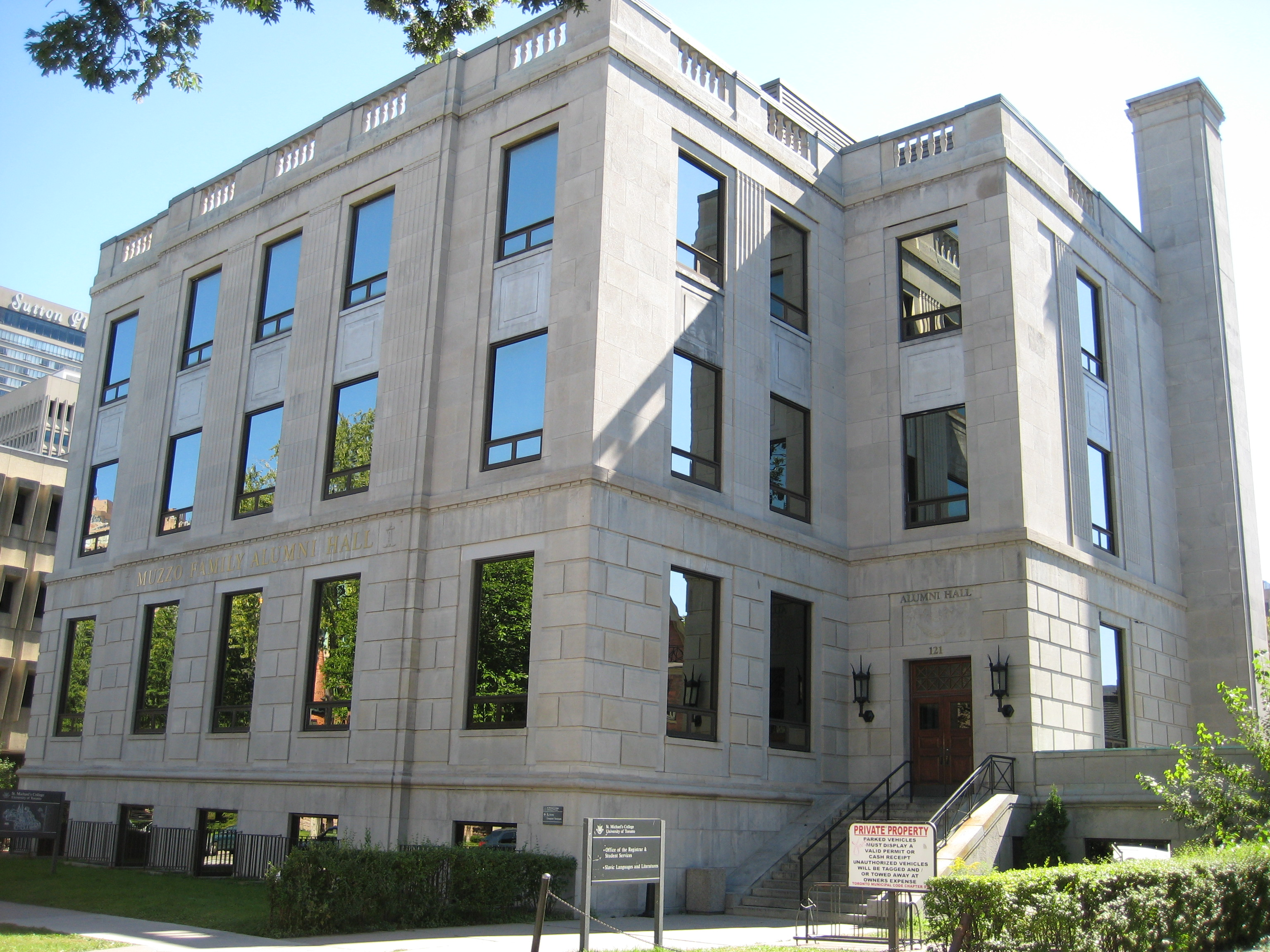
Alumni Hall contains classrooms, offices and a theatre.

Unlike the University of Toronto's other colleges, where most residences are co-ed, the majority of St. Michael's residents reside on single sex floors. However, there are three co-ed residences currently at the college (Historic Houses and Upper Brennan). Female students also have the option to live at the single-sex Loretto College residence; although males are permitted to visit during designated guest hours.

The dons at St. Michael's College are graduate, senior undergraduate and professional faculty students. The college's dining hall, the Canada Room, has recently been expanded and renovated and its hours have been extended.

Within the college, The Dean's Office is responsible for residence operations, residence programming and all aspects of student life at St. Michael's College.

The residences for St. Michael's students are Elmsley Hall Residence (Elmsley First, Mallon House, McBrady House, and Soulerin House), The Queen's Park Residence (Fisher House, More House, and Teefy House), the Historic Houses (McCorkell House, Sullivan House, Gilson House, and Maritain House), Sorbara Hall Residence (Lower Level, Murphy First (unofficial name), Second Floor, Fontbonne House, and Wall House), and Upper Brennan Hall.

Elmsley Hall was renovated in the summer of 2020, included painting and flooring in residence rooms, new furniture and updated common rooms on all floors.

=== Ice hockey at the college ===
St. Michael's College formerly participated in the senior ice hockey division of the Ontario Hockey Association, and won the J. Ross Robertson Cup in 1909 and 1910.

The Toronto St. Michael's Majors in the Ontario Hockey League descended from the college's ice hockey team.

== Notable people ==
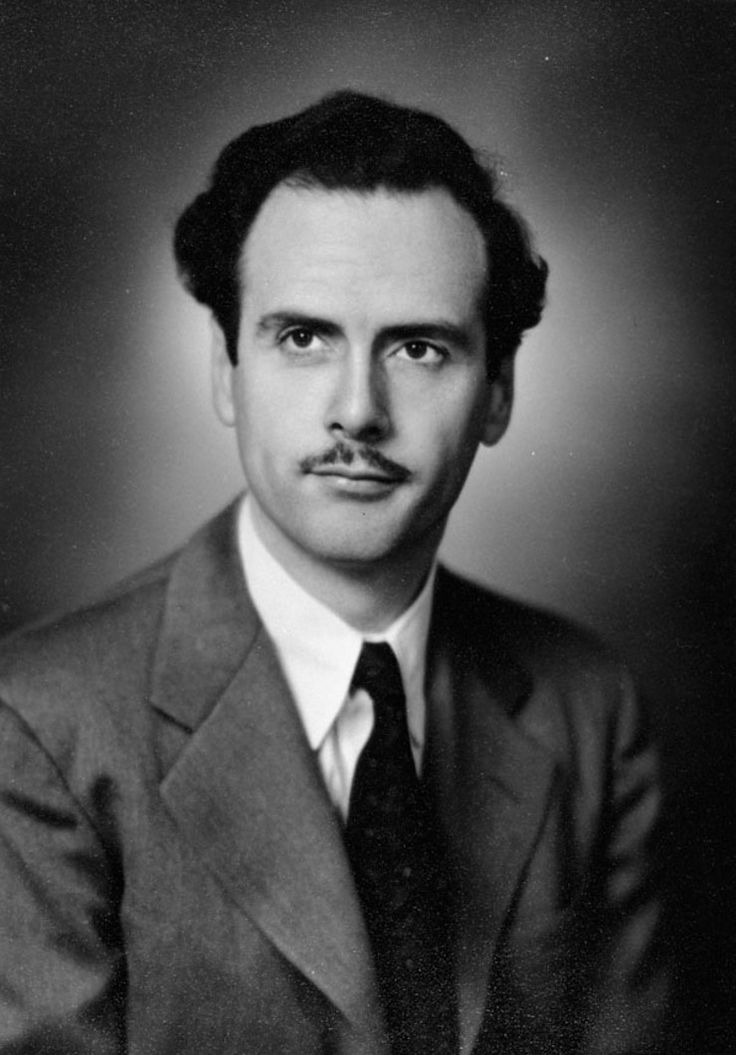
Marshall McLuhan

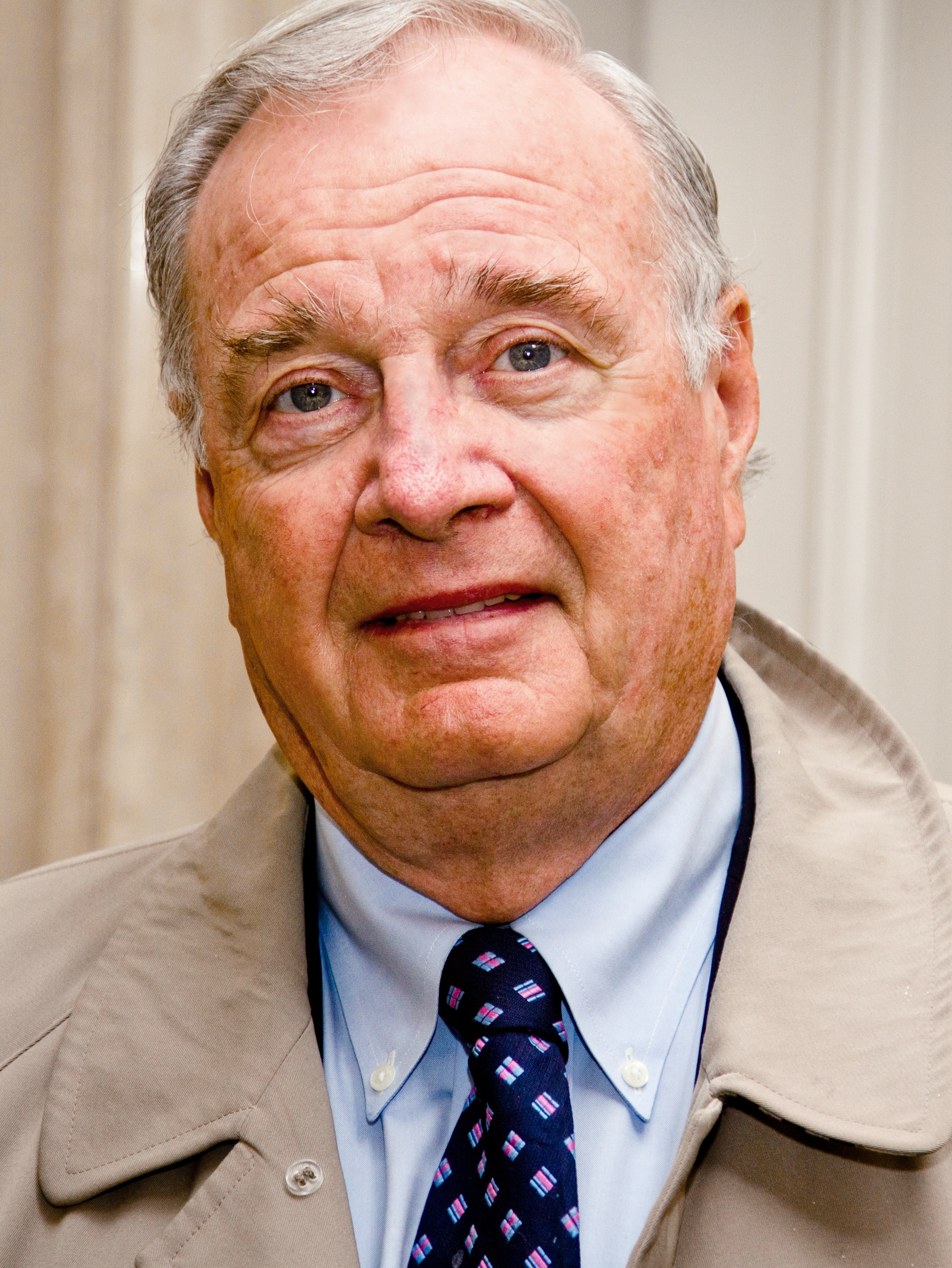
Paul Martin

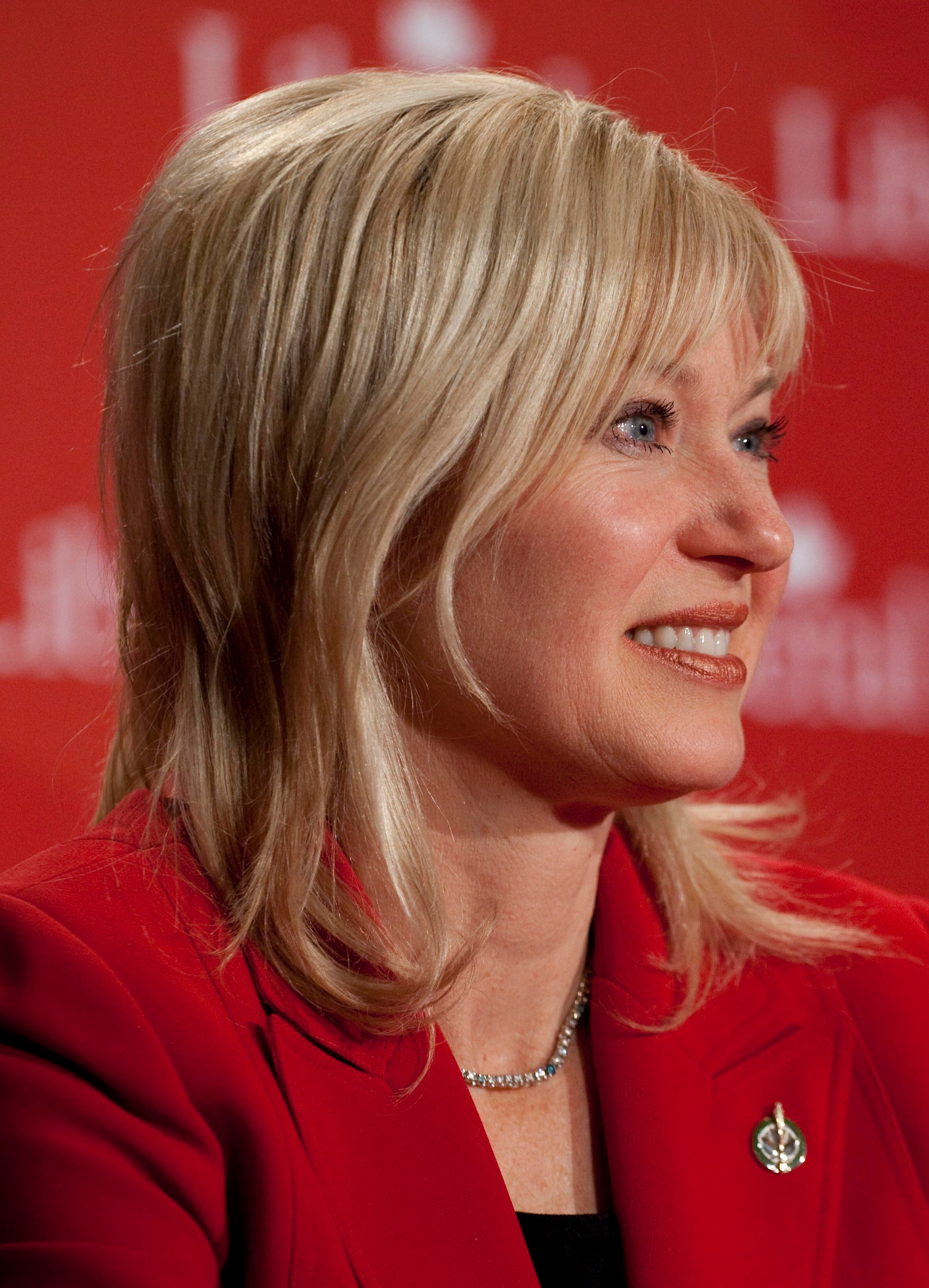
Bonnie Crombie

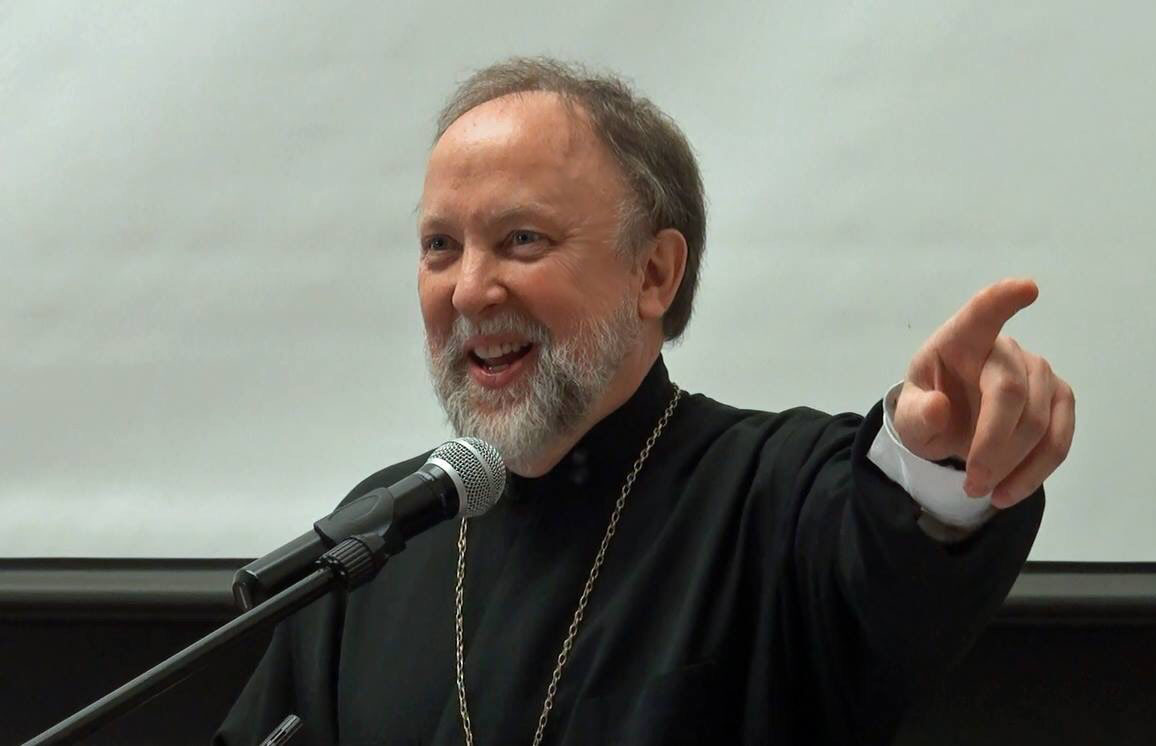
Peter Galadza

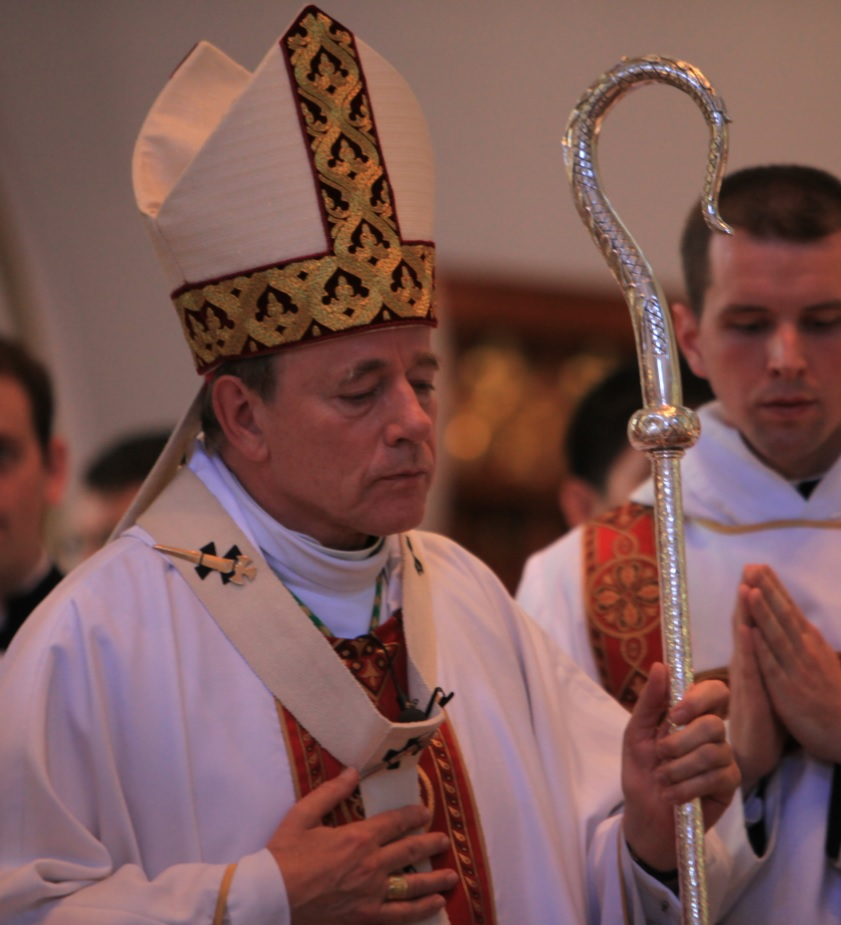
J. Michael Miller

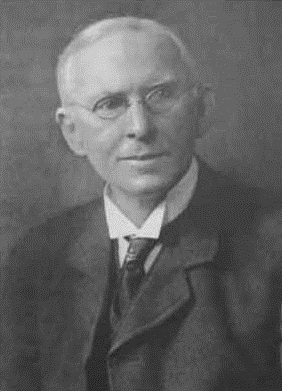
Bertram Windle

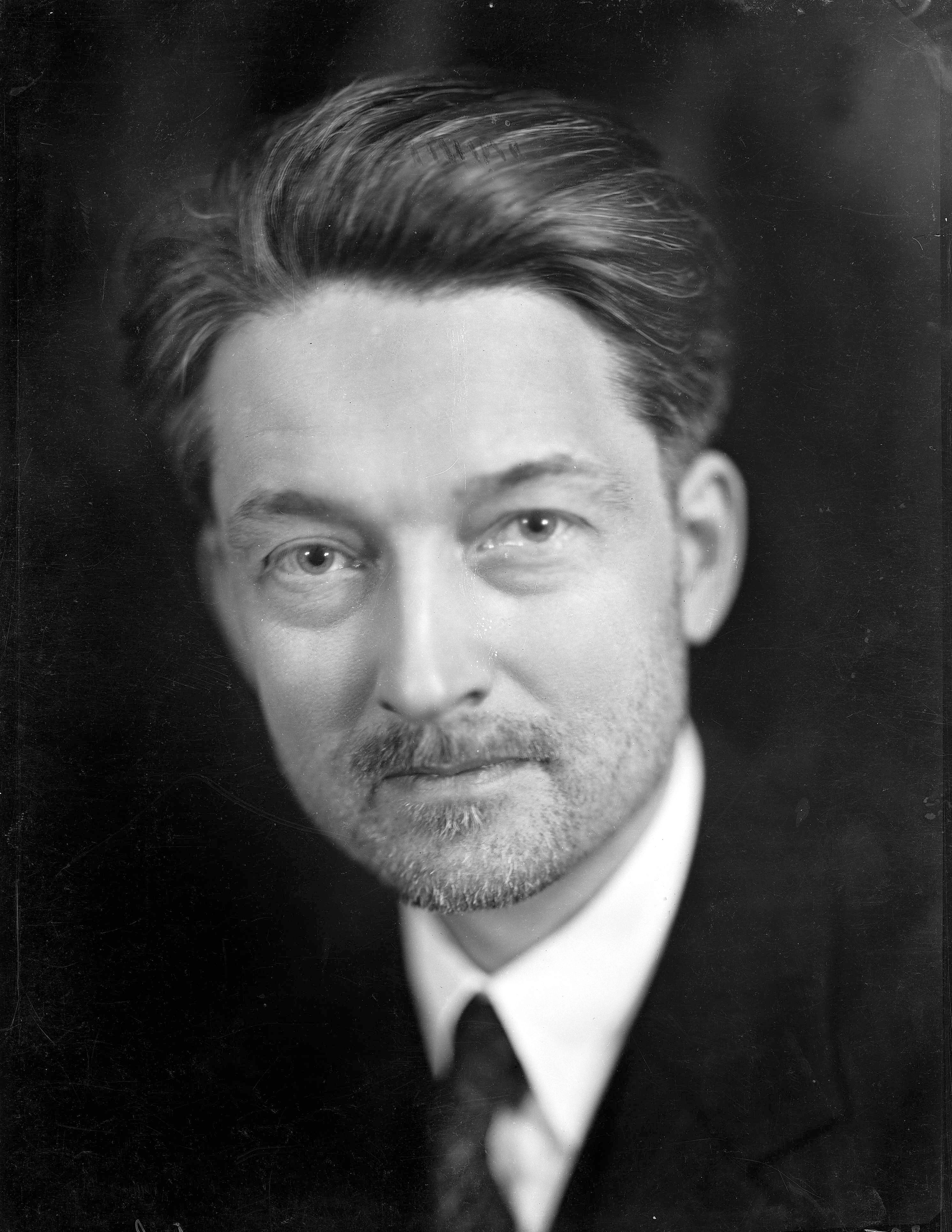
Jacques Maritain

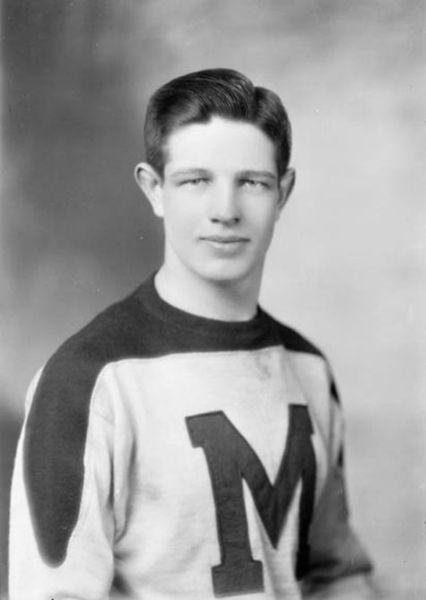
David Bauer

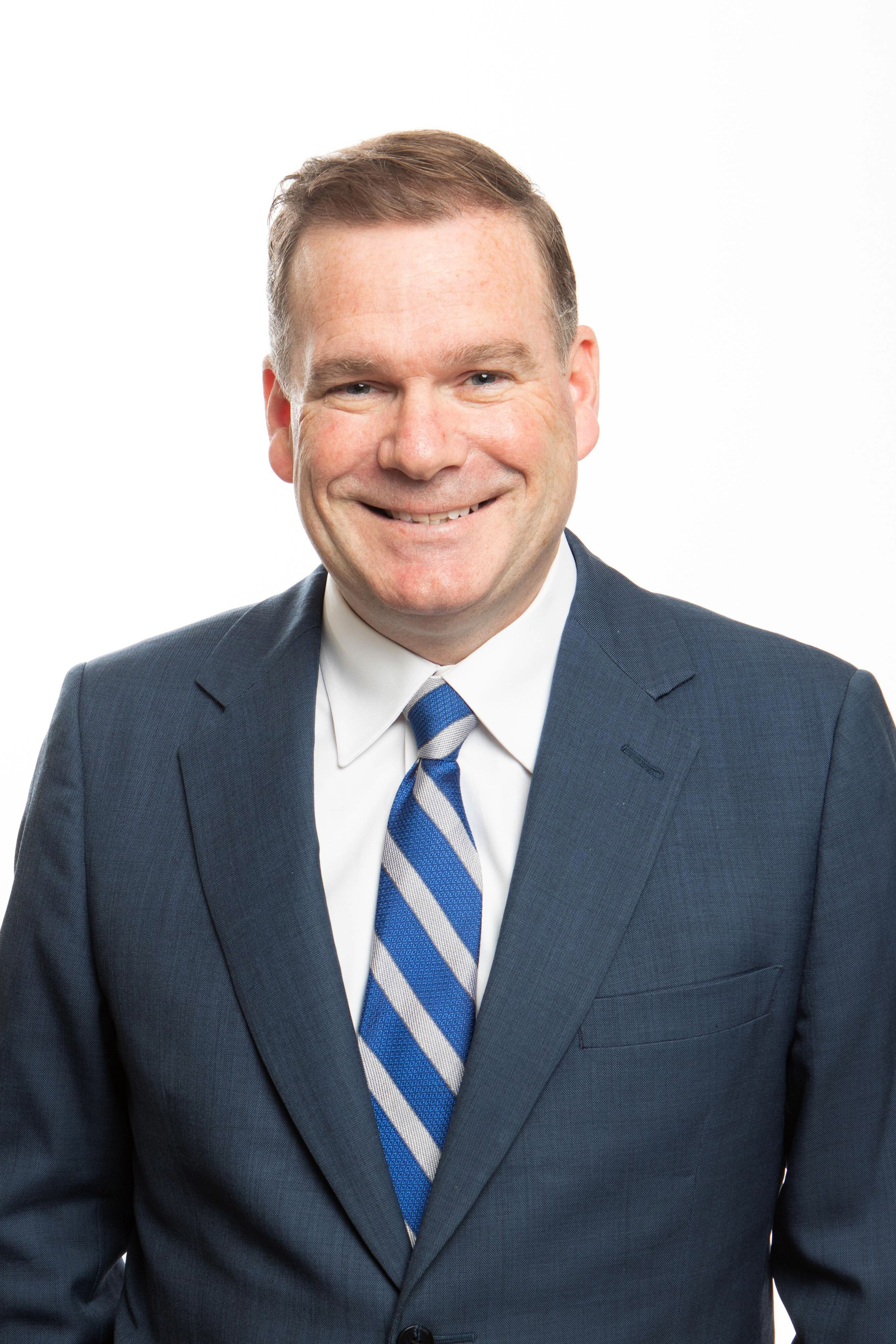
Todd McCarthy

=== Faculty and staff ===
- William Allen, lawyer and chairman of the Metro Toronto Council (1962–1969)
- Richard Alway, administrator and educator
- Dan Bahat, archeologist and professor
- Gregory Baum, theologian, peritus at Vatican II
- Robert Birgeneau, 9th chancellor of the University of California, Berkeley, 14th president of the University of Toronto
- Randy Boyagoda, author and professor
- Fr. Henry Carr, C.S.B., noted Catholic educator and early administrator of St. Michael's College
- Sean Conway, professor and member of the Legislative Assembly of Ontario (1999–2003)
- Davydov, Zakhar Davidovich, philosopher and professor of Slavic studies
- Leslie Dewart, professor of philosophy
- Maurice De Wulf, professor of philosophy and theology
- Fr. Daniel Donovan, professor of theology and notable art collector
- Ann Dooley, professor of Irish literature and Celtic studies
- Peter Galadza, Ukrainian-Greco Catholic priest, liturgist, and director emeritus of the Metropolitan Andrey Sheptytsky Institute of Eastern Christian Studies
- Étienne Gilson, philosopher and historian
- Willi Goetschel, professor of philosophy and German
- Mark Kingwell, philosopher and professor at the University of Toronto
- Christina Kramer, professor of Balkan and Slavic languages and literature
- Ellen Leonard, professor of theology
- Robert K. Logan, academic and media ecologist
- Michael Lynch, professor of American literature and activist
- Dave Mann, football player and St. Michael's intramurals coach
- Jacques Maritain, philosopher
- Marshall McLuhan, professor of English literature and prominent media critic
- Bruce Meyer, professor and poet
- David Mulroney, diplomat and national foreign policy advisor, Canadian Ambassador to China (2009–2012).
- Denis O'Connor, Archbishop of Toronto (1899–1908) and college administrator.
- Robert O'Driscoll, writer and professor of English
- Margaret O'Gara, theologian and ecumenist
- Thomas Pangle, political theorist
- John Peter Portelli, poet and professor
- Fr. Walter Principe, C.S.B., First Dean of Theology, member of International Theological Commission
- Alexander Reford, historian and Dean of St. Michael's College (1987–1995)
- Yves Roberge, professor of French
- Anna Shternshis, professor of Yiddish and German
- Fr. Joean-Mathieu Soulerin, C.S.B., professor and early administrator of St. Michael's College
- David Sylvester, historian and president of St. Michael's College
- Emoke Szathmary, 10th president of the University of Manitoba
- Fr. John Read Teefy, C.S.B., president of St. Michael's College, journalist, and first editor of The Catholic Register
- Victor Togni, organist and choirmaster for St. Michael's College
- Jean Vanier, professor of theology and philosophy, founder of L'Arche
- Sir Bertram Windle, biologist, archeologist, and professor

=== Alumni ===
Academia and education
- John Bolt, Dutch Reformed theologian
- Vernon Bourke, philosopher and professor. Also taught at St. Michael's College
- E.K. Brown, professor and literary critic
- Andrew Carnie, scholar of Celtic languages and professor at the University of Arizona
- Fr. Joseph Cassidy, S.J., theologian and academic administrator
- John W. Cudmore, surgeon and US Army major general
- Fr. John P. Dourley, priest, philosopher, and professor
- Rosemary Ganley, educator and journalist
- Colleen Hanycz, president of La Salle University
- Michael W. Higgins, theologian and academic
- Gregory Kealey, historian and academic
- Hugh Kenner, literary scholar and academic
- John S. Kloppenborg, theologian and academic
- Grace Ji-Sun Kim, theologian and academic
- Eugene Carlisle LeBel, notable academic and religious leader
- Richard Longenecker, professor and New Testament scholar
- Fr. Thomas Looney, C.S.C., president of King's College
- Gerard Mannion, theologian
- Douglas Moggach, philosopher and professor at the University of Ottawa
- Kim Richard Nossal, professor and political scholar
- Rose Patten, businesswoman and 34th Chancellor of the University of Toronto
- A. James Reimer, Mennonite theologian and academic
- Kathryn M. Rudy, Medieval manuscript historian
- Br. Lawrence Spitzig, F.S.C., educator and Director of St. John's Institution, Kuala Lumpur (1954-1960; 1978–1983)
- David Staines, professor and literary critic
- Emőke Szathmáry, anthropologist and president of the University of Manitoba
- Lucian Turcescu, professor and theologian
- Paul C. Weiler, Harvard Law School professor
- Peggy R. Williams, president of Ithaca College
- Gale A. Yee, Biblical scholar
- Philip G. Ziegler, theologian and United Church minister

Arts, literature, and media

- Bert Archer, journalist and author
- Philip Burke, illustrator
- Barry Callaghan, author and poet
- Morley Callaghan, novelist
- Eileen Carron, lawyer and journalist
- Anne Carson, Nobel laureate for Literature (2026), poet author, and literary scholar
- Fr. Charles Coughlin, C.S.B., radio commentator and priest
- Kevin Collins, actor
- Anthony De Sa, novelist and short story writer
- Paul Durcan, poet
- Charles Foran, author and novelist
- Ryan-James Hatanaka, television and film actor
- Hugh Hood, author
- Claire Keegan, short story writer
- Fr. Mark Owen Lee, C.S.B., music scholar and academic
- Bernard MacLaverty, writer and novelist
- Daniel McCarthy, television producer
- Eileen McGann, Celtic musician and songwriter
- Glenn Patterson, writer and professor
- Justin Rutledge, singer and songwriter
- Philip Street, cartoonist and animator
- Katsura Sunshine, Rakugo actor and theatre producer
- Rajiv Surendra, actor and author
- Kevin Sylvester, author, illustrator, and sportscaster
- Sheila Watson, author and literary scholar
- George Weigel, author and political commentator

Athletics

- Marie-Thérèse Armentero, swimmer at the 1984 and 1988 Olympics, bronze medalist at the 1986 World Aquatics Championships
- Bobby Bauer, Hockey Hall of Famer, Olympian, and long time player for the Boston Bruins
- Fr. David Bauer, C.S.B., Roman Catholic priest and founder of the Canada men's national ice hockey team and inductee into the Hockey Hall of Fame
- Fr. Ronald Cullen, inductee into the Canadian Baseball Hall of Fame (1996)
- Dan D'Alvise, professional hockey player and member of Canadian Olympic hockey team (1980)
- Frank Dunlap, lawyer and professional Canadian football player
- Lori Dupuis, professional hockey player and Olympic gold medalist
- Katherine Henderson, CEO of Hockey Canada
- Johnny Metras, inductee into the Canadian Football Hall of Fame
- Mike Pelino, ice hockey coach
- Alan Pyle, member of Canadian Olympic water polo team (1972)
- Bill Regan, professional ice hockey player
- Dorota Urbaniak, rower and Olympic bronze medalist
- Stelio Zupancich, professional hockey player and member of Canadian Olympic hockey team (1980)

Business

- Joseph J. Barnicke, entrepreneur and philanthropist
- Francis Buckley, businessman
- F. Anthony Comper, President and chief executive officer of the Bank of Montreal
- Victor Dodig, President and chief executive officer of the Canadian Imperial Bank of Commerce
- Don Morrison, Chief Operating Officer of BlackBerry

Government and politics

- Stella Ambler, member of Parliament (2011–2015)
- Bob Callahan, member of the Legislative Assembly of Ontario (1985–1995) and Brampton City Council (1969–1985, 1997–2014)
- Edward F. Crawford, member of the New York State Assembly (1957–1973) and New York Supreme Court (1973–1975)
- Bonnie Crombie, Leader of the Ontario Liberal Party (2023-2026), Mayor of Mississauga (2014–2024)
- Consiglio Di Nino, Senator from Ontario (1990–2012)
- Richard A. Dollinger, member of the New York State Senate (1993–2002) and judge on the New York Court of Claims
- Leona Dombrowsky, member of the Legislative Assembly of Ontario (1999–2011)
- James Gervase Foley, civil servant and Clerk of the Crown in Chancery for Canada (1908–1914)
- James Joseph Foy, lawyer and member of the Legislative Assembly of Ontario (1898–1916)
- Eugene Pierce Gillespie, member of the United States House of Representatives (1891–1893)
- Barbara Greene, politician and member of Parliament (1988–1993)
- James Jerome, member of Parliament (1968–1979) and Speaker of the House of Commons (1974–1979)
- David Lametti, Canadian Ambassador to the United Nations (2025-present), member of Parliament (2015–2024), and Minister of Justice and Attorney General of Canada (2019–2023)
- Laurier LaPierre, historian and Senator from Ontario (2001–2004)
- Francesca La Marca, member of the Italian Senate (2022-present)
- Mark MacGuigan, academic, politician, and judicial figure
- Paul Martin Sr., diplomat and member of Parliament (1935–1974)
- Paul Martin, 21st Prime Minister of Canada (2003–2006)
- Todd McCarthy, member of the Legislative Assembly of Ontario (2022–present), Ontario Minister of the Environment, Conservation, and Parks (2025-present)
- Catherine McKenna, member of Parliament (2015–2021), Minister of Environment and Climate Change (2015–2019), and Minister of Infrastructure and Communities (2019–2021)
- Marilou McPhedran, Senator from Manitoba (2016–present)
- Joe Mihevc, Toronto City Councillor (1998–2018)
- David Mulroney, diplomat and national foreign policy advisor, Canadian Ambassador to China (2009–2012).
- Thomas Mulvey, diplomat and Under-Secretary of State for Canada (1909–1933)
- Fabian O'Dea, lawyer and Lieutenant Governor of Newfoundland (1963–1969)
- John Raymond O'Neill, member of Parliament (1925–1926)
- Gordon Osbaldeston, civil servant and government administrator
- Carolyn Parrish, Mayor of Mississauga (2024-present)
- Gérard Pelletier, journalist and member of Parliament (1965–1975)
- Edmond Proulx, lawyer and member of Parliament (1904–1921) and member of the Legislative Assembly of Ontario (1923–1929)
- Ian Scott, lawyer and member of the Legislative Assembly of Ontario (1985–1992)
- Greg Sorbara, member of the Legislative Assembly of Ontario (1985-1995, 2001–2012)
- Elizabeth Joan Smith, politician, Solicitor General of Ontario, and member of the Legislative Assembly of Ontario (1985–1990)
- Filomena Tassi, member of Parliament (2015–present) and Cabinet member
- Jim Wilson, politician and member of the Legislative Assembly of Ontario (1990–2022)

Health, science, and medicine

- Siobhan Brady, biologist
- Peter Joseph Moloney, chemist
- Nancy Olivieri, medical researcher and haematologist
- Mark Siddall, biologist
- Andy Smith, president and CEO of Sunnybrook Health Sciences Centre and professor of surgery at the University of Toronto Faculty of Medicine

Law and judicial figures

- John Casey, judge on the New York Court of Appeals
- Gerald Francis Day, justice of the Ontario Court of Justice (1992–1999) and Ontario Superior Court of Justice (1999–2008)
- Martha M. Devlin, justice of the Supreme Court of British Columbia
- Kathleen O'Connor Diesman, judge on the Judicial Council of California
- Guy P. DiTomaso, judge on the Ontario Superior Court of Justice for Simcoe County, Ontario
- John Joseph Dowlin, judge on the Ontario Superior Court of Justice for Kent County, Ontario (appointed 1904)
- John Edward Eberle, justice of the Ontario Court of Justice (1977–1990) and the Ontario Superior Court of Justice (1990–1994)
- Harry Edmondstone, judge on the Ontario Court of Justice
- John James Fitzpatrick, justice on the Ontario Superior Court of Justice (1982–1989)
- Michael Stanton Fitzpatrick, justice on the Ontario Superior Court of Justice
- Michael Paul Forestall, justice on the Ontario Court of Justice (1990–1999) and Ontario Superior Court of Justice (1999–2004)
- Louis Martin Hays, judge on the regional court of Wellington County, Ontario, and a major in the 57th Regiment of the 2nd/10th Dragoons (1907)
- Bernard William Hurley, justice of the Ontario Court of Justice (1990–1999) and Ontario Superior Court of Justice (1999–2002)
- Joseph James, judge on the Ontario Superior Court of Justice
- William Deneau Lyon, judge on the Ontario Superior Court of Justice (1990–1998)
- Frank Marrocco, Associate Chief Justice of the Ontario Superior Court of Justice (2005–2020)
- Patrick McCurry, judge on the regional court of the Parry Sound District of Ontario (appointed 1898)
- Murray Alexander Mogan, judge on the Tax Court of Canada (appointed 1988)
- J. Patrick Moore, judge on the Ontario Superior Court of Justice (2005–2020)
- Michael Andrew McHugh, judge on the regional court of Essex County, Ontario (appointed 1891)
- Nicholson Duncan McRae, justice of the High Court of Justice (1982–1990), Ontario Court of Justice (1990–1999), and Ontario Superior Court of Justice (1999–2005)
- Hugh Michael O'Connell, justice of the Ontario Court of Justice (1990–1999) and Ontario Superior Court of Justice (1999–2008)
- John Gerald Joseph O'Driscoll, justice of the High Court of Justice (1971–1990), Ontario Court of Justice (1990–1999), and Ontario Superior Court of Justice (1999–2006)
- Dennis O'Leary, justice of the Ontario Superior Court of Justice (1971–2001)
- George Bourke Smith, justice of the Ontario Court of Justice (1990–1999) and Ontario Superior Court of Justice (1999–2008)
- Edward Wren, justice of the Ontario Superior Court of Justice

Religious figures

- Francis Valentine Allen, auxiliary Bishop of Toronto (1954–1977)
- Bryan Bayda, Bishop of the Ukrainian Catholic Eparchy of Toronto and Eastern Canada (2022-present), Bishop of the Ukrainian Catholic Eparchy of Saskatoon (2008–2022)
- John Anthony Boissonneau, auxiliary Bishop of Toronto (2001–present)
- Michael Brehl, C.S.s.R., Bishop of Pembroke (2024-present), Superior General of the Redemptorist Order (2009–2024)
- Thomas Burke, Bishop of Albany (1894–1915)
- Francis Patrick Carroll, Bishop of Calgary (1935–1966)
- Frederick Joseph Colli, Bishop of Thunder Bay (1999–present)
- Joseph Henry Conroy, Bishop of Ogdensburg (1921–1939)
- David Frederick Cunningham, Bishop of Syracuse (1970–1976)
- Celestine Damiano, Apostolic Nuncio to South Africa (1952–1960) and Bishop of Camden (1960–1967)
- Roman Danylak, Bishop and Apostolic Administrator of the Ukrainian Catholic Eparchy of Toronto (1992–2012)
- Nicola De Angelis, Bishop of Peterborough (2002–2014)
- Fr. Wilfrid Dewan, C.S.P., Superior of the Paulist Fathers (1978–1986)
- Thomas Joseph Dowling, Bishop of Peterborough (1886–1889) and Bishop of Hamilton (1889–1924)
- Ralph H. Dignan, Bishop of Sault Sainte Marie (1934-1958)
- Francis P. Duffy, Roman Catholic priest and American military chaplain famously commemorated in Times Square.
- Ronald Peter Fabbro, Bishop of London (2002–present)
- Jacques Fabre-Jeune, Bishop of Charleston (2022–present)
- George Flahiff, Roman Catholic Cardinal and Archbishop of Winnipeg (1961–1982)
- Richard Grecco, Bishop of Charlottetown (2009–2021)
- Jon Hansen, Bishop of Mackenzie-Fort Smith (2017–present)
- Fr. William Richard Harris, Roman Catholic priest, Church historian, Dean of the Roman Catholic Diocese of Saint Catharines
- James Joseph Hartley, Bishop of Columbus (1904-1944)
- Robert Kasun, auxiliary Bishop of Toronto (2016–present)
- Brian Kolodiejchuk, Roman Catholic priest and advocate for the canonization of St Mother Teresa
- Michael Pearse Lacey, auxiliary Bishop of Toronto (1979–1993)
- Fergus McEvay, Archbishop of Toronto (1908–1911)
- Fr. Tom McKillop, Roman Catholic priest and member of the Order of Canada
- J. Michael Miller, Archbishop of Vancouver (2009–2025)
- Fr. Thomas Mooney, Catholic chaplain killed during World War II
- Kenneth Nowakowski, Bishop of the Ukrainian Catholic Eparchy of the Holy Family of London (2020–present)
- Denis O'Connor, first Canadian-born Archbishop of Toronto (1899–1908)
- Richard Alphonsus O'Connor, Bishop of Peterborough (1889-1913)
- John Aloysius O'Mara, Bishop of Thunder Bay (1976-1991), Bishop of St. Catharines (1991-2002)
- Ricardo Ramírez, Bishop of Las Cruces (1982–2013)
- David Joseph Scollard, Bishop of Sault Sainte Marie (1904–1934)
- John Michael Sherlock, Bishop of London (1978–2002)
- Francis John Spence, Archbishop of Kingston (1982–2002)
- Michael Joseph Spratt, Archbishop of Kingston (1911–1938)
- Anthony F. Tonnos, Bishop of Hamilton (1983–2010)
- Benjamin Ibberson Webster, Bishop of Peterborough (1954–1968)
- James Matthew Wingle, Bishop of Yarmouth (1993–2001), Bishop of St. Catharines (2001–2010)

== Sandhill Burial site ==
The university site near Bloor and Bay was a Wendat burial area and resting place of Zeegwon, son of Chief William Yellowhead and an Indigenous fighter who served with the British Army during the War of 1812.
