= Richard Alway =

Canadian Catholic lay leader

President and Vice-Chancellor of the University of St. Michael's College
- In office 1990 – 2008
- Preceded by: James McConica
- Succeeded by: Anne Anderson

Personal details
- Born: Hamilton, Ontario
- Education: University of Toronto
- Occupation: Educator

Academic work
- Institutions: St. Michael's College

Richard Alway, OC OOnt is a Canadian educator and a Catholic layman. He was the first lay President and Vice-Chancellor of the University of St. Michael's College, a federated university in the University of Toronto. He was formerly Praeses (president) of the Pontifical Institute of Mediaeval Studies in Toronto.

Born in Hamilton, Ontario, he graduated from the University of Toronto summa cum laude in 1962. He was a gold medalist in philosophy at St. Michael's College and has two graduate degrees in Modern History from the University of Toronto.

He was a broadcast commentator on Canada's largest radio station, CFRB, for ten years between 1976 and 1986, and acted as publisher of The Catholic Register, Canada's largest Catholic newspaper for two years at the request of Cardinal Emmett Carter, following the sudden death of Father Sean O'Sullivan. Alway was founding Chairman of the Cathedral Council of St. Michael's Cathedral and has taken a leading role in various initiatives to promote further understanding and cooperation between the Roman Catholic and Anglican Churches in Canada. At the request of the Anglican and Roman Catholic Archbishops of Toronto he organized and chaired a symposium on inter-Church relations that was attended by over 300 priests from the two church communities.

As well as being President of the Pontifical Institute of Mediaeval Studies at the University of Toronto, he recently served in the additional capacity of Ministry Supervisor of the Toronto Catholic District School Board (2009–11). He is currently Chairman of the C.D. Howe Memorial Foundation. An active collector of Canadian art he has donated works from his collection to a number of Ontario Galleries. Dr. Alway has served on a number of boards of voluntary associations including the Canadian Educational Standards Institute, and currently is a member of the Board and the executive committee of St. Michael's Hospital in Toronto; Vice-chair of the Board and chair of the executive committee of the Canadian Catholic Bioethics Institute and a member of the Board of the Belmont House Foundation in Toronto.

In 1986 he was appointed by Order in Council as acting director of the National Gallery of Canada on leave from the University of Toronto. He remained in this position during the construction phase of the new gallery building in Ottawa. While at the National Gallery he was also appointed chairman and C.E.O. of the Ontario Heritage Foundation, the province's lead agency for architectural, archaeological, and natural heritage, a post he held for the maximum allowable two three-year terms.

He was a member and the chair of the Historic Sites and Monuments Board of Canada until late 2023, a position in which he has served since 1996.

In the past, he has served on a number of national cultural boards and advisory committees. A member of the Board of Trustees of the National Museums of Canada from 1979 to 1986, he was Chairman of the National Gallery of Canada, of the National Programmes Committee of the National Museums, and at one point Acting Chairman of the National Museum of Natural Sciences, as well as a member of the Board of the National Postal Museum and the Canadian Opera Company.

In 1989, he was made a Member of the Order of Canada and was promoted to Officer in 1998. He was awarded the Order of Ontario in 2001. He was appointed Knight of Magistral Grace of the Sovereign Military Order of Malta, Knight of the Order of the Holy Sepulchre, and Knight Grand Cross with Star of the Order of St. Gregory the Great by Pope John Paul II, the highest Church recognition for a layman. He is the first person from Toronto to receive this order. He holds an honorary Doctor of Laws degree from the University of Toronto and is an honorary fellow of Trinity College, Toronto.
