= John P. Dourley =

The Reverend John P. Dourley OMI
- Born: John Patrick Dourley; 1936; Venosta, Ontario, Canada
- Died: June 22, 2018 (aged 81–82); Ottawa, Ontario, Canada
- Resting place: St. Theresa’s Cemetery; Arnprior, Ontario, Canada
- Occupations: Priest, professor, Jungian analyst
- Known for: Jungian theology and psychology; comparative studies of religion and psyche
- Title: Professor Emeritus of Religious Studies

Academic background
- Education: Licentiate in Philosophy and Theology (St. Paul University, Ottawa); M.Th. (University of Ottawa); M.A. (St. Michael’s College); Ph.D. (Fordham University)
- Thesis: The Psyche As Sacrament: A Comparative Study of C.G. Jung and Paul Tillich (1971)
- Influences: Carl Jung; Paul Tillich

Academic work
- Discipline: Religious studies
- Sub-discipline: Jungian psychology and theology
- School or tradition: Jungian psychology; theology
- Institutions: Carleton University
- Main interests: Religion and psychology; Jungian interpretation of religion
- Notable works: Paul Tillich and Bonaventure (1975); Psyche as Sacrament (1981); Paul Tillich, Carl Jung and the Recovery of Religion (2008); Jung and his Mystics (2014)
- Notable ideas: Jungian theological interpretation of psyche and religion

Religious life
- Religion: Roman Catholic
- Order: Oblates of Mary Immaculate
- Profession: Priest; Jungian analyst
- Ordination: June 1964

John P. Dourley OMI (1936–22 June 2018) was a Jungian analyst, a professor of religious studies, and a Catholic priest. He taught for many years at Carleton University in Ottawa, his doctorate being from Fordham University. He received his Diploma in Analytical Psychology from the C. G. Jung Institute in Zūrich/Kusnacht.

He is best known as a 'Jungian theologian' for his considerate interpretation of, and critical insights into, the psychology of Carl Jung. Often in context with contemporary religious thinking, e.g., the Protestant Paul Tillich, Dourley made inquires into the wider implications of Jung's views, which situates the source of religion in the psyche.

== Education ==
Dourley came of age in Ottawa. In 1964 he was ordained a Catholic priest in the Oblates of Mary Immaculate. He then received his Licentiate in Philosophy and Theology at St. Paul University in Ottawa, his Masters in Theology at the University of Ottawa, and a M.A. at St. Michael's College, Toronto. In 1971 he was awarded his Ph.D. in Theology, at Fordham in New York City.

While at St. Michael's College, Dourley apparently studied with Gregory Baum, a participant in interfaith dialogue. At Fordham, Dourley's mentor Ewert Cousins advised him to read Carl Jung. At Union Seminary, Tom Driver introduced Dourley to the writings of Paul Tillich. Fr. Mooney introduced him to Teilhard de Chardin's.

== As professor ==
From New York he returned to Ottawa, where he served as a professor at Carleton University, first at St. Patrick's College (1970–1979), then in the Religious Studies Department. He retired from teaching at Carleton in 2001. Dourley had given the Marston LaFrance Fellowship Lecture at Carleton University in 1989.

His first book was published in 1975. It derived from his Ph.D. dissertation at Fordham on two theologians: the modern Lutheran Paul Tillich (1886–1965), and Bonaventure (1221–1274) of the medieval monastic tradition stemming from Augustine and Francis.

== Work per Jung ==
Early during his studies Dourley became aware of Jungian psychology. In 1980 at Zūrich/Kusnacht he was certified as a therapist, receiving the Diploma given to Jungian analysts. In Ottawa he then started private practice as a clinical therapist. "John... was one of the founding analysts of the first Canadian training program... of the Ontario Association of Jungian Analysts (OAJA). His analysands spoke of his compassion, wisdom, and presence."

Dourley's second book was published in 1981 by Inner City, a Toronto publishing company "founded in 1980 to promote the understanding and practical application of the work of C. G. Jung". It accepted Dourley's manuscript for its seventh title. As in his first book, Dourley wrote about the theology of Paul Tillich, here comparing it with the psychology of Carl Jung (1875–1961). Four of Dourley's books were published by Inner City, following his first at Brill Academic. Three books were issued by Edwin Mellen. His last three were at Routledge.

The books were attractive to many and challenging to others, radical as they were in the face of patriarchy and conventional theology. Like Jung, John felt compelled to write, to communicate his understanding of Jung’s message to the world. I’m bitten by this, he said, and I have to keep on writing. He was writing to the day he died.

Dourley taught Jungian subjects at various forums. At gatherings of the International Association for Analytical Psychology during the plenary sessions he gave lectures, e.g., at Barcelona 2004, Cape Town 2007, Montreal 2010, and Copenhagen 2013. At the University of Cambridge and at Yale University, he aired his interpretive views of Jung. In 2012 he presented a paper at the 2nd European Conference on Analytical Psychology in Russia, at St. Petersburg.

According to Daryl Sharp, his Toronto editor, "John was a very human priest, not at all 'holier than thou'. He was witty; he was kind and generous." When asked about how he had avoided censure from the Vatican, Dourley said he was “too far under the radar.” Sharp also commented:

"Although [Dourley] was sometimes uncomfortable in the bosom of the Catholic Church, he was able to reconcile his priestly calling with Jung’s tenets, and he wrote eloquently of them both. ... [H]e never abandoned either his early Jesuitical training or his midlife love of Jung, though to his skeptical peers they might appear to be irreconcilable opposites. This dissonance he explored... ."

Dourley traveled the complicated borderlands between religion and psychology. He drew out and further articulated many of the philosophic and spiritual implications inherent in Jung's work. Mystical views that informed it were often central to the discussions.

== Psyche as Sacrament ==
The theology of Paul Tillich and the psychology of Carl Jung are here sketched and compared. Tillich often used a philosophical language of "ultimate concern" and employed an ontology that related human experience to the nature of divine Being. Jung described interior archetypes that are only indirectly apprehended, yet which constitute a hidden influence on the conscious ego (p. 30). In each of their appraisals of human experience, Dourley found a somewhat similar point of view.

Both Tillich and Jung affirmed as a key insight that the phenomenal source of religious experience exists within the individual. Tillich sometimes called this source the "ground of being" (pp. 19–20). For Jung it was the collective unconscious, variously qualified. Located in an autonomous realm of the psyche, this source exists independently of the conscious ego, outside its control or manipulation. Yet from this source springs dynamic configurations, numinous symbols that come forth into human awareness (31–32). Such may overawe the individual, i.e., anyone.

The birth of a powerful symbol, and the longevity of its potency, depends on its concurrent acceptance by the human community and each individual. The symbol lives in society's faith, and/or within culture. A numinous symbol may directly work on the ego, or indirectly, unconsciously. As the psyche of each individual constitutes the medium by which humanity may meet this divine manifestation, Dourley interprets the psyche as a living sacrament.

== Bibliography ==
=== Books ===
- Paul Tillich and Bonaventure: An evaluation of Tillich's claim to stand in the Augustinian-Franciscan tradition (Leiden: Brill Academic 1975), 213 pages.
- Psyche as Sacrament: A comparative study of C.G. Jung and Paul Tillich (Toronto: Inner City 1981), 128 pages. ISBN 0-919123-06-6.
- The Illness that We are: A Jungian critique of Christianity (Toronto: Inner City 1984), 128 pages.
- Love, Celibacy and the Inner Marriage (Toronto: Inner City 1987), 128 pages. ISBN 0-919123-28-7.
- The Goddess, Mother of the Trinity. A Jungian implication (Lewiston: Edwin Mellen 1990), 112 pages.
- A Strategy for a Loss of Faith. Jung's proposal (Toronto: Inner City 1992), 144 pages. ISBN 0-919123-57-0.
- Jung and the Religious Alternative. The rerooting (Lewiston: Edwin Mellen 1995), 329 pages.
- The Intellectual Autobiography of a Jungian theologian (Lewiston: Edwin Mellen 2006), 122 pages.
- Paul Tillich, Carl Jung and the Recovery of Religion (Hove: Routledge 2008), 208 pages
- On behalf of the Mystical Fool: Jung on the religious situation (Hove: Routledge 2010), 272 pages.
- Jung and his Mystics. In the end it all comes to nothing (Hove: Routledge 2014), 213 pages.

=== Selected articles ===
- "Jung, Tillich, and aspects of western Christian development" in Thought: Fordham University Quarterly (1977), v. 5/2, pp. 18–49.
- "Jung and metaphysics: A dubious distinction" in Pastoral Sciences (Ottawa: St. Paul University 1993), v. 12, pp. 15–24.
- "The religious implications of Jung's psychology" in The Journal of Analytical Psychology (Routledge 1995), v. 40/2, pp. 177–204.
- "Jacob Boehme and Paul Tillich on Trinity and God: Similarities and differences" in Religious Studies (Dec. 1995), v. 31/4, pp. 429–445.
- "Issues of naturalism and supernaturalism in Tillich's correlation of religious with psychological healing" in Studies in Religion/Sciences Religeuses (1997), v. 26/2.
- "Bringing up Father: C. G. Jung on history as the education of God" in The European Legacy (1999), v. 4/2, pp. 54–68.
- "Archetypal Hatred as Social Bond: Strategies for its dissolution" in John Beebe, editor, Terror, Violence and the Impulse to Destroy: Perspectives from Analytical Psychology (Einseideln: Daimon Verlag 2003), pp. 135–160.
- "Jung, Mysticism and the double Quaternity: Jung and the psychic origin of religious and mystical experience" in Harvest (2004), v. 50/1, pp. 47–74.
- "Rerooting in the Mother. The numinosity of the night" in Ann Casement and David Tacey, editors, The Idea of the Numinous. Contemporary Jungian and psychoanalytic perspectives (Hove: Routledge 2006), pp. 171–185.
- "Jung's equation of the ground of being with the ground of the psyche" in The Journal of Analytical Psychology (Routledge 2011), v. 56/4, pp. 514–531.
