= Gerard Mannion =

Irish Catholic theologian (1970–2019)

- Born: 1970 (age 55–56); Northampton
- Died: 21 September 2019 (aged 48); Washington D.C.
- Citizenship: British/Irish
- Occupation: theologian

Academic background
- Education: King's College, Cambridge; New College, Oxford
- Thesis: The humble path to ethics : Schopenhauer, religion and morality (1999)

Academic work
- Discipline: Theology
- Sub-discipline: Ethics
- Institutions: Oxford University; Leeds Trinity University; Liverpool Hope University; KU Leuven; Georgetown University

Gerard Mannion (25 September 1970 – 21 September 2019) was an Irish theologian. He published extensively in the fields of ecclesiology, ethics, and public theology, as well as on other subjects in the area of systematic theology and philosophy.

== Biography ==
Gerard Michael J. Mannion was born in Northampton, England, in 1970. He was of Irish descent and held dual citizenship. He received his B.A. from King's College, Cambridge, followed by a Master of Studies (M.St.) and a D.Phil. from New College, Oxford.

He held academic posts at Oxford, Trinity & All Saints College, Liverpool Hope University, and Leuven (Belgium). He was also Professor of Theology and Director of the Center for Catholic Thought and Culture at the University of San Diego. In January 2014, Mannion moved to Georgetown University, became Joseph and Winifred Amaturo Chair in Catholic Studies at the Department of Theology and Religious Studies, and he was a senior research fellow at the Berkley Center, focusing on the church's role in the world, social ethics, and ecumenical and inter-religious dialogue. He had been visiting professor at the University of Tübingen, the Dominican Institute of Theology, St. Michael's College, University of Toronto, and Chichester University.

He was made an honorary fellow of the Australian Catholic University, senior research fellow in public theology at the "Centro per le Scienze Religiose of the Fondazione Bruno Kessler," a 2004 Coolidge Fellow at Union Theological Seminary / Columbia University, and was chosen to take part in the "Teaching the Ethical, Legal and Social Implications of the Human Genome Project" project at Dartmouth College’s Ethics Institute. He was the founding chair of the "Ecclesiological Investigations International Research Network" and President of the "International Network of Societies for Catholic Theology" (2017-2020) of the Catholic Theological Society of America. He was the editor of Bloomsbury Publishing's series "Ecclesiological Investigations" and series co-editor, with Oxford University’s Mark Chapman, of Palgrave Macmillan’s "Pathways for Ecumenical and Inter-religious Dialogue" series. He completed six years as founding co-chair of the Ecclesiology Program Unit of the American Academy of Religion (the world's largest scholarly organisation in the field) and sat on the steering groups of both the AAR's Ecclesiology and Vatican II Studies Program Units. He was admitted to the American Theological Society in 2014 and also sat on the editorial committees of Ecclesiology and Ecclesial Practices: the Journal of Ecclesiology, Ethnography and Congregational Studies.

Mannion died unexpectedly on 21 September 2019.

== Controversies ==
He was critical of Catholic academia (and also criticised) over the reception and accommodation of speakers and scholars who dissent from the official teachings of the Roman Catholic Church. He also took a critical stance in the media against comparisons of the Vatican City's walls with the proposed US Border wall and was critical of the concept of infallibility.

== Selected bibliography ==
- Pope Francis and the Future of Catholicism: Evangelii Gaudium and the Papal Agenda (2017)
- Where We Dwell in Common: Pathways for Dialogue in the 21st Century (ed., 2015)
- The Routledge Companion to the Christian Church (2008, ed. with Lewis Mudge)
- Catholic Social Justice: Theological and Practical Explorations (2007, co-edited with Philomena Cullen and Bernard Hoose)
- Ecclesiology and Postmodernity: Questions for the Church in Our Times (2007)
- Schopenhauer, Religion and Modernity (2003)
