= Henry Carr (priest) =

Canadian Catholic Basilian priest and education pioneer (1880–1963

The Reverend Henry Carr C.S.B.
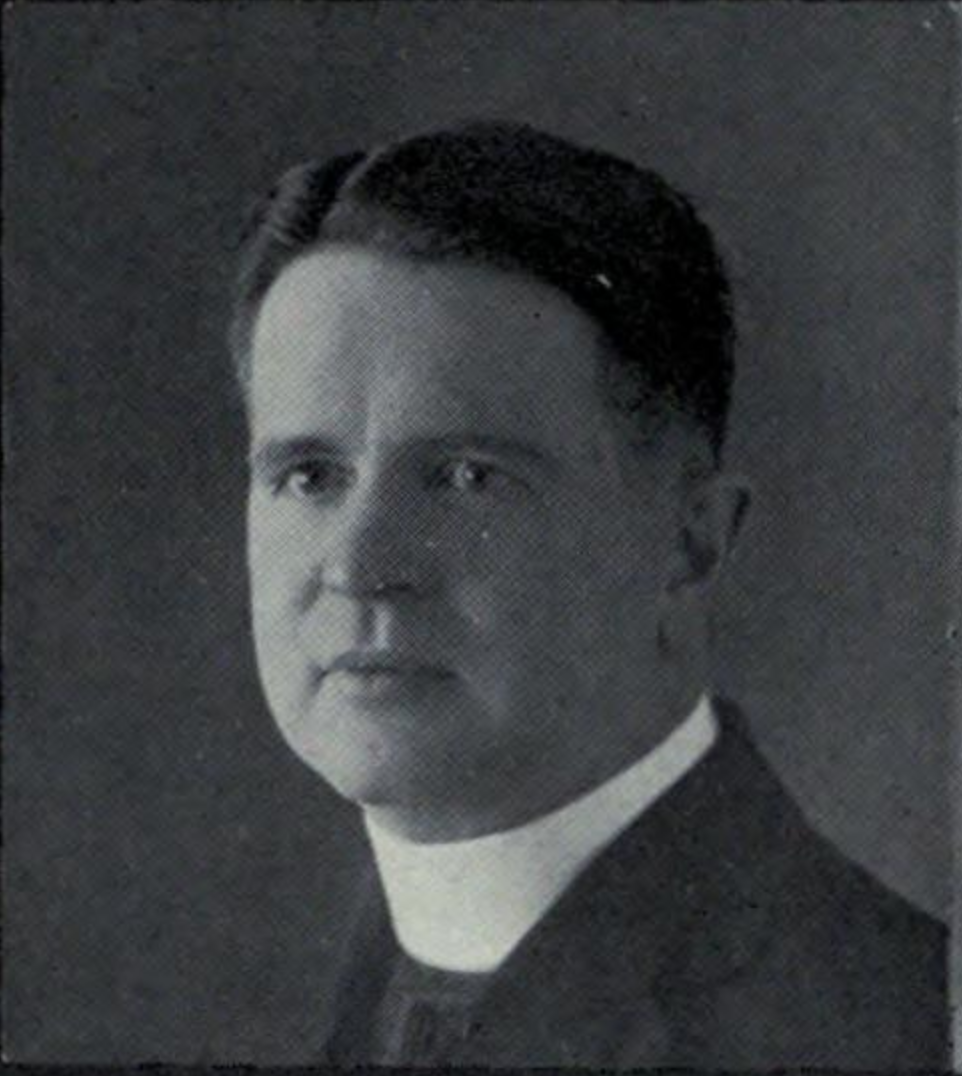
- Church: Catholic Church
- Previous posts: President, Institute of Mediaeval Studies (1929–1936); Superior General, Congregation of St. Basil (1930–1942); Superior and Principal, St. Thomas More College (1942–1949); Superior and Principal, St. Mark's College (1956–1961)

Orders
- Ordination: 3 September 1905

Personal details
- Born: 8 January 1880 Oshawa, Ontario, Canada
- Died: 28 November 1963 (aged 83) Vancouver, British Columbia
- Occupation: Catholic priest; educator; administrator
- Education: University of Toronto (St. Michael's College)

Henry Carr (8 January 1880 – 28 November 1963) was a Canadian Basilian priest also known as Father "Hank" Carr. He enhanced Catholic education in Canada by broadening the curriculum at University of Toronto's University of St. Michael's College. He also arranged for St. Michael's to be a federated arts college. He was the co-founder of the Pontifical Institute of Medieval Studies, and an advocate for the inclusion of religious education in curricular studies.

Carr was born and raised in Oshawa, Ontario in 1880, one of nine children. He was ordained as a priest on 3 September 1905. He taught at St. Michael's College and acted as a president of the Institute of Mediaeval Studies until 1936 and served as the principal at St. Thomas More College in Saskatchewan. He died of pneumonia on 28 November 1963 in Vancouver, British Columbia.

Carr was recognized as a Canadian Person of National Historic Significance in 2012.

Father Henry Carr Catholic Secondary School and Carr Hall at the University of St. Michael's College are named after him.
