= David Sylvester (medievalist) =

Canadian medievalist and university administrator

President and Vice-Chancellor of the University of St. Michael's College
- Incumbent
- Assumed office August 1, 2018
- Preceded by: David Mulroney

Principal of King's University College
- In office 2009 – March 2018

1st President of Corpus Christi College
- In office 1999 – 2009

Personal details
- Born: Trail, British Columbia, Canada

Academic background
- Education: St. Thomas More Collegiate; St. Francis Xavier University; Niagara University
- Thesis: Maritime communities in pre-plague England: Winchelsea and the Cinque Ports

Academic work
- Discipline: Medieval history

David Sylvester is President and Vice-Chancellor of the University of St. Michael's College in the University of Toronto, Canada.

== Biography ==
Born in Trail, British Columbia, he attended St. Thomas More Collegiate in Burnaby. He attended St. Francis Xavier University in Antigonish, Nova Scotia, where he also played football. He finished his undergraduate degree at Niagara University in New York, before receiving his master's and Ph.D. in medieval studies from the Jesuit-led Fordham University in New York City. His Ph.D. thesis was entitled, "Maritime communities in pre-plague England: Winchelsea and the Cinque Ports". While at Fordham, Sylvester met his future wife, Allyson Larkin, who was in the same program. Sylvester became the first President of Corpus Christi College and in 2005 was named the Principal of St. Mark's College, also at the University of British Columbia. He was hired to serve as the principal of King's University College in 2009. At the time of his hiring he also served as the vice-chair of the Association of Catholic Colleges and Universities of Canada.

Sylvester was appointed president of University of St. Michael's College University of Toronto and Vice-Chancellor of University of Toronto, effective August 1, 2018.
