= Leslie Dewart =

Canadian philosopher and Professor Emeritus

- Born: 22 December 1922; Madrid, Spain
- Died: 20 December 2009 (aged 86); Toronto, Ontario, Canada

Education
- Education: University of Toronto

Philosophical work
- Era: 20th-century philosophy (modern philosophy)
- Region: Western philosophy
- School: Theological philosophy
- Main interests: Cuban Revolution, Religion, Language, Consciousness

Leslie Dewart (December 18, 1922 – December 20, 2009) was a Canadian philosopher and Professor Emeritus at the Graduate Department of Philosophy and the Centre for the Study of Religion at the University of Toronto.

Dewart was born in Madrid, Spain, in 1922, but he was raised by his mother in Cuba. Coming to Canada at the age of 19, he served in the Royal Canadian Air Force in bomber-reconnaissance operations on the Atlantic Coast from 1942 to 1947, subsequently becoming a Canadian citizen. He then began his studies at the University of Toronto.

He was a Roman Catholic.

== Academic career ==
Dewart's academic interests were wide-ranging, and evolved considerably over the course of his career. He first graduated with a BA in Honours Psychology in 1951. He then enrolled in the Graduate Department of Philosophy, receiving his MA in 1952 and his PhD quickly thereafter in 1954. He began his teaching career in Philosophy at the University of Detroit in 1954, then returned to Toronto to teach at St. Michael's College in its then independent Department of Philosophy from 1956 to 1968.

He was appointed to the Department of Philosophy, School of Graduate Studies in 1961. His interests in theory of knowledge and religion then led him to join the Department of Religious Studies, St. Michael's College in 1968 to 1975, and he served in the Institute of Christian Thought there from 1969 to 1979, and the Faculty of Theology from 1968 to 1988.

Late in 1969 an investigation by the Vatican's Congregation for the Doctrine of the Faith was convened to examine the theological opinions in Dewart's writings, particularly The Future of Belief. However, no condemnatory action was taken by the authorities.

Among his other appointments in the field were: Chair of the University of Toronto Combined Departments of Religious Studies (1970 to 1971), Professor in the later University of Toronto Department of Religious Studies (1975 to 1988) and the Graduate Centre for Religious Studies (1976 to 1988 – the year of his retirement). During this time, Professor Dewart strongly argued for the continuation of a place for Theology in these University divisions.

During his time in Philosophy and Religious Studies, Dewart served in editorial or advisory capacities for journals such as Continuum, Internationale Dialog Zeitschrift, Concurrence, Studies in Religion – Sciences réligieuses and Journal of Ultimate Reality and Meaning.

In the late 1970s Dewart turned his attention to the study of law, receiving the LLB from the Faculty of Law, University of Toronto in 1979, and was called to the Ontario Bar in 1981.

== Dewart's personal plan ==
Dewart's obituary [Globe and Mail, 2 Jan., 2010] begins, "His plan completed.…" These terse words beg examination of his "plan" which he had outlined as an afterword in his last book published posthumously, Hume's Challenge and the Renewal of Modern Philosophy. In the epilogue (cf. David Hume). "The Future of Philosophy," he judged that his attempts at understanding the failure of modern philosophy may or may not have succeeded. "It is not out of the question that in the future there should be other attempts, besides mine, to understand the historical causes of the failure of modern philosophy, and to attempt to remedy them. And if such attempts reach the correct conclusions that have escaped me, they should yield more adequate proposals than mine." In its intent, Dewart's purpose was not unlike like that of Edmund Husserl. Quentin Lauer notes that Husserl, "conceived it as his task to establish the method whereby phenomenological analyses and essential intuitions would be made possible, thus devoting his whole life to the development of a phenomenological program rather than to the actual carrying out of the phenomenological analyses, which he hoped would be accomplished, generation after generation, by a whole community of scholars devoting itself to the sort of method he tried to perfect during his lifetime." Dewart realized that his generation had not seen philosophy overcome the mistakes that brought it down. And returning, in this secular age, to theology or a religious faith to overcome these mistakes was not an option in Dewart's plan for the future of philosophy. Science's brief ascendancy and profitable contribution to civilized society, which is currently waning, had not taught modern society how to wield power without doing harm to itself and the world. Philosophy needs a sound understanding of human nature to do that. However, his plan for philosophy amounted to minority viewpoint within a minority viewpoint. Regarding this minority community of philosophers, whom he referenced in his books, he wrote: "I have referred to a few of the few others who are like-minded," acknowledging, however, that their reasons for their discontent differed from his. He accepted that his recommendations for future philosophical improvement may ultimately prove useless. But, he acknowledged at the same time that reason may eventually prevail.

== Dewart's philosophical perspective ==
=== Commentary ===
Dewart's philosophical perspective begins with his PhD Thesis (University of Toronto, 1954), entitled Development of Karl Pearson’s Scientific Philosophy .

While Dewart was not a theologian, his philosophy lays a new foundation for contemporary Catholic theology that does not rely on the traditional epistemological foundation of Hellenic philosophy. His philosophical insights are a conscious, reflective “transposition to another key” of the experience of the Christian faith as his PhD shows.

Who was Karl Pearson? Karl Pearson (1857 – 1936) was a British statistician and interpreter of the philosophy and social role of science. He was brought up in the Church of England but although as an adult adhered to the “freethought” movement yet he always identified with his Quaker ancestry. In 1875 Pearson won a scholarship to enter the University of Cambridge. During his college years he lost his religious faith and subsequently studied German philosophy and literature. In the Abstract to his thesis Dewart wrote: “Since his undergraduate days Pearson was keenly interested in religion, and he seems to have been especially affected by the opposition of science and religion current in the thought of his time. Pearson held that science had effectively shown that revealed religion could not rightly claim to possess truth. But he also held that man has certain religious needs which science as such can neither deny nor satisfy. Hence, his problem was to find a "creed of life," a set of basic truths and moral axioms which would harmonize religious feeling and reason.”

Dewart shows that Pearson initially believed that knowledge is identical to virtue and religion, but came to believe that science is the only reliable knowledge base for religious and moral thought. That is, deliverance from sin and the salvation for mankind lie in scientific knowledge. Pearson sought to show that science must somehow transcend the dichotomy of matter and mind; subject and object through the identification of phenomena (that is, being) and reality. In his attempt he sought a “creed of life” for personal guidance and peace of mind, according to Dewart. Therefore, from a philosophical perspective in his thesis, Dewart details the development of Pearson's quest for a “creed of life” in the context of Pearson's time. This, Dewart advised, will help one understand the man, before his name disappears from philosophical memory, given that he was not a professional theologian.

Pearson lived during the time of the great debate between science and religion, when evolution appeared to conclusively refute the traditional religious doctrines. Pearson, not being from an overly-devout background, but from a “stock of Dissenters” thought that it was impossible to hold simultaneously to the theory of evolution and the traditional Christian faith. How to harmonize and integrate religion and science was the problem. Part of the problem, Dewart emphasizes, is the incorrect grasp of the meaning of science which must understand itself before it can be reconciled with religion. Religion, likewise, has forgotten its true nature and, setting itself against religion, has lost the contest and fell into disrepute. For Pearson, this contest remains a matter of humanity's relationship to God which will occupy him all during his life.

According to Dewart's assessment of Pearson's scientific philosophy, Christianity has neglected humanity's welfare for the sake of its own theology by relying too heavily on the Greek philosophy it had inherited. Therefore, science must enlighten philosophy and attempt to account for the universe without the use of religious concepts. Pearson sought to give future humanity a religion worthy of its intellect, and science was to be the vehicle to achieve this. Ultimately, for Pearson, his philosophy of statistical induction became his answer to what was essentially a religious problem in Dewart's estimation. (Throughout his career Dewart will attempt his own philosophical answer to what he viewed as essentially a religious problem, including his posthumously published, Hume’s Challenge and the Renewal of Modern Philosophy.)

What is significant in Pearson's thought is the unity of method in all science, not its content. The method of science leads to knowledge. Thus, scientific philosophy does not lead to poetry, metaphysics, mythology, or fantasy. The practicality of science implies a certain usefulness to theology, Dewart maintains. After investigating the development of Pearson's scientific philosophy, Dewart concludes that science affords a possible description of the future, but not an explanation of what the future will be.

Three particular convictions that form a core for all Dewart's books arose from his investigation of Pearson's scientific philosophy. They are: 1) The order of the world is not fashioned by the nature of the mind. Causes are at play other than the mind. 2) The regularity of events implies law. Critical reflection suggests otherwise. 3) The essence of being is “to appear” to one's consciousness via the senses.

=== Dehellenization ===
Western philosophy is no longer restricted to the ideas of a classical world, but may be consciously undertaken within the personal world of experience that is beginning to "dehellenize" itself. Although written as a text on political philosophy, this philosophical lesson was learned from the Cuban revolutionary experience (cf. his first book). Although not widely recognized at the time, the revolutionary experience was, in fact, a process of "dehellenization," as Dewart understands the process throughout in his writings. Thinkers will conceive of God, in a dehellenized future of thought, as an existential reality, Dewart maintains.

Western philosophy, "come of age," does not experience the world as hostile, as did the Hellenists, but rather, as stimulating and challenging and Western philosophy must dehellenize its interpretation of experience accordingly. This dehellenization requires the abandonment of scholasticism, with the subsequent development of a conscious re-conceptualization of experience. Dewart identifies the development of human conscious re-conceptualization as dehellenization, which is a positive term. It is not "un-hellenization," since dehellenization evolves out of Hellenization. Dehellenization is but the current stage within Western philosophy's evolution, and it may not be the last.

The religious perspective motivates Dewart's thinking, to varying degrees throughout all his works, and it is by his own words that his notion of dehellenization is expressed most succinctly.

I am disinclined to believe in the hidden power of the immanent divinities which, as Thales thought, all things are full of. Belief in the Christian God implies, so far as I am concerned, a positive disbelief in Fate: necessity be damned, for all I care. I refuse -- let me make the religious nature of this act of un-faith clear, I refuse -- until, if ever, I should be shown otherwise, to believe the primitive superstitions that there are implicit necessities within being, that being has, as its very reality, an inner warrant to command assent, and that invisible predeterminations constitute it and make it definable as that which has an antecedent call on the intellect

=== Conscious communication and computers ===
Indeed, some people who have first hand acquaintance with speech are nevertheless so confused about what they do when they speak - and therefore when they think - that they even wonder whether computers do not think.

An eminent computer scientist once thus proposed - he was serious, and convinced many of his colleagues - that unless one could tell the difference between teleprinter exchanges between oneself and a computer, and like exchanges between oneself and another human being, one should admit that there is no essential difference between the human's and the machine's 'thinking' processes.

However, not a few philosophical arguments to the contrary have been comparably wide of the mark, such as those based on absence of emotion, moral sensibility, and so on, in computers. Strangely, those who raise these objections rarely point out what would be more relevant: that computers are not even alive. Objections based on the supposed differences between what the computer and what human beings can do are beside the point - which is that the computer does not perform at all any of the vital activities that the absent-minded project onto them.

This shows, however, the same absent-minded muddle that would be revealed by someone who wondered whether telephones did not speak and think (for, tinny voice aside, they are apt to give very thoughtful replies), or who reasoned that books think (since they contain and communicate thoughts). The user is not in communication with the computer, any more than the reader communicates with the book or the caller with the telephone - even when he is greeted by an answering machine. Quite as the reader. of the book communicates with the author and with himself, the user of a computer is in communication, first, with himself, using the machine to think more efficiently than otherwise, and, second, with the programmer who wrote the application, whose thinking is embodied in the program. A user may well be unable to determine whether he is in communication with other human beings through a computer or else directly. But this should be no more astonishing than the inability to determine, in like circumstances, whether one is receiving a telephone message viva voce or only a prerecorded one. Even with unlimited exchanges, the mediation of a computer could be detected only by a user who was more skilled at detecting the programmed nature of the responses than the programmer - not the computer - was at hiding it. As an abacus and a slide rule are tools wherewith the user can perform complex mathematical operations more efficiently than without, though the instruments themselves cannot so much as add one plus one, a computer is a machine for thinking, not a machine that thinks.

Evidently, those who fail to perceive the difference disregard the distinction between the activity of thinking and the contents of thought. The latter can be objectified and embodied by the thinker - through his manipulation of, say, ink and paper, sliding beads, or electric currents and magnetic fields - in visual or other signs that he (and other human beings) can understand. Only such disregard would permit their ignoring the fact that being alive and being capable of experiencing are among the indispensable prerequisites of thinking. Nor do they seem to realize that even true communication with another would not be, of itself, proof that the communicator thinks; the latter would require evidence that the communicator communicates to himself what he also communicates to his communicant.

(Cf. Evolution and Consciousness, pp. 106–07.)

[In the short run the invention of the computer, and in particular of computers having what is misleadingly called ‘artificial intelligence,’ can be an asset.] This may be deemed a close parallel of the invention of phonetic writing not least of all because it may prove to be the cause of cultural changes comparable in magnitude only to the Sumerian innovation. It is already possible - though with limitations that are certain to be overcome before long - to build computers that (to put it loosely) understand spoken instructions and reply in kind, that can translate from one human language to another, that exercise judgment 'on the basis of previous experience (for instance, they offer medical diagnoses and prescribe medical procedures), and that seem to think and reason in ways that are distinguishable from the human processes only in being more reliable and exceedingly faster. Of course, a computer that takes verbal instructions and responds with intelligible vocal sounds - either in the same or in another language - discoursing on, say, medical subjects, no more understands speech or medicine than a typewriter thil1ks and then communicates its medical wisdom by typing out a medical textbook. It is the human beings who use it, and who interact by means of it, that alone perform these activities; the computer could be attributed 'artificial intelligence' only in the same metaphorical sense in which levers might be ascribed 'artificial muscle power.' Thus, using a computer that has been appropriately programmed to lend him tile skills of human medical experts, a person can produce results that surpass what he could do on his own - the very thing that a medical textbook can help him do, though on a much smaller scale.

But many people are unclear about the difference between the activity and the contents of thought; they therefore assume that 'artificial intelligence' is possible, and are inspired to create it. My point is that their not knowing better facilitates their success. For instance, they analyse human speech and thought in order to recreate these processes electronically in computers. Now, if they took into account the assertiveness of speech and thought, they would realize that the threshold requirement for producing these is some sort of self-oriented causal process - in other words, the purposiveness that is found only in living entities - and would therefore deem impossible the creation of a machine with artificial intelligence. Their unawareness of this impossibility, however, holds a paradoxical advantage: speech and thought as they mistakenly conceive them are the kind that can be electronically reproduced. In the end they do not, to be sure, create a true counterpart of the human processes; but what they actually achieve is a marvel nonetheless, and multiplies immeasurably the power of human beings to bring about change. Now, why should 'artificial intelligence' be created? And for what ends should it be used once it is created? These questions are not likely to be adequately answered either by scientists who are so confused about themselves that they conceive the idea of creating it, nor by the equally perplexed, eager consumers of scientific technology who defer to them.

(Cf. Evolution and Consciousness, pp. 307–08.)

== Books ==
Dewart published five books during his career:

- Christianity and Revolution, (New York: Herder & Herder, 1963) an analysis of the Cuban revolution.
- The Future of Belief, (New York: Herder & Herder, 1966) translated into six languages, which challenged the classical metaphysical conception of God, and received wide press.
- The Foundations of Belief, (New York: Herder & Herder, 1969)
- Religion, Language and Truth, (New York: Herder & Herder, 1970)
- Evolution and Consciousness: The Role of Speech in the Origin and Development of Human Nature, (Toronto: University of Toronto Press, 1989)
- Hume's Challenge and the Renewal of Modern Philosophy, (Published posthumously, 2016)

== Sources ==
- Faculty of Arts and Science, University of Toronto
- The Thomas Merton Center at Bellarmine University
