= James Kelsey McConica =

Canadian priest and academic (1930–2023)

President and Vice-Chancellor of the University of St. Michael's College
- In office 1984 – 1990
- Preceded by: Peter Swan
- Succeeded by: Richard Alway

Personal details
- Born: April 24, 1930
- Died: December 20, 2023 (aged 93)

James Kelsey McConica OC FBA FRHistS FRSC CSB (April 24, 1930 – December 20, 2023) was a Canadian Roman Catholic priest, academic, and academic administrator.

In 1964, McConica co-founded, along with Natalie Zemon Davis, the Toronto Renaissance and Reformation Colloquium. He was president and vice-chancellor of the University of St. Michael's College in Toronto, Ontario, from 1984 to 1990. He was also president of the Pontifical Institute of Mediaeval Studies from 1996 to 2008. He was also a fellow of All Souls College, Oxford, the first Roman Catholic priest to be a fellow since the English Reformation.

One of the original members of the Collected Works of Erasmus (CWE) in English project of the University of Toronto Press, McConica edited a number of volumes in the series. From 1976 to 2018, he chaired the CWE editorial board. McConica is the author of Erasmus in the Past Masters Series). Other selected publications by McConica are listed at the All Souls College website.

McConica died on December 20, 2023, at the age of 93.

== Sources ==
- Officer of the Order of Canada
- All Souls College, University of Oxford
- Webb, Margaret (2006). "The Constant Gardener". The Third Degree. 18 (1): 14–18. hdl:10294/3068.
- Crane, Mark (Fall 2014). "Forty Years of the Collected Works of Erasmus"
- Cohen, Elizabeth S. and Couchman, Jane (Summer 2014). "The Toronto Renaissance and Reformation Colloquium: An Independent Intellectual Forum at Fifty Years"
