= Affiliated school =

Type of educational institution

An affiliated school (also affiliated college, federated school, federated college or federated university) is an educational institution that operates independently, but also has a formal collaborative agreement with another, usually larger institution that may have some level of control or influence over its academic policies, standards or programs.

While a university may have one or several affiliated colleges, it is not necessarily a collegiate university, which is a union or federation of semi-autonomous colleges. For the most part, this model is restricted to colleges and universities. On rarer occasions, however, elementary schools or high schools may also enter into affiliating agreements.

== Examples of affiliated schools by area ==
=== Canada ===
In Canada several universities have federated or affiliated colleges, some of which predate the parent institution. A full list of affiliated schools in Ontario can be found at university colleges in Ontario.

==== University of Alberta ====
St. Joseph's College is the Roman Catholic liberal arts college affiliated with the University of Alberta. The college provides offers courses open to students of both institutions, an on-campus chapel for the celebration of mass during the week, and a coeducational residence.

==== Laurentian University ====
Laurentian University had four federated institutions, three of which were located on the main campus in Sudbury, which offered a variety of degrees in association with the university. The federations were dissolved on 1 May 2021 due to the 2021 Laurentian University financial crisis.

- L’Université de Hearst is French language university-level institution located in Hearst and the only formerly federated institution that is not located on the main Sudbury campus. It is now an independent university in its own right.
- Thorneloe University is affiliated with the Anglican Church of Canada and offered courses in fine arts, theatre, classics, and women's studies. It currently only offers theological programs, which have been continued post-break up of the federation.
- The University of Sudbury was a Catholic, bilingual institution, which offered courses in religious studies, philosophy, indigenous studies and folklore. It is now a French language, secular university, but is not currently accepting students as it restructures.
- Huntington University was focused on arts and humanities studies, is affiliated with the United Church, and offered courses in communication studies, ethics, gerontology, philosophy, religious studies and theology. It is currently not offering degree programs, but is instead operating as an independent student residence.

==== University of Regina ====
The University of Regina has three federated colleges, which offer various degrees in conjunction with the university:

- Luther College, an Evangelical Lutheran liberal arts college;
- Campion College, a Jesuit Catholic liberal arts college;
- First Nations University of Canada, a college offering curriculum developed in partnership with First Nations communities and social support for First Nations students.

All three colleges are located on the University of Regina's main campus, and all students of the federated colleges are also registered as students of the university.

==== University of Saskatchewan ====
St. Thomas More College is the Roman Catholic liberal arts college federated with the University of Saskatchewan, and is located on the university's campus in Saskatoon. The administration and financial details of the college are autonomous, but the academics are closely interrelated with the university.

==== University of Toronto ====
The University of Toronto is a collegiate university consisting of a federation of 11 colleges, with various degrees of independence and autonomy, organized under a central Governing Council.

==== University of Waterloo ====
The University of Waterloo has four affiliated institutions, collectively referred to as the "university colleges" or "church colleges": Conrad Grebel University College, a college owned by the Mennonite Church Eastern Canada that offers programs in peace and conflict studies, music, and Mennonite studies; Renison University College, a public college affiliated with the Anglican Church of Canada that offers programs in social development studies, social work, East Asian studies, and languages; St. Jerome's University, a public Roman Catholic liberal arts university established in 1865; and United College (formerly named St. Paul's University College), a public college formerly affiliated with the United Church of Canada that offers programs on social justice and environmental issues.

All students can take courses offered by the university and any of the colleges, degrees bear the university's name and seal, and admission to college residences is not restricted based on religious beliefs.

==== University of Windsor ====
The University of Windsor has three affiliated institutions: Assumption University, a Roman Catholic university offering graduate degree programs in religious subjects; Canterbury College, a public liberal arts college affiliated with the Anglican Church of Canada; and Iona College, a public liberal arts college formerly affiliated with the United Church of Canada.

==== University of Western Ontario ====
The University of Western Ontario has three affiliate colleges: Huron University College, a public liberal arts college established in 1863 and affiliated with the Anglican Church of Canada; Brescia University College, a public Roman Catholic women's college established in 1919 by the Ursulines; and King's University College, a public Roman Catholic co-educational college established in 1954 that offers programs in liberal arts, business, social justice, and theology (through an affiliation with St. Peter's Seminary).

UWO previously had affiliation agreements with other institutions, including Alma College, Assumption University and Wilfrid Laurier University.

=== India ===
Several thousand schools affiliated with larger universities educate a large number of undergraduates in India.

=== Pakistan ===
Similar arrangements exist between universities and affiliated colleges in Pakistan.

=== United Kingdom ===
In England and Wales, the term federated school is used to refer to schools that are part of a school federation, which are groups of schools that share one governing body or collaborate through a shared committee.

Historically, affiliated colleges have existed at some universities in the UK. These include:

==== University of Cambridge ====
The University of Cambridge affiliated university colleges in the UK from the late 19th century. Students who had completed two years at these institutions were permitted to reduce the time spent getting an undergraduate degree at Cambridge by a year. The affiliated colleges in 1914 were:

- St David's College, Lampeter
- University College of Wales, Aberystwyth
- University College, Nottingham
- St Edmund's College, Old Hall, Ware
- Hartley University College, Southampton
- University College of South Wales and Monmouthshire, Cardiff
- Royal Albert Memorial University College, Exeter

==== Durham University ====
Durham University has had various forms of affiliated college from the late 19th century, including "affiliated colleges" where students could study for Durham degrees (for which provision still exists in the statutes as of 2020, although without any institutions having this status), "associated theological colleges" where students could study for the Durham License in Theology and could count the three years spent on that course against two years on the BA course at Durham, and "Institute of Education colleges" for teacher training.

The affiliated colleges were:

- Sunderland Technical College (1930–1963)
- Codrington College, Barbados (1875–1965)
- Fourah Bay College, Sierra Leone (1876–1967)

The category of associated theological colleges existed from the 1870s until 1949. It included at various times:

Australia

- St John's (Armidale, NSW) (1912)
- Moore Theological College (Sydney) (1910)

Canada

- Queen's College (St John's, Newfoundland) (1912)

Isle of Man

- Bishop Wilson Theological College

Jamaica

- St Peter's College (1910)

New Zealand

- Selwyn College (Dunedin) (1910)

Nigeria

- St Andrew's College, Oyo (1924)

United Kingdom

- St Aidan's College, Birkenhead (1876)
- St Augustine's College, Canterbury (1877)
- The Bible Churchmen's Missionary College, Clifton
- Burgh Missionary College (closed 1936)
- Chichester Theological College (1878)
- Cumbrae Theological College (1877)
- Dorchester Missionary College
- Edinburgh Theological College (1878)
- Gloucester Theological College
- Highbury College, London
- Church Missionary Society College, Islington
- Lichfield Theological College (1876)
- Lincoln Theological College
- Salisbury Theological College
- Truro Theological College
- St Boniface Missionary College, Warminster
- The Theological Department of King's College London (1877)
- The Theological Department of Queen's College, Birmingham (1876)

Colleges affiliated to Durham University's Institute of Education from the 1940s to the 1970s included:

- Alnwick Training College
- Bede College
- Darlington Training College/Darlington College of Education
- Domestic Science College
- Kenton Lodge Training College
- Middlesbrough Day Training College
- Middleton St George College of Education
- Neville’s Cross College
- Newcastle upon Tyne Training College (now part of Northumbria University)
- St Hild’s College
- St Mary’s College, Fenham
- Sunderland College of Education
- Sunderland Training College/Polytechnic (now Sunderland University)
- Teesside College of Education (now part of Teesside University)
- Wynyard Hall Training College

==== University of London ====
As first created in 1836, the University of London was an examining board for its affiliated colleges (initially only University College London and King's College London, often referred to as the 'founding colleges'), including a number of Catholic institutions and dissenting academies whose students could not take degrees at Oxford, Cambridge or Durham. This system continued until 1858, when University of London examinations were thrown open to all students with the establishment of the external degree system. The University of London later became a federal university in 1900. By 1858, the following institutions (as they are given in the 1858 charter) had been recognised as affiliated colleges:

- University College London
- King's College London
- Queen's College Belfast
- Queen's College Galway
- Queen's College Cork
- St Cuthbert's College, Ushaw
- Stonyhurst College
- Manchester New College
- St Mary's College, Oscott
- St Patrick's College, Carlow
- St Edmund's College, near Ware
- Spring Hill College, Moseley, near Birmingham
- The College, Regents Park (late Stepney College)
- College of St Gregory the Great, Downside, near Bath
- Countess of Huntingdon's College at Cheshunt
- The Baptist College at Bristol
- Airedale College, Undercliffe, near Bradford
- Protestant Dissenters' College at Rotherham
- Presbyterian College at Carmarthen
- St Kyran's College, Kilkenny
- Huddersfield College
- Lancashire Independent College
- Wesley College near Sheffield
- Queen's College, Birmingham
- Wesleyan Collegiate Institution, Taunton
- Western College, Plymouth
- West of England Dissenters' Proprietary School, Taunton
- St Patrick's College, Thurles
- New College, London
- Owen's College, Manchester
- Bedford Grammar Schools
- Brecon Independent College
- Horton College, Bradford, Yorkshire
- Hackney Theological Seminary
- Trevecca College, Brecon
- Springfield College, Ennis
- Bishop Stortford Collegiate School
- Working Men's College, London
- Queen's College, Liverpool

==== University of Oxford ====
The University of Oxford affiliated university colleges in the UK from the late 19th century. Students who had completed two years at these institutions were permitted to reduce the time spent getting an undergraduate degree at Oxford by a year. The affiliated colleges in 1906 were:

- St David's College, Lampeter
- University College, Nottingham
- Firth College, Sheffield
- Reading College, Reading
- Hartley University College, Southampton

=== United States ===
==== Columbia University ====
In the United States, Columbia University is associated in various ways with several affiliated schools. Most notably, Barnard College is legally and financially separate from Columbia but its students have access to the instruction and facilities of Columbia. A similar arrangement exists with Teachers College, which since its affiliation with Columbia has served as the University's Faculty and Department of Education. Columbia has more limited cooperative arrangements and joint programs and degrees with two nearby independent institutions: Union Theological Seminary and Jewish Theological Seminary.

==== Harvard University ====
Radcliffe College's relationship to Harvard University resembled that of Barnard to Columbia until Radcliffe was completely merged into Harvard in 1999.

==== Yale University ====
The Yale Divinity School, part of Yale University, is associated with two affiliated schools, Berkeley Divinity School and the Andover-Newton Seminary. Both Berkeley (from 1854 until 1971) and Andover-Newton (from 1807 to 2017) were once entirely independent seminaries and they still maintain their own Boards of Trustees and distinctive missions. Berkeley also still awards its own diplomas and certificates in Anglican ministry. But the students of both affiliated schools are also enrolled at, and receive degrees from, the Yale Divinity School and both their students and their faculty are fully integrated into the life of the larger institution.

==== University of California ====
The University of California College of the Law, San Francisco is affiliated, as its name suggests, with the University of California, but it is not directly governed by the Regents of the University of California.
