= University colleges in Ontario =

A university college is a federated or affiliated academic university institution of a larger public university (often referred to as the "parent" campus). Federated and affiliated colleges have existed in Ontario, Canada, for over a century. The establishment of these institutions came from Christian religious groups. There are a total of 24 such university colleges in Ontario, with 10 primarily offering secular programs and 14 primarily offering theological programs.

University colleges share a number of characteristics:

- Focus on undergraduate studies in the liberal arts and post-degree professional programs in the helping professions (i.e. social work, teaching, etc.)
- Experiential learning opportunities and student life rooted in altruism and social justice
- Residence for students who wish to live on campus
- A smaller campus community within a greater campus community (this experience is often advertised as the "best of both worlds")
- Small class sizes
- Student services and resources exclusively for those students for whom the university college is their home campus, referred to as "co-registration" due to simultaneous access to services of parent campus

== Affiliated versus federated university colleges ==
"Affiliated" and "federated" are often used interchangeably when describing a university college, but they have somewhat different legal relationship with the parent campus. For example, affiliated university colleges typically suspend their degree-granting powers so their students are able to officially earn their degree from the “parent” institution. A federated university college differs in that, although it is a type of affiliation, it is where "two or more institutions come together to create a new university that is recognized by civic authorities and is eligible for government funding" (MacDonald, 2016).

== List of Ontario university colleges ==
Ontario affiliated and federated University College Institutions Primarily Offering Secular Degree Programs
Public University	Federated and affiliated institution	Year of federation or affiliation	Religious heritage
University of Ottawa / Université d’Ottawa	Saint Paul University / Université Saint-Paul	1965	Catholic
University of Toronto	University of St. Michael's College	1910	Catholic
University of Toronto	University of Trinity College	1904	Anglican
University of Toronto	Victoria University	1890	United
University of Waterloo	Conrad Grebel University College	1963	Mennonite
University of Waterloo	Renison University College	1960	Anglican
University of Waterloo	St. Jerome's University	1959	Catholic
University of Waterloo	United College	1961	United (fully secular since 2005)
Western University	Huron University College	1878	Anglican
Western University	King's University College	1954	Catholic

Affiliated and Federated Institutions Primarily Offering Theological Programs
Public university	Affiliated or federated institution	Year of affiliation or federation	Religious heritage
Brock University	Concordia Lutheran Theological Seminary	1976	Lutheran
McMaster University	McMaster Divinity College	1957	Baptist
Queen’s University	Queen’s School of Religion	1912	United
University of Toronto	Emmanuel College	1925	United
University of Toronto	Knox College	1890	Presbyterian
University of Toronto	Regis College	1978	Catholic
University of Toronto	St. Augustine’s Seminary	1978	Catholic
University of Toronto	Toronto School of Theology	1979	Multiple
University of Toronto	Wycliffe College	1885	Anglican
University of Windsor	Assumption University	1919 (Western), 1963 (Windsor)	Catholic
University of Windsor	Canterbury College	1957 (Assumption), 1963 (Windsor)	Anglican
University of Windsor	Iona College	1963	United
Western University	St. Peter's Seminary	1912	Catholic
Wilfrid Laurier University	Martin Luther University College	1914	Lutheran

Note: Some theological institutions are affiliated with another affiliated institution, which in turn is affiliated with a publicly supported university.

== Former affiliated university colleges in Ontario ==
A number of university colleges were affiliated with Laurentian University / Université Laurentienne until 2021 financial crisis:

- Huntington University was affiliated from 1960.
- Thorneloe University was affiliated from 1963.
- Université de Hearst was affiliated with the University of Sudbury in 1957, and then Laurentian from 1963.
- University of Sudbury / Université de Sudbury was affiliated from 1960.

== Former University colleges in Ontario ==
- Brescia University College was affiliated with Western University until its closure in 2024.
- Dominican University College was affiliated with Carleton University from 2012 until its closure in 2024.
