= Iona College (disambiguation) =

Iona University (formerly Iona College) is a private Catholic college in New Rochelle, New York.

Iona College may also refer to:

- Iona College Brisbane, Australia
- Iona College, Havelock North, Hawkes Bay, New Zealand
- Iona Presentation College, Perth, Western Australia
- Iona College (Windsor, Ontario), Windsor, Ontario, Canada
