= Hilary M. Lips =

Emerita professor and research faculty in psychology

- Born: 1949 (age 76–77); Ottawa, Canada
- Occupations: Emerita professor and research faculty in Psychology

Academic background
- Education: University of Ottawa; University of Windsor
- Alma mater: Northwestern University (M.A., Ph.D.)

Academic work
- Discipline: Social psychology
- Sub-discipline: Gender studies
- Institutions: University of Winnipeg; Radford University
- Notable works: Women, Men and the Psychology of Power; Sex and Gender: An Introduction; A New Psychology of Women: Gender, Culture and Ethnicity; Gender: The Basics
- Website: sites.radford.edu/~hlips/

Hilary M. Lips (born 1949) is an Emerita professor and research faculty in Psychology at Radford University. She is the founder of the Center for Gender Studies at Radford University and was its director from 1989 to 2015, and was the chair of the Department of Psychology from 2003 to 2015. She is the author of a variety of books, including Women, Men and the Psychology of Power; Sex and Gender: An Introduction; A New Psychology of Women: Gender, Culture and Ethnicity; and Gender: The Basics.

== Early life and education ==
Hilary Lips was born in 1949 in Ottawa, Canada. She attended the University of Ottawa for Science from 1965 to 1967, completed a B.A. in Psychology at the University of Windsor in 1970, an M.A. in Social Psychology at Northwestern University in 1973, and a Ph.D. in Social Psychology at Northwestern University in 1974. She has credited reading The Feminine Mystique during her undergraduate studies as the beginning of her development as a feminist.

At Northwestern, she joined the Evanston Women's Liberation Center, which hosted meetings and engaged in activities to support the Equal Rights Amendment and women running for political office, including Shirley Chisholm. While at Northwestern, Lips read Kinder, Küche, Kirche by Naomi Weisstein, and found the article to be "such a powerful critique of psychology's approach to sex differences" that "probably" influenced her thinking on the relationship between feminism and psychology.

== Career ==
Lips was an assistant professor at the University of Winnipeg from 1974 to 1980, an associate professor from 1980 to 1987, and a professor in psychology from 1987 to 1989. She was also an adjunct professor in Psychology at the University of Manitoba from 1985 to 1990, and the acting coordinator of the Women's Studies Program at the University of Winnipeg in 1988.

At Radford University, she was a professor in psychology from 1989 to 2015, the director of the Women's Studies Program from 1999 to 2002, the founder and director of the Center for Gender Studies from 1989 to 2015, and the chair of the Department of Psychology from 2003 to 2015.

=== Writing career ===
Lips co-authored The Psychology of Sex Differences with Nina Colwill, which was published in 1978. In a 1979 review for Canadian Psychology, Elinor Ames writes, "Their approach to topic areas in which sex differences have been found is first to consider the evidence for a possible genetic basis, then for hormomal or other physiological influences, and finally to submit the area to a social learning analysis, using concepts from classical conditioning, instrumental learning, and modelling" and "they often go beyond the psychological evidence to consider the wider social world within which the psychological facts operate."

Women, Men, and the Psychology of Power was published in 1981, and in a review for Canadian Psychology, Rhona Steinberg notes that Lips "presents her ideas from a dual perspective, that of a feminist and that of a social psychologist" and that Lips "maintains that some of the observable differences in personality characteristics between females and males may be a function of structural variables, such as differential power bases, rather than stable inherited traits." Joane Norris reviewed the book for Atlantis: Critical Studies in Gender, Culture & Social Justice, writing that Lips' approach to power differences between men and women "seems ideal because it provides a framework for the analysis of power relations and, more importantly, because its contextual approach assumes that inequities are created or exaggerated by socio-cultural forces. While such forces may be difficult to overcome fully, they are at least identifiable and somewhat malleable."

The first edition of Sex and Gender: An Introduction was published in 1988, and the seventh edition was published in 2020. In a review of the fourth edition for Teaching Sociology, B. Gerry Coulter notes the expanded bibliography and writes, "This contributes directly to one of the text's major strengths: its ability to evaluate and resituate major issues in light of new research. Research, since the first edition in 1988, makes it abundantly clear that studies devoted to gender related issues are of the utmost importance."

The first edition of Gender: The Basics was published in 2014, and in a review for E-International Relations, Caron Gentry writes, "The arguments and examples that Lips uses throughout the book make one thing very clear: it is time for the world, not just particular parts of the world or particular populations, to face up to the implications of gender inequality. [...] These are political problems that involve thinking about how resources are disbursed and how such dispersal is dependent upon the gender hierarchy."

== Selected works ==
- Lips, H. M., & Colwill, N. L. (1978). The Psychology of Sex Differences. Englewood Cliffs, NJ: Prentice-Hall
- Lips, H. M. (1981). Women, Men and the Psychology of Power. Englewood Cliffs, NJ: Prentice-Hall
- Lips, H. M. (1991). Women, Men and Power. Mountain View, CA: Mayfield
- Lips, H. M. (2016). A New Psychology of Women: Gender, Culture and Ethnicity. Fourth edition. Long Grove, IL: Waveland Press. (Third Edition. Boston: McGraw-Hill. 2006, reissued 2010 by Waveland Press; Second Edition, 2003; First edition, 1999, Mountain View, CA: Mayfield Publishers)
- Lips, H. M. (2019). Gender: The Basics. Second edition. Oxford, UK: Routledge. (First edition, 2014)
- Lips, H. M. (2020). Sex & Gender: An Introduction. Seventh edition. Long Grove, IL: Waveland Press. (Sixth edition, Boston: McGraw-Hill. 2008; Fifth edition, 2005; Fourth edition: 2000; Third edition: Mountain View, CA: Mayfield, 1997; Second edition: 1992; First edition: 1988)
- Lips, H. M. (2021). Women across Cultures. Cambridge University Press

== Honors and awards ==
- 1984 Elected Fellow to the American Psychological Association, Division 35 (Psychology of Women)
- 1988 Elected Fellow to the Canadian Psychological Association
- 1992 Distinguished Publication Award, Association for Women in Psychology (for Women, Men, and Power)
- 1997 Elected Fellow to the American Psychological Association, Division 1 (General Psychology)
- 1997 Elected Fellow to the American Psychological Association, Division 9 (Society for the Psychological Study of Social Issues)
- 1998 Distinguished American Scholar Award, New Zealand-United States Educational Foundation
- 2006 Distinguished Member Award, Canadian Psychological Association, Section on Women and Psychology

== Personal life ==
Lips married Wayne K. Andrew in 1986.
