= Juanita Westmoreland-Traoré =

Canadian judge

Juanita Westmoreland-Traoré CM OQ
- Born: March 10, 1942 (age 84); Verdun, Quebec
- Education: Doctorate in Public Law (1972); Dipl. d'etudes superieures en sciences administratives (1968); LL 1, Universite de Paris/Universite de Montreal (1966), BA, Marianopolis College (1963)
- Occupation: Judge
- Known for: 1st Black Canadian judge in Quebec

Juanita Westmoreland-Traore, CM OQ (born March 10, 1942) is the first black judge in the history of Quebec. She is also the first black dean of a law school (the University of Windsor Faculty of Law) in Canada's history.

== Early life and education ==
Westmoreland-Traoré was born in Verdun, now part of Montreal, Quebec, in 1942, the daughter of immigrants from Guyana. She studied at Marianopolis College, and subsequently obtained a law degree from the Université de Montréal (1966) and a doctorate from the University of Paris.

== Career ==
She was called to the Quebec Bar in 1969, and began practising law in 1970 with the law firm of Mergler, Melançon. She has also been a member of the Ontario Bar since 1997. During the 1970s, Westmoreland-Traoré taught at the Université de Montréal from 1972 to 1976, and from 1976 to 1991 at the Université du Québec à Montréal. In 1990, Westmoreland-Traoré was an arbitrator to the Human Rights Tribunal of Quebec. Westmoreland-Traoré was also a member of the Office de protection des consommateurs du Québec from 1979 to 1983. From 1983 to 1985, she was a Commissioner for the Canadian Human Rights Commission. In 1985, she became the first chair of Quebec's Council on Cultural Communities and Immigration.

From 1991 to 1995, she was Employment Equity Commissioner of Ontario. In this role, she set up support to monitor the introduction of employment equity planning to seventeen thousand Ontario businesses. From 1996 to 1999 she was the dean of the University of Windsor's law faculty. She was appointed a Judge of the Court of Quebec for the District of Montreal in 1999.

== Honours and awards ==
In 1991, she was made an Officer of the National Order of Quebec. Westmoreland-Traoré has received other awards, including from Canadian Jewish Congress, the Montreal Association of Black Business Persons and Professionals, and the Canadian Bar Association. In 2008, she was awarded the Quebec Human Rights Commission's Rights and Liberties Prize for her career-long fight against discrimination. In 2021, she received the Medal of the Barreau de Montréal.

In March 2013, Université du Québec à Montréal's Département des sciences juridiques founded the Juanita Westmoreland-Traoré scholarship. The $3000 scholarship is to be awarded annually to a single undergraduate law student who uses their training to promote human rights, social justice and equality. Sameer Zuberi, a human rights advocate of ten years, was the bursary's first recipient in April 2014.

Westmoreland-Traoré received honorary doctorates from University of Ottawa in 1993, Université du Québec à Montréal in 2001, and McGill University in 2018.

In June 2026, she was named a Member of the Order of Canada.
