= Bomben =

Bomben may refer to:

- Ryan Bomben
- Stefano Bomben
- 12834 Bomben
