= Frank A. DeMarco =

Italian-Canadian academic administrator (1921–2023)

Frank DeMarco
- Born: Frank Anthony DeMarco; February 14, 1921; Podargoni, Italy
- Died: May 18, 2023 (aged 102)

Academic background
- Education: University of Toronto (BASc, MASc, PhD)
- Thesis: Part I The determination of the relative acidity at the glue-line in plywood Part II The synthesis of cyanine dyes from 2:2'-bilepidyl (1951)

Academic work
- Discipline: Chemical engineering
- Institutions: University of Windsor

Frank Anthony DeMarco (February 14, 1921 – May 18, 2023) was an Italian-born Canadian educator and administrator who had a central role in the founding of the University of Windsor in Windsor, Ontario, Canada.

== Early life and education ==
Frank Anthony DeMarco was born February 14, 1921, in Podargoni, Italy. His family was reunited in North Bay, Ontario in 1929. He attended the University of Toronto where he earned a BASc in 1942, MASc in 1943, and PhD in 1951, all in chemical engineering. His doctoral thesis, published in two parts, focused on properties of adhesives used in plywood construction.

During the Second World War, DeMarco was involved in work supporting the Canadian war effort that was taking place in laboratories like the University of Toronto. His main research dealt with adhesives, including those used in the construction materials in the de Havilland Mosquito combat aircraft.

== Academic career ==
DeMarco was an instructor in chemical engineering at the University of Toronto from 1943 to 1946. He came to Windsor in 1946 after he was recruited by the Basilian Fathers, who were endeavouring to meet the demand for higher education that was being created by returning World War II veterans, and the growth of the City of Windsor. He joined the staff of Assumption College with a mandate to offer science instruction and to create the original science laboratories in the landmark War Memorial Hall.

Beginning in 1953, Assumption College received its own charter to become an independent degree-granting institution and thereby ended its affiliation with the University of Western Ontario. Serving Assumption College, from 1946 to 1956, in several capacities, DeMarco was assistant professor, then Professor, and first Head of the Department of Chemistry. He was the first to teach pre-engineering courses, such as descriptive geometry, surveying, and mechanical drawing in the regular day program.

Concurrently, from 1949 to 1956, DeMarco served as Assumption's director of athletics and coached their intercollegiate football team, and later their basketball team. He also initiated and promoted an intramural sports program.

DeMarco was the first to propose that growth and long-term financial viability could only be achieved through the creation of a non-denominational college, which would receive provincial grants. His conception started down the path toward implementation with the creation and incorporation of Essex College in 1954. The eventual task of spinning off an autonomous non-denominational affiliate from a Catholic university was a very complex undertaking, and was the culmination of over two years of negotiations. DeMarco, along with the two Basilian Fathers, Reverend E.C. LeBel and Reverend Norbert J. Ruth, are considered the three central figures in the founding of Essex College.

In 1956, Assumption College became Assumption University and, in the academic year 1956–57, Essex College began accepting students and offering courses. From the beginning, DeMarco promoted his vision for the development of a complete academic experience of degree programs, graduate work, and research at the young Essex College. Originally offering degrees in mathematics and sciences, Essex College later on added engineering, nursing and business.

DeMarco was the inaugural Principal of Essex College from 1959 to 1963. Concurrently, he was also acting head of the university's engineering department after being appointed the first dean of applied science in 1959. He held both positions until 1963.

As head of Essex College, DeMarco was able to considerably expand the resources available, and oversaw a very ambitious building and hiring program. The first building created with Essex College funds was the library, now known as the West Wing of the expanded university library. During this period DeMarco also identified the need for a "state-of-the-art" engineering building, and under his leadership, funding was secured amounting to CA$5,000,000 (equaling approximately CA$40,000,000 in 2013 value).

== University of Windsor ==
In 1963, Assumption University and Essex College together formed a new public institution, the University of Windsor, with E.C. LeBel, president of Assumption University at its helm. DeMarco became the inaugural vice-president of the University of Windsor, a post which he held until 1979.

Under three different presidents in all, DeMarco had full responsibility during most of this period for a very broad range of both administrative and academic matters. He was the sole vice-president in the organization for many of those years.

During DeMarco's administrative career, he maintained his interest in scientific research, particularly as it applied to society's well-being. A good illustration of this emphasis on social responsibility was his groundbreaking report for the Ontario Ministry of Health in 1974, titled "Report of the Committee to Inquire into the Effect on Human Health of Lead in the Environment".

DeMarco was also instrumental in establishing collaborative dialogue between the community's business/industry and the academia of the City of Windsor. He was an innovator in the establishment of advisory boards and forums that gave guidance and feedback to University leaders and policy makers in whether curriculum content was evolving in concert with industry and society's needs.

To round out DeMarco's academic career, which had begun in the classroom decades before, he decided in 1980 to return to the classroom and research, as a professor of engineering. At the same time, he was also appointed to the Board of Governors of the International Development Research Centre, a Canadian government-sponsored think tank to support ideas and research for the application of science and technology to solving problems of the developing regions of the world. In 1984 he was appointed by Premier William Davis as a member of the Ontario Council of University Affairs.

DeMarco also made a significant imprint on many other aspects of education in the Windsor community: as founding chair of the Board of Governors of St Clair College of Applied Arts and Technology (1967–68), elected member of the Essex County School Board, President of the Greater Windsor Foundation (1976–77), member of a number of industry-based scholarship selection committees and other community initiatives.

DeMarco retired from the University of Windsor in 1986 after a forty-year career. That same year he was awarded an honorary doctorate of education and was also appointed professor emeritus, Faculty of Engineering.

== Athletic career ==
Frank DeMarco was an outstanding athlete and received the "University of Toronto Most Versatile Athlete Award." He played in what was the highest level of Canadian football in his day, known as the Ontario Rugby Football Union (ORFU), a league that competed for the Grey Cup, and which later evolved into the CFL in the late fifties. DeMarco played for the Toronto Balmy Beach Beachers, in the position of end, for three seasons 1943, 1944 and 1945. When he moved to Windsor in 1946 he played quarterback in the same league for the Windsor Rockets.

In hockey, he played three seasons as a defenceman (1943–45) for the Toronto Staffords, in the Ontario Hockey Association. In 1943 he pitched for Coppercliff Redmen in the Nickel Belt Baseball League when they won Northern Ontario Sr. "A" Championship. In later life he excelled in curling and in golf.

In 1987, DeMarco was inducted into the University of Windsor Alumni Sports Hall of Fame in recognition of his outstanding contribution to sports as an intercollegiate coach at the university. In 1996 he was named to the Windsor-Essex County Sports Hall of Fame as a founder.

== Personal life ==
DeMarco married Mary Valenti in 1948. They settled in Windsor, Ontario originally, and then from 1961 on, in nearby LaSalle, Ontario. They raised twelve children together.

Among DeMarco's many grandchildren who followed in his tradition as exemplars of combined academic and athletic excellence are the three Moore brothers, Mark Moore, Steve Moore and Dominic Moore. The brothers all attended Harvard University, and were all three drafted in the National Hockey League entry draft.

Frank and Mary DeMarco are patrons of the University of Windsor DeMarco Trophy (annual scholarship awarded to athlete-scholar), and of the DeMarco Environmental Engineering Award, and of the Mary DeMarco Fine Arts Scholarship.

DeMarco turned 100 in 2021, and died on May 18, 2023, at the age of 102.

== Honours ==
DeMarco was the recipient of many Commonwealth and Government of Canada awards and other honours:

- Queen Elizabeth II Coronation Medal, 1953
- Canadian Centennial Medal, 1967
- Queen Elizabeth II Silver Jubilee Medal, 1977
- Italian of the Year Award, 1987
- 125th Anniversary of the Confederation of Canada Medal, 1992
- University of Windsor Clark Award, 2009
