= University of Windsor Faculty of Law =

Law school in Windsor, Ontario, Canada

Faculty of Law
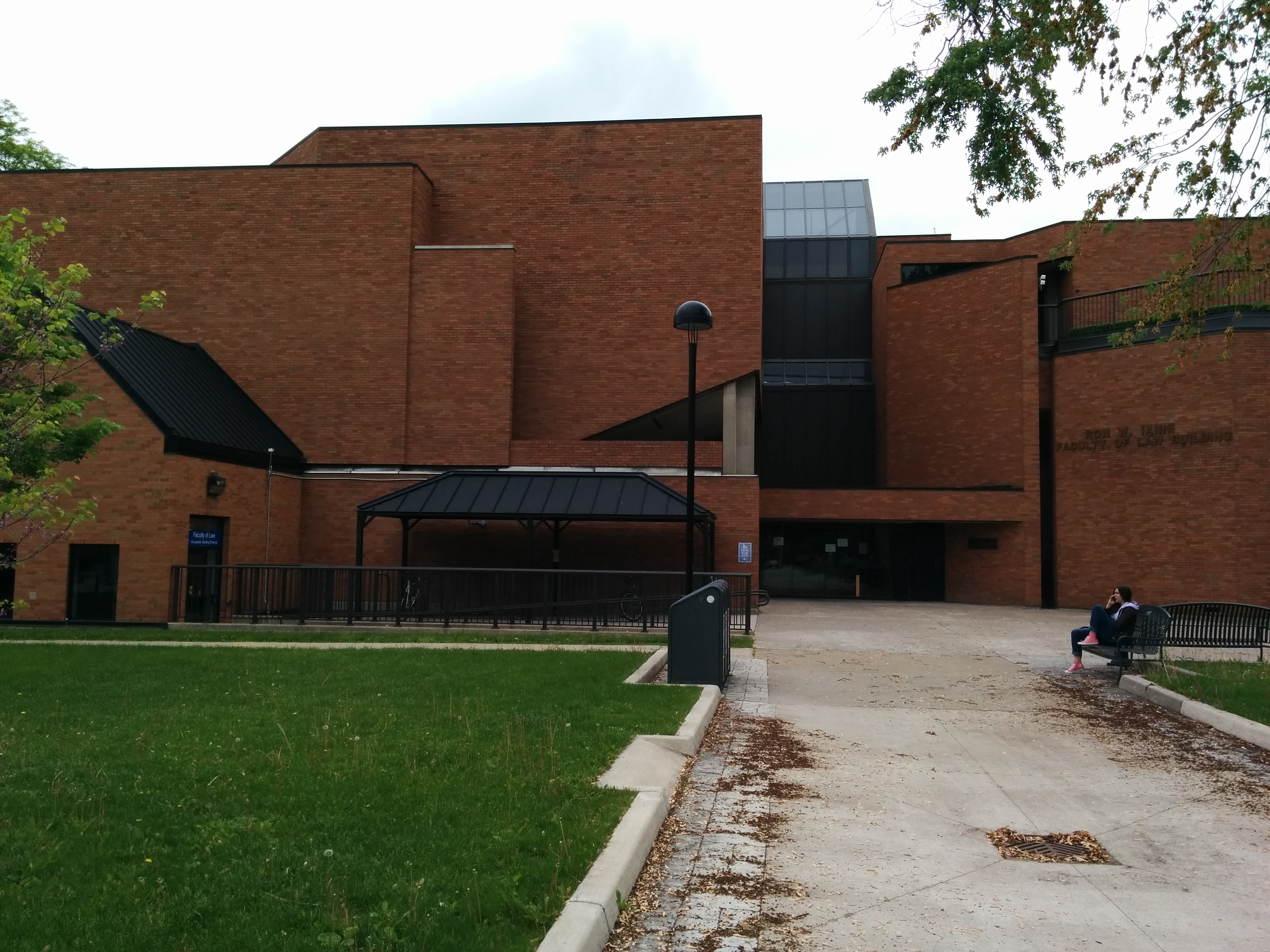
- Ron W. Ianni Faculty of Law Building, University of Windsor
- Motto: Bonitatem, disciplinam, scientiam
- Motto in English: Goodness, discipline, knowledge
- Type: Faculty (law school)
- Established: 1967
- Affiliations: University of Windsor
- Dean: Reem Bahdi
- Faculty: 109
- Students: 712
- Location: Windsor, Ontario, Canada; 42°18′24″N 83°3′57″W
- Website: www.uwindsor.ca/law/

The Faculty of Law (Windsor Law) is a faculty of the University of Windsor in Windsor, Ontario, Canada. The first class of students matriculated in 1968, and the current building was opened in 1970. The Faculty has grown immensely over the past 50 years, increasing its national profile through its innovations in research and from thousands of alumni across Canada and the world. The 2017 endowment to the Faculty of Law was $10.2 million. The Faculty is also the current academic host institution of the Canadian Bar Review (CBR), the most frequently cited journal by the Supreme Court of Canada.

Windsor Law publishes two journals: the faculty edited Windsor Yearbook of Access to Justice and the student run law journal Windsor Review of Legal and Social Issues. Students can take advantage of faculty expertise in aboriginal law, commercial/corporate law, evidence law, fiduciary law, freedom of religion & expression, human rights law, insurance law, intellectual property law, international law, labour law, poverty law, remedies, and tax law.

== Admissions ==
Admissions to the Faculty of Law have become increasingly more competitive in recent years as the profile of the school has expanded and as more students seek application to Canadian law schools. Each year around 2000 applications for the J.D. program at Windsor Law are received for the 165 places in the first-year class, an acceptance rate of 8%. For the Canadian & American Dual J.D. program, 700 applications are received for 85 places in the Dual J.D. first-year class.

The Faculty of Law takes a holistic approach in admitting students that considers seven unique factors:

- Undergraduate performance: Undergraduate GPA, academic awards and prizes, the level of degrees obtained;
- Work experience: Qualifications, vocational skills, organizational and administrative skills;
- Community involvement: Religious/athletic/social/community service activities;
- Personal accomplishments: Extracurricular activities, hobbies, artistic or athletic accomplishments, language skills;
- Career objectives of the applicant and how they intend to employ their legal education;
- Special personal considerations: Illness, bereavement, family responsibilities, other special circumstances;
- LSAT score

== Program ==
The flagship J.D. program offered at the Faculty of Law comprises mandatory first year courses as mandated by the Law Society of Upper Canada. Second and third year students can choose from a variety of courses in order to specialize in areas of particular interest to them.

The compulsory first year curriculum includes:

- Constitutional Law
- Contract Law
- Criminal Law and Procedure
- Legal Research and Writing
- Property Law
- Access to Justice (half semester)
- Indigenous Legal Orders (half semester)

The Faculty also offers a dual J.D. degree program with the University of Detroit Mercy which grants both a Canadian and American JD. The program is completed in three years, including summers, with students taking courses at both the University of Windsor and the University of Detroit Mercy to fulfil the requirements for both degrees.

Windsor Law offers a joint J.D./M.B.A. program with the Odette School of Business.

In 2010, the faculty began offering a joint Master of Social Work/Juris Doctor (M.S.W./J.D.) program. Students can take either three or four years to complete the dual degree. A Master of Social Work is normally a two-year professional program without a Bachelor of Social Work; it is a one-year program if entrants already hold a B.S.W. degree.

In 2016, the first class of students were admitted to the L.L.M of Windsor Law.

== Facilities ==
In 2018, the University of Windsor announced that the Faculty of Law building would undergo a $35 million renovation. The new construction began at the end of 2020 with an initial timeline of 2 years. However, due to delays caused by the COVID-19 pandemic, the project is expected to be completed in the summer of 2023.

The finished building will have the capacity to accommodate 720 students.

== Journals ==
The Windsor Review of Legal and Social Issues (WRLSI) is one of the few multi-disciplinary legal academic student-run journals in Canada. First published in 1989, the WRLSI was initially an annual publication. However, due to the increase in submissions received and recognition of its journal, the WRLSI now publishes two volumes each year containing essays from academics, the judiciary, practitioners, law students, and university students both at the graduate and undergraduate levels. The legal journal has also been made available through electronic databases such as Lexis Advance Quicklaw, Westlaw, and Hein Online.

While the journal publishes primarily academics and practitioners, the Annual Canadian Law Student Conference is an annual event which showcases the research and scholarship of LL.B., J.D., LL.M., and Ph.D. students across Canada, and provides a forum for discussion and feedback from practitioners and peers. The Windsor Review of Legal and Social Issues invites all law students to submit original, scholarly work on any legal topic with a Canadian nexus to be considered for presentation at the 5th Annual Canadian Law Student Conference. Papers should not exceed 20,000 words including footnotes. Footnotes should conform to the Canadian Guide to Uniform Legal Citation (McGill Guide, 7th edition). Two papers will be chosen as the “Best Student Papers” which are eligible for an award of $250 each. These awards are generously sponsored by Torys LLP.

Created in 1979, the Windsor Yearbook of Access to Justice was the earliest Canadian journal devoted to the trans-cultural and international study of individuals and groups excluded from the protections of the domestic or international legal orders. The Yearbook is independently refereed, publishes French and English essays and book reviews, is faculty-run and is supported by an advisory board. The Yearbook encourages a wide diversity of essays from a broad range of disciplines, such as anthropology, sociology, philosophy, psychology, history and comparative literature as well as law.

The Faculty of Law at the University of Windsor publishes the Windsor Yearbook of Access to Justice semi-annually with the assistance of grants from the Ontario Law Foundation and support from the Faculty of Law of the University of Windsor. From time to time, additional support has included grants from the Social Sciences and Humanities Research Council of Canada. The Yearbook is indexed and abstracted in the following: CSA Sociological Abstracts, Canadian Association of Learned Journals, Current Law Index, Current Law Journal Content, Index to Canadian Legal Literature, Index to Legal Periodicals and Books, IndexMaster, CPI-Q, Hein Online, LegalTrac, Lexis Advanced Quicklaw, Ulrich's Periodicals Directory, Westlaw & Wilson Web. The Yearbook has continuously been ranked as one of the top subject-specific law reviews in Canada.

== Clinics ==
The Faculty, in conjunction with Legal Aid Ontario, runs a community legal clinic in downtown Windsor called Legal Assistance of Windsor. The clinic is staffed by lawyers, social workers, law students, and social work students, and aims to meet the legal needs of persons traditionally denied access to justice. This clinic provides services in the areas of landlord-tenant, social benefits, and immigration and refugee law. It also assists clients in applications for compensation from the Criminal Injuries Compensation Board of Ontario.

The University of Windsor runs a second legal clinic, Community Legal Aid, on the campus of the university. This clinic is a Student Legal Aid Services Society (SLASS) clinic, which is staffed primarily by volunteer law students and overseen by supervising lawyers, called review counsel. This clinic operates primarily in the areas of criminal law, landlord tenant law, and small claims matters. The clinic offers free legal services to those who qualify financially and all full-time undergraduate students of the university.

In conjunction with the University of Detroit Mercy School of Law, the Faculty has collaboratively created the International Intellectual Property Law Clinic (IP Clinic). The IP Clinic is the only intellectual property clinic that services clients in multiple jurisdictions while allowing students to participate in the practice of international IP law. The IP clinic has received certification from both the United States Patent and Trademark Office (USPTO) and the Canadian Intellectual Property Office (CIPO).

The focus of the IP Clinic is to provide intellectual property advice and services to small business and individuals working on entrepreneurial projects, including student entrepreneurs and innovators. Participating students gain experience from conducting patent and trademark searches, drafting and filing prosecution applications, and providing advice on international intellectual property matters.

Another partnership with a Michigan university, Wayne State University Law School, led to the creation of the Transnational Environmental Law Clinic. This practical clinic allows students to gain experience with international environmental legal issues surrounding air quality, environmental justice, Great Lakes water quality and quantity, invasive species and renewable energy.

== Advocacy programs ==
Students at the Faculty of Law participate in one moot during their first year of studies if they are enrolled in the JD Program, and two moots if enrolled in the JD/JD Program. Participation in these moots enables students to implement classroom learning through appellate-style advocacy. The four top advocates of the first year single JD moot compete in the Windsor Law Lerners Moot during their second year, which is held annually in January. The Lerners Moot is judged by a panel of three judges from different divisions of Ontario courts. Upper year students interested in oral advocacy may participate in a range of national and international competitive moots and advocacy competitions. Some competitive moots and advocacy competitions may also be taken for academic credit.

Several of the national moots and advocacy competitions that the Faculty of Law participates in are:

- Aboriginal Moot (Kawaskimhon)
- Arnup Cup Trial Advocacy Competition
- BLG/Cavalluzzo Labour Moot
- Bowman National Tax Moot (Donald G.)
  - 2019 - 1st Place Team, Best Factum - Appellant
  - 2018 - Best Advocate
  - 2017 - Best Factum - Respondent
  - 2015 - 1st Place Team
  - 2011 - 1st Place Team
- Canadian Client Consultation Competition
  - 2014-2015 - 1st Place Team
- Canadian Competition Law Moot
- Canadian National Negotiation Competition
- Diversity Moot (Julius Alexander Isaac)
  - 2010 - 2011 - First Place Team
- Gale Cup Moot
  - 2012 - 4th Place Team
  - 2017 - 4th Place Team
- INADR Mediation Competition
- International Criminal Court Moot Competition
- Jessup International Law Moot (Philip C.)
- Matthews Dinsdale Arbitration
- Ontario Trial Lawyers Association Moot
- Oxford International Intellectual Property Moot
- Walsh Family Law Negotiation
- Walsh Family Law Moot
  - 2015-2016 1st Place Team
- Winkler Class Actions Moot
  - 2014-2015 First Place Team
- Wilson Moot
  - 2012 - 2013 - 1st Place Team
- Williams & Shier Environmental
- WTO Dispute Resolution Moot

== Student services ==
Student health and well-being are top priorities for the Faculty of Law. Windsor Law has a full-time clinical therapist to assist students with any issues they may face during their time studying at the Faculty. This school has also significantly increased the availability of mental health and wellbeing services, and has taken great steps to ensure that institutional support will continue to be maintained for these services. Fitness bootcamps, board-games club, the Mental Health Awareness Committee and the Pro Bono Students Society are a number of student-led organizations that also contribute towards improving the accessibility of mental health and wellbeing services.

Financial support for students in need has been another priority of the Faculty of Law. Almost $3 million is awarded to students with financial need in bursaries every year.

== Deans ==
1. Mark R. MacGuigan (1967)
2. Walter S. Tarnopolsky (1968–1972)
3. Jon McLaren (1972–1975)
4. Ronald Ianni (1975–1983); Robert Kerr (1981) interim
5. Julio Menezes (1983–1985) acting
6. Neil Gold (1985–1990)
7. Jeffrey Berryman (1990–1995)
8. Neil Gold (1995–1996) acting
9. Juanita Westmoreland‐Traoré (1996–1999)
10. Brian Mazer (1999–2000) interim
11. Bruce Elman (2000–2011); Brian Mazer (2007) acting
12. Myra Tawfik (2011) acting
13. Camile Cameron (2012–2015)
14. Christopher Water (2015–2021)
15. Reem Bahdi (2021–present)

== See also ==
- List of law schools in Canada
