= Mary Jo Haddad =

Canadian nurse and health care executive

Mary Jo Haddad CM is a Canadian nurse and health care executive. After spending 10 years as the president and CEO of The Hospital for Sick Children, Haddad became the first female Chancellor at the University of Windsor.

== Early life and education ==
Haddad was the second oldest of a Lebanese family and grew up in Windsor, Ontario. She attended St. Angela de Merici school and F. J. Brennan Catholic High School. Upon graduating from high school, she enrolled in a nursing diploma program at St. Clair College in 1974 despite her fathers disagreement. After graduating St. Clair College in 1976, she was one of two students offered a job at the Children's Hospital of Michigan. She subsequently spent eight years in Detroit where she worked in the neonatal Intensive care unit. During the eight years she spent in Michigan, Haddad earned a Bachelor of Nursing degree from the University of Windsor (UWindsor) and started a private practice with Leeann Wiseman where she did home visits to families whose children had nearly died as infants.

== Career ==
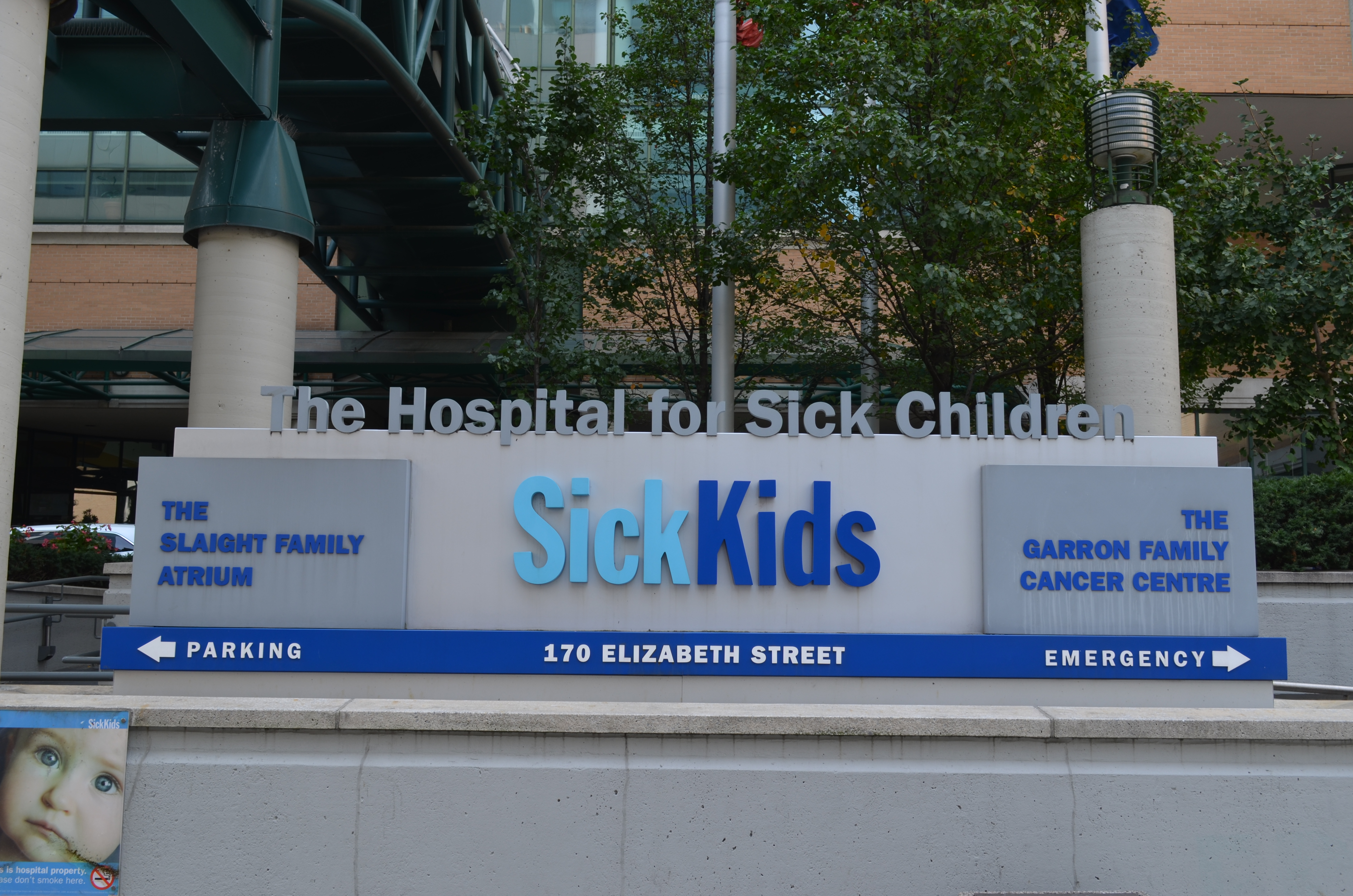
Entrance of The Hospital for Sick Children where Haddad worked for 30 years.

In 1984, Haddad was offered an assistant nurse manager position at The Hospital for Sick Children's neonatal intensive care unit. She moved to Toronto where she met her future husband Jim Forster at a house party thrown by mutual friends. Haddad swiftly moved up the ranks at The Hospital for Sick Children and began nurse administrator in the hospital's pediatric intensive-care unit by 1990. She simultaneously completed graduate studies at the University of Toronto in health administration in 1998 and shortly thereafter became vice-president of child health services at Sick Kids. In August 2002, Haddad assumed the role of chief nurse executive and in June 2003 she became the executive Vice President and chief operating officer. After Alan Gayer departed as the head of Toronto's Hospital for Sick Children in 2004, she was named his acting president and CEO which eventually became permanent. In recognition of her health care leadership, Haddad was honoured by her alma mater, St. Clair College, with their Alumni of Distinction Award and by UWindsor with an honorary doctor of laws degree.

While serving as president and CEO of The Hospital for Sick Children, Haddad was the recipient of the Order of Canada for her advocacy work for children's health care. In 2011, she was named one of Canada's inaugural Top 25 Women of Influence in health sciences and inducted into the Canada's Most Powerful Women: Top 100 Hall of Fame. She had previously been received Canada's Most Powerful Women: Top 100 Award, presented by the Women's Executive Network in 2007, 2008 and 2009. Haddad stepped down from her position as president and CEO in December 2013 after 10 years in the position.

Upon stepping down from The Hospital for Sick Children, Bob Harding funded the establishment of the Mary Jo Haddad Nursing Chair in Child Health Research at SickKids and her alma mater, UofT. She later joined the Board of Directors of the Kids’Health Links Foundation, an Ontario-based charitable organization. She was founding Chair of Children First Canada, Director of TD Bank Group and Telus. In the same year, Haddad received an honorary Doctor of Laws from the University of Ontario Institute of Technology. In 2019, Haddad became the first female Chancellor at the University of Windsor, replacing Ed Lumley.
