= Diana Patrick =

English novelist (1878–1964)

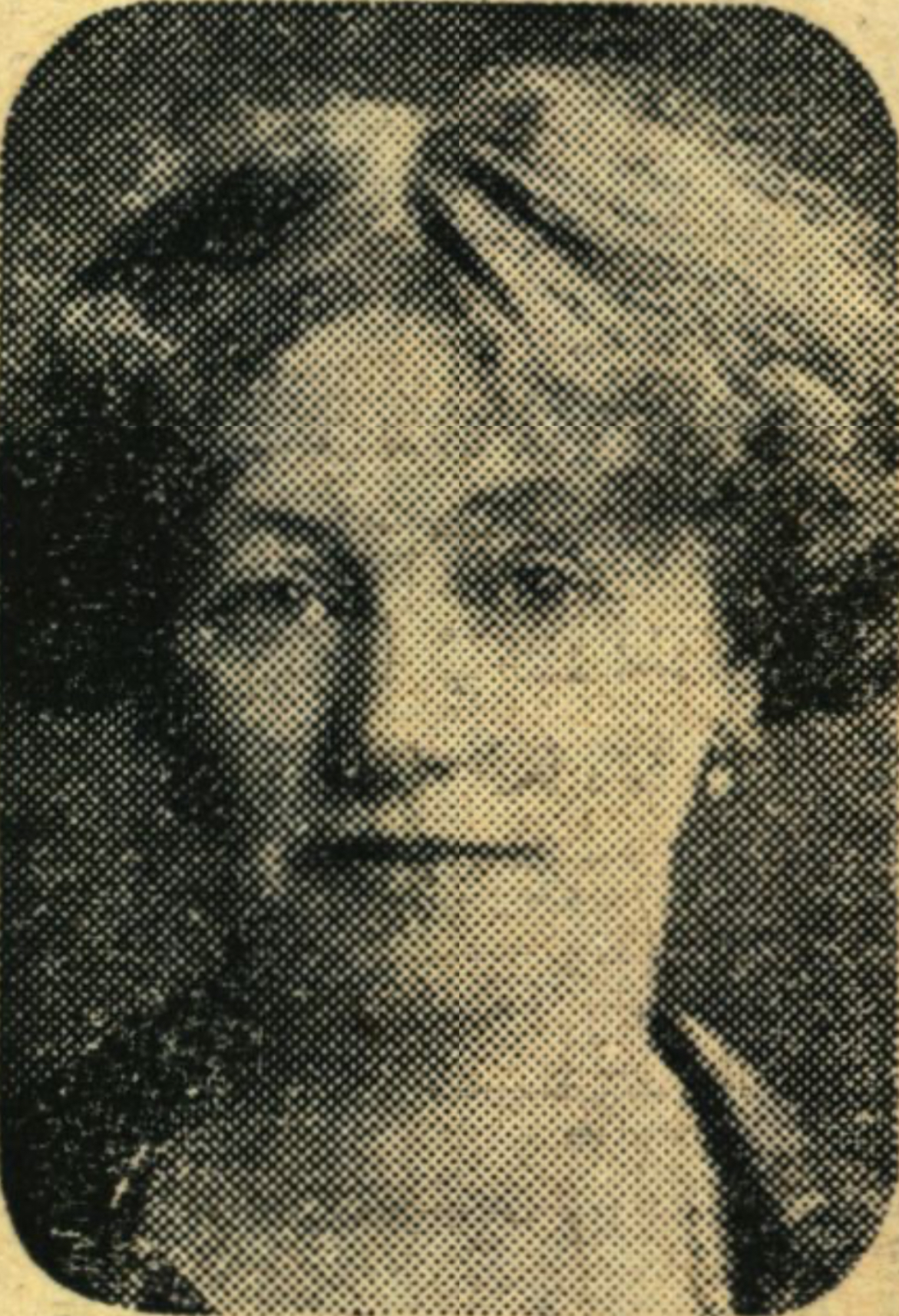
- Daily Mirror (1934)
- Born: Desemea Newman; 20 June 1878; Horton Hall, Bradford, England
- Died: 28 June 1964 (aged 86)
- Other names: Desemea Wilson; Barbara Desmond
- Education: Darlington Training College
- Years active: 1910s–1943
- Spouse: Henry J Wilson (m. 1910)
- Children: 2

Desemea Wilson (née Newman; 20 June 1878 – 16 March 1964), better known by her pseudonym Diana Patrick, was an English novelist and poet. She published over 30 novels from the 1920s to the early 1940s, often with a Yorkshire backdrop. Her writing often covered family drama, class, romance, and contemporary life.

== Early and personal life ==
Desemea Newman was born at Horton Hall, Bradford and grew up in Keighley. Her mother was Isabella. Patrick attended Keighley Girls' Grammar School and studied at Darlington Training College. After completing her training, she was a school mistress at the Keighley Church of England schools on West Lane. As an amateur actress, she was a member of Keighley Thespians and befriended actor Frank Royde.

In 1910, she married Henry J. Wilson, of Irish origin. The couple settled at Woodstock Cottage in Wallingford, Oxfordshire and had two daughters Isabel (1911) and Deirdre (1913). The elder daughter also became an author under the pseudonym Romilly Cavan.

Patrick was a member of the League Against Cruel Sports. She was politically a Liberal.

== Career ==
As Desemea Wilson, she began her career writing poetry in the 1910s. The verse book By Tarn and Thames was published via Erskine Macdonald in 1920. She also wrote a short story that won a Pearson's Magazine prize.

Her primary pseudonym Diana Patrick came from her childhood nickname Di and a family name on her husband's side. She wrote her debut novel The Wider Way in 1918; it was published in 1920 via Hutchinson and described as an "instant success". Hutchinson also secured Patrick a U.S. book deal with E. P. Dutton. Also published was The Islands of Desire.

This was followed by Barbara Justice in 1921, which reportedly sold well in the U.S., and Dusk of Moonrise in 1922. A London review of Dusk of Moonrise noted Patrick had a "steadily increasing public", and that she "has great powers of observation and keen insight into human nature". In 1923, Dreaming Spires, World War I story The Manuscript of Youth and All to Seek were published. Dreaming Spires was dedicated to playwright Henry Wall. Patrick's next novel was Firefly in 1925.

In 1927, Patrick published one novel Gay Girl under the pseudonym Barbara Desmond as well as Call It a Day!, dedicated to actor Frank Royde, and The Rebel Bird. Her next novels were See My Shining Palace!, following the daughter of a self-made man as she navigates the upper class world, and Family Group, a portrait of an industrial family who suddenly inherit a fortune, in 1928 and Gather the Stars, concerning a housewife's ennui, in 1929.

For her 1930 novel Outpost of Arden, a Cotswolds-set drama, Patrick's 17-year old younger daughter Deirdre painted the cover art; the novel was dedicated to Robert Graves. The Sheffield Daily Telegraph suggested Patrick's 1931 novel Heart's Garrison took on a more serious vein than some of her earlier works. Another novel that year was The Time of Gold, a romance between an actress hiding in Cornwall after a scandal and a dramatist.

Patrick's next novels were First Your Penny in 1932 and Vain Pantomime and The Signature of Venus in 1933.

In 1934 came This Our Heritage and Next Year's Rose. A Gloucester Citizen review of Next Year's Rose felt "inclined to challenge" its description as a romance rather than a "penetrative chronicle" of the Chester family, including sisters Daphne, Myrtle and Laurel, from 1910 to 1930. The Montrose Review wrote "Each of the family member's lives are depicted with a wonderful and intimate touch" as they seek happiness amid "war, error, sin, and misfortune".

This was followed by Nineveh House and Smoky Canvas in 1935. The New York Times called Nineveh House "by far the best of Diana Patrick's later novels", delving into the dynamics between the son of a self-made Yorkshire mill owner and the daughter of an Oxford academic. The Derby Daily Telegraph noted "Good novels dealing with the industrial areas of the North are rare", calling Smoky Canvas an "exception". Alice Herbert called it an "extraordinarily human story".

Fragile Armour in 1936 saw "a little more romance" than Smoky Canvas. Set in the moors, a Gloucester Citizen review writes Patrick is "best when dealing with her beloved Yorkshire dales and bringing before us the ruggedness and richness of the character of those who live in the county of broad acres". Her other 1936 novel What Shall We Steer By? was instead set in the Chilterns, starring a Yorkshire-born woman living there.

In 1937 and 1938 respectively, Patrick published the novels Bird of Bright Plumage, So Many Hours, a romance, and Weave a Circle about the restlessness underpinning a comfortable middle class family. J. H. L. Cory of the Southern Times called Weave a Circle Patrick's "best book", while the Irish Weekly and Ulster Examiner wrote it is "worthy of ranking with the writer's earlier successes".

Patrick's daughter Deirdre Castle once again painted the cover art for her 1939 novel World Within These Walls, set in a West Yorkshire village at the turn of the century with a focus on the relationship between two sisters. Patrick's final two novels Life is to Seek and A Little Season were published in 1940 and 1943 respectively.

== Bibliography ==
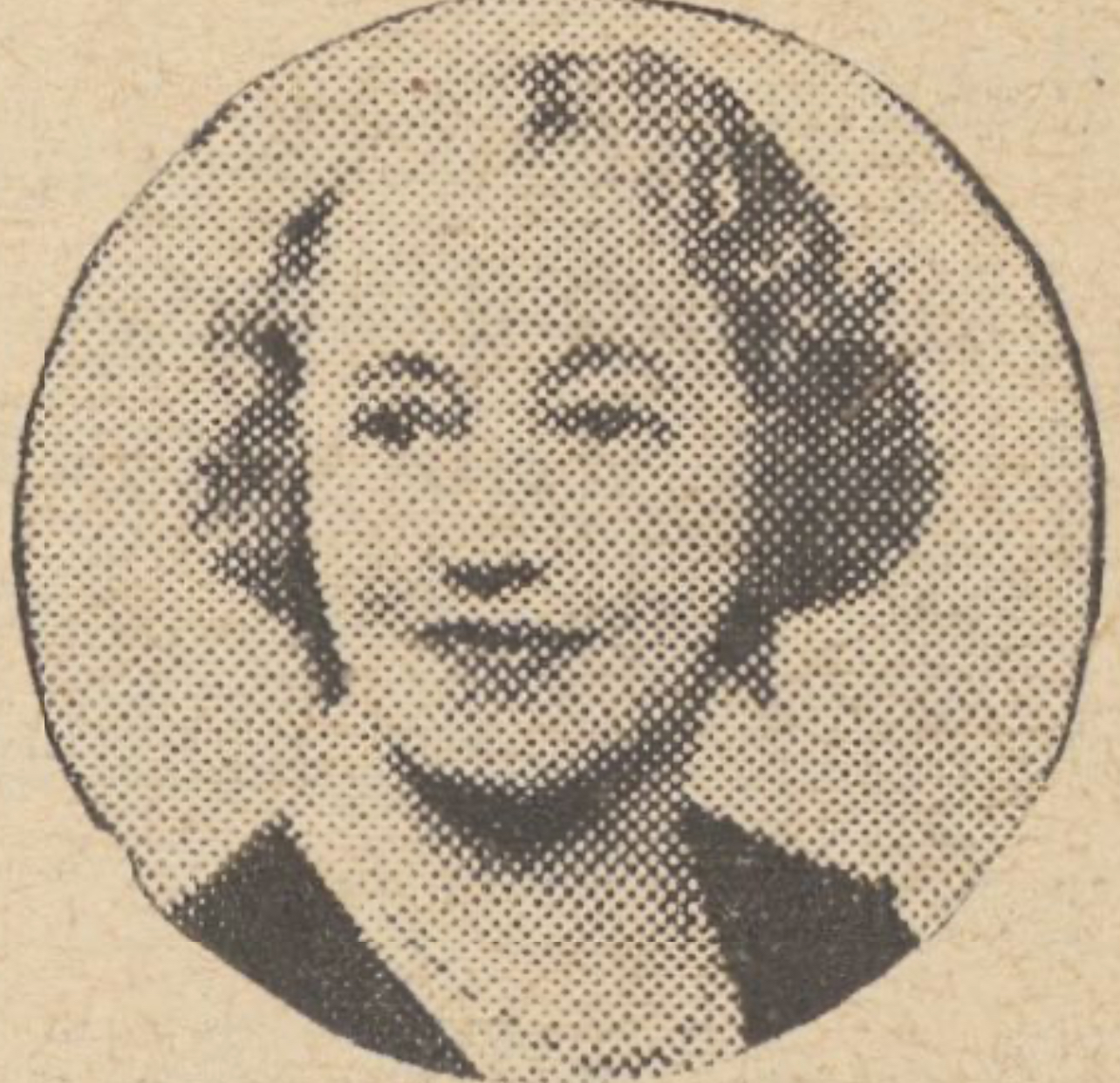
Daily Mirror, 1938

=== Novels ===
- The Wider Way (1920)
- The Islands of Desire (1920)
- Barbara Justice (1921)
- Dusk of Moonrise (1922)
- Dreaming Spires (1923)
- The Manuscript of Youth (1923)
- All to Seek (1923)
- Firefly (1925)
- Call it a Day! (1927)
- Gay Girl (1927) as Barbara Desmond
- The Rebel Bird (1927)
- See My Shining Palace! (1928)
- Family Group (1929)
- Gather the Stars (1929)
- Outpost of Arden (1930)
- Heart's Garrison (1931)
- The Time of Gold (1931)
- First Your Penny (1932)
- The Signature of Venus (1933)
- Vain Pantomime (1933)
- This Our Heritage (1934)
- Next Year's Rose (1934)
- Nineveh House (1935)
- Smoky Canvas (1935)
- Fragile Armour (1936)
- What Shall We Steer By? (1936)
- Bird of Bright Plumage (1937)
- So Many Hours (1938)
- Weave a Circle (1938)
- World Within These Walls (1939)
- Life is to Seek (1940)
- A Little Season (1943)

=== Verse books ===
- By Tarn and Thames (1919) as Desemea Wilson
