= WEtech Alliance =

- Founded: 2011
- Type: Non-Profit Organization, Regional Innovation Center
- Purpose: Assist technology companies in Windsor-Essex / Chatham-Kent
- Headquarters: 2455 Wyandotte Street West, Windsor, Ontario, Canada
- Region served: Windsor-Essex, Chatham-Kent
- Services: Business Advisory, Startup Acceleration
- CEO: Yvonne Pilon
- Website: www.wetech-alliance.com

WE Tech Alliance (stylized as WEtech Alliance or WE•tech Alliance) is a Canadian non-profit Regional Innovation Centre located in Windsor, Ontario servicing the counties of Windsor-Essex and Chatham-Kent.

== Goal ==
WEtech Alliance states that their main goal is "to help grow tech companies of all stages and champion innovation in Windsor-Essex and Chatham-Kent." They do this by providing a variety of different services for startup technology companies, in an effort to build a larger tech sector in the areas serviced. This goal is emphasized by a need for greater economic diversity in the city of Windsor. WEtech, along with other organizations, are working to make technology a key part of Windsors economy going forward.

== History ==
WEtech Alliance was created in 2010, originally founded as the Softech Alliance Network by a group of local entrepreneurs. In February 2011, the Software Alliance Network changed their name to WEtech Alliance and partnered with the Ontario Network of Entrepreneurs (ONE) to become the official Regional Innovation Centre for the Windsor-Essex and Chatham-Kent counties. The organization began based out of the Windsor Downtown Accelerator, a business incubator in Windsor. Here, WEtech offered their services to technology startups based in the facility. In 2017, WEtech moved out of the Windsor Accelerator and relocated to the EPIcentre at the University of Windsor, another startup accelerator focused on aiding students from the University of Windsor. WEtech, however, is still focused on assisting prospect entrepreneurs from all of Windsor-Essex and Chatham-Kent.

== Finances ==
WEtech is funded by external sponsors, who provide both financial funding and non-monetary resources. Their main partners are the Ontario Network of Entrepreneurs and the Ontario Centres of Excellence, through whom they serve as a Regional Innovation Centre. They also receive funding from the University of Windsor as part of the EPICentre, the Government of Ontario through the Ontario Trillium Foundation, and various other local businesses and organizations.
