= Francis Leddy =

Canadian academic (1911–1998)

John Francis Leddy
- Born: April 16, 1911; Ottawa, Ontario
- Died: September 17, 1998 (aged 87)
- Occupation: Academic
- Known for: President of the University of Windsor

John Francis Leddy, OC (April 16, 1911 – September 17, 1998) was a Canadian academic and President of the University of Windsor from 1964 to 1978.

Born in Ottawa, Ontario, he received a B.A. in honours Latin and French from the University of Saskatchewan in 1930 and an M.A. in Latin from the University of Saskatchewan in 1931. After attending the University of Chicago, doing graduate work in Latin and Greek from 1932 to 1933, he was elected a Rhodes Scholar at Oxford University (Exeter College), where he studied Ancient History, graduating Bachelor of Letters (B.Litt.) in 1935 and Doctor of Philosophy (D.Phil.) in 1938.

From 1936 until 1961, he taught Classics at the University of Saskatchewan. In 1946 he became Professor of Classics and Head of the Classics Department. From 1949 to 1964, he was also Dean of the College of Arts and Science, and from 1961 to 1964 Vice President (Academic). In 1964, he was appointed President of the University of Windsor, holding that position until his retirement in 1978. In his honour the University of Windsor library is named the "Leddy Library". He also received many honorary degrees during his lifetime.

Leddy was also instrumental in establishing Canada's version(s) of the Peace Corps. In June 1961 at a Conference at McGill University Leddy along with Louis Perinbam, Keith Spicer, Guy Arnold established the organization Canadian University Service Overseas (CUSO) which sent young volunteers overseas to work on community development projects. Due to his work with CUSO, Leddy was chosen by Prime Minister Lester B Pearson in 1965 to establish the Company of Young Canadians, which was also dubbed as Canada's version of the Peace Corps, even though its volunteers remained at home in Canada to work among disenfranchised communities (urban inner cities, First Nations reserves).

In 1972, he was made an Officer of the Order of Canada, the centrepiece of Canada's honours system which recognizes a lifetime of achievement and merit of a high degree, especially in service to Canada or to humanity at large.

In 1938, he married Kathleen Beatrice White. They had no children.

== Honours ==
- Knight Grand Cross of the Holy Sepulchre
- Bailiff Grand Cross of Obedience - Sovereign Military Order of Malta
- Grand Cross of Merit - Sovereign Military Order of Malta
- Officer of the Order of Canada
- Knight Commander of the Order of St. Gregory
- Gentleman of His Holiness

Academic offices
Preceded by Eugene Carlisle LeBel	President of the University of Windsor; 1964–1978	Succeeded by Mervyn Franklin
