= Eugene Carlisle LeBel =

Canadian academic administrator (1899–1986)

The Reverend Eugene Carlisle LeBel C.S.B., C.D., LL.D
- LeBel in 1958
- Born: July 27, 1899; Sarnia, Ontario, Canada
- Died: August 11, 1986 (aged 87); Toronto, Ontario, Canada
- Occupations: Academic, priest
- Known for: First president of the University of Windsor

Academic background
- Education: University of Toronto (BA); University of Chicago (MA)

Eugene Carlisle LeBel, C.S.B., C.D., LL.D, (July 27, 1899 – August 11, 1986) was a Canadian academic and Catholic priest, who spent much of his life at Catholic universities, both studying and teaching. He is best known for his efforts to introduce academic changes to Assumption College, leading it to become Assumption University of Windsor and later the non-denominational University of Windsor.

== Life ==
LeBel was born in Sarnia, Ontario, in 1899 to Eugene Albert LeBel and Catherine Mahoney.

In 1917 he entered St. Basil's Novitiate in Toronto, Ontario, thus beginning a life of academic involvement. A religious man, LeBel took his first vows on August 10, 1918, and a year later attended the Catholic-run Assumption College (1919–20) in Windsor, Ontario. He then moved back to Toronto where he studied at St. Michael's College for four years (1920–24) and the University of Toronto (1924) where he received his B.A. While at St. Michael's, LeBel was a skilled athlete, named "Captain and Star" of his championship winning football team.

LeBel was Chaplain of the Essex Scottish Regiment in Windsor for fourteen years, including all of World War II.

In 1925, LeBel was ordained a priest and in 1931 he received his M.A. from the University of Chicago. He became a professor of English at the University of Saskatoon (1931–39), and later held the same post at both the University of Toronto (1939–41) and Assumption College (1941–47). Following six years of teaching at Assumption College, LeBel was appointed dean (1947–52), a title he held until Assumption College became Assumption University. During his tenure as Dean of the College, LeBel and his administration pushed for a more open community school of higher learning. After winning affiliation with Essex College and Canterbury College, the Ontario legislature renamed Assumption College to Assumption University of Windsor, making it an official school of the community, though it was still Catholic-oriented. LeBel was named the first President of Assumption University (1952–63). The new university grew rapidly and became dependent on government funding for its survival, becoming the University of Windsor in 1963, which marked the switch from a Catholic university to a public university. LeBel was again named the first President, this time of the University of Windsor. He held the post for one year before retiring in 1964. He was succeeded as president by John Francis Leddy. LeBel died on August 11, 1986.
