= Truro Theological College =

Former Anglican theological college

Truro Theological College (1877–1900) was an Anglican theological college for the Diocese of Truro in Cornwall, England.

The Diocese of Truro was formed in 1876 out of the Diocese of Exeter, and the college was established in 1877. It closed in 1900.

The college was an affiliated college of Durham University. It had an academic hood of a full shape black stuff with the cowl lined for four inches of grey fur and the cape edged with one inch of grey fur. In the 1970s a Truro Ordination Course was established, and this revived the college's hood.
