= Odette School of Business =

Business school in Windsor, Ontario, Canada

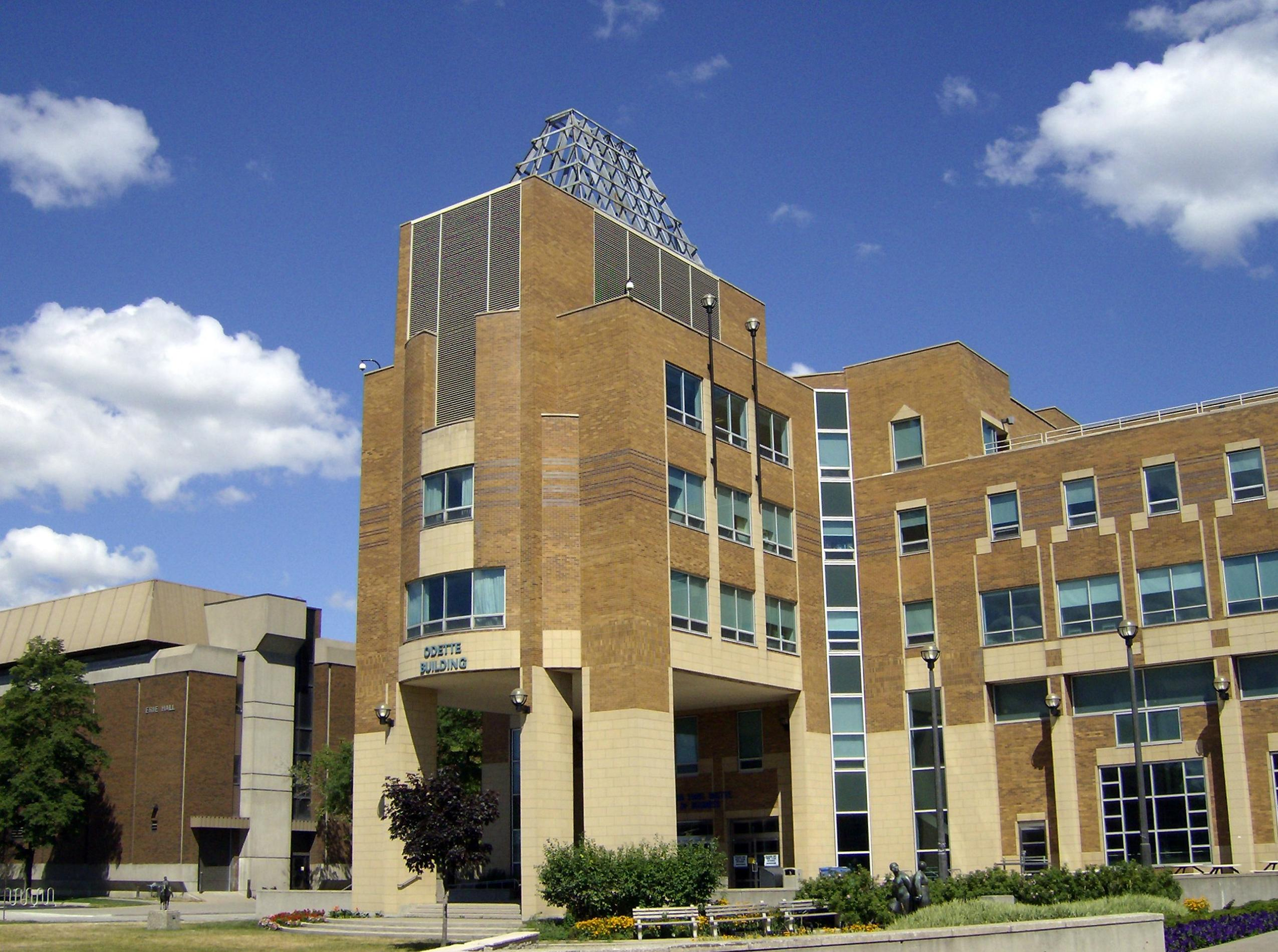
- Faculty of Business, Odette Building.
- Type: Public
- Dean: Dr. Josianne Marsan
- Undergraduates: available
- Postgraduates: available
- Location: Windsor, Ontario, Canada
- Campus: Urban
- Website: www.business.uwindsor.ca

The Odette School of Business (OSB) is the business school of the University of Windsor in Windsor, Ontario. The school offers various programs with focus in Accounting, Human Resources, Finance, Supply Chain and Business Analytics, Marketing, and Strategy and Entrepreneurship. Odette School of Business is accredited by the Association to Advance Collegiate Schools of Business (AACSB).

Applicants to Odette's MBA program do not need to have professional experience, but a Graduate Management Admission Test (GMAT) score of 550 is required.

== History ==
The Odette School of Business traces its beginnings to 1953, when Dr. Gilbert Horne, later to become the first dean of business, established the Department of Business Administration as a distinct unit from the Department of Economics. In 1955, the first graduating class of the three-year Bachelor of Commerce program had degrees conferred upon them; they were a class of sixteen students. The first Honours Bachelor of Commerce class graduated in 1960, followed in 1963 by the first MBA class

In 1964, the Department became the Faculty of Business Administration. Dr. Michael Zin, having graduated from the first graduating class, was named the second dean of the business school in 1973 and in 1978 the Faculty of Business Administration moved into what is now the Education Building at Fanchette Street and Sunset Avenue.

In 1991, the faculty moved into a landmark new Odette Building on the corner of Wyandotte Street West and Sunset Avenue. The Faculty was later renamed the Odette School of Business in 2000, in honour of long-standing supporters Edmond and Louis Odette.

== Notable alumni ==
- Chuck Magro, President and CEO of Nutrien
- Richard Peddie, President and CEO of Maple Leaf Sports & Entertainment
- Sergio Marchionne, CEO of Fiat Chrysler Automobiles
