= Darlington College of Education =

Darlington

Coordinates: 54.5263°N 1.5656°W

Darlington College of Education was a teacher training college which existed for over one hundred years in the town of Darlington, County Durham in northern England.

The college was founded in 1876 by the British and Foreign School Society at Vane Terrace, Darlington. Details of the college's physical expansion, student residences and principals can be found on the website of the Darlington Arts Centre which now occupies its former main building. (See External Link)

For most of its life the college was mainly concerned with the training of nursery school teachers. A period of rapid expansion in the 1960s saw it grow in size to about 450 students by the early 1970s. A general training for infant and junior teachers was offered, as well as three specialist courses in biology, mathematics and physical education for secondary teachers. Academic validation of courses was provided by the University of Durham.

Darlington was one of nearly fifty colleges forced to close down because of an enormous cut-back in planned teacher numbers by central government. David Hencke's book on these events selects Darlington as one of four case studies and explores the political vulnerability of the college.

The final cohort of students left the college in 1978.

== Notable people ==
- Diana Patrick, novelist
