= Canadian Psychology =

- Discipline: Psychology
- Language: English, French
- Edited by: Don Saklofske

Publication details
- Former names: Canadian Psychologist; Canadian Psychological Review
- History: 1950–present
- Publisher: American Psychological Association on behalf of the Canadian Psychological Association
- Frequency: Quarterly
- Impact factor: 2.621 (2021)

Standard abbreviations
- ISO 4: Can. Psychol.

Indexing
- CODEN: CPSGD2
- ISSN: 0708-5591 (print); 1878-7304 (web)
- LCCN: 80648594
- OCLC no.: 301564818

Links
- Journal homepage; Online archive; Journal page at society website

Canadian Psychology (French: Psychologie canadienne) is a quarterly peer-reviewed academic journal published by the American Psychological Association on behalf of the Canadian Psychological Association. The journal was established in 1950 as Canadian Psychologist, later becoming the Canadian Psychological Review in 1975, acquiring its current name in 1980. It and publishes "articles in areas of theory, research, and practice that are potentially of interest to a broad cross-section of psychologists". The editor-in-chief is Don Saklofske (University of Western Ontario).

== Abstracting and indexing ==
The journal is abstracted and indexed in the Social Sciences Citation Index. According to the Journal Citation Reports, the journal has a 2021 impact factor of 2.621.
