= Stefano Bomben =

Canadian electrical engineer

- Education: University of Windsor
- Occupation: Electrical engineer

Stefano Bomben is a Canadian electrical engineer. He was named a fellow of the Institute of Electrical and Electronics Engineers, "for contributions to the development of assessment and repair methods for hydro generator windings".
