= University of Windsor =

Public university in Ontario, Canada

- Coat of arms of the university
- Former names: Assumption College (1857–1956); Assumption University of Windsor (1956–1963)
- Motto: Bonitatem, disciplinam, scientiam (Latin)
- Motto in English: "Goodness, Discipline, and Knowledge"
- Type: Public research university
- Established: September 1857; 169 years ago (Note: This date was when Assumption College was established. The University of Windsor was incorporated on 19 December 1962.)
- Academic affiliations: COU; Universities Canada
- Endowment: CAD$139 million (2023)
- Budget: CAD$345 million (2023)
- Chancellor: Dwight Duncan
- President: J.J McMurtry
- Academic staff: 524
- Students: 17,520 (2022)
- Undergraduates: 11,691 (2022)
- Postgraduates: 5,829 (2022)
- Location: Windsor, Ontario, Canada; 42°18′24″N 83°3′57″W
- Campus: 51 hectares (130 acres); Urban
- Newspaper: The Lance
Colours
Blue and Gold
- Nickname: Lancers
- Sporting affiliations: U Sports - OUA
- Mascot: Winston
- Website: uwindsor.ca

The University of Windsor (UWindsor, U of W, or UWin) is a public research university in Windsor, Ontario, Canada. It is Canada's southernmost university. It has approximately 17,500 students. The university was incorporated by the provincial government in 1962 and has more than 150,000 alumni.

The University of Windsor has nine faculties, including the Faculty of Arts, Humanities and Social Sciences, the Faculty of Education, the Faculty of Engineering, Odette School of Business, the Faculty of Graduate Studies, the Faculty of Human Kinetics, the Faculty of Law, the Faculty of Nursing, and the Faculty of Science. Through its faculties and independent schools, the university has demonstrated its primary research focuses of automotive, environmental, social justice, and international trade research. In recent years, it has increasingly begun focusing on health, natural science, and entrepreneurship research.

== History ==
=== Founding era ===
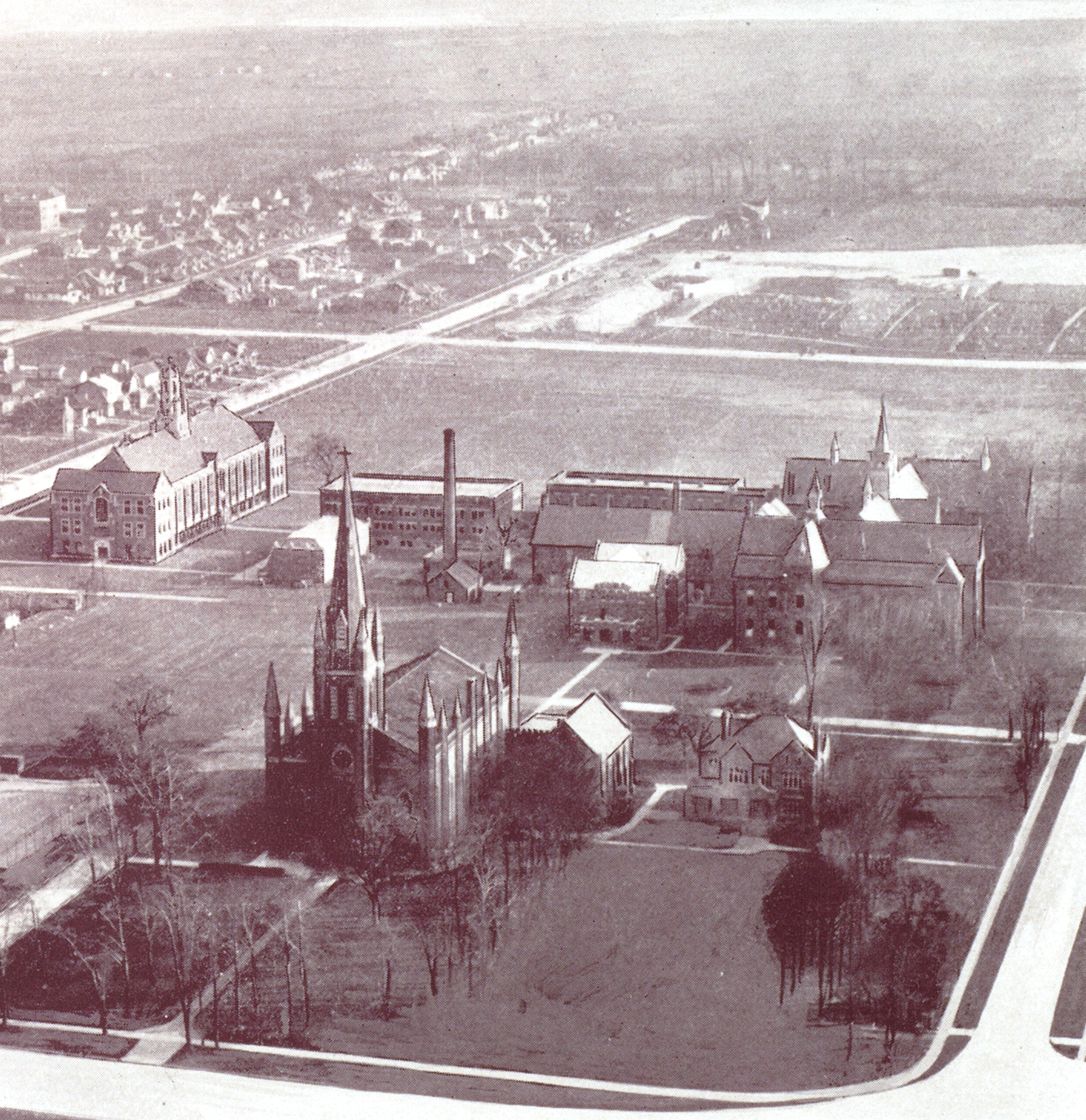
The campus of Assumption College in 1928.

The university dates to the founding of the Roman Catholic Assumption College in Windsor, Ontario, in 1857. Assumption College, a primarily theological institution, was founded by the Society of Jesuits in 1857. The Basilian Fathers assumed control of the college in 1870. The college grew steadily, expanding its curriculum and affiliating with several other colleges over the years.

In 1919, Assumption College affiliated with the University of Western Ontario. This affiliation expanded the curriculum at Assumption, including new general and honours programs for Bachelor of Arts degrees, graduate courses in philosophy, and pre-professional programs in engineering, medicine, and law.

The school became co-educational in 1934 when it formed and admitted women to attend Holy Names College. In 1937, the first class of women graduated from Assumption College, receiving Bachelor of Arts degrees.

Escalating costs forced Assumption College, a Roman Catholic university, to become a public institution to qualify for public support. In 1953, through an Act of the Ontario Legislature, Assumption College received its own university powers, and ended its affiliation with the University of Western Ontario.

In 1956, the institution's name was changed to Assumption University of Windsor, by an Act of the Ontario Legislature, with Reverend Eugene Carlisle LeBel, C.S.B. named as its first President. The recently created Essex College, an independent non-denominational college led by Frank A. DeMarco, became an affiliate, with responsibility for the Faculty of Applied Science; the Schools of Business Administration and Nursing; and the departments of Biology, Chemistry, Geology and Geography, and Mathematics and Physics.

=== Mid-twentieth century ===
In the early 1960s, the city of Windsor's growth and demands for higher education led to further restructuring. A petition was made to the province of Ontario for the creation of a non-denominational University of Windsor by the board of governors and regents of Assumption University and the board of directors of Essex College. The University of Windsor was established as an institution by the University of Windsor Act on December 19, 1962. The transition from an historic Roman Catholic university to a non-denominational provincial university was an unprecedented development.

On July 1, 1963, the entire campus with all of its facilities and faculty became known as the University of Windsor. As a 'federated member', Assumption University remained as an integrated institution, granting degrees only in its Faculty of Theology. Father Eugene Carlisle LeBel from Assumption became the inaugural president of the University of Windsor, and Frank A. DeMarco, who had been holding both positions of Principal, as well as Dean of Applied Science at Essex College, became the inaugural Vice President. The university's coats of arms were designed by heraldic expert Alan Beddoe.

Six months later, Assumption University of Windsor made affiliation agreements with Holy Redeemer College (now Académie Sainte-Cécile), Canterbury College and the new Iona College (affiliated with the United Church of Canada). Canterbury College became the first Anglican college in the world to affiliate with a Roman Catholic University.

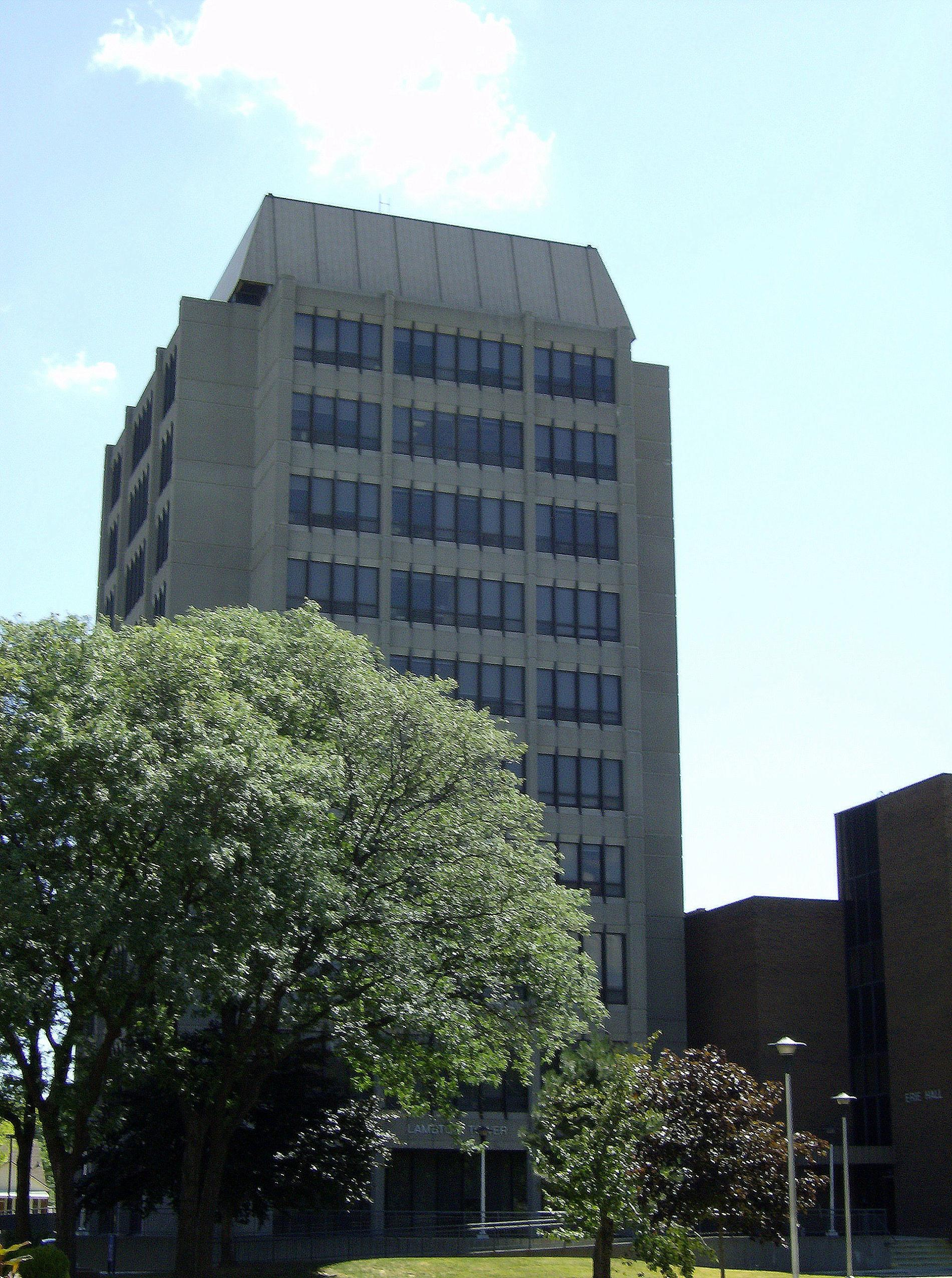
Lambton Tower on campus.

In 1964, when President LeBel retired, John Francis Leddy was appointed president of the University of Windsor, and presided over a period of significant growth.

President Leddy, "concerned that the University of Windsor should emerge as soon as possible from the status and reputation of a College to that of a University", set out to review the existing departments. Based on the strengths in the social sciences, economics, political science and psychology, Leddy proposed to the university's board of governors that a law school be established. In September 1968, the Faculty of Law opened with its first class of students.

From 1967 to 1977, Windsor grew from approximately 1,500 to 8,000 full-time students.

In the 1980s and early 1990s, this growth continued. Among the new buildings erected were the Odette Business Building and the CAW Student Centre.

The university partnered with Chrysler in 1996 to establish the Automotive Research and Development Centre, a research lab that focuses on automotive research and education.

=== Twenty-first century ===
Enrolment reached record heights in 2003 with 16,000 students registered, a 15% increase from the year previous. The increase was driven primarily by first-year students due to the elimination of Grade 13 in Ontario that year. The university developed a number of partnerships with businesses and industry, such as a partnership in 2013 with Maple Leaf Sports and Entertainment, that introduced internships for students and research opportunities.

In 2008, a satellite campus of the Schulich School of Medicine & Dentistry opened at the University of Windsor. The partnership between the University of Windsor and the University of Western Ontario followed several years of community and political organizing, and built upon an existing partnership that started in 2002 that sent Western medical students to Windsor for clinical training. The satellite school initially trained undergraduate medical students in the Doctor of Medicine program and has since expanded to offer post-graduate residency programs in family medicine and psychiatry. As of 2023, the program has added almost 100 physicians to the region.

== Campus ==
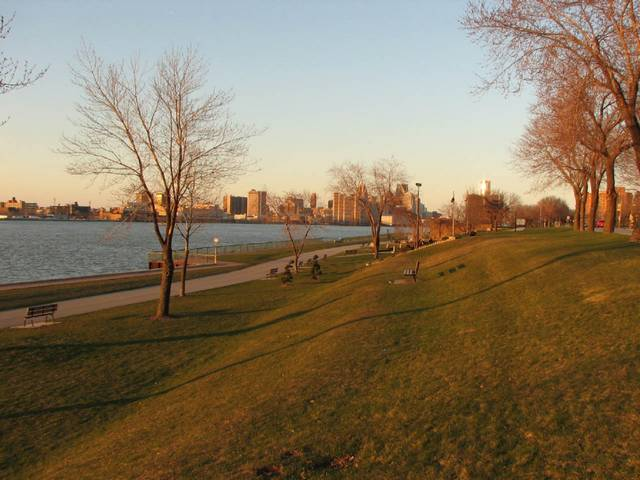
View of the Detroit skyline from the park bordering campus.

Located in Canada's traditional "automotive capital" across the border from Detroit, the campus is near the United States and its busy port of entry to and from the United States. It is framed by the Ambassador Bridge to the west and the Detroit River to the north.

The campus covers 51 hectares (130 acres) (contiguous) and is surrounded by a residential neighborhood. The campus features a small arboretum, which represents most of the species from the Carolinian forest. Campus is approximately a 10-minute drive from downtown Windsor. The university has moved some academic programs to the downtown core, including Social Work, the Executive and Professional Education program, Music and Fine Arts. Due to its historical roots in multiple religious institutions, the university's campus has many examples of Christian architecture in addition to its modern flagship buildings like the $10-million dollar Joyce Entrepreneurship Centre.

The War Memorial Hall (more generally known as Memorial Hall) is a landmark building used as classrooms, labs, and offices. Memorial Hall honours alumni who had enlisted and died in the First World War, and in the Second World War. A bronze tablet remembers the alumni of Assumption College who died in the Second World War.

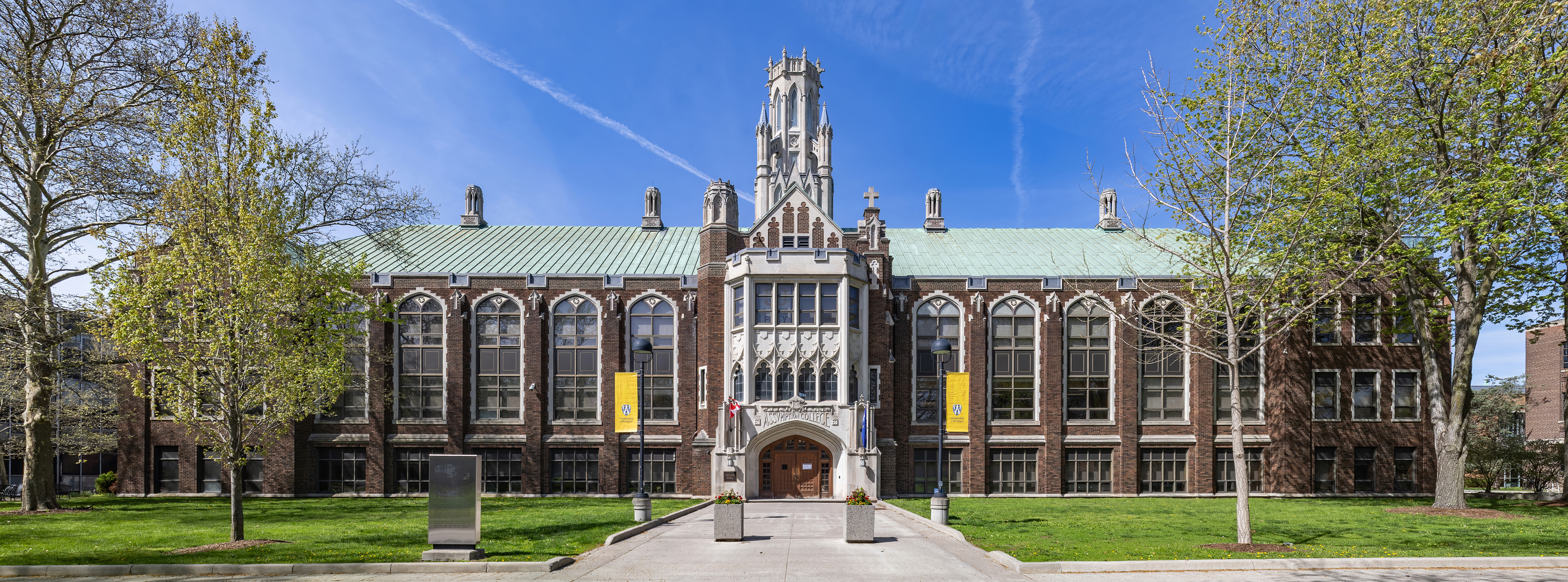
Dillon Hall

The Joyce Entrepreneurship Centre (formerly the “Innovation Centre”) is located on the main campus, on the south side of Wyandotte street. This building houses the EPICentre, and WEtech Alliance. The EPICentre (Entrepreneurship, Practice, and Innovation Centre) is a University of Windsor organization focused on providing students and alumni with the expertise and resources necessary to pursue entrepreneurial goals. The EPICentre is part of the Ontario Centres of Excellence and provides education, mentorship, office space and varying levels of funding to help support startup business. WEtech Alliance is a similar organization, also being an Ontario Centre of Excellence, whose main focus is to support technology startup companies. They provide services to technology startups in the Windsor-Essex and Chatham-Kent regions, not exclusively to students and alumni from the University of Windsor.

The CAW Student Centre is the main, comprehensive centre servicing all student needs. It houses a large food court and the main campus bookstore. Also within the CAW Centre: Student Health Services, a dental office, counselling services, a photographer, a pharmacy, the University of Windsor Students' Alliance (UWSA), a Multi-Faith Space, the campus community radio station CJAM-FM, and an information desk. A large public area beside the food court is available for clubs and informational booths to be set up on certain days. For example, during October there is a period where many Canadian law schools set up booths with representatives who answer questions and provide information to undergraduate students.

The St. Denis Centre, at the south end of campus on College Avenue, is the major athletic and recreational facility for students. It has a weight room, exercise facilities, and a swimming pool. The South Campus Stadium built for the 2005 Pan American Junior Games is beside the St. Denis Centre - which also has dressing rooms for Lancer teams - and borders Huron Church Road, the major avenue to and from the border crossing. The athletics department has become well known for Track & Field, and Men and Women's Basketball.

In February 2018, the university announced plans to build a new athletic centre, titled the Lancer Sport and Recreation Centre. The new facility will cost $73 million and be 130,000-square-feet. Unlike the current St. Denis Centre, there will be many separate sections of the facility to host different athletic resources; such as a new gymnasium, pool, fitness gym and many multi-purpose rooms, as opposed to a single general-purpose space. Construction for the facility began in October, 2018.

In June 2019, a new research facility opened up on the campus. The new facility, called the Essex Centre of Research (or CORe) is built on to the south side of the existing Essex Hall science facility. It is an open concept 46,000-square-feet facility, featuring state-of-the-art labs and will primarily be used as a research facility.

=== Student residences ===
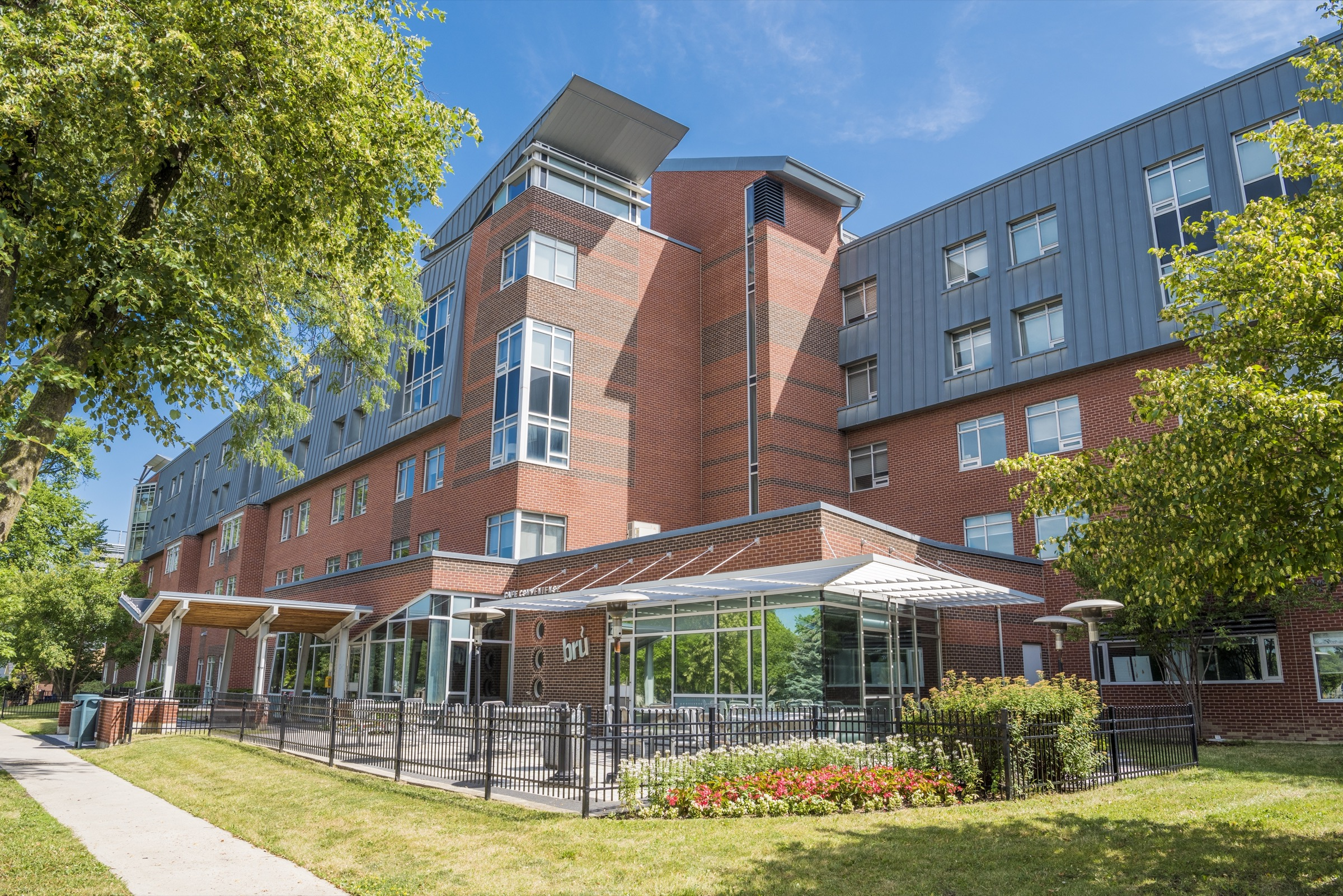
The University of Windsor's Alumni Hall is home to beyond first-year students and offers two-bedroom suites.

The university houses students in four residence halls on campus.

Alumni Hall is home to beyond first-year students. Alumni Hall has all-gender floors and it is a suite-style residence where suites have two bedrooms that share a kitchenette and a three-piece bathroom.

Cartier Hall is home to first-year students. Cartier Hall has all-gender floors, two students share one room and four students share one bathroom.

Laurier Hall is home to beyond first-year students with single rooms on all gender floors. Common/shared all-gender bathrooms.

Rodzik Hall is home to first-year students. Rodzik Hall has all-gender floors, single rooms and two students share one washroom.

== Organization and administration ==
=== Governance ===
The university is governed as a public, non-profit, and non-denominational institution by the University of Windsor Act, 1962, which sets out the basic legal obligations and purposes of the institution. Similar to most Canadian universities, the Act establishes the university as a bicameral institution, governed by a Board of Governors and Senate, and led by a chancellor and president.

The Board is responsible for the oversight of all operational aspects of the university, including strategic direction, budgets, property management, and accountability for the university's financial, human, and physical resources. The Board is also responsible for appointing the chancellor, and the president and vice-chancellor. There are 32 members of the board, 20 external and 12 internal; this size was considered to be large without a compelling reason by the Auditor General of Ontario in a 2022 audit of Ontario universities.

The Senate is the supreme governing body of the university in academic matters. It is responsible for establishing academic policy, approving new programs and curricular changes, setting admission requirements, and overseeing academic regulation and discipline. It is the Senate that grants degrees, and has the authority to revoke them. The Senate is constituted by members of the faculty, who are either appointed ex-officio by virtue of their role, or elected by the faculty members from their home constituencies. Several students, staff members, and an alumni representative are also appointed to the Senate. There are several standing committees of the Senate that oversee different aspects of the Senate's mandate.

As is common in Canada, Windsor is formally headed by the chancellor and led on a day-to-day basis by the president and vice-chancellor. The chancellor is the titular head of the university and confers all degrees. The role is mainly ceremonial. Since May 2019 this has been Mary Jo Haddad, a Windsor nursing alumnus and the first woman to take this role, who succeeded Ed Lumley. The president serves as the chief executive of the university and the chair of the Senate. As per the Act, the president has supervision and direction over the academic work and administration of the university. The current president is Robert Gordon who has been in this role since September 2019.

=== Faculties, schools, and departments ===
The university is organized into nine faculties and schools, which may also be made up of departments. These faculties and schools are led by a dean who is supported by an associate dean. These, along with the department heads and the faculty members, make up each of the faculty's Assembly or Coordinating Council. The university has 524 faculty members.

Faculty of Arts, Humanities, and Social Sciences

- Department of Communication, Media, and Film
- School of Creative Arts
- School of Dramatic Art
- Department of English and Creative Writing
- Department of History
- Department of Languages, Literatures, and Cultures
- Department of Philosophy
- Department of Political Science
- Department of Psychology
- Department of Sociology and Criminology
- School of Social Work

Faculty of Education

Faculty of Engineering

- Department of Civil and Environmental Engineering
- Department of Electrical and Computer Engineering
- Department of Mechanical, Automotive, and Materials Engineering

Faculty of Graduate Studies

Faculty of Human Kinetics

Faculty of Law

Faculty of Nursing

Odette School of Business

Faculty of Science

- Department of Biomedical Sciences
- Department of Chemistry & Biochemistry
- School of Computer Science
- School of the Environment
- Department of Economics
- Department of Integrative Biology
- Department of Mathematics and Statistics
- Department of Physics

=== Federated and affiliated institutions ===
The University of Windsor has three federated or affiliated institutions. It is federated with Assumption University, a Roman Catholic university offering graduate degree programs in religious subjects. The university is affiliated with Canterbury College, a public liberal arts college affiliated with the Anglican Church of Canada, and Iona College, a public liberal arts college formerly affiliated with the United Church of Canada.

=== Finances ===
Windsor has an endowment of $139 million as of April 2023. The university's total assets (including its campus) are valued at $877 million. Its operating budget for the 2023-2024 academic year was $345 million. The Government of Ontario provided 29% of the university's operating revenue, while tuition fees accounted for the bulk of the remainder at 69%. International student tuition fees comprised 62% of all tuition fee revenue.

The growing reliance on tuition fees from international students is not unique to the University of Windsor and is common at Ontario's public universities. A 2023 blue-ribbon panel of experts reviewed the financial sustainability of Ontario's universities and colleges and found that Ontario funds universities at just 57% of the national average, due to the government's policies that reduced direct funding to institutions and cut tuition fees for domestic students.

== Academics ==
The University of Windsor is a public research university and a member of Universities Canada. Full-time undergraduate students comprise the majority of the university's enrolment, with the university offering over than 120 majors and minors. There are more than 70 master's (course and research based) and doctoral degree programs. In 2020, the university conferred more than 2,700 bachelor's degrees, 1,900 master's degrees, and 50 doctoral degrees.

The University of Windsor's philosophy department is known for its work in informal logic, and regularly hosts an international argumentation conference through the Ontario Society for the Study of Argumentation. Students, faculty, and visiting researchers collaborate in the inter-departmental research group the Centre for Research in Reasoning, Argumentation, and Rhetoric. As of 2016, the University of Windsor offers an interdisciplinary PhD in Argumentation Studies, the only graduate program in North America with a focus on this field.

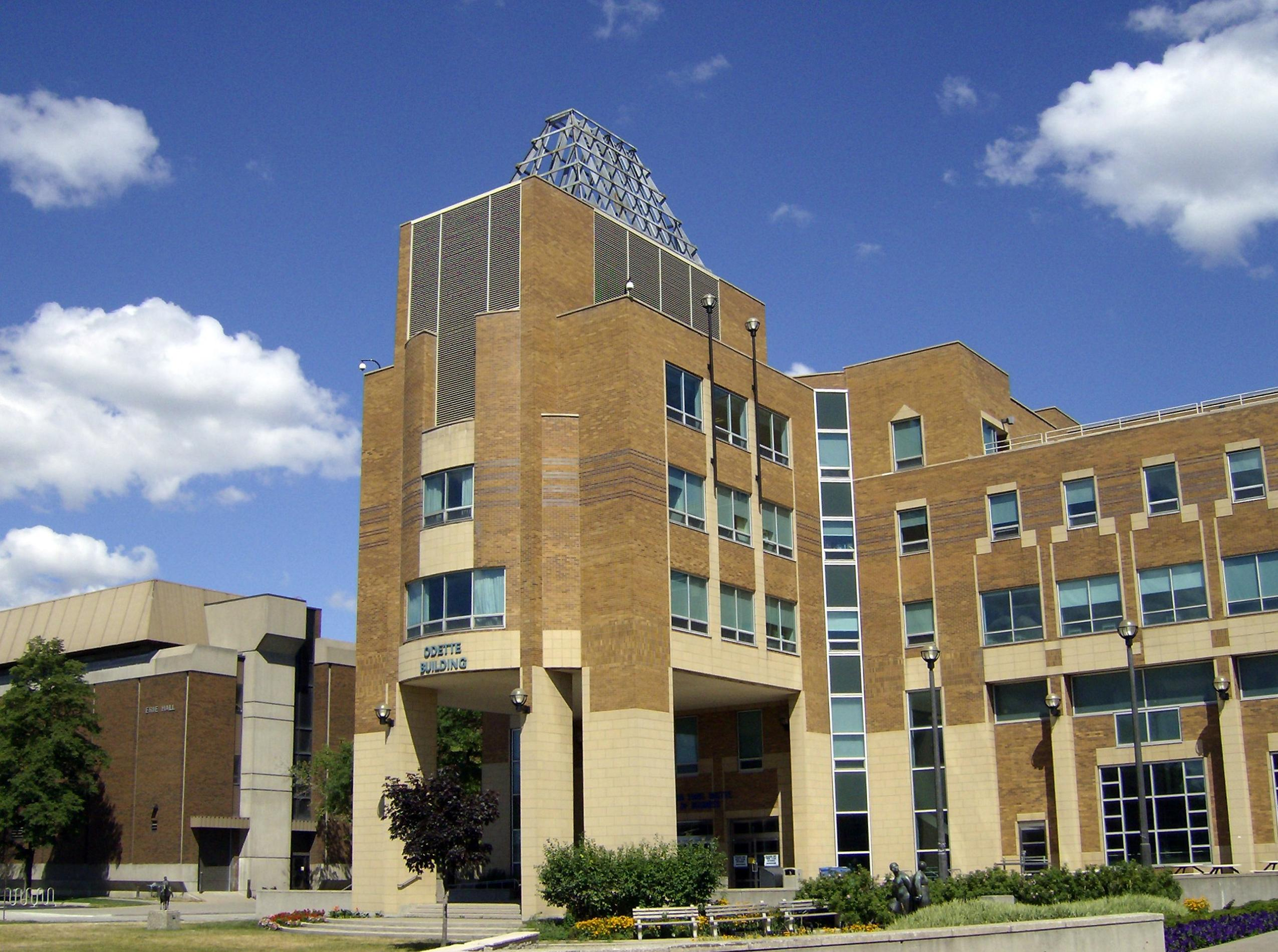
Faculty of Business, Odette Building.

The Faculty of Nursing offers several undergraduate and graduate programs. This includes the accredited clinical Bachelor of Science in Nursing and nurse practitioner programs, along with a research-based doctoral program. The undergraduate program is also offered in collaboration with St. Clair College.

The Faculty of Law, one of seven in Ontario, has a major teaching and research focus on social justice issues and criminal law. Two legal clinics offer training experience for students. The faculty offers a dual undergraduate law program with the University of Detroit Mercy, training students in both Canadian and US law, one of the only programs of this kind in North America.

University of Windsor also provides Inter-Faculty Programs offering cross-departmental majors like Forensics, Environmental studies and Arts & Science concentration. There are nine cooperative education programs for 1,100 students.

=== Reputation and rankings ===
University rankings

World rankings
- QS World: =546
- THE World: 501–600
- USNWR World: 1121

Canadian rankings
- QS National: 20
- THE National: 21–24
- USNWR National: 27
- Maclean's Comprehensive: 14

The University of Windsor has placed in higher-education school rankings. The 2025 QS World University Rankings ranked the university 547 in the world, and 20th in Canada. The 2023 Times Higher Education World University Rankings placed Windsor 501-600 in the world. In the 2022-2023 U.S. News & World Report Best Global Universities Ranking, the university placed 1121 in the world, and 21st in Canada. In terms of national rankings, Maclean's ranked Windsor 14th in their 2024 comprehensive university rankings.

=== Scholarships ===
One of the largest scholarship programs at the institution is the Outstanding Scholars program. It is unique for its interdisciplinary breadth, experiential learning depth an proportionate scale. Secondary students can apply to get a scholarship, mentorship, and leadership curriculum. After students complete their first year, the highest achieving students in each undergraduate faculty are invigted to compete for one of approximately 85 spots in the full Outstanding Scholars program. Full Outstanding Scholars are funded for six paid placements between their second and fourth year of study. What makes the program unique is its scale and the fact that students can become research assistants across any faculty on campus. Students also become part of the UWill Discover ecosystem which includes a journal, podcast and annual conference.

The university joined Project Hero, a scholarship program cofounded by General (Ret'd) Rick Hillier, for the families of fallen Canadian Forces members.

The university established Rosa Schreiber Award with the assistance of former University of Windsor Professor Economics, Alan A. Brown. From the university's Senate Committee on Student Awards: The competition award is open to arts or social science students in Year 2 or beyond. Applicants must submit a 1,500–2,000-word essay on some aspect of moral courage. Submission must be made to the Office of Student Awards. This competition will be held in alternate years. It was established in 1995 to honour Rosa Schreiber, an Austrian freedom fighter who risked her life to help others during World War II.

== Student life ==
International students from nearly 100 countries make up approximately 29% of the student population. Despite the large number of international students, the majority of students are domestic and come from Windsor and Essex County; 12% of full-time students originate from the Greater Toronto Area.

Demographics of student body (2022) (Note: The following includes both full-time, and part-time students.)
	Undergraduate (Note: The following includes students enrolled in first professional degree programs.)	Graduate
Male	44%	61%
Female	56%	39%
Canadian student	93%	27%
International student	7%	73%

Leddy Library is the main campus library. The Paul Martin Law Library serves the Faculty of Law. The Canadian Auto Workers Union helped to build the CAW Student Centre which is a central meeting place for students. The university has a unique agreement with the Ambassador Duty-Free Store at Canada's busiest border crossing which provides student jobs, 400 parking spaces, and an annual cash annuity to the school.

Toldo Lancer Centre is the newest addition to the University of Windsor. It provides many different kinds of recreational services for students including free access to the Fitness Centre to workout, opened every day. Students can also enjoy their access to the Dennis Fairall Fieldhouse and state of the art additions including Lancer Commons, Pool, Triple Gymnasium and Multipurpose Rooms. The Toldo Lancer Centre officially opened to students on July 4, 2022.

=== Student unions ===
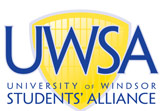
University of Windsor Students' Alliance logo

There are three student unions at Windsor. The University of Windsor Students' Alliance, otherwise known as the UWSA, represents all full-time undergraduate students at the University of Windsor, located in Windsor, Ontario, Canada. It provides services such as an Office of Student Empowerment, financial awards, a food pantry, representation on various University of Windsor bodies, a weekly student newspaper, The Lance, and various other services and programs.

The Organization of Part-time University Students (OPUS) represents part-time undergraduate students, while the Graduate Student Society represents all graduate students at the university. All three student unions are affiliated with the Canadian Federation of Students.

=== Athletics ===
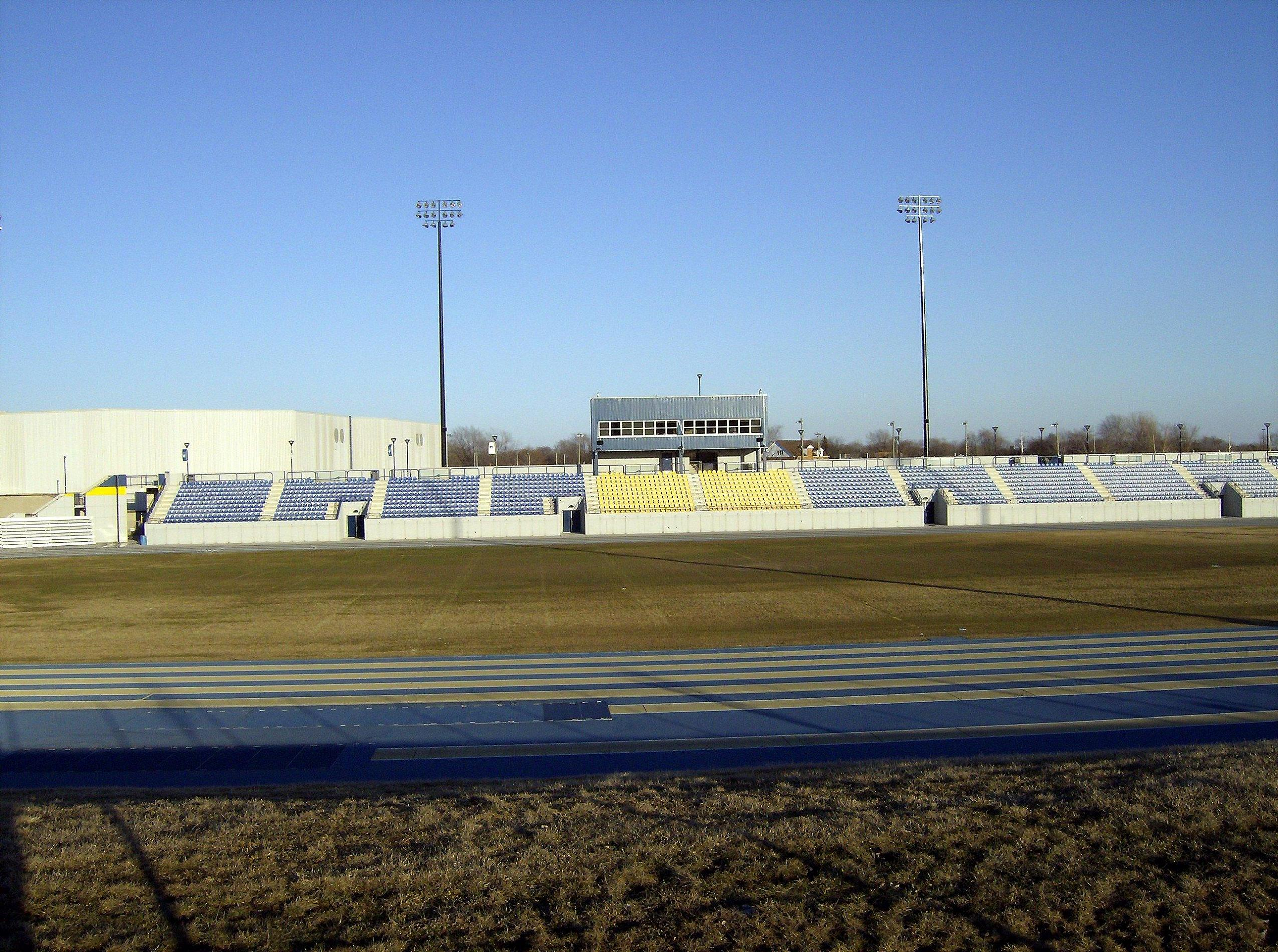
South Campus Stadium stands.

The University is represented in U Sports by the Windsor Lancers. The Lancers play within the Ontario University Athletics conference. The University of Windsor Stadium plays host to a variety of intercollegiate sports including:

- Football
- Soccer
- Outdoor track and field
- Basketball
- Volleyball
- Curling
- Ball Hockey
- European Handball
- Flag Football
- Table Tennis
- Indoor Rugby
- Windsor Lancers Ice Hockey team plays at the South Windsor Arena.

== Notable people ==
=== Alumni ===
- Lorne Abony, businessman
- Navdeep Bains, Liberal MP for Mississauga—Malton, and Minister of Innovation, Science and Economic Development
- Melissa Bishop-Nriagu, Canadian Olympian
- Stefano Bomben, electrical engineer
- James Bondy, entertainer, co-star of Ribert and Robert's Wonderworld
- Joe Bowen, sportscaster, "The Voice of the Toronto Maple Leafs"
- Patrick Brown, former Leader of the Opposition in Ontario and Mayor of Brampton
- Warren Christie, actor
- Antoni Cimolino, general director of the Stratford Festival
- Joe Comuzzi, former Member of Parliament and cabinet minister
- Nicole Corriero, all-time collegiate hockey record holder for most goals in a season (59 goals, tied with Mike Donnelly)
- Murray Costello, retired NHL player, president of Hockey Canada, inducted into Hockey Hall of Fame, the IIHF Hall of Fame, Canada's Sports Hall of Fame, and is an Officer of the Order of Canada, and a recipient of the Order of Hockey in Canada.
- Pete DeBoer, NHL coach, New York Islanders, Dallas Stars, Vegas Golden Knights, San Jose Sharks, New Jersey Devils and Florida Panthers
- Dean Del Mastro, former Member of Parliament
- Drew Dilkens, mayor of Windsor, Ontario
- Dwight Duncan, former Member of Provincial Parliament and former Minister of Finance
- Colm Feore, actor
- Eddie Francis, former mayor of Windsor, Ontario
- Arjei Franklin, receiver, Winnipeg Blue Bombers, CFL
- Douglas Fregin, co-founder of BlackBerry Limited
- Stewart Friesen, Racecar driver, NASCAR.
- Roger Gallaway, former Member of Parliament
- Kevin Hanchard, actor
- Mark Hominick, UFC fighter
- Marie Howe, poet
- Dario Hunter, the first Muslim-born person to be ordained a rabbi.
- Maureen Jennings, novelist
- Ronalda Jones, writer and actress
- Akshay Kumar, Bollywood actor
- Thomas LaSorda, CEO of Chrysler Group
- Joseph Lau, Hong Kong billionaire businessman
- Hilary M. Lips, Emerita professor and research faculty in Psychology at Radford University
- Frank Mahovlich, NHL Hall-of-Famer and Canadian Senator
- Stephen Mandel, Alberta Minister of Health and former mayor of Edmonton, Alberta
- Dylan Mandlsohn, stand-up comedian
- Sergio Marchionne, CEO of Fiat Chrysler Automobiles, chairman of CNH Industrial and CEO of Ferrari
- Joe Mimran, Canadian fashion designer and entrepreneur, launched the Club Monaco and Joe Fresh brands
- Thomas Moore, author
- Hodan Nalayeh, media executive and entrepreneur
- Rick Nicholls, Member of Provincial Parliament for Chatham-Kent—Leamington, Ontario
- Rob Nicholson, Minister of National Defence of Canada
- Richard Peddie, former president and CEO of Maple Leaf Sports & Entertainment
- Joel Quenneville, former coach of the Chicago Blackhawks of the NHL
- Carlos Queiroz, professional soccer manager
- John Redmond C.S.B., Basilian priest, teacher, principal, athletic director and coach at Michael Power/St. Joseph High School.
- Michael Rotenberg, film and television producer
- Lynsay Sands, author
- Douglas Stenton OC, archaeologist, former Director of Heritage for the Nunavut Department of Culture and Heritage
- Amanda Tapping, actor
- Anna Maria Tremonti, CBC Radio and CBC Television reporter
- Daniel Victor, musician and founder of Neverending White Lights
- Tessa Virtue, professional ice dancer, most decorated figure skater in Olympic history
- Bob Weeks, TSN golf analyst, member of Canadian Golf Hall of Fame and Canadian Curling Hall of Fame
- Nigel Shawn Williams, actor
- Anna Mae Wills, actress
- Alexander Zonjic, professional flutist
- Stanley E. Zin, William R. Berkley Professor of Economics and Business, New York University, and Frisch Medal winner

=== Faculty ===
- Iain Baxter&, Professor Emeritus School of Visual Arts, award-winning Canadian photographer, painter, sculptor, installation artist, and conceptual artist
- Di Brandt, former Professor and poet
- Alan A. Brown, Professor of Economics, founder of Omicron Delta Epsilon (ODE), international honor society in Economics
- Tricia Carmichael, Professor of Chemistry
- John N. Deck, former professor, Plotinus Scholar
- Craig Fleisher, Professor of Management and Windsor Research Leadership Chair, Odette School of Business, author of several key books on business and competitive intelligence
- Alistair MacLeod, Author, Arts Faculty Professor, and award-winning Canadian author
- Howard McCurdy, former professor, scientist, department head, first black tenured professor in Canada, politician, and scholar
- Marshall McLuhan, former professor, Canadian educator, philosopher, and scholar
- Eugene McNamara, Professor Emeritus of English, writer, and poet, initiated the Creative Writing Program which has graduated a number of award-winning authors, former editor of the Windsor Review
- Lakshman Marasinghe, Professor Emeritus of Law, Chairman of the Law Commission of Sri Lanka
- André Narbonne, professor of English and writer
- Joyce Carol Oates, former visiting English Department Faculty member from 1968 to 1978 now at Princeton University, American Author
- Howard Pawley (retired), former NDP Premier of Manitoba (1981–1988)
- Ralph Simmonds, judge on the Supreme Court of Western Australia, once a professor of law at University of Windsor
- Vern Stenlund, Professor of Education, Coach men's hockey, former NHL player and co-author of hockey books with Bobby Orr

=== Presidents ===
1. Eugene Carlisle LeBel, 1963–1964
2. John Francis Leddy, 1964–1978
3. Mervyn Franklin, 1978–1984
4. Ronald W. Ianni, 1984–1997
5. Gordon W. Wood, 1997-1998 (Acting)
6. Ross H. Paul, 1998–2008
7. Alan Wildeman, 2008–2018
8. Douglas Kneale, 2018-2019 (interim)
9. Robert Gordon, 2019–2025
10. J.J. McMurtry, 2025–present

=== Chancellors ===
1. Keiller Mackay, 1964–1970
2. Lucien Lamoureu, 1971–1977
3. Richard Rohmer. 1978–1989
4. William Somerville, 1989–1993
5. Charles Clark, 1993–1996
6. Richard Rohmer, 1996–1997
7. Frederic Jackma, 1997–2006
8. Edward Lumley, 2006–2019
9. Mary Jo Haddad, 2019–2025
10. Dwight Duncan, 2025–present

=== Others ===
Jennifer E. Jones was the university's chair of governors and she went on to be the first woman to lead Rotary International in 2022.

== See also ==
- Canadian Centre for Alternatives to Animal Methods
- Higher education in Ontario
- List of universities in Ontario
