= Iona College (Windsor, Ontario) =

Affiliated college of the University of Windsor in Canada

- Type: Affiliated college
- Established: 1964
- Affiliations: University of Windsor
- Religious affiliation: Interfaith
- Location: 401 Sunset Avenue; Windsor, Ontario; N9B 3A7
- Campus: Urban
- Website: uwindsor.ca/ionacollege/

Iona College is a small affiliated college of the University of Windsor located in Windsor, Ontario, Canada. Initially founded by the United Church of Canada, in 2016 the college announced it would become an interfaith college with a board of directors representing a variety of religious groups.

== History ==
=== Founding ===
In December 1963, prior to its formation, Iona was included alongside Canterbury College and Assumption University in an affiliation agreement with the University of Windsor.

Iona College was officially opened in 1964 by the United Church of Canada. It was named after the island of Iona in Scotland.

The college's original campus consisted of a single house located at 208 Sunset Avenue on the campus of the University of Windsor. The building was formerly the home of Bruce J. S. MacDonald, who prosecuted war crimes charges against SS general Kurt Meyer as part of the Canadian War Crimes Commission and later served as a Crown attorney and judge in Windsor.

=== Building demolition ===
The college sold the building to the University of Windsor in July 2016 due to Iona College's rising debt and the poor condition of the building. The contents of the building were sold off in October 2016.

The university was permitted to begin demolition after significant community debate over whether the house should be designated a heritage building. It was demolished in May 2018 with the university announcing that the land would be developed into a public park.

In 2024, the college owned no property and had only $5,000 in assets with over $44,000 of liabilites.

In 2026, Iona College is offering a course on pastoral care on the campus of nearby Canterbury College. It also offers approximately $4,000 in scholarships each year to undergraduate students.
