= Assumption University (Windsor, Ontario) =

Catholic university in Windsor, Ontario, Canada

- Latin: Universitas Assumptionis
- Former names: Assumption College (1857-1920); Assumption College of the University of Western Ontario (1920-1953); Assumption University of Windsor (1956-1964)
- Motto: Bonitatem et Disciplinam et Scientiam Doce Me (Latin)
- Motto in English: Teach Me Goodness, Discipline and Knowledge
- Type: Public
- Established: 1857; 169 years ago
- Founder: Society of Jesus
- Affiliations: University of Windsor, Canterbury College, Iona College
- Religious affiliation: Roman Catholic (Basilian Fathers)
- Academic affiliations: Association of Catholic Colleges and Universities in Canada
- Chancellor: TBA
- President: Dr. John F. Cappucci
- Location: 400 Huron Church Rd., Windsor, Ontario, Canada
- Campus: Urban
- Colours: Blue and gold
- Website: www.assumptionu.ca

Assumption University is a Roman Catholic university in Windsor, Ontario, federated with the University of Windsor. It was founded in 1857 as Assumption College by the Society of Jesus and incorporated by an Act of the Parliament of Upper Canada, receiving Royal Assent, August 16, 1858. It entered an association with an Ontario university as the Assumption College of the University of Western Ontario (1920–1953) then became the Assumption University of Windsor in 1956, before changing its name again in 1964. When the University of Windsor was established as a secular public university in 1963, Assumption University entered into federation with the newly formed university. Assumption University also remains affiliated with Canterbury College (Anglican) and Iona College (Interfaith). Assumption University is a member of the Association of Catholic Colleges and Universities in Canada (ACCUC) and Association of Catholic Colleges and Universities.

Assumption University currently offers courses at both the undergraduate and graduate levels. In 2022, Assumption University established a Graduate Diploma in Catholic Studies attracting both Canadian and international students. Assumption University also offers undergraduate courses in partnership with the University of Windsor.

Assumption University has its own governance structure with a bicameral system consisting of a Board of Governors and a Senate. While it operates autonomously, Assumption is federated with the University of Windsor. Assumption University has representatives on the University of Windsor's Board of Governors, Senate, and Alumni Board of Directors. It retains its degree-granting powers for graduate studies within the area of theology as well as granting honorary degrees.

Assumption has the distinction of originating the national championship trophy in men's college basketball. In 1963, the University of Windsor Alumni Association donated the award featuring a silver basketball, and named in memory of W.P. McGee for his outstanding contribution as both teacher and coach during the 1920s and 1930s. Assumption won the first McGee trophy, the only time it took the national title under the Assumption name. The University of Windsor would win it four times in that same decade (1960s). For more than 60 years, the McGee trophy has been awarded annually to the U Sports men's basketball champion.

As a Roman Catholic University, the Chancellor of Assumption University is typically the Bishop of London. Bishop Ronald Peter Fabbro is Chancellor Emeritus of Assumption University. Dr. John F. Cappucci is the President and Vice-Chancellor - the first layperson to hold the presidency since the institution's founding in 1857. Previous to this appointment, Dr. Cappucci served as Principal and Vice-Chancellor from 2020-2024 and Interim Principal from 2019 to 2020. One of Assumption University's most recognized programs is the Christian Culture Series. Since 1941, the Christian Culture Series Gold Medal has been presented to a prominent individual who exemplifies Christian ideals in their daily lives. In 2021, Assumption University marked the 80th anniversary of the Christian Culture Series Gold Medal. The year's recipient was Super Bowl XLVIII champion Luke Willson. Assumption University currently has an active campus ministry program that serves the students at the University of Windsor. Assumption University is home to the Stephen Jarislowsky Chair in Religion and Conflict. In 2022, after nearly thirty years, a Red Mass was finally celebrated in Windsor thanks to the collective work of Assumption University and the Red Mass Society of Windsor. At the Red Mass, the retiring Chief Justice of the Michigan Supreme Court, Bridget Mary McCormack received the inaugural St. Thomas More Gold Medal for outstanding service to the legal profession.

== History ==
Its history dates back to the founding of Assumption College in 1857 by the Society of Jesus (Jesuit) following the growth of their parish at Our Lady of the Assumption established in 1728. Assumption University has been administered by the Congregation of St. Basil since 1870.

In 1919, Assumption College in Windsor affiliated with the University of Western Ontario. Originally, Assumption was one of the largest colleges associated with the University of Western Ontario. In 1934, Holy Names College affiliated with Assumption College and in 1940, a labour school was established at Assumption.

In 1950, Assumption College welcomed its first women students and in 1953, it ended its affiliation with the University of Western Ontario and became an independent institution through an act of the Legislative Assembly of Ontario.

On January 1, 1956, the college changed its name to Assumption University of Windsor and on January 24, 1956, accepted as an affiliate of the non-denominational Essex College, the latter established in July 1954 "as an independent college…to provide access to provincial grants." Holy Names College affiliated in 1956 and Holy Redeemer College in 1957. On November 4, 1957, Canterbury College became the first Anglican college in the world to affiliate with a Roman Catholic University.

In December 1963, Assumption University, Canterbury College, Holy Redeemer College (now Académie Sainte-Cécile), and the Iona College (United Church Affiliate), and the University of Windsor joined in an affiliation agreement. "When the University of Windsor began operations on July 1, 1963" ..." Essex College ceased to exist as a corporate entity and its assets were taken over by the University of Windsor." Assumption College in Windsor had incubated and ushered into existence both Assumption University and now, the University of Windsor.

In 2022, as part of its academic revitalization plan, Assumption University restored its Senate rendering the university a bicameral institution. With the Senate in place, Assumption University began to offer courses at both the undergraduate and graduate levels.

== Undergraduate Courses ==
In March 2022, Assumption University restored its Senate, which provides oversight over all academic matters.During the Spring 2022 semester, Assumption launched a new undergraduate course entitled, Jerusalem and Rome: Jewish-Catholic Relations. In the Fall 2022 semester, a course on the Holocaust was offered. The course invited guest speakers, including a Holocaust survivor. In 2022, Assumption University became the second Canadian institute of higher learning to become a member of the Council of Centers on Jewish-Christian Relations. In 2026, Assumption University and the University of Windsor signed a Memorandum of Agreement whereby both federated institutes would co-teach undergraduate courses. These courses would include topics on AI and Ethics, Science and Religion, the Abrahamic Faiths, and the Holocaust.

== Graduate Courses ==
In the fall of 2022, Assumption University launched a new Graduate Diploma in Catholic Studies. The five-course diploma is taught synchronously online by qualified professors. It received the endorsement of the Bishop of London and Chancellor of Assumption University, Ronald Peter Fabbro. The courses include, Foundations of Catholic Thought, Catholicism and Social Justice, Catholicism and Dialogue, Topics in Catholic Studies, Catholic Studies Capstone Project, and Directed Readings in Catholic Studies. This diploma is advantageous to students seeking employment in the Catholic education, healthcare, or social services sectors. The diploma is considered a hiring asset at several Catholic school boards in the province of Ontario. In addition, given the program's flexibility, it fits within the busy schedules of working professionals, particularly teachers, healthcare professionals, and administrators in search of an added graduate credential for possible career advancement. There are several scholarships attached to the diploma, including the Honourable Robert Joseph Comuzzi Scholarship, the Cappucci Scholarship in Christian Studies, the Minotti Scholarship in Christian Studies, the Monsignor L.A. Wnuk Scholarship, and the William E. Kelly Scholarship in Catholic Studies. In 2023, Dr. Daniel Andreae provided a donation of $30,000 to support courses and scholarships in Jewish-Christian dialogue and dialogue studies. A new scholarship was endowed by the Polonia Centre of Windsor in 2023 to support students studying in the graduate program. On June 29, 2024, Assumption University graduated its inaugural class from the Graduate Diploma in Catholic Studies program. At the convocation, honorary doctorates were presented to John Beck and Veronique Mandal. The LeBel Award was presented to Dr. Dan Andreae for his years of service to Assumption University and the Windsor-Essex community. In addition, for what is believed as the first time in Assumption's history, the Governor General of Canada's Gold Academic Medal was presented to the top graduating student.

== Campus Ministry ==
Assumption University provides Campus Ministry services to the University of Windsor students, faculty and staff. Their program includes Sunday and weekday Masses and places emphasis on student leadership. Campus Ministry's services engage the population of the University of Windsor by creating spaces and programs that promote self-betterment and hospitality. They are open to all participants.

== Stephen Jarislowsky Chair in Religion and Conflict ==
The Stephen Jarislowsky Chair in Religion and Conflict was established in 2004 with a generous donation from the Stephen Jarislowsky Foundation and the Basilian Fathers of Sandwich. Chair holds have included:

1. Fr. Paul Rennick, CSB (2004)
2. Fr. Mario D'Souza, CSB (2005)
3. Dr. Martha Lee (2005–2010)
4. Dr. Norman King (2010–2017)
5. Dr. John Cappucci (2017–present)

In addition to an active research agenda, the chair is involved in the community providing classes on topics such as the Abrahamic faiths, women and religion, religion and politics, and Catholic-Jewish relations. Each year, the chair invites guest speakers from a variety of religious and spiritual backgrounds to speak about a topic of relevance in the contemporary world. The chair's past speakers have included John Esposito, Andrew Bennett, and Murray Sinclair. In 2019, the chair established the Fr. Paul McGill, CSB Essay Contest for graduating high schools students in the region. In 2021, Dr. Rory Dickson of the University of Winnipeg presented a talk on Sufism. In 2022, the chair partnered with Sandwich First Baptist Church and several other community partners to welcome Dr. Terrence Johnson from Harvard Divinity School.

== Red Mass ==
Like several Roman Catholic institutes of higher learning and organizations, Assumption University hosts an annual Red Mass at the beginning of the legal and academic year. The Red Mass is ecumenical and interfaith in nature welcoming individuals from all traditions and beliefs. In 2022, Assumption University along with the Red Mass Society of Windsor hosted the city's first Red Mass in nearly thirty years. At the Red Mass, Assumption University presents the St. Thomas More Gold Medal to a legal professional who has made outstanding contributions to the legal profession. Past recipients have included now Retired Chief Justice Bridget Mary McCormack of the Michigan Supreme Court, Chief Justice Michael Tulloch of the Ontario Court of Appeals, Windsor lawyer, Greg Monforton, and Windsor's Poet Laureate, Peter Hrastovec.

== Fr. Joseph Quinn, CSB Seminar Series in Social Justice ==
In 2019, the Fr. Joseph Quinn, CSB Seminar Series in Social Justice was relaunched. This series is named in honour of the late Fr. Joseph Quinn, CSB (1933–2019) who served as Interim President of Assumption University and dedicated his priestly ministry to social justice causes. In the past, this event has historically brought students together to learn about a social justice issue, such as the Holocaust, human trafficking, and the Underground Railroad. In 2020, the topic was the environment with a theme of "the power of one." The event was formally relaunched on April 22, 2021, with environmentalist Simon Jackson of Spirit Bear: The Simon Jackson Story as the keynote speaker. The event attracted over 1,600 students and teachers from across Windsor and Essex County. The 2021 event marked a record-level number of students for the series. In 2022, the series continued with a topic on homelessness in Windsor-Essex and beyond. The session included individuals working to alleviate homelessness in various ways. The 2023 series took place on April 20, 2023, and focused on the Underground Railroad. The series was hosted at the historic Sandwich First Baptist Church in Windsor. The 2024 series took place at Walkerville Collegiate Institute with students joining from several area schools. The year's topic was on Food security, which included a panel of diverse speakers.

== Fr. Eugene Carlisle LeBel, CSB Award ==
The LeBel Award is considered one of Assumption University's most prestigious awards. The award is named in honour of Fr. Eugene Carlisle LeBel, CSB (1899–1986) who served as the last president of Assumption College, first president of Assumption University in 1952, and the first president of the new University of Windsor in 1963. The award is conferred on individuals who have rendered outstanding service to Assumption University. The selection of recipients is at the sole discretion of the principal. The award is not necessarily awarded annually. The last recipient of the LeBel Award was Dr. Carl Cohen, Q.C. in 2022 on the occasion of Assumption University's 165th anniversary. In 2024, Dr. Dan Andreae received the LeBel Award in honour of his years of dedication to Assumption University.

== Christian Culture Series ==
The Christian Culture Series was founded in 1934 by Fr. Stanley Murphy, CSB with the purpose of highlighting the role culture plays in contemporary Christian life. The series welcomed prominent speakers from a host of backgrounds and perspectives. In 1941, the Christian Culture Series Gold Medal was established from this program and presented to an individual who exemplifies Christian ideals in his or her daily life. Since its founding in 1941, the gold medal has been conferred upon novelists, poets, historians, academics, politicians, scientists, theologians, and athletes. The gold medal depicts a human hand and a mustard plant with the inscription in Latin, “The Kingdom of Heaven is like a mustard seed” (Matthew 13: 31). The hand suggests the human cooperation expected by God in the coming of the Kingdom. The mustard plant is used by Jesus as a symbol of the Kingdom's power to grow. On the back of the medal is inscribed the name of the Medalist and the year and the words, “Christian Culture Award, Assumption University.”

== Past recipients of Christian Culture Series Gold Medal (1941 - ) ==
- Sigrid Undset
- Jacques Maritain
- Henry Ford II
- Paul Martin Sr.
- Barbara Ward, Baroness Jackson of Lodsworth
- Dorothy Day
- Marshall McLuhan
- Rosemary Haughton
- Jean Chrétien
- Martin E. Marty
- Eugene Whelan
- Dominique de Menil
- Dennis Archer
- Paul Martin
- Martin Sheen
- Charles Taylor
- Cokie Roberts
- Luke Willson
- Michaëlle Jean
- Graydon Nicholas
- Measha Brueggergosman-Lee

== Notable faculty ==
- Frank Anthony DeMarco, coach, professor, multiple administrative appointments, 1946–1986 (retired from the University of Windsor)
- Wyndham Lewis, painter, novelist, critic, poet, playwright, biographer, editor, essayist, Summer, 1943–August 1945
- Marshall McLuhan, educator, philosopher, scholar, 1944–1946
- Paul Martin Sr., federal politician and statesman, 1935

== Notable alumni ==
- Fred Thomas, multi-sport (baseball, basketball, football) athlete, 1949
- Hank Biasatti, multi-sport (NBA basketball, MLB baseball) athlete
- Tony Techko, sports historian, teacher

== Sources ==
- History of Assumption University
