= Canterbury College (Windsor, Ontario) =

Canadian liberal arts college

Coordinates: 42°18′34″N 83°04′04″W

- Motto: Let Reasonableness Flourish
- Type: Theological college and seminary
- Established: 1957
- Affiliations: University of Windsor
- Religious affiliation: Anglican Church of Canada
- President: Jane Humphreys
- Location: 2500 University Avenue West; Windsor, Ontario
- Campus: Urban
- Colours: Blue and white
- Website: uwindsor.ca/canterbury/

Canterbury College is a small liberal arts college affiliated with the University of Windsor, founded by the Anglican Church of Canada and located in Windsor, Ontario, Canada. Its campus houses approximately 175 students.

== History ==
Canterbury College was incorporated in June 1957. The college appointed its first principal, Canon Rayson, in September 1957. Canterbury College and Assumption University, a Roman Catholic university, signed an affiliation agreement on November 4, 1957, in the presence of Bishops Luxton and Cody. It was the first Anglican college in the world to affiliate with a Roman Catholic university.

The college purchased its first property, located at 172 Patricia Road in Windsor and known as the St. Augustine of Canterbury House, from Clyde W. Curry Sr., in March 1958. Classes began in September 1958. The first staff member, Canon Rayson gave 7 lectures each week to the twenty-seven students enrolled in a religious knowledge course. In June 1959, the Rev. F. Temple Kingston, Ph.D., from British Columbia, was hired to teach philosophy. In the second year of the college, five courses were taught to seventy-four students. The Anglican parishes of Essex Deanery funded the college which, in turn gave lectures and presentations to the parishes. In 1959, scholarship funds were established and a building fund was created. From 1962 to 1967, Canterbury College participated in a building fund campaign with Assumption University to raise $2,500,000. The college was allocated 4% of the target amount, or $100,000, in building funds.

In December 1962, the Ontario Legislature incorporated a secular University of Windsor. In December 1963, Canterbury College, Assumption University of Windsor, Holy Redeemer College (now Académie Sainte-Cécile), Iona College (United Church Affiliate), and the University of Windsor joined in an affiliation agreement.

By 1963, Canterbury had four staff members, (including the Rev. Henry Hill [later Bishop] and the Rev. Peter Wilkinson) and 245 students registered in twelve courses. Canterbury staff were integrated with the university, with tenure and department head eligibility. Canterbury College's focus shifted from teaching to maintaining and developing a viable Christian presence within the rapidly secularizing university setting. Nevertheless, Canterbury College retained its building as a chapel and social centre, had representation on the university's board of governors, continued to give awards and bursaries, continued to appoint staff in the Department of Religious Studies, initiated courses and continued to serve students.

On November 4, 1967, Canterbury College celebrated its tenth anniversary by opening the first on-campus residence for married students in Canada. Geoffrey Fisher Hall, a 38-unit apartment building, was opened by Geoffrey Francis Fisher, 99th archbishop of Canterbury, and Lady Fisher. Assumption University conferred an honorary degree on Archbishop Fisher, the first such honour awarded to an archbishop of Canterbury by a Roman Catholic institution in four hundred years.

In November 1982, Canterbury College celebrated its 20th anniversary by unveiling the armorial bearings of Canterbury College. Theodore David Butler Ragg, Bishop of Huron, petitioned the earl marshall, the Duke of Norfolk, for a grant of armorial bearings; they were granted by the College of Heralds in the spring of 1977. The motto for Canterbury College is "Let Reasonableness Flourish".

In 1987, Canterbury College celebrated its silver jubilee. The dean and chapter of Canterbury Cathedral in England presented Canterbury College with a Canterbury Cross, which was incorporated into the ceremonial mace. The ceremonial mace was used for the first time during the anniversary celebrations. Allan Gotlieb, the Canadian ambassador to Washington, received an honorary degree at a special convocation ceremony at the University of Windsor.

In 1988, four residences with 48 bedrooms for single students were built to replace two older houses.

In 2002, Canterbury College celebrated its 40th anniversary by expanding to occupy most of a city block, with thirteen houses, and Geoffrey Fisher Hall. 2500 University Avenue West, which includes college classrooms, offices and meeting rooms, replaced the former Ramsey and Davidson Houses. St. Paul's at Canterbury, the new chapel can accommodate up to 100 people or be sectioned off to provide meeting rooms and a banquet hall. The former Anglican parish of St. Paul's brought the pictorial glass windows, altar, pulpit, font, lights and many other items from their former building on Ouellette Avenue.

Augustine House, a residence with ten bedrooms was formerly St. Augustine House, which held offices, chapel and classrooms. The eleven residences house students of the University of Windsor. Five houses are for men and six for women, all contain a kitchen, common room, laundry room, several bathrooms. There are in total, 104 individual rooms, as residences for single students.

== Academics ==
In 2026, Cantebury College offered several courses various aspects of theology and ministry. They also offered a Licentiate in Theology, which is "pre-degree program" (not to be confused with a Licentiate of Sacred Theology) for those interested in ministry in conjunction with Huron University College in London, Ontario.

Canterbury ElderCollege is an educational program at Canterbury College for adults over 55.

== Scholarships ==
The scholarship program at Canterbury has grown to twenty-nine awards, and from the interest on endowments, there will be over $8,600.00 available to be distributed this year in prizes and bursaries.
