= St. Basil's Church (Toronto) =

Church at the University of St. Michael's College

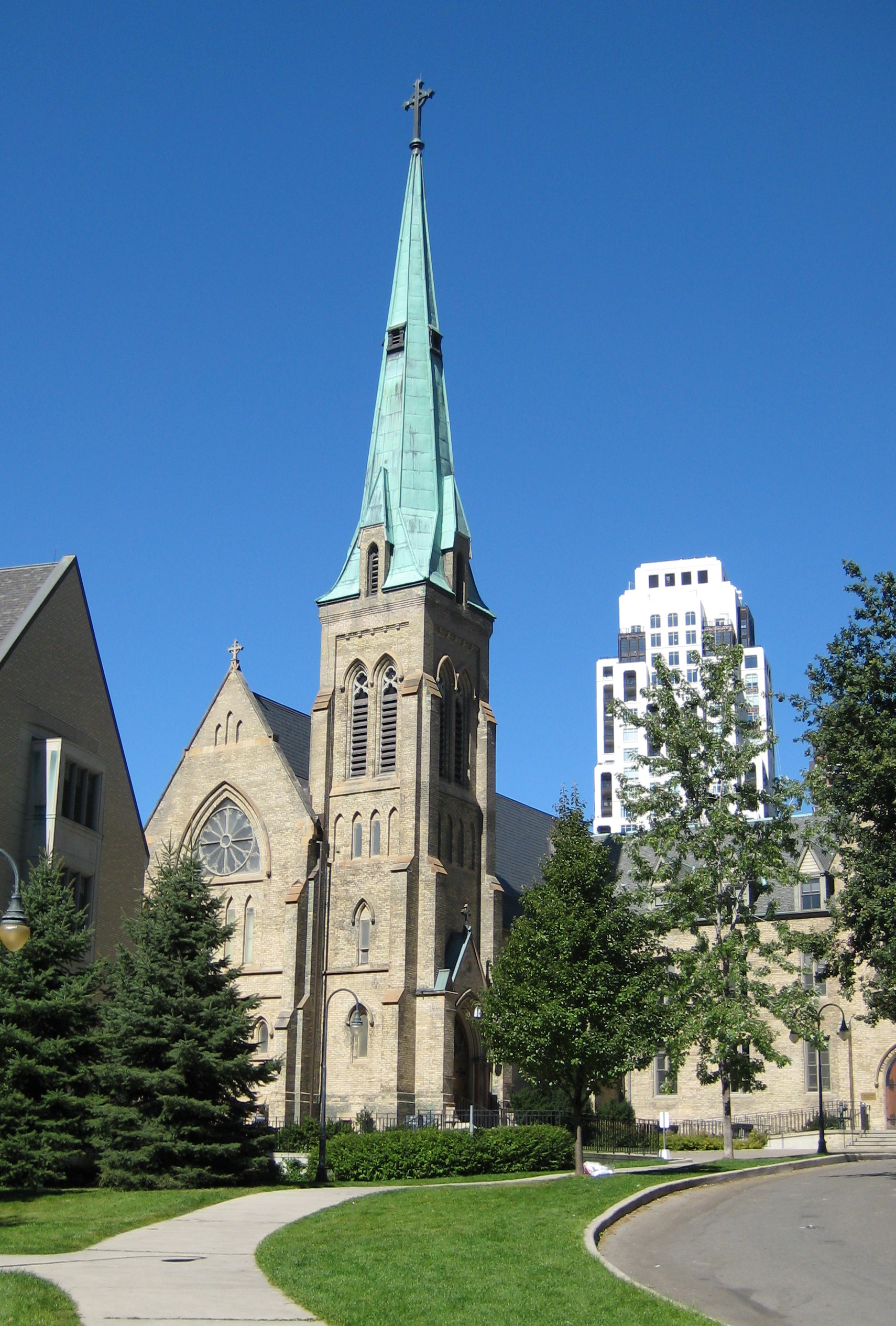
- St. Basil's Church
- 43°39′59″N 79°23′20″W
- Location: University of St. Michael's College
- Address: 50 St. Joseph Street; Toronto, Ontario; M5S 1J4
- Country: Canada
- Denomination: Roman Catholic
- Website: stbasiltoronto.org

History
- Status: Parish church

Architecture
- Functional status: Active
- Architect: William Hay (original building)
- Style: Gothic Revival
- Years built: 1856-1862 (original building)
- Groundbreaking: 15 September 1855
- Completed: 1923

Administration
- Province: Toronto
- Archdiocese: Toronto
- Parish: St. Basil

Clergy
- Pastor(s): Rev. Morgan Rice, CSB

St. Basil's Church, built in 1856, is the founding church of the Congregation of St. Basil in Toronto, Ontario, Canada. It is the college church of the University of St. Michael's College located on the St. George campus of the University of Toronto, and a parish church serving a large local congregation.

== History ==
St. Basil's Church was built as part of St. Michael's College. When the College was established by Monseigneur Armand-François-Marie de Charbonnel, the second bishop of Toronto, he entrusted it to the Basilian Fathers who began immediately to look for a site where they might build. Captain, the Honourable John Elmsley, son of the Chief Justice of the Supreme Court of Upper Canada, a convert to Catholicism and a strong supporter of Catholic education, offered to donate land for the construction of the new institution. However, he had one condition, one that the Bishop and the Basilians were quick to accept. The College should include a parish church.

The four lots that Elmsley donated were part of his estate that lay north of the city beyond clover-covered fields that rose gently to a low hill, hence its name, Cloverhill. The Basilians purchased four more lots at a cost of $2,000. The College site lay east-west across the brow of the hill at the estate's southern boundary. The Church opened for worship on September 14, 1856, the College on the following day. The September 26 issue of the Catholic Mirror, describes the building. "Approaching from the south [the city] across open fields the building, constructed of white brick of the highest quality makes a most favourable impression. The College and Church are the finest in this section of the Province being distinctly superior as to situation and appearance to the University and the Colleges that surround them in the same locality".

The general design of the building was in the hands of Father Jean-Mathieu Soulerin, the first Rector of St. Michael's College, in consultation with his Basilian Superior back in France and the Bishop. Details and construction were in the hands of a local architect, William Hay (architect). The architecture of the church was based on 13th century pointed English Gothic, with pointed arches above the windows and a gabled roof, a style favoured by Soulerin. At the official opening St. Basil's Church was fulsomely described as, "One of the finest collegiate churches in North America. Its appearance both within and without is beautiful and though much is yet to be done before it will stand forth in the fullness of the original design it gives even now a fine conception of its intrinsic architectural merit."

The initial architectural plan for the College, including St. Basil's Church, proved to be beyond the funds initially raised for the purpose. The cornerstone was officially laid on Sunday September 16, 1855; and over the following year the Basilians and a group of laymen headed by Elmsley strove mightily to raise the £12,000 (about $20,000), estimated construction costs. They were unsuccessful, however, and the plan was scaled back in line with available funds. Compared to today's figures, construction costs seem unreal. The overall cost amounted to some $12,000, which included the building itself, attendant stables, fencing and some furnishings. Records show the architect's fee was $1,000; the painting contract came to $988. The final cost of the excavation was only $464, the initial estimate having been defrayed by selling the excavated sand that was found to be suitable for use in mixing concrete.

The original St. Basil's Church was small, more accurately described as "very lofty, very short and definitely unfinished". At its consecration the Church was 100' in length and 50' in width, with stone foundation walls some 30" thick tapering to 13" above which were double brick walls with small buttresses topped by a gabled roof with dormers. The initial brick work was done in Flemish bond style, the later brick work in English bond style. The ceiling was of open timber construction, the great oak beams visibly supporting the roof. A small sanctuary was formed by a semi-circular apse extending out from the north wall. It contained an altar and several choir stalls enclosed by a semi-circular communion rail. Three glass windows behind the main altar and the two side altars were covered with some colored material, probably red bunting. There were two side aisles but no centre aisle. Seating was provided by rough wood benches. The Stations of the Cross were simple etchings. The church had a small manual organ, purchased for $800.00. At the rear (south) end of the nave a wooden partition extending from the side walls separated the nave from small vestibule area that contained two confessionals, one on each side wall. The entrance from the south façade consisted of a high wooden platform reached by two steep flights of stairs from both the east and west sides down to ground level. There was no choir loft or steeple.

Following Elmsley's death in 1863, at his request his heart was entombed in the western wall of the church just outside the sanctuary where it remains today. (His body is entombed in the crypt beneath the altar at St. Michael's Cathedral, the construction of which he had helped finance.)

At its opening in 1856 St. Basil's Church served some 50 local Catholic families and a student body of about 100, mostly boarders. It was the only church north of the cathedral. The parish boundaries extended from Carlton Street on the south then north past York Mills and Burwich to the northern boundary at Pine Grove. The eastern boundary was marked by Parliament Street on the east; extended westward to Lambton Mills and then further west on Dundas West, a very large area but one with few Catholic families. Over the next half century Toronto's Catholic population expanded, mainly from Irish immigration. So too did the St. Basil's parish congregation and the Church. As its congregation grew St. Basil's was twice expanded and refurbished.

The first expansion occurred in 1877-78 when the Church was enlarged on the north end by some 50'. The original apse was removed and a new larger sanctuary plus a sacristy constructed. A new high altar was installed, which remained until 1943, and a skylight added above it. The original high altar was moved to the side altar of the Blessed Virgin Mary on the west side of the sanctuary and a similar side altar dedicated to St. Joseph erected on the east side. Stained glass windows began to be installed. A trefoil stained glass window was created above the main altar depicting St. Michael, St. Basil and St. Charles Borromeo, the latter being the patron saint of Fr. Charles Vincent, who at the time was both the Rector of St. Michael's College and the Pastor of St. Basil's. The two windows above the side altars were also provided with stained glass. These were later bricked up, although their outline can be seen from the exterior. Stained glass was also installed in some of the windows on the west wall. The statue of the Sacred Heart, an earlier gift of Mrs. Elmsley that had stood above the tabernacle over the main altar was moved to the west wall, where it continues to stand. A small pulpit, the gift of two sisters in the parish, was erected inside the altar railing. It was later moved into the nave on the west side. A Pieta statue was added outside the sanctuary on the east wall. New Stations of the Cross, the work of Lucille Chivot, a noted French painter of religious subjects, were installed. New vestments, liturgical vessels and a sanctuary lamp were purchased, their cost met by donations from parishioners and College alumni. The completion of this expansion, renovation and refurbishment was celebrated in 1878 on the occasion of the silver anniversary of Vincent's ordination to the priesthood. Vincent was one of the four Basilians who had come to Toronto more than a quarter of a century earlier to help found St. Michael's College. At the time a deacon, he was ordained in 1853; and since 1861 had served as Rector of St. Michael's College and Pastor of St. Basil's Church.

The late 1880s saw further expansion and refurbishment of St. Basil's under the direction of Father Laurence Brennan. A St. Michael's College alumnus, Brennan was the third pastor of St. Basil's and the first who was not the College Rector. During his pastorate, which covered more than 20 years, St. Basil's was expanded a second time to meet the needs of a growing congregation. This second expansion involved the south façade and produced the church's exterior form that continues to this day.

The original south facade with its partial tower was demolished to make way for a 40' extension. This provided for an enlarged vestibule, a choir loft, a new south façade with a rose window, and a proper tower with a slated-covered steeple topped by a Celtic cross. In 1953, the slate was replaced by the current copper sheathing. The east side entrance, now primary, was provided with a pointed overhead arch and granite columns on both sides. The expanded vestibule was given a proper entrance to the nave. Three doors were installed in a wooden frame of tracery and overhead glass windows. Inside, the original wooden sanctuary floor was replaced with tile and the benches with pews. The cost of the pews was partially financed by offering a reserved pew in perpetuity to a family that donated $500. A new organ was installed. In 1892, these improvements were celebrated in conjunction with the College's golden jubilee.

Shortly thereafter a proper church bell was purchased for $800.00. It first rang on Christmas Day, 1895. In this period, the basement student chapel was expanded to the south and refurbished including the installation of stained glass windows. To mark the first anniversary of Father Brennan's death, in 1906 a west wall stained glass window of Christ blessing the children was erected and dedicated. A proper heating system was installed in 1907 and in 1911 electric lighting. Renovation in 1919-21 saw the open timber roof enclosed with a wood and plaster vaulted ceiling. At this time the stained glass in the dormer windows was removed; and the two side altars were moved back in line with the main altar. As part of the 1944-45 renovations the main altar and two side altars were replaced with new ones each having front and sides faced with Italian marble.

Following the 1960s post-Vatican II liturgical reforms, the sanctuary underwent a major change. While remaining in place the three altars ceased to be used for the celebration of the Eucharist (Mass). The sanctuary railing and choir screens were removed, as was the pulpit in the nave. The sanctuary floor was raised with four steps leading up from the nave to an altar facing the congregation. In 1980 this altar was replaced by a more permanent one dedicated to the memory of a parishioner, Colin P. O’Shea, was installed along with a matching ambo and commentator's stand. In 1981, a small shrine of St. Basil was added in the vestibule to commemorate the parish's 125th anniversary.

Under the direction of Fr. Chris Valka, CSB, the most recent extensive renovations (2014–17), saw several pews at the rear of the nave removed to create space for a baptistery area and a new baptismal font. This area now includes two Reconciliation Rooms reconstructed from the wood used in the original confessionals. The statues of the Sacred Heart and the Pieta have been moved to the rear of the nave. The Stations of the Cross have been cleaned, and placed behind glass in frames. A new sound system and new more energy efficient lighting have been installed. The multi-level platforms installed in the 1970s have been removed taking the level of the sanctuary back to its original height. The carpeting in the sanctuary has been removed to expose the earlier marble flooring on the North end of the sanctuary. New matching marble was installed in the South of the sanctuary with carpet in between. The curve of the marble on the South end represents the location of the original altar rail which was discovered during the renovation. The entire interior has been repainted. A new simpler wooden main altar has been installed along with a matching wooden ambo and lectern. The original choir stalls used since establishment of the original Northern expansion of the church have brought back up to be used in the sanctuary again.

Thanks to a substantial donation from the Basilian Fathers the pipe organ has been completely rebuilt; and the pipes have been re-arranged to allow a better view of the Rose Window. New heating, air conditioning units have been installed. The exterior brick work has been restored and new storm window shields have been installed to protect the stained glass windows.

The basement area, including the former chapel and parish hall have undergone substantial renovation to produce a large reception area, a small music room, children's play area, a quiet room suitable for prayer and Mass, plus renovated kitchen facilities and a larger number of washrooms. Substantial work was completed to update the electrical, plumbing and fire safety measures to meet modern code requirements. Decorative elements include pieces of the old sanctuary wall that were saved to be installed in the wall, as well as stained glass windows that are now backlit into the walls of the former chapel.

== St. Basil's Stained Glass Windows ==
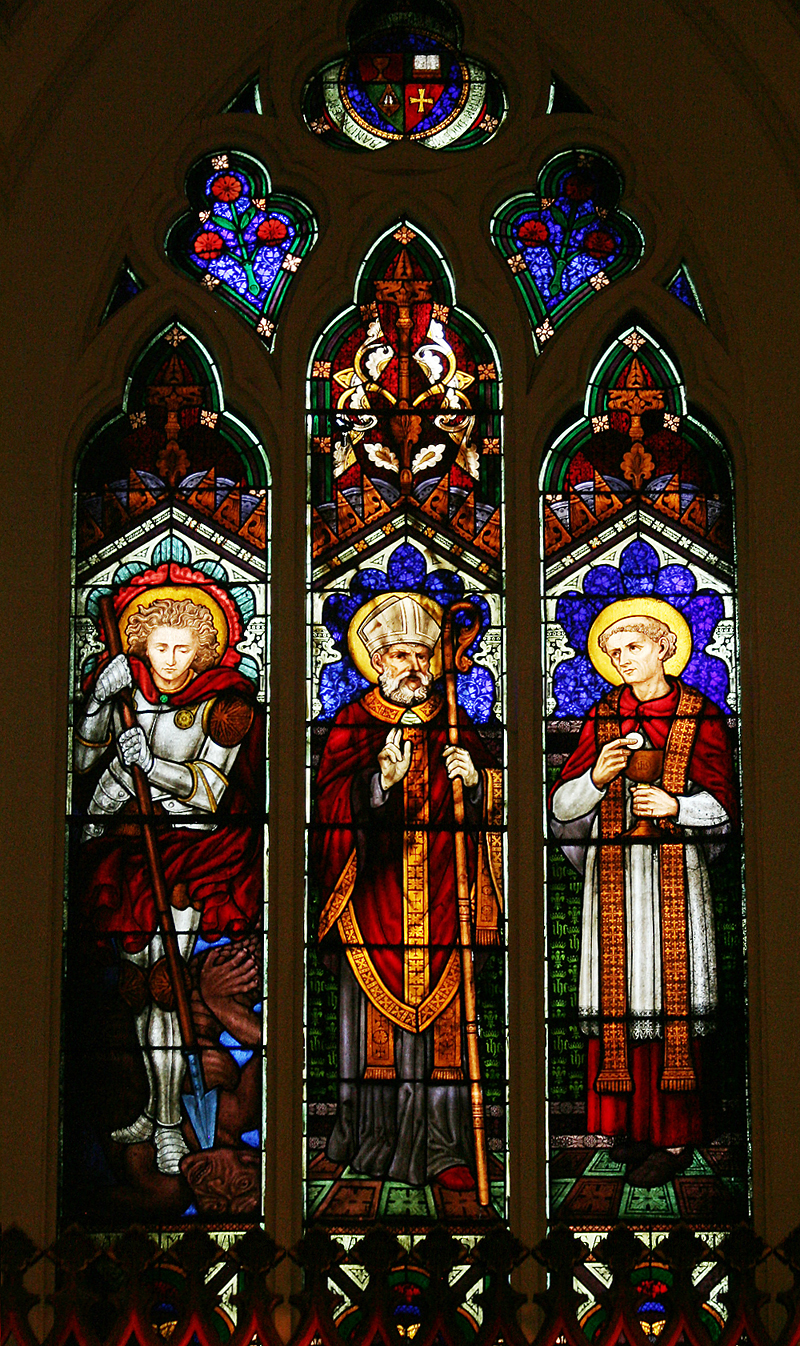
St.Basil triptych window

The original St. Basil's Church windows were of plain glass covered with red bunting. As part of the late 1870s renovations stained glass was installed in the north wall windows and a beginning was made to provide stained glass in the windows on the west wall. The stained glass is the work Nathaniel Theodore Lyon of the firm, Robert McCausland, Ltd., one of the oldest stained glass studios in North America. The cost was covered by donations from parishioners and college priest alumni.

The most prominent is the stained glass triptych window over the high altar depicting three figures. Viewed from left to right from the nave they depict St. Michael, the patron saint of the college, St. Basil, the patron saint of the Basilian Fathers, and St. Charles Borromeo, the patron saint of Father Charles Vincent, the second Rector of the College and Pastor of the Church who was oversaw the renovations the completion of which was marked by the twenty-fifth anniversary of his ordination to the priesthood. The cost of this window was covered by three priest alumni, Fathers Laurent and Rooney of Toronto and Father Heenan of Hamilton. Stained glass was also installed in the windows over the two side altars. These windows were later removed, bricked over and the wall plastered.

As part of the 1877-78 renovations stained glass was installed in the dormers and the windows on the west wall of the Church. Beginning in the sanctuary and moving south, the double windows on the west wall depict first the Blessed Virgin and Saint Joseph; next, Saint Peter and Saint Paul, then Saint Andrew and Saint James the Great, then St. John the Evangelist and Saint Matthias. The fifth window depicts Jesus blessing the children. It was dedicated in 1906 in honor of Father Patrick Brennan, the third pastor of St. Basil's, on the first anniversary of this beloved long-serving beloved pastor's death. The sixth window shows Saint Thomas and Saint Bartholomew; the seventh Saint Matthew and Saint Simon; the eighth Saint Philip and Saint Jude. The most southerly window along this wall offers an incomplete and disordered inventory of the saintly figures depicted in the windows along this wall. Votive candles were installed in 1888.

The stained-glass windows on the east wall of the church date from 1906, and were dedicated as part of the celebrations marking St. Basil's golden jubilee. Beginning in the sanctuary and proceeding southwards the first window depicts Father Jean-Mathieu Soulerin, the first St. Michael's Rector and Pastor of St. Basil's. The second depicts Saint Jean Baptiste de la Salle and Saint Aloysius, both patrons of Catholic youth and education. The third depicts the Sacred Heart of Jesus and Saint James the Less. The next depicts Saint Patrick and Saint Cecilia, Patrick, a patron of the many Irish parishioners, Cecilia, the patron saint of musicians in recognition of the important role of music in St. Basil's. The last pair of windows, now hidden behind the new confessional room, commemorates the early pastors and priests of the parish, and provides an accurate inventory of the figures depicted on that wall.

Supplementing the stained-glass windows is a series of "quatrefoil" painted decorations above each of the stained-glass windows and in the pointed arches between the pillars on each side of the centre aisle that support the roof. Twenty can be seen between these pillars, another twenty on the walls over the stained-glass windows. They embody symbols that depict various Christian motifs: the Trinity, Alpha and Omega, the Virgin Mary, Saint Joseph, Saint Basil, Saint Michael, the seven sacraments, etc.

The two stained-glass windows over the two main door entrances to the church are due to the effort of Father Rudy Deimer, Pastor of St. Basil's from 1947–1955, who commissioned them in honour of the 1956 centenary of the church. Designed by James Meehan, they depict Christ’ Resurrection, above the west entrance, and the Coronation of Mary above the east entrance.

The rose window on the south façade was erected in 1985 at the suggestion of Father James McConica, C.S.B, President of the University of Saint Michael's College. This glass used to create this new window was from the original dormer windows that were removed back in 1922 when the vaulted ceiling was installed and kept. This glass was now re-worked into a new rose window designed by Edward Low, a member of the McCausland firm that a century earlier installed St. Basil's first stained glass windows. This new window features the Holy Spirit, surrounded by symbols of the Evangelists, the Mass, Holy Scripture, the Commandments, the Sacred Heart, the Lamb of God, the Brazen Serpent, and the Passion. It, along with the stained-glass windows in the College chapel located in the basement of the Church, installed at the turn of the century, and the stained-glass windows over the two main entrances, installed in 1956, are included in the official Ontario inventory of historic stained-glass windows.

The most recent addition to the stained-glass windows of St. Basil's (installed in September 2017) have restored the stained-glass windows over the two sanctuary side altars that were bricked over almost a century ago. The restoration employs the original framework; the new windows are the creation of a master craftsman who learned his trade with the McCausland firm that constructed the 1877-78 originals. The two figures over the Marion Altar on the west side are Saint Anne and Saint Joachim, the parents of Mary, the two on the east side over the Saint Joseph Altar are Saint Mary Magdalene and Saint John the Baptist.

== Pastors at St. Basil's ==
- 1856 – 1865: Fr. Jean-Mathieu Soulerin, C.S.B.
- 1865 – 1880: Fr. Charles Vincent, C.S.B.
- 1880 – 1889: Fr. Laurence Brennan, C.S.B.
- 1889 – 1891: Fr. P. O’Donohue, C.S.B.
- 1891 – 1904: Fr. Laurence Brennan, C.S.B.
- 1904 – 1914: Fr. Michael V. Kelly, C.S.B.
- 1914 – 1922: Fr. Thomas J. Hayes, C.S.B.
- 1922 – 1925: Fr. James F. Player, C.S.B.
- 1925 – 1928: Fr. Daniel L. Forestell, C.S.B.
- 1928 – 1934: Fr. T. John McGuire, C.S.B.
- 1934 – 1937: Fr. Michael J. Oliver, C.S.B.
- 1937 – 1942: Fr. Joseph Walsh, C.S.B.
- 1942 – 1947: Fr. Daniel L. Forestell, C.S.B.
- 1947 – 1955: Fr. Rudy S. Diemer, C.S.B.
- 1955 – 1958: Fr. A. John Ruth, C.S.B.

- 1958 – 1962: Fr. Hugh J. Curran, C.S.B.
- 1962 – 1970: Fr. James A. Donlon, C.S.B.
- 1970 – 1973: Fr. William E. Coughlin, C.S.B.
- 1973 – 1975: Fr. Clifford Crowley, C.S.B.
- 1975 – 1982: Fr. Robert B. Hale, C.S.B.
- 1982 – 1985: Fr. Thaddeus T. Valencia, C.S.B.
- 1985 – 1991: Fr. Gerald Gregoire, C.S.B.
- 1991 – 1996: Fr. Thomas B. Mailloux, C.S.B.
- 1996 – 2002: Fr. George LaPierre, C.S.B.
- 2002 – 2004: Fr. Wilfrid W. Janisse, C.S.B.
- 2004 – 2007: Fr. Terence J. Kersch, C.S.B.
- 2007 – 2009: Fr. Paul M. McGill, C.S.B.
- 2009 – 2011: Fr. Terence J. Kersch, C.S.B.
- 2011 – 2013: Fr. Kenneth J. Decker, C.S.B.
- 2013 – 2017: Fr. Chris Valka, C.S.B.
- 2017 – Present: Fr. Morgan Rice, C.S.B.

== Music at St. Basil's ==
From its opening in 1856 music has held an important place in St. Basil's Church. Father Charles Vincent was one of the four Basilians who had come from France at Bishop's Charbonnel's request to establish St. Michael's College. When St. Basil's Church opened in 1856 the recently ordained Vincent, who had a rich tenor voice and a strong dedication to liturgical music, was given responsibility for music in the Church. A small manual organ had been purchased at a cost of $800.00. In charge of the choir, Vincent arranged for the appointment of an organist, a young Dutch Catholic immigrant, Sebastian Klinger whose wife was a trained soprano. He also organized a quartet that included Klinger's wife. Under Vincent's direction, the choir practiced twice weekly and participated in the Sunday High Mass in which as celebrant his rich tenor voice balanced the choir.

In 1866 Vincent, now the College Rector, asked a young Basilian priest of considerable musical talent, Father Edward Murray, to take charge as organist and choir master. By then College students had joined the choir. Owing to the small size of the sanctuary, the choir occupied the front benches outside the sanctuary. The Very Reverend John Joseph Lynch, Charbonnel's successor as Bishop of Toronto, a stern episcopal autocrat very critical of the Basilian approach to the education of young seminarians, insisted that the students who he judged were making inappropriate contact with young women in the congregation demanded that they be segregated. Vincent responded that there was no room for a choir in the small sanctuary and if the choir could no longer occupy the front rows in the nave there would be no sung Sunday High Mass. The bishop was unmoved and Vincent reluctantly agreed to their removal. As a result, for a number of years sung Sunday High Mass was discontinued. The impasse was resolved in 1878 when the sanctuary was enlarged.

Music at St Basil's expanded when Father Patrick Brennan was appointed pastor in 1881. Brenan, the first pastor who was not the College Rector, served as pastor for two decades. A music enthusiast, he oversaw the re-organization of the choir; formed a children's choir that sang at the early Sunday morning Mass and introduced congregational singing. He also arranged for the collection and edition of a group of Catholic hymns for use in congregational singing. Arranged and edited by Father Murray and some Sisters of St. Joseph, and produced in the local Salvation Army print shop, the collection was published in 1887 as the St. Basil's Hymnal. The hymnal quickly gained wide popularity; it has undergone several editions and remains in use to this day. That same year, 1887, saw the installation of a new organ in an expanded organ loft. In this period, St. Basil's was known throughout the city as the place where the finest church music could be heard.

Church music at St. Basil's received a setback in 1905 when Pope Pius X issued a decree that from henceforth Roman Catholic church choirs should be composed solely of males. This forced the dissolution of St. Basil's mixed choir, much to the dismay of its members and the parishioners. Some years later, this unfortunate decree was quietly set aside.

In 1919 a new organ manufactured by Casavant Frères was installed. It is one of the finest church pipe organs in North America. The organ console was replaced in 1960. This change was followed with a partial revision of the instrument in 1962 by Gabriel Kney and, in 1981, a full-scale cleaning and partial tonal revision of the instrument by Alan Jackson and Casavant Frères. In 2017, extensive work on the instrument was undertaken. The facade and pipework were rearranged to expose the rose window, the electronics in the console updated, and a full-scale tonal revision completed.

In 1926, Monsignor Gerald Phelan, a faculty member at the Institute of Mediaeval Studies became the choir director. He also organized and directed a schola cantorum composed of St. Michael's students and Basilian seminarians that took over the singing at Sunday High Mass. Singing in Gregorian chant in Latin, the schola re-inforced St. Basil's citywide reputation for choral excellence. In the 1930s, Cesar Borré, a well-known Toronto composer, organist and choir master was in charge. The internationally renowned organist and improviser Victor Togni served at St. Basil’s in the early 1960s. With the newly-rebuilt organ in 2017, the Director of Music & Principal Organist, Dr. John Paul Farahat, and the Assistant Organist, Adrian Ross, maintain St. Basil's reputation for fine liturgical music.

== Gallery ==
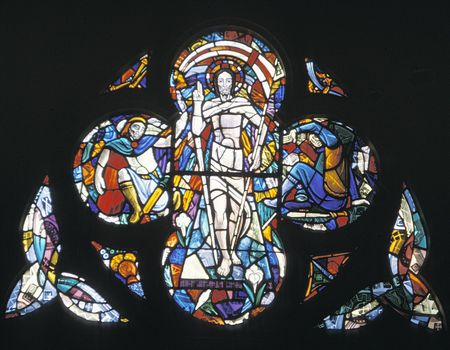
James Meechan`s Resurrection window in St. Basil's Church

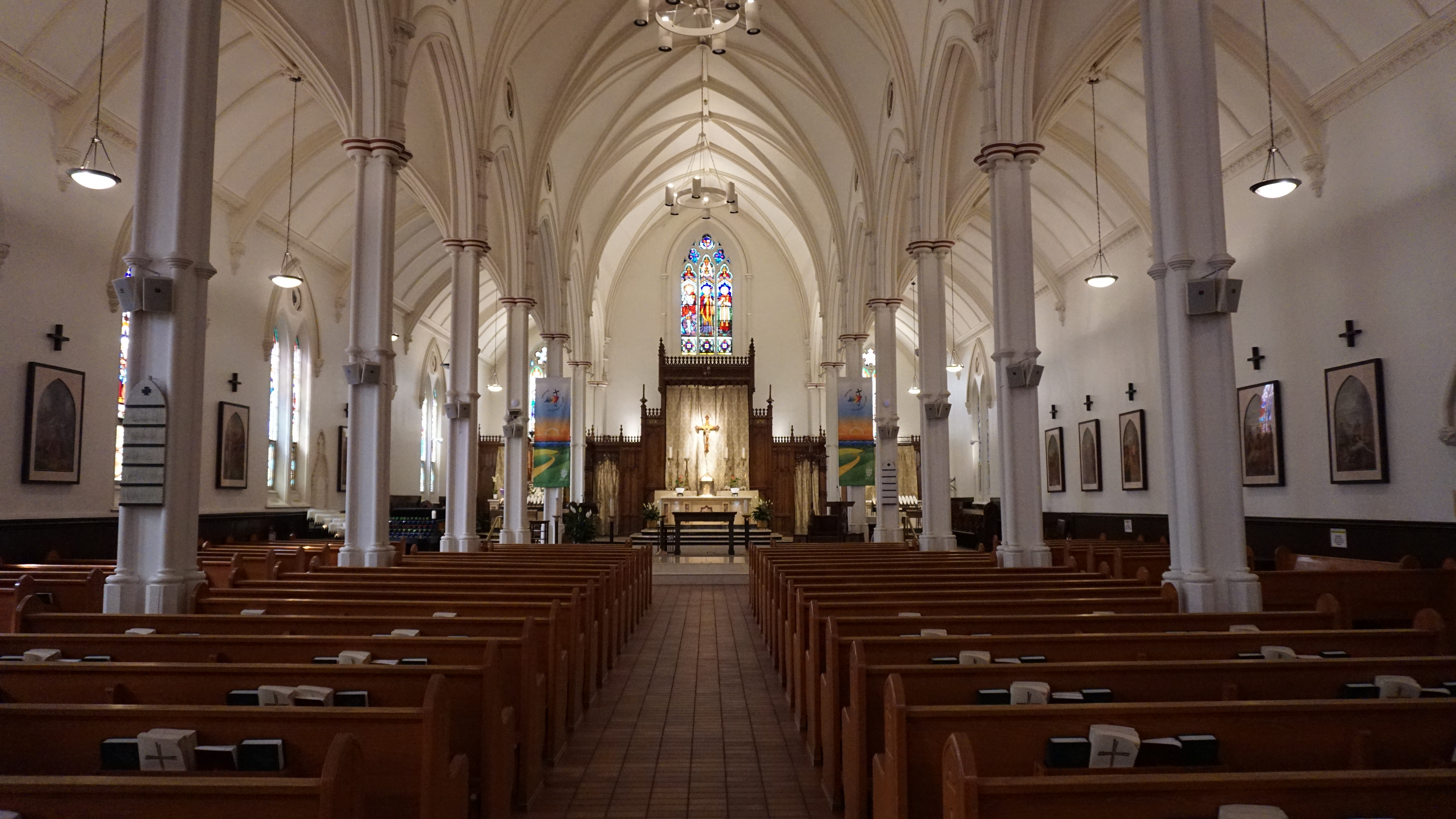
Interior view of St. Basil's Church.

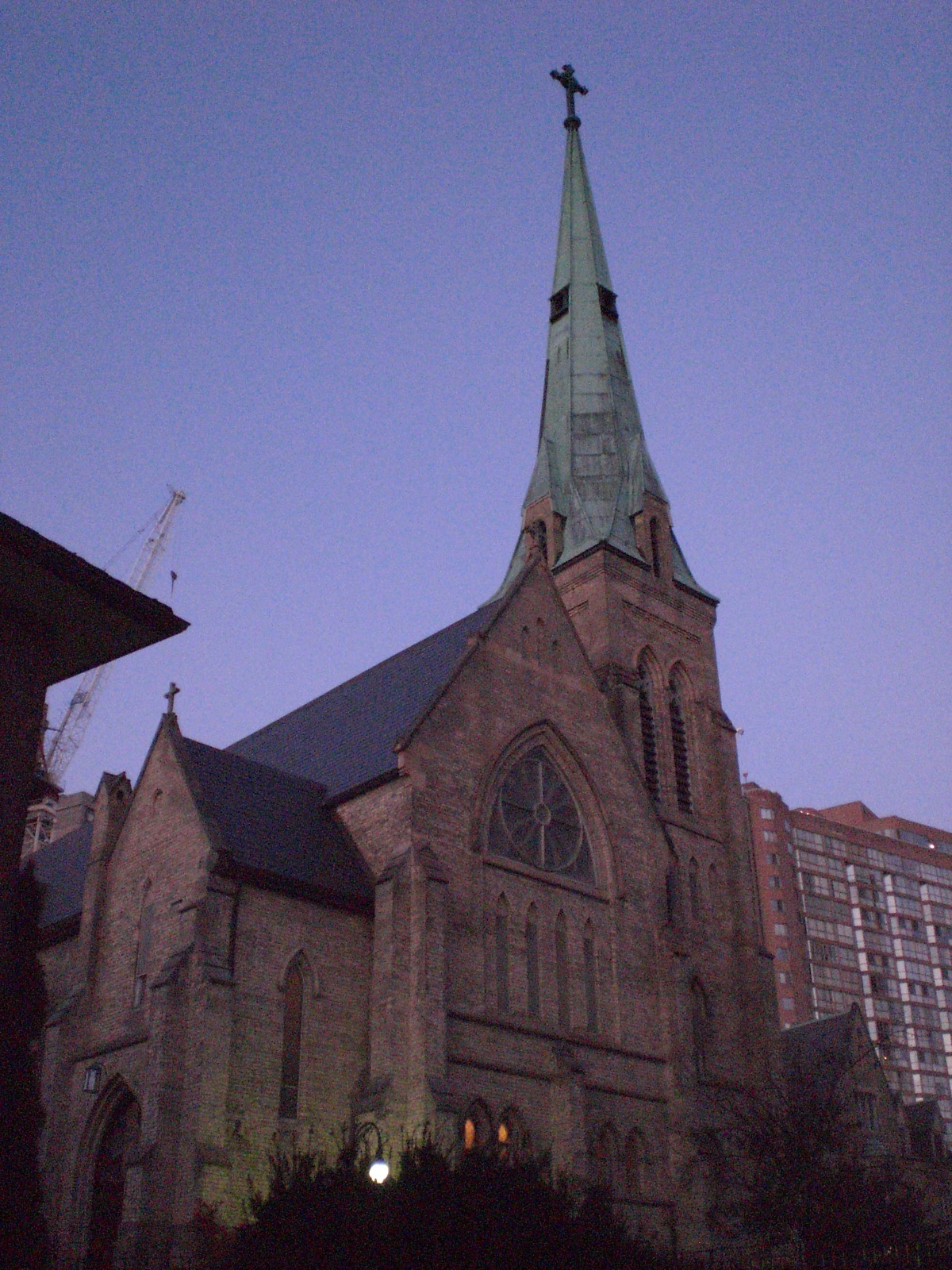
West side of the church

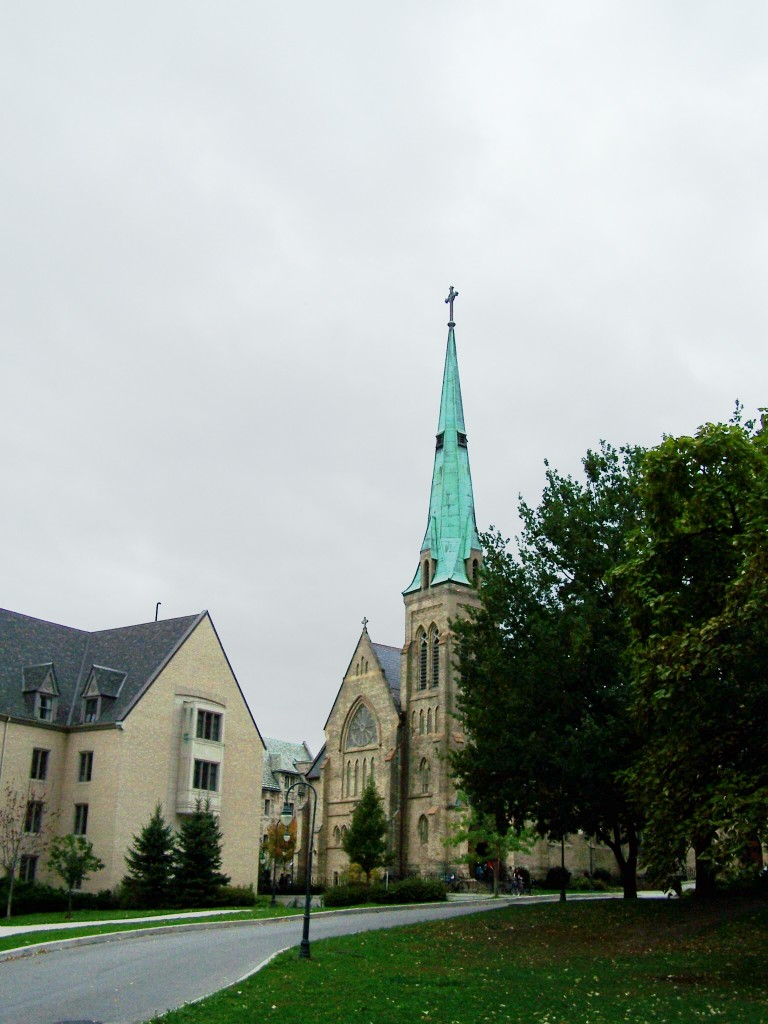
View from St. Joseph's street

== See also ==
- St. Thomas Aquinas Church (Toronto)
- List of University of Toronto buildings
