= Capuchin Friary, Crest =

Capuchin convent in Drôme, France

Coordinates: 44°44′0″N 5°0′56″E

The Capuchin Friary in Crest in Drôme, France, is a Capuchin convent.

The convent was established in 1609 in the former Benedictine priory of Crest. A small community of twelve friars lived there, following the contemplative life which that branch of the Franciscans had developed to revive. They followed a routine of prayer and study, as well as conducting preaching missions to the people of the surrounding towns and villages. The friars nursed the sick during a plague which struck the town in 1628, and carried off one-third of the townsfolk.

A school for boys was established by the friars in 1682, which they maintained till 1712. The community of friars was suppressed during the French Revolution and the friary was confiscated by the town in 1791 and sold off two years later.

The building was returned to the order in 1820. The friars were expelled once again in 1903 under the anticlerical laws in France, then in force under the Third Republic, but they were able to return in 1920. At that point, they established it as a seminary dedicated to the special preparation for their overseas mission fields in Syria and Central Africa.

Armand-François-Marie de Charbonnel, OFMCap, (1802-1891), a former Bishop of Toronto, Canada, lived here in his retirement and is buried in the friary church. Currently (2010), it is occupied by a small community of retired friars.

== Sources ==
- The Capuchin community in Crest, in history and today (in French)
