= Mark Owen Lee =

Mark Owen Lee may refer to:

- Mark Lee (left-handed pitcher) (born 1964), American former baseball player
- M. Owen Lee (1930–2019), American classics and music scholar and Roman Catholic priest
