= Charles Vincent (priest) =

Canadian-French priest and academic (1828–1890)

The Reverend Charles Vincent C.S.B.
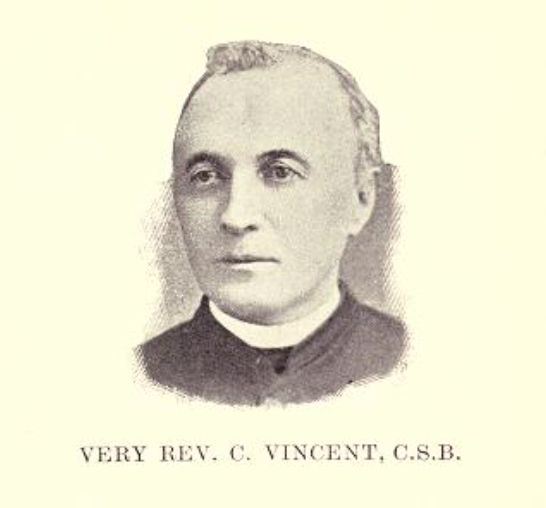
- Church: Catholic Church

Orders
- Ordination: 22 May 1853

Personal details
- Born: 30 June 1828 Vallon-Pont-d'Arc, France
- Died: 1 November 1890 (aged 62) Toronto, Ontario, Canada
- Occupation: Catholic priest, professor, and academic administrator
- Education: Basilian Collège d’Annonay

Fr. Charles Vincent C.S.B. (30 June 1828 – 1 November 1890) was a Catholic priest, professor, and academic administrator at the University of St. Michael's College in Toronto, Canada.

== Early life and career ==
Vincent was born at Vallon-Pont-d'Arc in the highlands of southern France on June 30, 1828. He was sent to Aubenas for his early education, and eventually entered the Basilian novitiate at Vernoux-en-Vivarais in 1848 at age twenty. Although Vincent was confident in his faith, he was hesitant in taking his formal priestly vows, acknowledging personal struggles with self-discipline and torpidness. Nevertheless, he persevered and continued with his theological studies at the main Basilian college in Annonay in 1851. Although not yet a priest, he showed apparent promise as a potential missionary and educator, leading the college's director, Fr. Jean-Mathieu Soulerin, to ask him to join him in establishing a new school in Canada.

In 1852, fellow alumnus of the Basilian Collège d’Annonay and recently installed Bishop Armand-François-Marie de Charbonnel sent a letter to the Basilian community back in France inviting them to establish a school in Toronto to serve the rapidly growing Catholic population. Led by Soulerin, Vincent as well as two others, Fr. William Flannery and Fr. Joseph Malbosse, departed for Canada, arriving in Toronto on September 15, 1852.

== Arrival and early years in Canada ==
After their arrival, the Basilians established a school, St. Michael's College, located within the Bishop's Palace adjacent to St. Michael's Cathedral, where Vincent would finalize his vocational training. He was formally ordained into the priesthood the following spring by Bishop Charbonnel. That same year, facing an increasing enrollment and desire for additional space, Soulerin re-established the school at its present location in what is now Toronto's Cloverhill neighborhood. Soulerin had taken a liking to Vincent, writing in a letter that he, "of all his confrères the one who has the best spirit, best minds his own business, delights in and gets along with the students, and has kept his initial piety." Known for his fine tenor voice, in 1856 Vincent organized the first choir at St. Basil's. Soulerin installed Vincent as a professor, and in 1857 appointed him as the college's treasurer. That same year Vincent made a brief trip back to France to visit his parents.

== Superior of St. Michael's College ==
In 1865, Soulerin was recalled to Annonay to be installed as Superior of the Basilian Fathers, appointing Vincent as his successor as the second Superior of St. Michael's College and second pastor of St. Basil's Parish. However, in inheriting the responsibilities that Soulerin had left him, Vincent would quickly discover he had inherited the difficulties that his predecessor had faced with Charbonnel's successor, Archbishop John Joseph Lynch.

Bishop, and by 1865 elevated to Archbishop, Lynch was skeptical of the Basilians, seeing their order as young and perhaps laxed in discipline. In particular, he was concerned with the quality of education that the college was providing, and the fact that it was not focused enough on educating seminarians. While Vincent remained deferential to Lynch's concerns, he found the Archbishop's opinions on his institution to be both confusing and over-reactionary. In 1874 Lynch wrote to Soulerin in France requesting Vincent's removal from his position as Superior, to which Soulerin not only declined, but instead promoted Vincent to the office of provincial. Lynch then proceeded to escalate his complaint straight to Pope Pius IX, who took a conciliatory position on the issue. Nevertheless, Vincent retained his position as Superior.

Encouraged by a rapid growth of vocations to his order, in 1867 Vincent attempted to establish a Basilian seminary in Louisville, Ohio, although it would close in 1873. In 1870 he dispatched Denis O'Connor, the future Archbishop of Toronto, to administer Assumption College in Windsor which had recently been acquired by the order. Over the next two decades he sent numerous priests to various locations in southern Ontario and the United States to establish or acquire new parishes.

Throughout the 1870s Vincent oversaw several major expansion projects within the college. The main buildings were renovated and enlarged to accommodate increasing enrollment. The sanctuary of St. Basil's was expanded and rearranged not only to meet the necessity of more space for the growing Catholic population in the area, but to appease Archbishop Lynch who felt that the college's students and general parishioners should not be intermingled during mass. Perhaps as a result of their reconciliation, Lynch named Vincent vicar general of Toronto in 1878.

In 1881, although largely as a result of the efforts of his colleague Fr. John Read Teefy, Vincent oversaw St. Michael's official affiliation with the University of Toronto.

== Later life and death ==
Facing the onset of troubles with his health and increasing administrative responsibilities within the order, Vincent resigned from the position of pastor of St. Basil's in 1880. He would remain as Superior of the college until 1886. He died on November 1, 1890, at age 62 in Toronto after suffering from complications from diabetes.
