= SVCC =

SVCC may refer to:

- Saddleback Valley Community Church, an Evangelical Christian church in Lake Forest, situated in southern Orange County, in Southern California
- Southside Virginia Community College, one of the 23 schools in the Virginia Community College System, sharing the same acronym with the Southwest Virginia Community College below
- Southwest Virginia Community College, also another one of the 23 schools in the Virginia Community College System, sharing the same acronym with the Southside Virginia Community College above
- Student Volunteer Campus Community may refer to SVCC Language Schools, a non-profit volunteer organization located in Edmonton, Alberta Canada
- Serenity Village Community Church, may refer to a Recovery based Christian church in Crystal, MN.
- Sri Venkateswara Cine Chitra, Indian film production company
