= John Read Teefy =

Canadian Catholic priest and educator (1848–1911)

The Reverend John Read Teefy C.S.B.
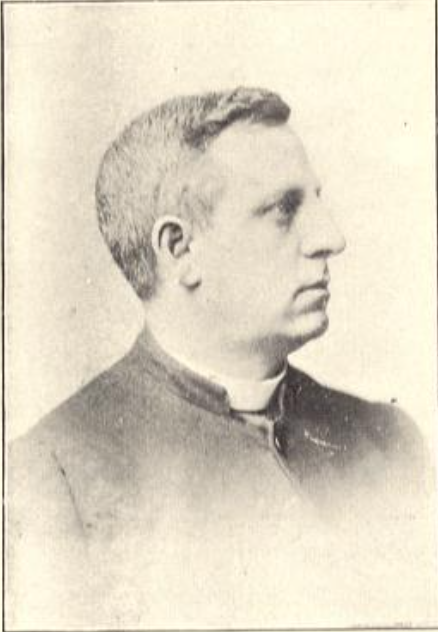
- Church: Catholic Church

Orders
- Ordination: 24 June 1878

Personal details
- Born: 21 August 1848 Richmond Hill, Ontario, Canada
- Died: 10 June 1911 (aged 62) Toronto, Ontario, Canada
- Occupation: Catholic priest, professor, journalist, and academic administrator
- Education: University of Toronto, (B.A., M.A., LL.D)

John Read Teefy C.S.B. (21 August 1848 – 10 June 1911) was a Canadian Catholic priest, professor, journalist and administrator who served at the University of St. Michael's College in Toronto, Canada. He was a member of the Congregation of St. Basil.

== Early life and education ==
John Read Teefy was born at Richmond Hill, Ontario, just north of the city of Toronto, on August 21, 1848, the second of nine children to Matthew Teefy (1822–1911) and Betsey Faran Clarkson (1823–1909). His father, Matthew, was an Irish immigrant who served as the long-time postmaster of Richmond Hill. Several of his siblings emigrated to California in the late Nineteenth century, including his younger brother, Robert Baldwin Teefy (1859–1937), who would become one of the founders of the Bank of Italy, which would later become the Bank of America.

Teefy was first educated at Richmond Hill Grammar School and then entered into University College at the University of Toronto in 1867, where he studied classics and mathematics. After graduating in 1871, he taught at high schools around southern Ontario including at Port Rowan, Beamsville, and Hamilton.

In 1874, Teefy decided to enter into the priesthood at Saint-Sulpice Seminary in Montreal, and in 1877 entered the Basilian Novitiate at Assumption College in Windsor. He was ordained a priest by Archbishop John Walsh on June 24, 1878.

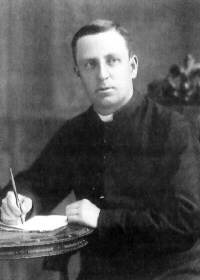
Fr. Teefy around 1883.

Following his ordination, in 1878 Teefy was assigned to serve as a professor and priest at St. Michael's College in Toronto. There he taught mathematics, philosophy, and English. In 1887–1888 he briefly taught at Basilian College of Mary Immaculate (now St Boniface's Catholic College) at Plymouth, England, before returning to St. Michael's at the end of 1888.

== Superior of St. Michael's College ==
Upon his return, in 1889 Teefy was made the Superior of St. Michael's College and would serve in that capacity until 1903. Historian Martin Friedland describes Teefy's vision for the college as desiring to "build a great Catholic university... bearing the same relation to modern times that the University of Salamanca did to medieval." In 1881, alongside Fr. Charles Vincent, CSB, Teefy worked with Vice-Chancellor Sir William Mulock to make St. Michael's the first to federate with the University of Toronto. One of Teefy's successors, Fr. Henry Carr, CSB, would write that Teefy was instrumental in the founding and formulation of the modern University of Toronto and would set a standard for the organization of Canadian higher education, which would follow the model that he and Murlock created. It also created an important precedent, Carr suggests, that demonstrated that Catholic and Protestant educational institutions, which has historically been separated, could enjoy a productive coexistence within the same organization.

In 1892, Teefy wrote a history of the Archdiocese of Toronto entitled: "Jubilee Volume, 1842–1892: the Archdiocese of Toronto and Archbishop Walsh." In 1893, he became the first editor of The Catholic Register. In 1894, he received a Master of Arts degree and in 1896 a Doctor in Law degree, both from the University of Toronto. In 1903, after serving for fifteen years, Teefy resigned as Superior of St. Michael's College.

== Later life and death ==
Following his time at St. Michael's College, in 1903 Teefy was named the pastor of Holy Rosary Parish in Toronto. He remained active journalist through the remainder of his life, serving as the chief editor of the Catholic Record beginning in 1904.

In 1906, Teefy was appointed a member of the University of Toronto Board of Governors, and continued to be involved in university matters. In 1910, he was elected as the Assistant Superior General of the Basilian Fathers.

Teefy died on June 10, 1911 in Toronto at the age of 62. In his eulogy at Teefy's funeral mass, Fr. Robert McBrady, CSB, one of Teefy's successors at St. Michael's College, said of him, "There is no estimating the far-reaching and wholesome influence Dr. Teefy exercised over the generation of students who passed through St. Michael's during his term of office. Father Teefy's influence for good was infeed wide and far-reaching, and this diocese met with a great blow in his death."

== Legacy ==
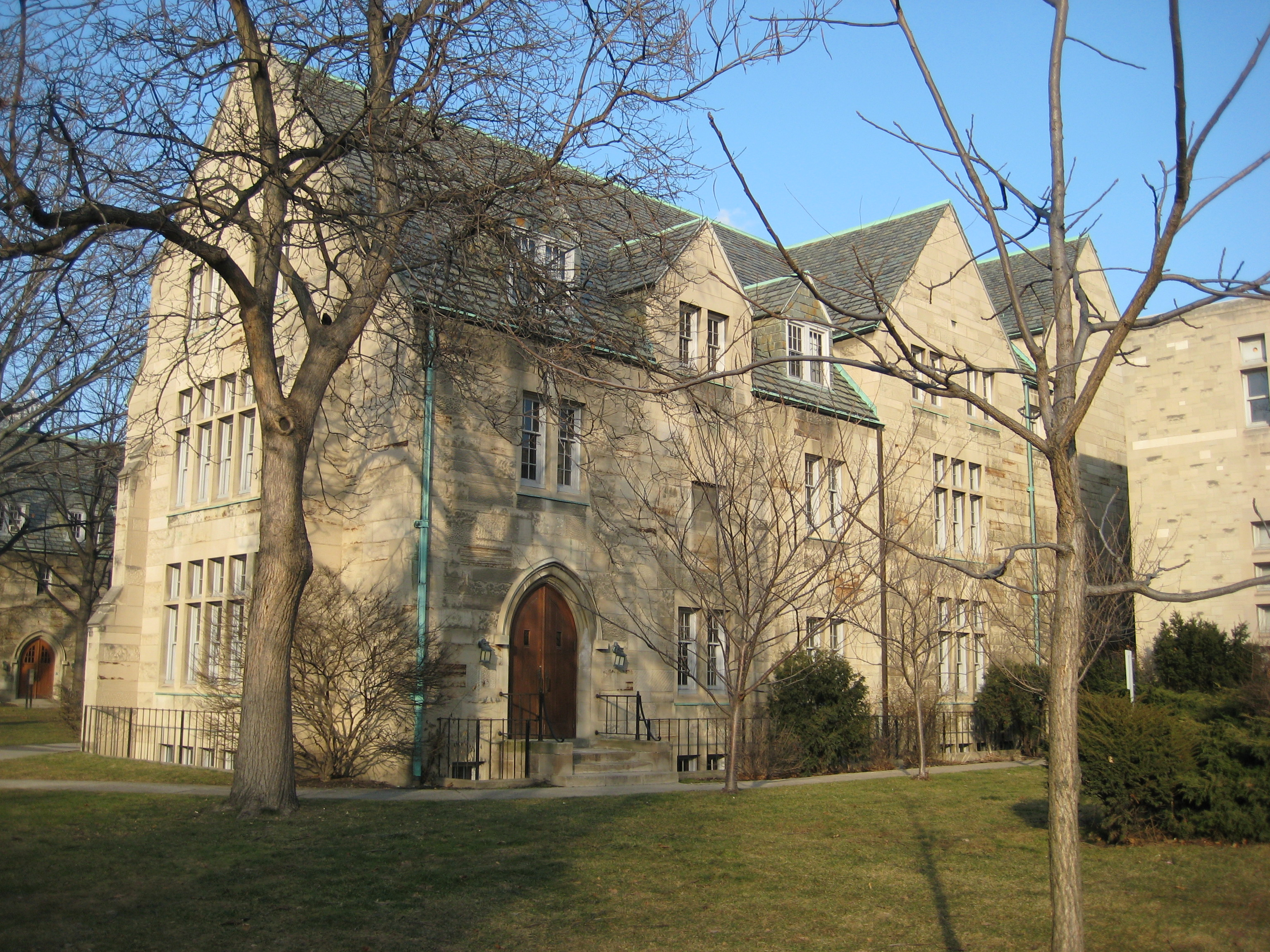
Teefy Hall (1936).

Today, as a result of Teefy's work, St. Michael's College remains one of the seven undergraduate colleges that make up the University of Toronto. In 1936, Teefy Hall, a student residence and academic building at St. Michael's College, was named in his honor.

== Writings ==
- Jubilee Volume, 1842–1892: the Archdiocese of Toronto and Archbishop Walsh (1892)
- The Worship of God: A Course of Lenten Sermons (1902)

== Bibliography ==
- Carr, Henry, "The Very Reverend J.R. Teefy, C.S.B., LL.D." Canadian Catholic Historical Association Report, 7(1939–40), 85–95.
- Friedland, Martin. The University of Toronto: A History (University of Toronto Press, 2002), 107–108.
- Hoskin, Mary, History of St. Basil’s parish, St. Joseph Street (Toronto, 1912)
