= Aiya Collective =

The aiya哎呀 Collective is an Edmonton-based cultural community established by intergenerational artists and workers. Their main focuses include the regeneration of the Downtown Chinatown area, creating space for minorities and addressing the ongoing cultural erasure of Chinatown. Cofounders Lee Rayne Lucke, Shawn Tse, Wai-Ling Lennon, and Lan Chan-Marples, were inspired to take action after the removal of the Chinatown Harbin Gate 2017.

== Founders ==
Lee Rayne Lucke is an artist, cultural worker, and community organizer whose work focuses on spatial justice and the ways in which art can challenge and disrupt existing power structures. Their approach uses collective artistic actions and participatory methods to address and shift systems of inequality. With the aiya哎呀 collective, they create spaces that invite reflection on the emotional and geographic loss of amiskwacîwâskahikan’s Chinatown, particularly through its intersections with colonial histories and contemporary struggles. Through this lens, Lucke's work aims to reimagine urban spaces in a decolonial context, fostering new ways of being and relating to the city.

Shawn Tse is a co-founder of aiya哎呀 Collective and Chinatown Greetings, two initiatives focused on amplifying cultural expression and community engagement. As a multi-disciplinary artist, educator, and organizer, his work spans digital media and theatre, with a commitment to using art as a tool for social connection and cultural preservation. His artistic practice often explores themes of place-making and place-keeping, with a particular emphasis on Chinatown. Through his projects, Tse seeks to capture and safeguard the cultural heritage and collective memory of the Chinatown community, while also fostering dialogue around the impacts of urban development and gentrification.

Lan Chan-Marples is a dedicated Chinatown advocate focused on researching and sharing the history of Edmonton’s Chinatown. As a member of the aiya哎呀 Collective in Chinatown, she works to preserve its cultural heritage and influence community engagement. She also volunteers as a facilitator with Chinese community services and the Canadian Multicultural Education Foundation. With nearly 20 years of experience at the University of Alberta, she supported research initiatives in the Research Services Office (now Research Administrative Services), collaborating with non-profit and government sectors to bridge academic and community needs.

Wai-Ling Lennon is a core member of the aiya哎呀 collective, an educator, and an active community participant. She has served as president and volunteer teacher for the Student Volunteers Campus Community (SVCC) at the University of Alberta. Wai-Ling is also involved with the Edmonton Chinatown Chinese Library, where she contributes to efforts focused on preserving the cultural heritage of Chinese Edmontonians. Additionally, she co-authored the "Now or Never: Community Cookbook," which contributes to the documentation and celebration of community traditions.

== Name ==
The word aiya 哎呀 is a commonly used interjection in Cantonese Chinese, often used to express surprise; however, depending on the context, each saying has a different meaning and emotion.

Lee Rayne Lucke was inspired by the Chinese expression, aiya, which could mean both "Oh wow" and "Oh no." The collective's name represents their resistance to labelling themselves and their choice to sit in the gray area of social justice organizing and art-making.

== History ==
The formation of the aiya哎呀 Collective began late in 2017. During this time, Chinatown, an area roughly a 3-block radius centred in the downtown core of Edmonton, Alberta, was facing the possibility of "slum clearance" due to the overwhelming rate of crime in the area, which was threatening the safety of community members. Lee Lucke was working on an Edmonton Heritage Council-granted art heritage project centered around Chinatown and saw this as an opportunity to create the aiya哎呀 Collective to spread cultural awareness and expression of Chinatown while also embracing the community and bringing them together through the culture and history of Chinatown. Since then, the aiya哎呀 Collective has organized events to address the increased gentrification of Chinatown.

On March 17, 2018, the organization launched their first public event: "Harbin Gate Remembrance (A gathering.)"; the project was titled “Love Letters to the Chinatown Harbin Gate.' The group's second project, "Gentrification Party (September 2018)"." This project was created in response to the 2017 dismantling of the gate to make way for the upcoming LRT extension in Edmonton. The events consisted of cultural performances, discussion panels, speeches, and more.

In 2021, the aiya哎呀 Collective and the Ociciwan Contemporary Art Centre banded together to develop the kamâmak nihtâwikihcikan ᑲᒫᒪᐠ ᓂᐦᑖᐃᐧᑭᐦᒋᑲᐣ community garden, which invites individuals to reflect, learn, interact, and care for medicine plants as means to build a bridge between community and culture.

With their continuous growth and consistent projects, the aiya collective received its first municipal grant in 2024 in "Local Anti-racism Capacity Building and Innovation." Through this grant of $27,571, the aiya哎呀 Collective strives to promote anti-racism and inclusivity in Edmonton and area through the program of the "Chinatown Care Package Series."

In addition, aiya哎呀 collective has won the Chinatown Impact Award for two consecutive years (2024 - 2025.)
