= Jean-Mathieu Soulerin =

4th Superior General of the Congregation of St. Basil (1807–1879)

The Reverend Jean-Mathieu Soulerin C.S.B.
- Superior General of the Congregation of St. Basil
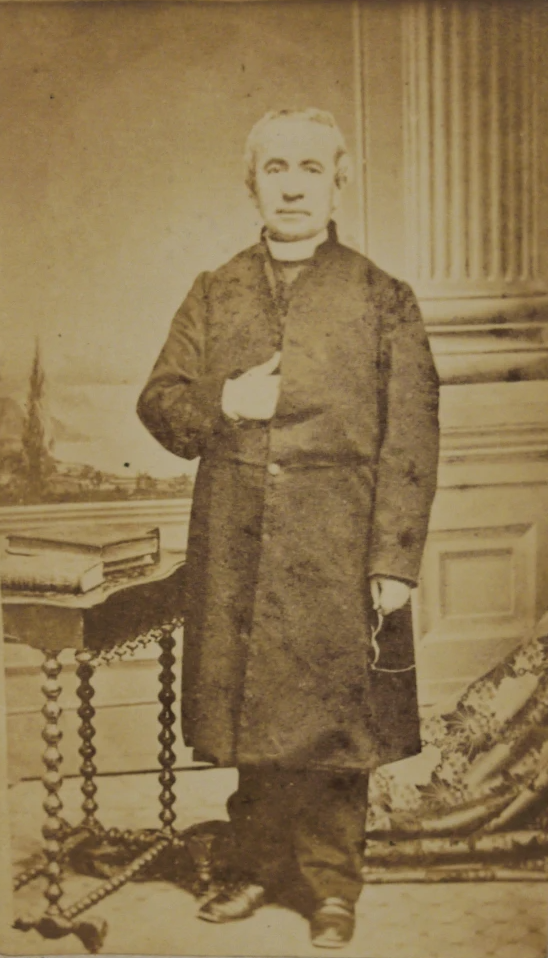
- Church: Catholic
- In office: 19 January 1865 – 17 October 1879
- Predecessor: Julien Actorie
- Successor: Adrien Fayolle
- Previous posts: Vicar general of Toronto; Vicar general of London; Vicar general of Viviers

Orders
- Ordination: 20 December 1834

Personal details
- Born: 6 June 1807 Ailhon, France
- Died: 17 October 1879 (aged 72) Annonay, France
- Education: Basilian Collège d'Annonay; University of Paris

Jean-Mathieu Soulerin C.S.B. (6 June 1807 – 17 October 1879) was the fourth Superior General of the Congregation of St. Basil and primary founder of the University of St. Michael's College in Toronto, Canada.

== Early life and career ==
Soulerin was born on June 6, 1807, in the village of Ailhon in the south of France, where he spent much of his early life. As a young man he went to Annonay and enrolled at the Basilian college there, where he decided to become a priest. He was formally ordained into the Roman Catholic priesthood on December 20, 1834. In 1836 he briefly entered into the University of Paris to further his studies, and in 1837 toured Italy, Belgium, and England before returning to France. He was assigned to teach at the college in Feyzin (near Lyon) until 1842 when he was asked to return as the director of the college in Annonay. He remained there until he received an invitation from a fellow alumnus of the Basilian college, Armand-François-Marie de Charbonnel, who was recently installed as Bishop of Toronto, to establish a school in his rapidly growing city. At the time, just over one quarter of Toronto's population identified as Roman Catholic, particularly with the surge of immigrants arriving from Ireland, yet there did not yet exist any Catholic institutions of higher education. The Superior of the Basilian Fathers, Fr. Pierre Tourveille, assigned Soulerin, as well as three others: Fr. William Flannery, Charles Vincent, and Fr. Joseph Malbosse, to heed Charbonnel's call. Soulerin and his companions arrived in Toronto on September 15, 1852, by way of New York.

== Toronto ==
Just one year earlier, in 1851, also at the invitation of Bishop Charbonnel, five priests of the Christian Brothers Order had arrived in Toronto and established De La Salle College, which at the time was located at Lombard and Jarvis Streets. But as the city began to expand northward, there came a need to build a second institution. Soulerin and his team initially founded two institutions: St. Michael's College, which was to serve students at the secondary and collegiate levels, and St. Mary's Lesser Seminary, which was to prepare young men for the priesthood. However, the following year, in 1853, it was decided that the two institutions should unite under the name of the former, and Soulerin was installed as its first Superior. The college was located within the Bishop's Palace adjacent to St. Michael's Cathedral. However, as the college began to grow beyond its means, with over fifty students its second year, Soulerin recognized the necessity to find a campus of their own.

In securing a substantial lot of property in what was then beyond the city's northern limits from the wealthy statesman and Catholic convert Captain John Elmsley, Soulerin re-established the college and adjacent St. Basil's Church at their present locations in what is now Toronto's Cloverhill neighborhood.

Although it was formally designed by William Hay, Soulerin was actively involved in helping design the new church, in addition to consulting with his own superiors back in France on its details. After its completion in 1856 he would serve as its first pastor until 1865.

The college quickly began to flourish in its new home, and Soulerin oversaw its continual early expansion as its capable administrator. The college was, as it would be for much of its history, dominated by Irish Canadians. In 1856 he established the St. Basil's Novitiate which began to attract Catholic students from both across eastern Canada and the United States, particularly upstate New York. In addition to serving as Superior, Soulerin taught courses on logic, natural philosophy, and chemistry.

During the late 1850s, he was appointed vicar general of the diocese by Bishop Charbonnel, and would continue to do so under his successor, Bishop Lynch, in the early 1860s. From 1857 to 1858, when Bishop Charbonnel was away in Europe, he trusted Soulerin as the administrator of the diocese until his return. That same year, Bishop Pinsonnault of London, Ontario named him a vicar general. In 1863 he also helped administer nearby St. Mary's Parish, and helped establish various Catholic missions throughout southern and western Ontario.

== Return to France ==
Having become well known for his success in Canada, Soulerin was elected as Superior General of the Basilian Fathers on January 19, 1865, and soon returned to Annonay. During his tenure, the Basilians would reach their peak in France and saw significant growth in both Canada and the United States. He was also named vicar general of his home diocese of Viviers. In 1878 he published Constitutions de la congrégation de Saint-Basile which laid out his vision for the order.

Soulerin died in Annonay on October 17, 1879, at the age of 72.

== Legacy ==
Today St. Michael's College is one of the seven primary undergraduate colleges that make up the University of Toronto. Soulerin House is the honorary name of the fourth floor of Elmsley Hall, one of St. Michael's undergraduate residence buildings. A stained glass window, toward the rear of the sanctuary of St. Basil's, depicts and honors Soulerin's memory as the church's first pastor.

== Writings ==
- "Missions du Canada," Annales de la propagation de la foi (Lyon), XXVIII (avril 1856), 308–19
- Constitutions de la congrégation de Saint-Basile (Lyon, 1878)

== Bibliography ==
- Boland, Francis, "Father Soulerin, C.S.B., founder and administrator," CCHA Report (1956), 13–27.
- Chomel, Adrien, Le collège d’Annonay, 1800–1880, mémoires et souvenirs (Annonay, 1902)
- Roume, Charles, Origines et formation de la communauté des prêtres de Saint-Basile, contribution à l'histoire religieuse du Vivarais (Privas, 1965)
- Scollard, J.D., Dictionary of Basilian biography, lives of members of the Congregation of Priests of Saint Basil from its beginnings in 1822 to 1968 (Toronto, 1969), 148–50.
- Shook, L.K., "St Michael's College, the formative years, 1850–1853," CCHA Report (1950), 37–52.
- Shook, L.K., "The coming of the Basilians to Assumption College, early expansion of St Michaels College," CCHA Report (1951), 59–73.
