= James Meechan =

Scottish-Canadian artist (1930–2026)

- Born: 17 August 1930; Glasgow, Scotland
- Died: 25 March 2026 (aged 95); Waterloo, Ontario, Canada
- Education: Glasgow School of Art
- Known for: Stained glass artist, educator

James Meechan (17 August 1930 – 25 March 2026) was a Scottish-Canadian artist best known for his stained glass work.

== Life and career ==
Born in Glasgow, Scotland, during the Great Depression, Meechan attended Holyrood Secondary School before moving on to the Glasgow School of Art where he achieved a post-graduate diploma in stained glass in 1953. He received commissions for windows from a number of churches in Scotland.

In 1953, he emigrated to Canada, settling in Toronto where he established himself as a professional artist - primarily as a designer and maker of stained glass, but also as a painter and muralist.

He married Katharine Hanlon in 1954.

Meechan received more stained glass window commissions from churches, colleges and hospitals in Canada. His work was exhibited by the National Gallery of Canada, the Art Gallery of Ontario, the Ontario Society of Artists, and in liturgical art exhibitions in Canada and the United States.

To supplement his earnings from stained glass, and to support his growing family, he qualified as a secondary school teacher in the province of Ontario. For a number of years he taught at Central Technical School, alongside Canadian artist Doris McCarthy. There Meechan played a key role in the students' creation of the colossal ketchup bottle in 1967, built to poke fun at Claes Oldenburg's giant hamburger which was then on display at the Art Gallery of Ontario.

Later in 1967, he moved to Downsview Secondary School, as head of its art department. However he soon recognised the need and initiated plans for more extensive visual arts education in the Toronto area that, two years later, led to the creation of the C.W. Jeffery's Art Centre in the City of North York around which C. W. Jefferys Collegiate Institute was built. Through his leadership there (until retirement in 1986), the Art Centre quickly became one of Metropolitan Toronto's foremost visual art departments at the high school level, with many of its graduates accelerated into the Ontario College of Art and professional art careers. Meechan also initiated a program of art classes for adults uniquely offered by the North York School Board, and served as an associate teacher for the Faculty of Education at the University of Toronto.

After retiring from full-time teaching, Meechan continued to receive commissions for stained glass windows after that time. The subjects of his windows, understandably, usually had religious themes. However, the subjects of his watercolours, however, often included the shore of Lake Huron near Southampton, Ontario, where his family cottaged for decades.

Meechan's work was exhibited by the National Gallery of Canada, the Art Gallery of Ontario, the Ontario Society of Artists, and in liturgical exhibitions in Canada and the United States.

Meechan's art earned him election to the Ontario Society of Artists, having joined in 1966, and eventual recognition as an OSA lifetime member.

Meechan died on 25 March 2026, at the age of 95.

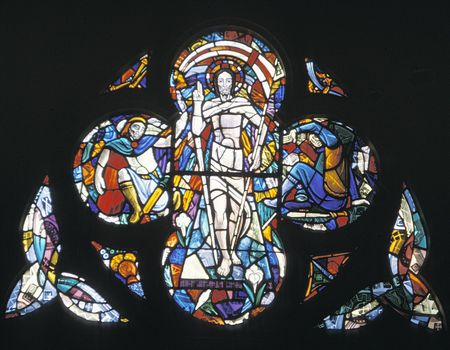
Resurrection window in St. Basil's Church, Toronto
