= Tour de Crest =

Vestige of a castle in the Drôme département of France

Coordinates: 44°43′49″N 5°1′25″E

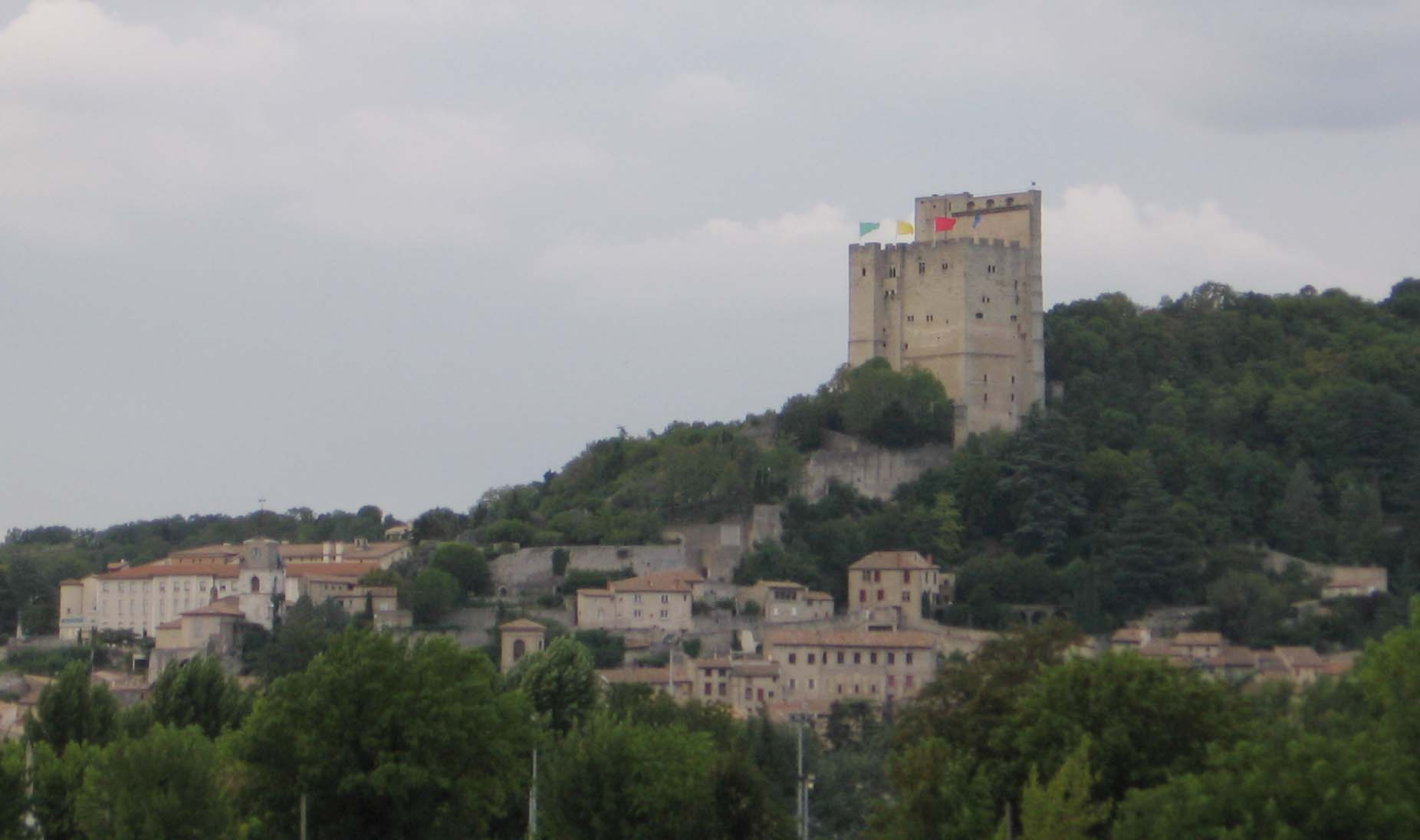
Tour de Crest

The Tour de Crest (Crest Tower) is the imposing vestige of a castle - the Château de Crest - in the commune of Crest in the Drôme département of France, one of the highest keeps in Europe, if not the highest (52 metres/171 feet).

== History ==
In 1120, a letter from Pope Calixte II was sent from the Château de Crest (« Castrum Cristam »). It was at about this time that, around the foot of the tower, a medieval town was developing bearing the name of the master of the area, Lord Arnaud de Crest.

In 1394, the Château de Crest had a grand square tower built of dressed stone.

Cardinal Richelieu, on the orders of Louis XIII, destroyed the castle leaving only the massive tower which today dominates the town of Crest.

The upper floors of the keep, originally defensive in purpose, were transformed into a prison and remained thus until 1873. The walls are covered with inscriptions by exiles from the Second Empire.

The Tour de Crest was classified as a monument historique on 6 June 1877. It has belonged, since 1988, to the town, which has allowed tourists to visit it.

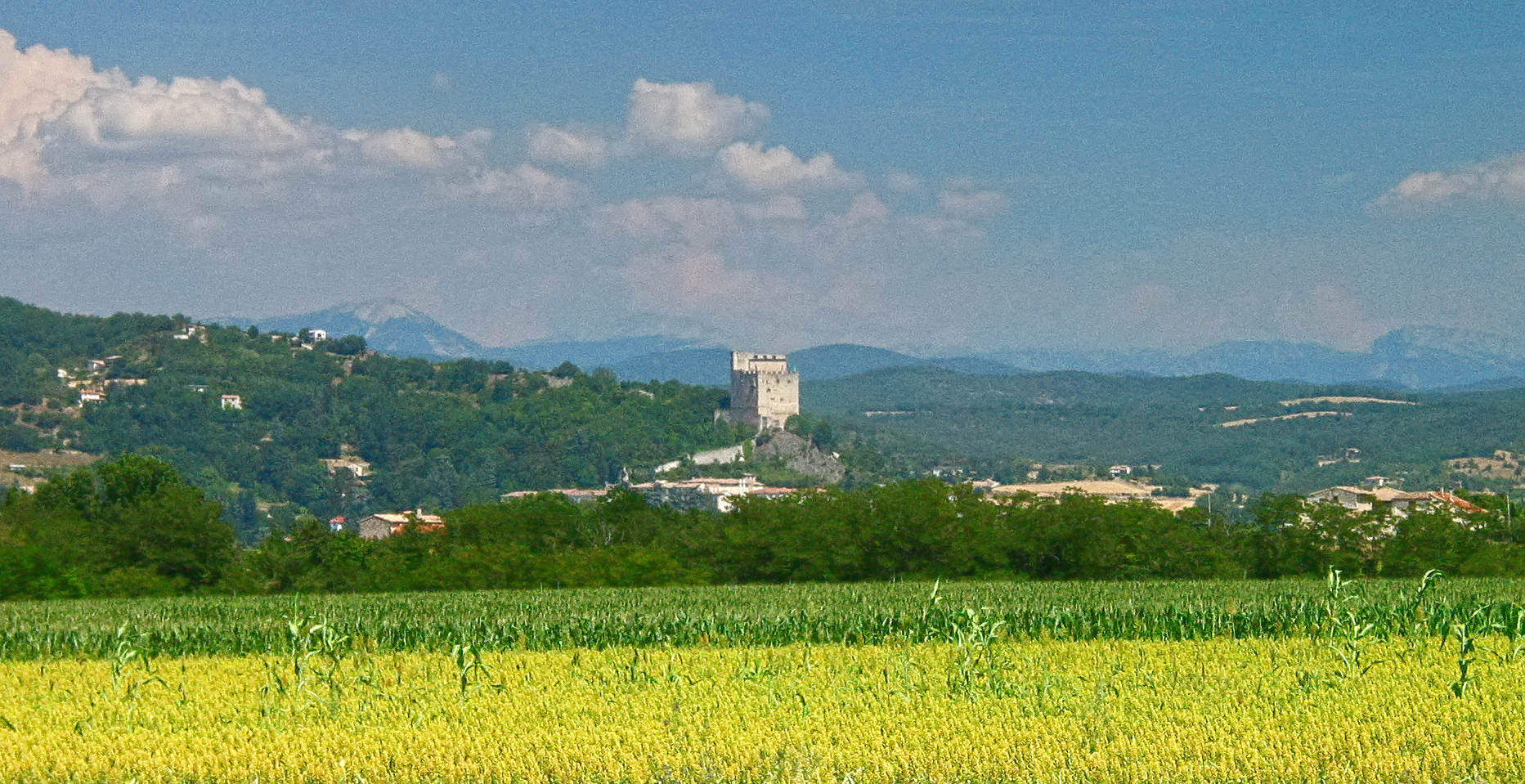
Tour de Crest

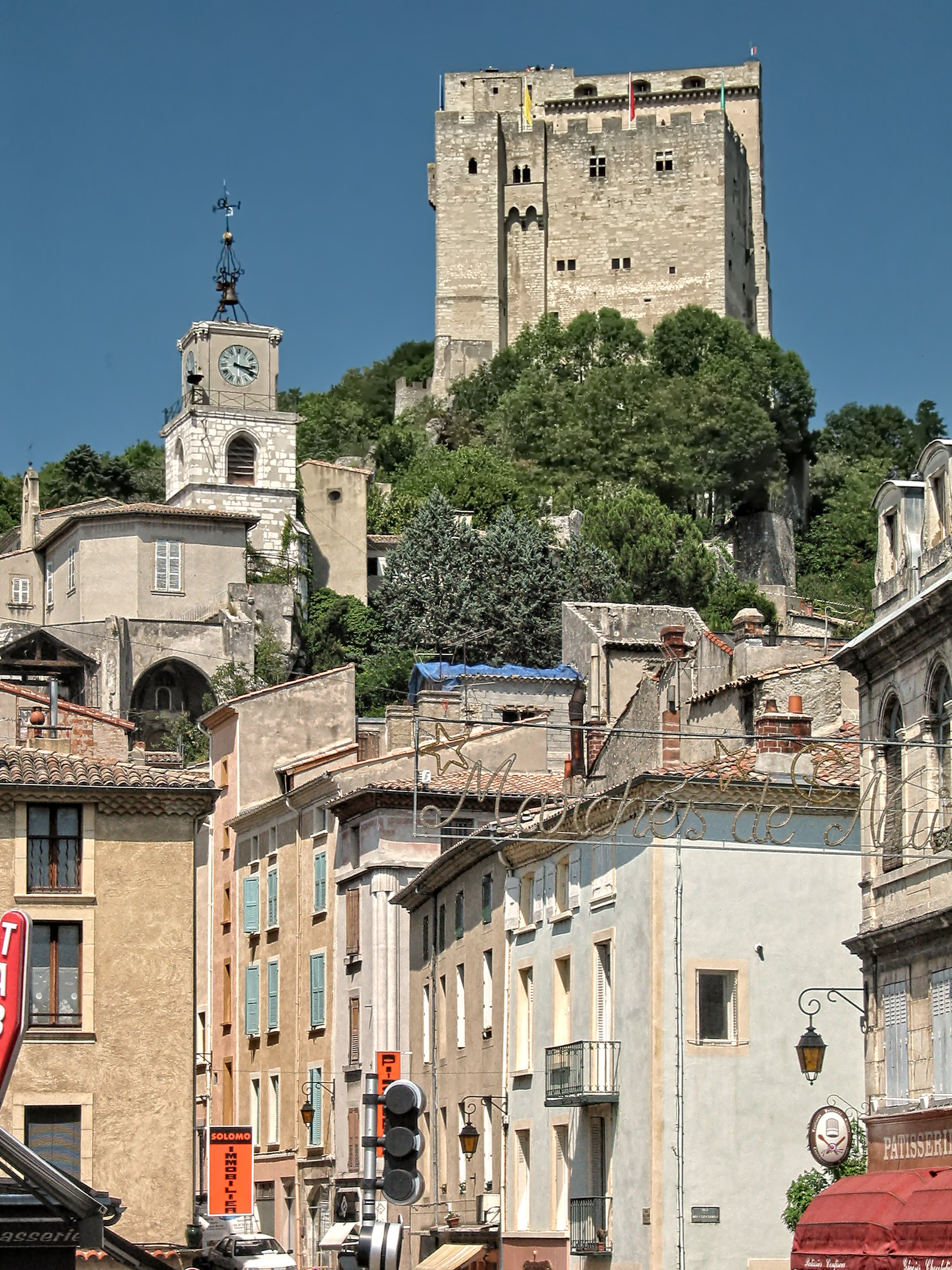
The town and the keep

== See also ==
- List of castles in France

== Bibliography ==
- Claude Huot, Jean-Claude Alcamo - "La tour de Crest : évolution architecturale et fonctionnelle" - pp. 69–90, dans Congrès archéologique de France - Moyenne vallée du Rhône - 150^{e} session - 1992 - Société Française d'Archéologie - 1995
