= The Catholic Register =

Canadian Catholic newspaper

- Type: Weekly newspaper
- Format: Tabloid
- Owner: Archdiocese of Toronto
- Editor: Mickey Conlon
- Founded: 1893
- Headquarters: Toronto, Ontario
- ISSN: 0383-1620
- Website: www.catholicregister.org

The Catholic Register is a Canadian weekly newspaper published by the Archdiocese of Toronto. Founded in 1893 by Fr. John R. Teefy, CSB, it is the oldest English-language Catholic publication in Canada. Based in Toronto, Ontario, and circulated nationally, it is published weekly in tabloid format, with 47 issues per year.

News coverage includes local, national and international church-related news (frequently reprinted from other Catholic news syndication services), plus features, opinion columns and editorials. Its Youth Speak News section gives Canadian youth a weekly voice in the newspaper.

The newspaper is distributed to more than 30,000 homes through subscription and to churches across Canada. It is also available to subscribers in digital format.
