= House of Providence =

Coordinates: 43.7126°N 79.2851°W

The House of Providence is a Roman Catholic charitable institution in the city of Toronto, Ontario, Canada that has been active since 1857. Commissioned by Armand-François-Marie de Charbonnel, the second Roman Catholic Bishop of Toronto, the institution provides help to "the needy, the immigrants, the old, the invalid, and destitute".

The House of Providence's original building on Power Street, just south of the St. Paul's Basilica, was for many years a landmark in the city of Toronto. Designed by architect William Hay, construction on the building began in 1855 and was completed in 1858. The organization began to use the building in 1857 after the majority of the construction was completed. In 1962 the building was demolished after an order from the city was given declaring the need for space for the Richmond Street ramp of the Don Valley Parkway to be built. At that time the ministry was relocated to its current location at Providence Villa and Hospital in Scarborough.

== Sources ==
- House of Providence at the Toronto Public Library
