= St. Joseph's College (Edmonton) =

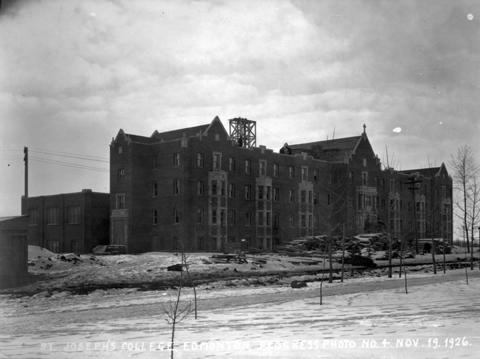
- St. Joseph's College, November 19, 1926
- Motto: Quaecumque Vera Doce Me (Teach Me Whatsoever Things Are True)
- Type: Public / Catholic
- Established: 1926
- President: Dr. Shawn W. Flynn
- Administrative staff: 19 (academic), 14 (administrative)
- Location: 11325 89 Avenue NW; Edmonton, Alberta; T6G 2J5; 53.524473°N 113.524652°W
- Campus: Urban
- Type: Affiliated college of the University of Alberta
- Website: www.ualberta.ca/st-josephs/index.html

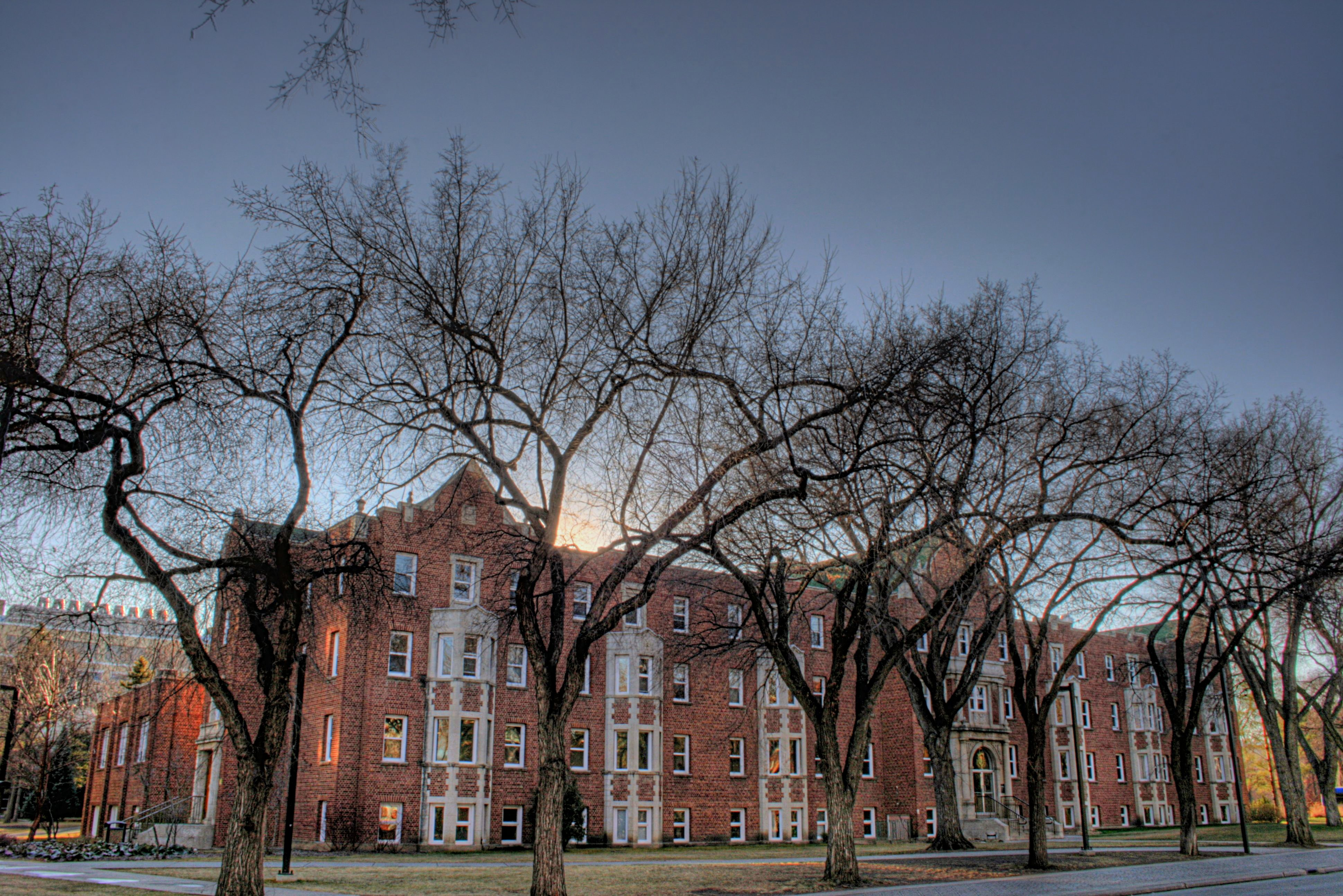
St. Joseph's College on the north campus of the University of Alberta.

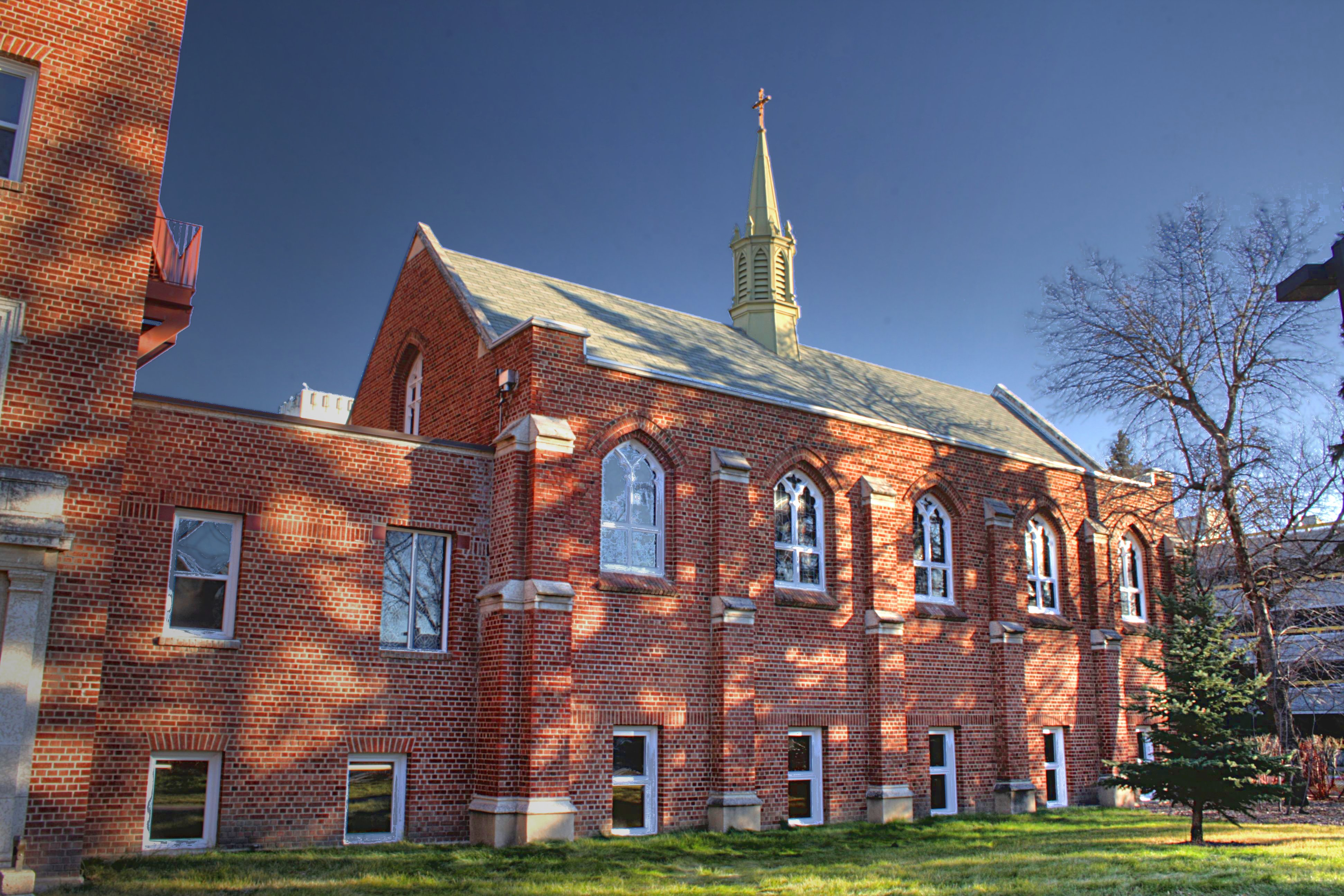
Chapel of St. Joseph's College.

St. Joseph's College is a Catholic, undergraduate, liberal arts college on the University of Alberta campus. It also serves as a residence and place of worship. It is affiliated with the University of Alberta and the Archdiocese of Edmonton, and is pastorally served by the Basilian Fathers. Its courses, residences, and campus ministry services are open to all University of Alberta students, and all of its courses are 3-credit University of Alberta Arts electives.

St. Joseph’s College provides academic programs and courses in the Liberal Arts which are supported and enhanced by a worshiping community, campus ministry programs, and residences for both male and female students. Though affiliated with the University of Alberta and the Catholic Church, it is open to all peoples and beliefs.

== Academics ==
St. Joseph’s College courses are all 3-credit University of Alberta Arts electives, serving 2000 yearly enrolments. Teaching and researching across the Liberal Arts, through 8 tenured faculty and supporting sessionals, SJC offers a B.A. Minor in Christian Theology, as well as a Certificate in Catholic Education. The College’s course topics include Christianity & Culture, History, Ethics, Religious Education, Scripture, Theology, Philosophy, and Experiential Learning. The College is also home to the Peter and Doris Kule Chair in Religious Education.

== Residence ==
St. Joseph’s College has both men’s and women’s residences that are open to all University of Alberta students, regardless of their cultural, spiritual, or academic backgrounds, for 63 men and 284 women.

The men’s residence, founded in 1926, accommodates 63 students, and offers private, fully furnished bedrooms, a full meal plan at the College’s cafeteria, and common study areas. Known for being a unique and close-knit community, the St. Joe’s Rangers participate actively in the University of Alberta campus intramural programs and have a long history of winning championship titles. Notable residents include former Prime Minister of Canada, Joe Clark.

The St. Joseph’s College Women’s Residence was founded in 2006. Called Kateri House, after the First Nations Catholic Saint, St. Kateri Tekakwitha, the residence recently expanded to accommodate 284 female students. Its building has 24 hour security, fully furnished 1, 2 & 4 bedroom suites, an optional lunch meal plan shared with the men's residence and common study areas. The Kateri Islanders also participate in the University of Alberta campus intramurals.

== Chapel ==
The St. Joseph’s College Chapel provides mass on Saturday evening, both Sundays and weekdays to nearly 300 people weekly. Its Sunday masses include a thriving children’s liturgy program and music ministry. It offers the Sacrament of Reconciliation on Tuesdays from 11:30-12:00, or by appointment.
