= Student Volunteer Campus Community =

Non-profit Organization

The Student Volunteer Campus Community (SVCC)
- Company type: Non profit organization
- Founded: 1980 in Edmonton, Alberta, Canada
- Founder: Father Firth and Rita Chow
- Headquarters: Edmonton, Alberta, Canada
- Key people: Father Firth: Founder and former Advisor; Rita Chow: Founder and former President

Student Volunteer Campus Community (abbreviated SVCC, and formerly SVCC Language Schools) is a non-profit organization run by volunteers located in Edmonton, Alberta, Canada and operates at the University of Alberta as a student volunteer group.

== History ==
Originally located at St. Joseph's College on the campus of The University of Alberta, operations moved to the Education Building in 1984 to facilitate expansion of the "Cantonese Language Group"

SVCC Language Schools was founded in 1980 under the name "Student Volunteer Campus Community," by the late Father Firth and Rita Chow. Originally, SVCC was an English Language School intended for new immigrants from Vietnam and the Orient learning English as a second language.

Those English as a Second Language classes were held at St. Joseph's College, a small college also located on the University of Alberta Campus. When the English Language Group hosted five classes, SVCC relocated to the Education Building on the University Campus, where it continues to operate today.

In 1984, SVCC opened their second language program as the "Cantonese Language Group" for children.

As time went on, SVCC became more well known as its popularity came with the establishment of a Mandarin Language Group (2005), French Language Group (2007), Japanese Language Group (2008) and Korean Language Group (2009), and most recently, a Spanish program in 2013

In the Fall semester of 2013, SVCC marked its 100th session in operation.

== Basic structure ==
SVCC Language Schools comprises six language schools as well as three operational departments listed as the following:

- Operations (Internal Department)
- Finance
- Marketing (External Department)
- English Language Group
- Cantonese Language Group
- Mandarin Language Group
- French Language Group
- Japanese Language Group
- Korean Language Group
- Spanish Language Group

== Mission statement ==
The objectives of SVCC are:

- To provide participants with an opportunity to experience language in a discussion-like setting
- To integrate volunteer activities as a part of everyday student life at the University
- To develop cooperative learning between participants through peer-education
- To introduce members of the international community to Canadian culture through language education
- To promote multiculturalism and the respect of the variety of cultures in Canada
