= M. Owen Lee =

American music scholar (1930–2019)

- Born: May 28, 1930; Detroit, Michigan, US
- Died: July 25, 2019 (aged 89); Scarborough, Toronto, Ontario, Canada

Academic background
- Education: University of British Columbia

Academic work
- Discipline: classics music
- Institutions: University of Toronto
- Main interests: opera Richard Wagner

Mark Owen Lee, also known as M. Owen Lee and Father Owen Lee (May 28, 1930 – July 25, 2019), was an American-Canadian classics and music scholar and Roman Catholic priest.

Lee was born in Detroit, Michigan, United States, on May 28, 1930, to Robert Leo Lee and Helen (née Miller) Lee.

Father Lee was a member of the Basilian Fathers (C.S.B.) from 1951. He was the first person to be awarded a PhD in classics at the University of British Columbia (in 1960), a professor emeritus of classics at the University of Toronto, a holder of four honorary degrees, and an author of more than 20 books on various subjects, such as opera, Richard Wagner, and Der Ring des Nibelungen.

Lee was also active as a commentator on musical topics. He was especially well known for his many contributions as intermission commentator, pianist, and quiz panelist on the Metropolitan Opera radio broadcasts.

Lee died in Scarborough, Toronto, Ontario, Canada, on July 25, 2019, at the age of 89.

== Major writings ==
- Word, Sound, and Image in the Odes of Horace (University of Michigan Press, 1969)
- Fathers and Sons in Virgil's Aeneid (SUNY Press, 1979)
- Wagner's Ring: Turning the Sky Round (Summit Books, 1990)
- First Intermissions (Oxford University Press, 1995)
- The Olive-Tree Bed and Other Quests (University of Toronto Press, 1997)
- Wagner: The Terrible Man and his Truthful Art (University of Toronto Press, 1999)
- A Book of Hours (Continuum Press, 2004)
- The Great Instrumental Works (Amadeus Press, 2005)
- The Best Films of Our Years (Authorhouse, 2007) ISBN 978-1-4259-9620-8
- Athena Sings: Wagner and the Greeks (University of Toronto Press, 2003)
- Wagner and the Wonder of Art: An Introduction to Die Meistersinger (University of Toronto Press, 2007)
- A Season of Opera: From Orpheus to Ariadne (University of Toronto Press, 1998)
