= Crest, Drôme =

Commune in Auvergne-Rhône-Alpes, France

Crest
- Commune
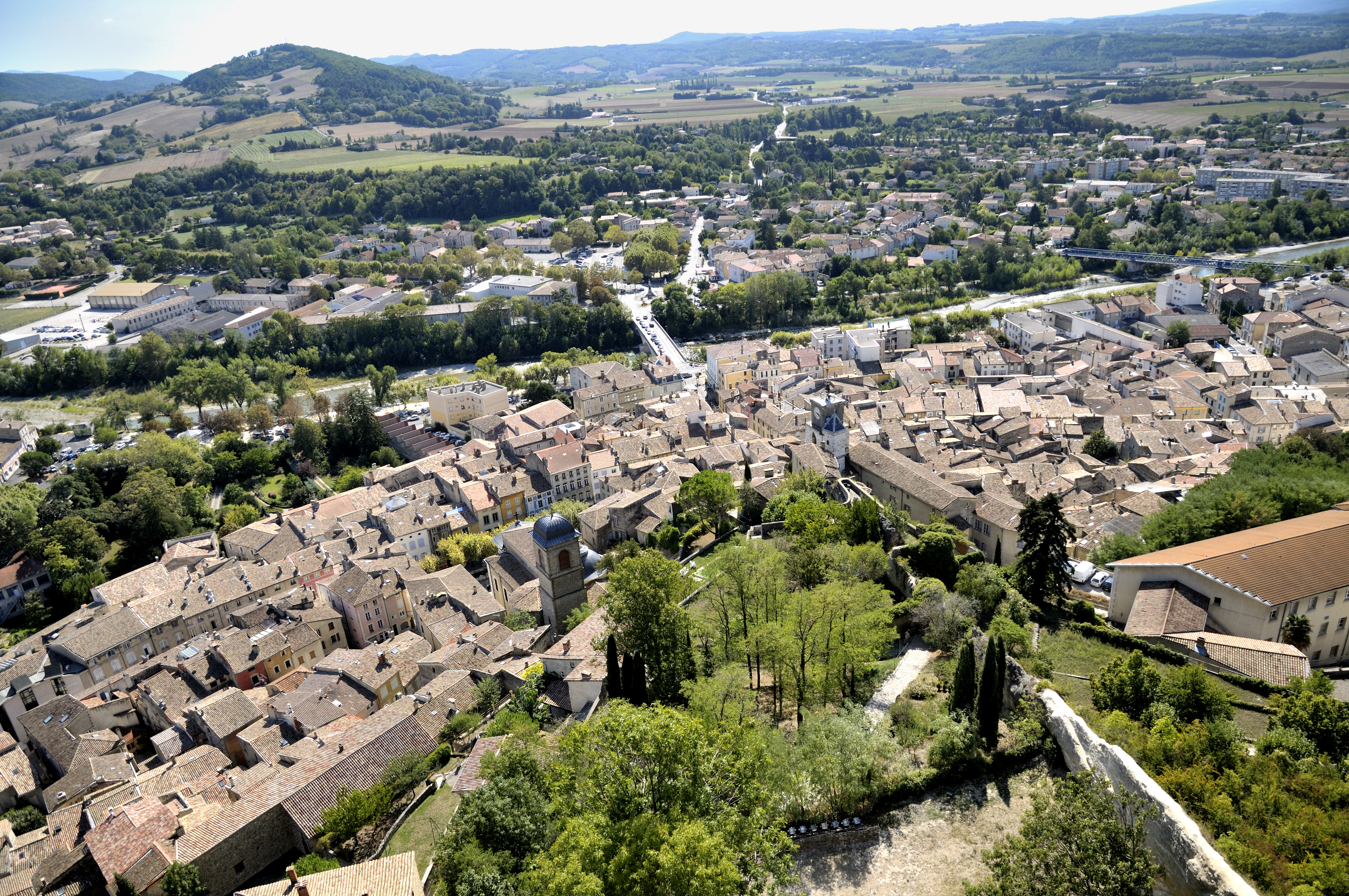
- The town seen from the tower

- Coat of arms
- Location of Crest
- Location within France Location within Auvergne-Rhône-Alpes
- Coordinates: 44°43′45″N 5°01′22″E
- Country: France
- Region: Auvergne-Rhône-Alpes
- Department: Drôme
- Arrondissement: Die
- Canton: Crest
- Intercommunality: Crestois et Pays de Saillans Cœur de Drôme

Government
  - Mayor (2024–2026): Stéphanie Karcher
- Area^{1}: 23.38 km^{2} (9.03 sq mi)
- Highest elevation: 463 m (1,519 ft)
- Lowest elevation: 166 m (545 ft)
- Population (2023): 8,658
  - Density: 370.3/km^{2} (959.1/sq mi)
- Time zone: UTC+01:00 (CET)
  - Summer (DST): UTC+02:00 (CEST)
- INSEE/Postal code: 26108 /26400
- ^{1} French Land Register data, which excludes lakes, ponds, glaciers > 1 km^{2} (0.386 sq mi or 247 acres) and river estuaries.

Crest (French pronunciation: [kʁɛ]) is a commune in the Drôme department in the Auvergne-Rhône-Alpes region of Southeastern France.

== Population ==
Its inhabitants are called Crestois in French.

Historical population

Year	Pop.	±% p.a.
1793	4,500	—
1800	4,500	+0.00%
1806	4,370	−0.49%
1821	4,335	−0.05%
1831	4,901	+1.23%
1836	4,983	+0.33%
1841	4,948	−0.14%
1846	5,079	+0.52%
1851	5,423	+1.32%
1856	5,110	−1.18%
1861	5,460	+1.33%
1866	5,351	−0.40%
1872	5,568	+0.66%
1876	5,600	+0.14%
1881	5,535	−0.23%
1886	5,669	+0.48%
1891	5,569	−0.36%
1896	5,582	+0.05%
1901	5,579	−0.01%

Year	Pop.	±% p.a.
1906	5,660	+0.29%
1911	5,536	−0.44%
1921	5,005	−1.00%
1926	5,250	+0.96%
1931	5,379	+0.49%
1936	5,513	+0.49%
1946	5,359	−0.28%
1954	5,773	+0.93%
1962	6,207	+0.91%
1968	7,140	+2.36%
1975	7,519	+0.74%
1982	7,518	−0.00%
1990	7,583	+0.11%
1999	7,739	+0.23%
2007	7,789	+0.08%
2012	8,095	+0.77%
2017	8,505	+0.99%
2023	8,658	+0.30%

Source: EHESS and INSEE (1968-2023)

== Sights ==
The Tour de Crest is one of the highest medieval keeps in France at 52 m. Its height dominates the town. The tower was part of a castle that guarded one of the entrances to the Pre-Alps in Drôme. The site offers a large panoramic view. There are various exhibitions in the castle plus information about the Tour's past, including the fact that it has served as a prison in the past.

The Tour has two spectacular carved wooden doors, one of which is believed to depict the original castle.

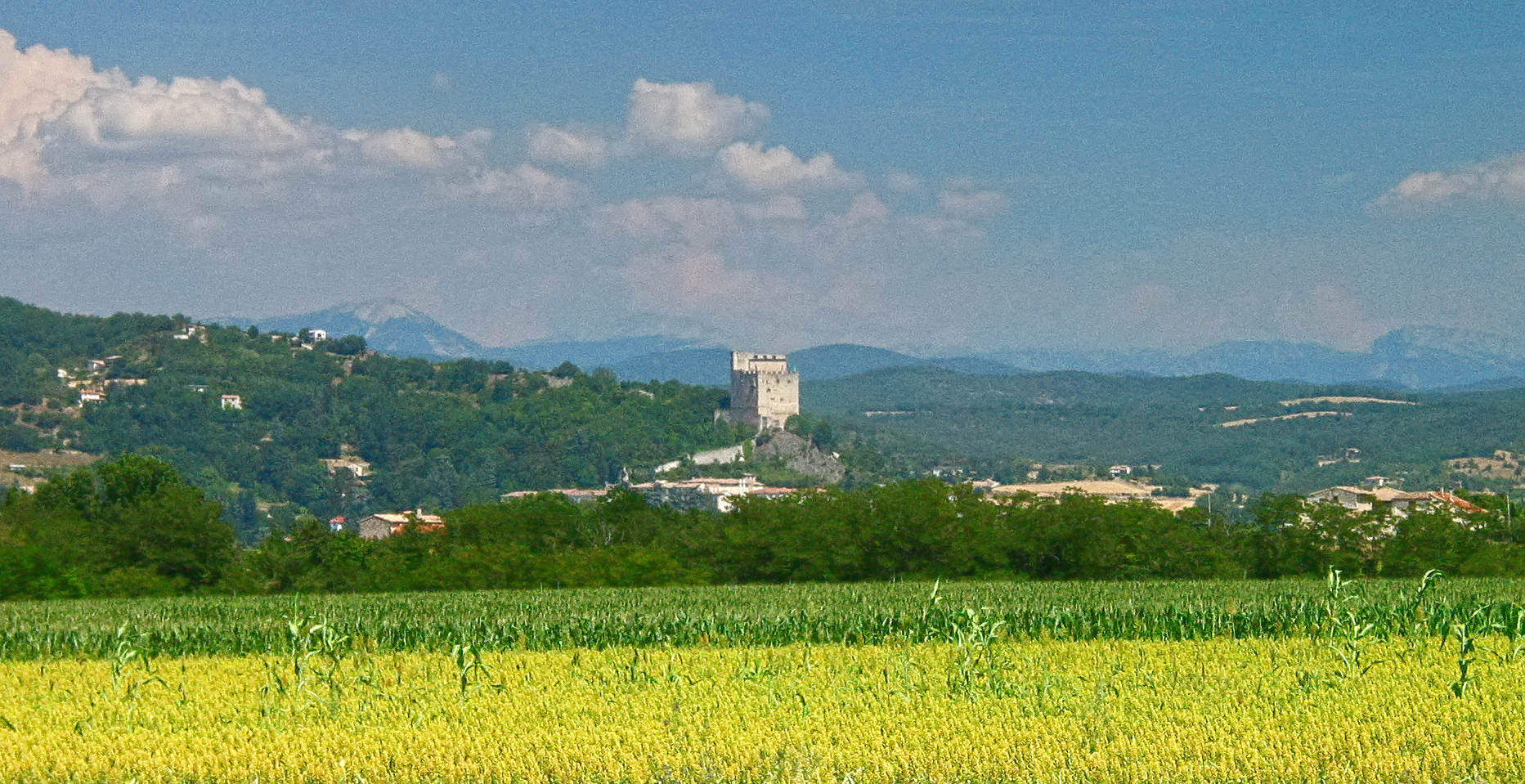

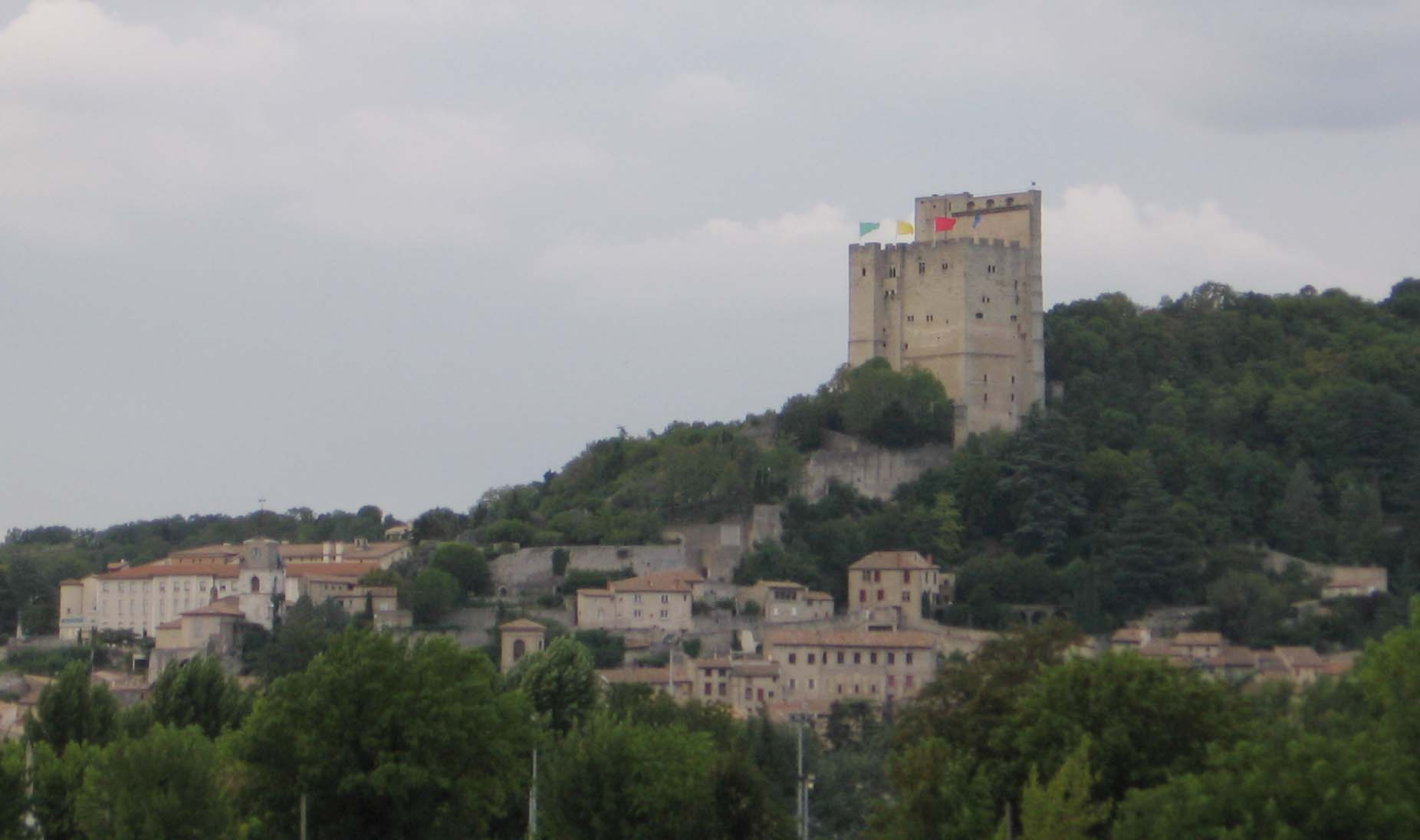

Saint-Sauveur Church

Monument to the resistance to the coup d'état of 2 December 1851 in Provence.

There is an artisanal chocolate manufacturer in the town with a chocolate museum attached. The museum has a model of the tour in chocolate and various scenes in the history of chocolate also created in chocolate.

The town is still substantially medieval with steep narrow lanes leading up to the Tour.

== Transport ==
Crest is served by Crest station, a railway station operated by SNCF, with TER connections to Valence and Briançon on the Livron to Aspres-sur-Buëch line.

== Twin towns ==
Crest is twinned with:

- Cromer in Norfolk, England,
- Nidda, Germany
- Ponte San Nicolò, Italy
- Medvode, Slovenia

== See also ==
- Communes of the Drôme department
- Parc naturel régional du Vercors
