= Armand-François-Marie de Charbonnel =

Catholic bishop (1802–1891)

Armand-François-Marie de Charbonnel OFM Cap
- Bishop of Toronto
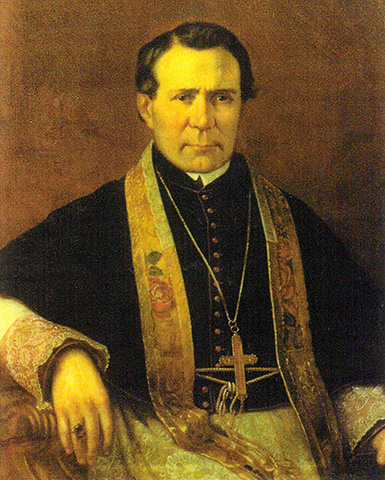
- Diocese: Toronto
- Installed: 21 September 1850
- Retired: 26 April 1860
- Predecessor: Michael Power
- Successor: John Joseph Lynch

Orders
- Ordination: 17 December 1825
- Consecration: 26 May 1850 by Pope Pius IX

Personal details
- Born: 1 December 1802 Château du Flachat, France
- Died: 29 March 1891 (aged 88) Crest, Drôme, France
- Buried: Capuchin Friary, Crest
- Denomination: Roman Catholic
- Education: St Michael's College, Toronto

Armand-François-Marie de Charbonnel OFM Cap (1 December 1802 – 29 March 1891) was the Bishop of Toronto from 1847 to 1860 and the only French and non-English priest to hold the post.

== Early years ==
Born in Château du Flachat, France he was the second son of Jean-Baptiste de Charbonnel, Comte de Charbonnel, and Marie-Claudine de Pradier. At the age of ten, he was sent to a school operated by the Basilian Fathers in Annonay. Despite his father's wish that he enter the military, at seventeen, he went to the Séminaire de Saint-Sulpice in Issy to study for the priesthood. He was ordained on 17 December 1825.

Charbonnel joined the Society of Saint-Sulpice in 1826 and became professor of dogmatic theology and scripture, teaching at Sulpician seminaries in Versailles, Bordeaux, Marseilles, and Lyons. Charbonnel's intervention during a workers' revolt in that Lyons in 1834 saved the city from destruction, but he would not accept the cross of the Legion of Honour for that action.

== Canada ==
Charbonnel repeatedly declined appointments as Vicar-General or coadjutor by the Bishops of Puiy, Autun, Limoges and Bordeaux as well as Superior of the Seminary of Grenoble. To avoid such appointments, he decided to undertake missionary work in North America and came to the Séminaire de Saint-Sulpice in Montreal late in 1839. There, he distinguished himself as a gifted preacher at large retreats before moving briefly to Baltimore, Maryland, about 1840 to study English.

From 1840 to 1847 Charbonnel served as vicar at the parish of Our Lady of Montreal, working among the Irish immigrants. When Governor General Sydenham suggested that he accept appointment to one of Britain's colonies, he responded, "If I wished to be a bishop, I would not have left France."

Charbonnel fell ill with typhus and was recalled to France to convalesce. When Charbonnel was fully recovered, he accepted the position of professor of Theology in the Seminary of Aix in Provence.

== Bishop ==
With the death of Bishop Michael Power of Toronto, the Canadian hierarchy asked the Propaganda in Rome to appoint Charbonnnel. Pope Pius IX consecrated him bishop in the Sistine Chapel on 26 May 1850. Bishop Charbonnel arrived in Toronto on 21 September 1850. He worked to give the diocese a stable pastoral and financial footing. An eloquent preacher, Bishop Charbonnel nonetheless never felt up to the responsibilities of bishop, because of the linguistic and cultural gap that existed between him and his flock.

Much of the Toronto diocese's debt was retired using money from his paternal estate in France. During his ten-year episcopate, he built twenty-three churches, organized the Society of St. Vincent de Paul and founded important institutions: hospitals, orphanages, homes for the elderly, and youth hostels. Bishop Charbonnel brought several religious communities to the diocese to look after education and social assistance, among others, the Christian Brothers, the Basilian Fathers, and the Sisters of St. Joseph.

In 1856, he obtained the erection of the dioceses of London and Hamilton from that of Toronto. Charbonnel spent 13 months in Europe in 1857 to 1858 to preach on behalf of the Propagation of the Faith.

== Return to France and death ==
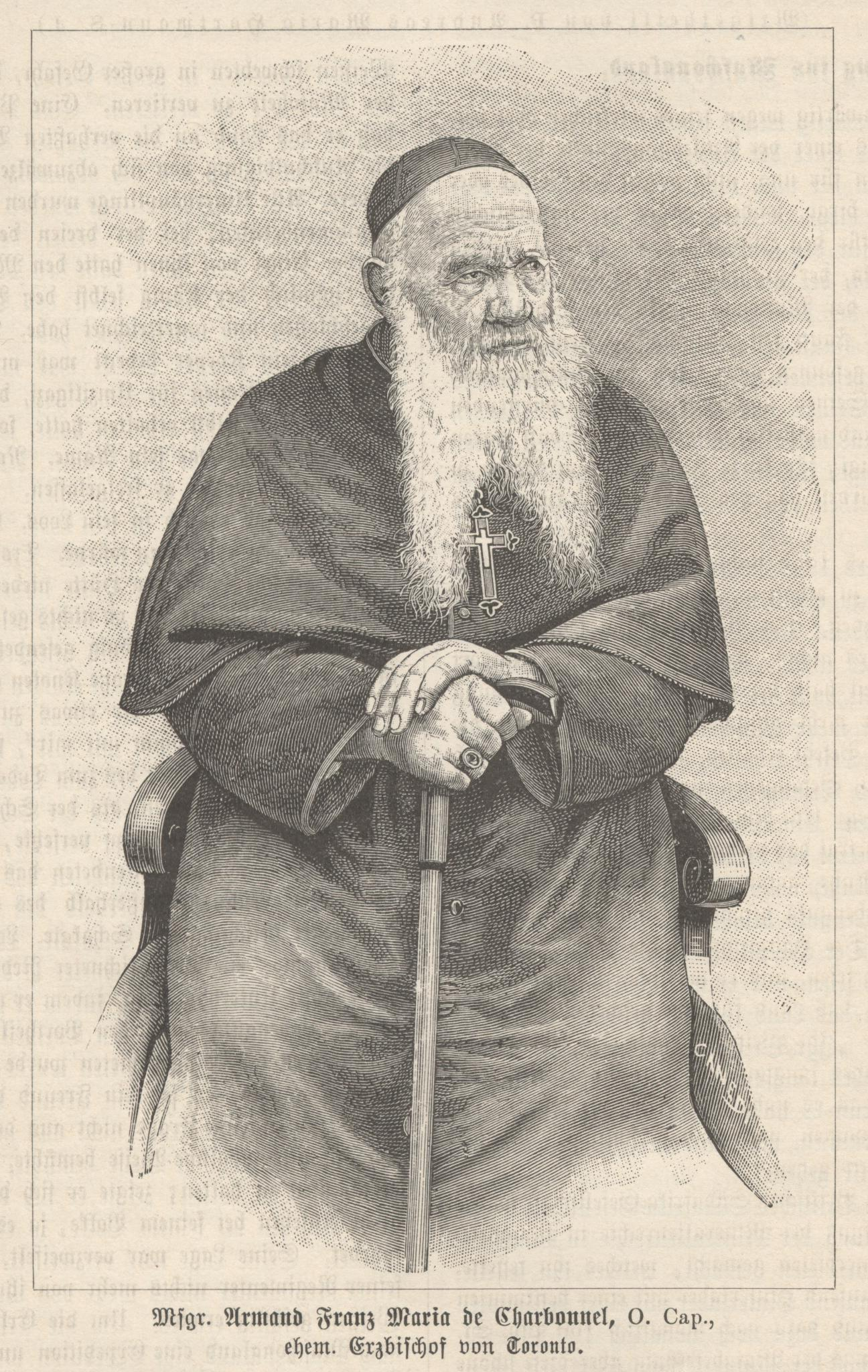
1892 engraving of Charbonnel published in German newspaper Die Katholischen Missionen

Carbonnel resigned on 26 April 1860 to return to France and enter the Capuchins, who sent him to the novitiate in Rieti. On 1 October 1869, he was made Titular Bishop of Sozopolis in Haemimonto and participated in the Vatican Council of 1869-1870. Charbonnel lived in Lyon, serving as an auxiliary to the archbishop of the city from 1869 to 1880. Crest in the diocese of Valencia, department of Drôme, In December 1883, he retired to the Capuchin friary in Crest, Drôme, where he died on 29 March 1891. Charbonnel was buried at the friary.

== Legacy ==
De Charbonnel left his legacy in Toronto through the establishment of St Michael's College under the Basilian Fathers and other institutions including:

- House of Providence - a shelter for the sick, aged and orphaned
- St Vincent de Paul Society of Toronto
- Established the Toronto Savings Bank, predecessor to the Home Bank of Canada
- A French-language Toronto high school bears his name today, the École secondaire catholique Monseigneur-de-Charbonnel.

Religious titles
Preceded by Michael Power	Bishop of Toronto; 1850–1860	Succeeded by John Joseph Lynch
