= Congregation of St. Basil =

Catholic clerical religious congregation

- Congregatio a Sancto Basilio
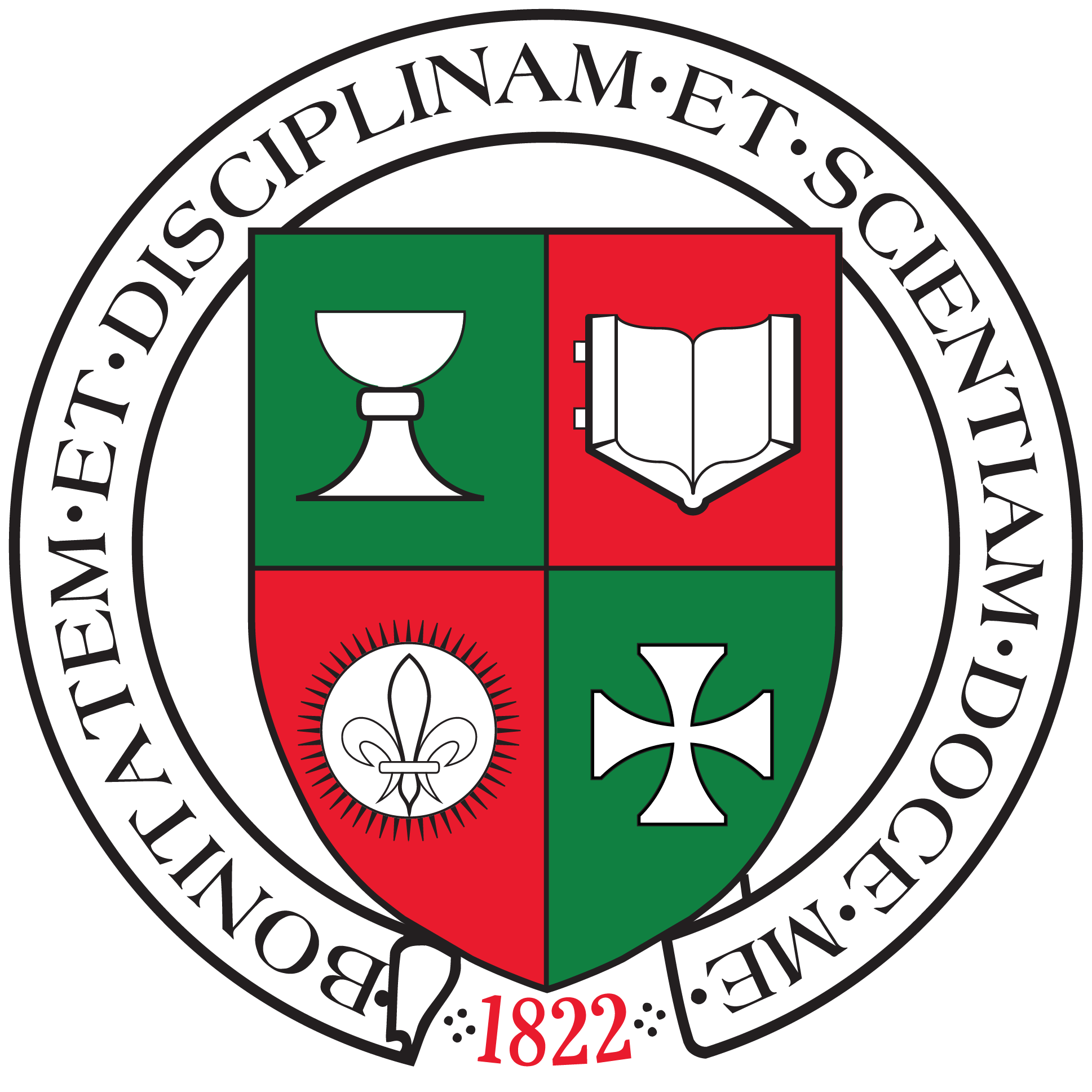
- Abbreviation: CSB
- Nickname: Basilians
- Formation: November 21, 1822; 203 years ago
- Founders: List: Fr. Joseph Bovier Lapierre, C.S.B.; Fr. Pierre Tourvieille, C.S.B.; Fr. Jacques Vincent Duret, C.S.B.; Fr. André Fayolle, C.S.B.; Fr. Henri Martinesche, C.S.B.; Fr. Jean-François Pagès, C.S.B.; Fr. Augustin Payan, C.S.B.; Fr. Jean-Baptiste Polly, C.S.B.; Fr. Julien Tracol, C.S.B.; Fr. Jean-Antoine Vallon, C.S.B.
- Founded at: Annonay, France
- Type: Clerical religious congregation of pontifical right for men
- Headquarters: 360 Davenport Rd, Toronto, Canada
- Region served: North America
- Members: 139 members (includes 119 priests) as of 2020
- Motto: Latin: Bonitatem et disciplinam et scientiam doce me English: Teach me goodness, discipline, and knowledge
- Superior-general: Fr. Kevin J. Storey, C.S.B.
- Patron saints: List: Blessed Virgin Mary; St. Joseph; Saint Basil of Caesarea; St. Francis of Assisi; St. Thomas Aquinas; St. John Bosco
- Ministry: Educational and parochial works
- Website: basilian.org
- Formerly called: Teaching Priests of the Ardèche

The Congregation of St. Basil (Latin: Congregatio a Sancto Basilio, abbreviation CSB), also called the Basilians, is a Catholic clerical religious congregation of pontifical right for men, with priests, seminarians and lay associates. It is an apostolic community whose members profess simple vows. The Basilians work in education and evangelization. The congregation was founded in 1822 in the aftermath of the French Revolution. In the early 19th century, the Basilians' educational and pastoral work brought them to a variety of locations in Canada and the United States. In the 1960s, the priests began to minister in Mexico, and in Colombia in the 1980s.

== History ==
=== Founding ===
Amid the turmoil and persecution of the Catholic Church during the French Revolution and after the Reign of Terror, the Archbishop of Vienne, Charles-François d’Aviau Du Bois-de-Sanzay, encouraged Joseph Lapierre to take over the Catholic education of boys in the isolated hill commune of Saint-Symphorien-de-Mahun, Ardèche department. Despite difficulties, the school grew, and in 1800, when the political climate was more favourable, the archbishop asked Lapierre to also educate candidates for the priesthood. With the addition of Joseph Marie Actorie as director, a minor seminary was founded. Increased growth made it necessary to find a new location, and in 1802 the school moved to Annonay in southern France at the suggestion of Henri Léorat-Picansel, a pastor who had previously been in Saint-Symphorien-de-Mahun.

Early Basilian teachers

Ten men, priests and students for the priesthood, formed the staff of the school. In the ensuing years, school enrollment grew to over 300 students, and auxiliary institutions were established nearby. In the years leading up to 1820, changing French educational laws and changing church administration meant falling enrollment. The newly appointed bishop suggested that if they formed an association and bought the property of a nearby school, Maisonseule, that they would have his support. This “coincided with a desire for closer religious life already shown by several of the priests teaching in the college.” Around 1820, Abbot Bernardin Fustier purchased the Chateau de Maisonseule.

On November 21, 1822, the Feast of the Presentation of Our Lady, the congregation's first general chapter was held. Joseph Lapierre was unanimously elected superior by the nine other priests. “To these men he was the very symbol of their determination that this work should not fail.” The schools became known for their range of teaching including humanities, rhetoric, philosophy, mathematics, physics and chemistry.

Previously known as the Teaching Priests of the Ardèche, the founders chose St. Basil as their namesake. Their new school, Maisonseule, was in the Parish of St. Basil, but he was also an appropriate choice because he was “a monastic founder, a preacher and an author of a treatise on the study of pagan classics.”

Other patrons of the Basilians are the Blessed Virgin Mary, Saint Joseph, Saint Francis of Assisi, Saint Thomas Aquinas, and Saint John Bosco.

The ten founding priests were:

- Joseph Lapierre (1757–1838) was the first Superior General of the Congregation. He prepared and submitted the first draft Constitutions of the Basilians to Rome. He was a priest who fled persecution during the Revolution and secretly celebrated Mass and provided clandestine Christian education.
- Pierre Tourvieille (1780–1859) was the second Basilian Superior General elected in 1838. He received covert education during the French Revolution from his older brother, a priest.
- Jacques Duret (1762–1841) was born in Annonay, the son of a physician. He studied in Paris and was a classmate of the revolutionary enemy of the Catholic Church, Maximilien Robespierre.
- Henri Martinesche (1797–1879) was ordained in 1822 and was a teacher and chaplain.
- Jean François Pagès (1793–1861) studied philosophy and theology and was ordained in 1818. The following year, he began teaching in Annonay.
- Augustin Payan (1771–1847) attended the clandestine seminary college at Saint-Symphorien-de-Mahun, becoming a teacher and studying theology.
- Jean-Baptiste Polly (1772–1846) was mayor of Saint-Symphorien-de-Mahun (then called Mahun Libre by the revolutionaries) and hid priests to protect them. He attended the clandestine seminary college where he studied theology, and was secretly ordained.
- Julien Tracol (1796–1885) was a teacher, librarian, record keeper and first unofficial historian of the Congregation of St. Basil.
- Jean Antoine Vallon (1775–1840) was ordained around 1800 and was a teacher at Saint-Symphorien-de-Mahun and later at Annonay.
- André Fayolle, (1791–1867) nephew of Pierre Tourvieille, was a teacher who studied theology before he was ordained.
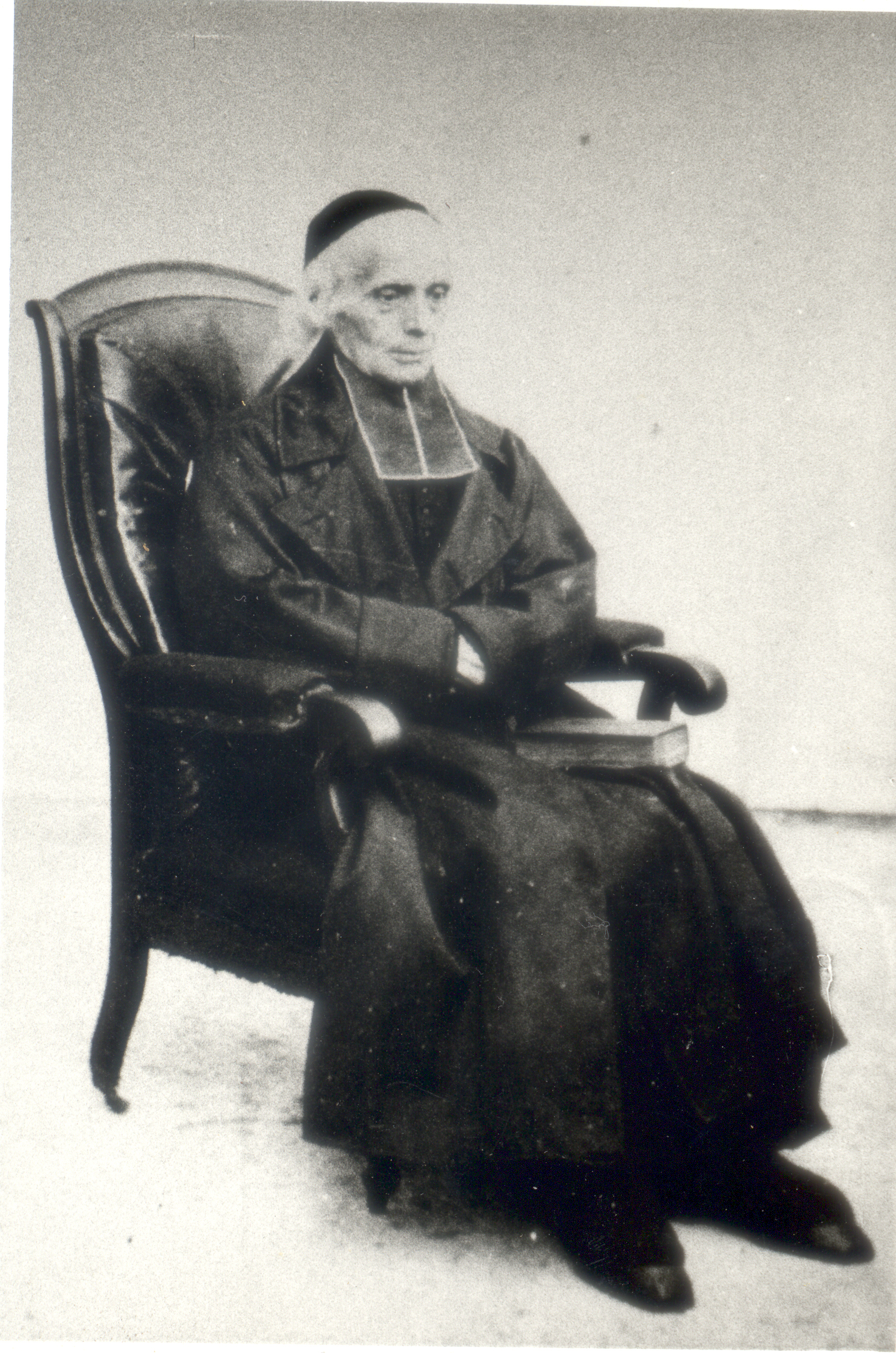
André Fayolle

=== France ===
In their early years, the Basilians were not a religious congregation in the canonical sense. They were an association or society of secular priests willing to live in community and pool their resources to support Christian education and preaching. The members did not take formal religious vows of poverty, chastity and obedience until later. In the early years, boundaries were somewhat fluid on membership in the association, based on who lived in the community and taught at the schools at any time.

The early years of the Basilian congregation were full of challenges. The local bishop, who was prepared to suppress the congregation, died the night before signing a decree. However within a couple of generations, the Basilians had grown sufficiently to be formally approved by Pius IX in 1863. During the French Third Republic, Catholic schools were again a target, this time of the Socialists who were determined to secularize education. The decrees of 1880 targeted Jesuits but affected all teaching orders including the Basilians, and as a result of the persecution they were forced to close one of their schools in 1881 and one of their houses.

The French government finally suppressed all religious orders in what was known as “La loi de Combes” in 1905. The Basilian confrères were dispersed and their property was sold at auction. The religious life of the Basilian Fathers in France was suspended for twenty years, a blow from which they never recovered.

=== Canada ===
The Basilians first came to Canada in 1850 at the invitation of Bishop Armand-François-Marie de Charbonnel. As a Basilian student in Annonay from 1811 to 1819, the Bishop of Toronto turned to his former teacher and Irish Basilian, Father Patrick Molony, to assist him in his work with the largely Irish Catholic community in Toronto. Eventually, the Congregation sent four of its members to the New World. In 1852, St. Michael's College, Toronto opened its doors, offering a French style of education, a combination of high-school and university education. This effort was a large investment, risk and sacrifice as it represented a significant percentage of the total number of available Basilian priests. In ensuing years, more sacrifices were made in manpower and money to continue the mission foundations in Canada; their work took them to Sandwich in 1856 and Owen Sound in 1863. Three high schools were served by the Basilian order in Toronto including St. Michael's College School, Bishop Michael Power High School, and Father Henry Carr Catholic Secondary School. The institute also founded Assumption College School, which became Assumption University in Windsor, Ontario, now federated with the University of Windsor; St. Thomas More College in Saskatoon, Saskatchewan federated with the University of Saskatchewan; and St. Joseph's College in Edmonton, Alberta affiliated with the University of Alberta. St. Thomas College (later St. Thomas University (New Brunswick) in Chatham, New Brunswick, was founded by the Basilians in 1910, and in 1923 the college was transferred to the local diocesan clergy. Toronto remains one of the largest centers for the Congregation and is home to the Basilian Curial Offices and the Cardinal Flahiff Basilian Centre.

On April 30, 2020, the Canadian Supreme Court rejected an appeal from the Basilian Fathers of Toronto to deny a $2.6 million settlement to sex abuse victim Rod MacLeod.

=== Division and reunion ===
Discussion between the congregation in France and North America resulted in the amicable decree of separation in June 1922 creating two separate religious congregations, each with their own constitutions.

The French and North American branches were reunited in 1955, an occasion celebrated in Annonay.

=== United States ===
The Basilian Fathers have been active in the United States since the last half of the nineteenth century. The first Basilian ministry in the United States was in Louisville, Ohio at St. Louis College in 1867. The Basilians founded and still operate St. Thomas High School and the University of St. Thomas (Texas). In the 1930s the Basilians began an apostolate serving Spanish-speaking populations in Texas in communities such as Galveston, Houston, Sugar Land, Rosenberg, Wharton, New Gulf, Bay City, Angleton, Freeport and Eagle Lake. The work in Texas also served as the platform for Basilian mission work in Mexico and Colombia.

The Basilians also opened Detroit Catholic Central High School in 1928 and Andrean High School in Merrillville, Indiana. They co-sponsor Detroit Cristo Rey High School with the Sisters, Servants of the Immaculate Heart of Mary.

In 1937, the Basilians took over The Aquinas Institute of Rochester in Rochester, New York, and in 1948 established St. John Fisher College in the same city. The Basilians are no longer a sponsor, but maintain strong links to both The Aquinas Institute and St. John Fisher University (renamed in 2022).

=== Latin America ===
The Basilians started missions to Mexico in 1961 and Colombia in 1987. The Basilian Fathers have served in Mexico City and currently serve in Tehuacán, Puebla, Mexico; and Bogotá, Cali, and Medellín, Colombia. The congregation established parishes and schools in Colombia and Mexico, and is affiliated with St. Basil's Medical Centre in Colombia.

== Present ==
Today, the Basilians practice their ministry of teaching and preaching within parishes, campus ministry, schools, and colleges located in Canada, United States, Mexico, and Colombia. They are currently located at:

- In France, Basilians still serve at Collège Privé Sacré-Coeur and in parishes in and around Annonay.
- In Canada, Basilians serve at St. Michael's College School, and St. Basil's Catholic Parish, the University of St. Michael's College, and the Pontifical Institute of Medieval Studies in Toronto; Assumption College and Assumption Parish in Windsor; and St. Joseph's College and St. Alphonsus and St. Clare parishes in Edmonton.
- In the United States, Basilians serve at Catholic Central and Cristo Rey high schools in Detroit; The Aquinas Institute of Rochester and St. John Fisher University in Rochester; St. Thomas High School, the University of St. Thomas, and St. Anne's Parish in Houston; and Most Holy Trinity Church in Angleton.
- In Mexico, Basilians serve at Casa San Felipe and Parroquia San Lorenzo in Tehuacán.
- In Colombia, Basilians serve at the parish and school Nuestra Señora de la Asunción in Cali; and Parroquia San Basilio in Medellín.
- As well, there are Basilians engaged in Christian education, pastoral care, and media ministry in Canada and the US.
- The Basilians have novitiate houses in Sugar Land, Texas and Bogotá, Colombia.
- The Basilians have scholasticate (residences for Basilian seminarians) in Houston, Texas; Tlalpan, Mexico; and Medellín, Colombia.
- The Basilians have residences for retired priests in Toronto, Ontario; Las Cruces, New Mexico; Rochester, New York; and Houston, Texas.

== Formation ==
The Basilian formation process consists of four basic steps that occur over a period of approximately seven years:

1. Associate: This stage gives a candidate the opportunity to get to know the Basilians and allows the Basilians to get to know him. It can occur while a candidate is in high school, college, or working. Generally, most associates spend their last associate year living in a Basilian community, thus indicating a stronger desire to commit to the Basilian way of life.
2. Novice: This stage marks another important step of a person's journey into religious life. The novitiate lasts for one year and a day, as prescribed by canon law. It is a year away from friends, family, work, and most things familiar to our everyday life so that the novice may build a strong foundation of prayer and spirituality for the rest of his life as a Basilian. At the end of this year, the novice may profess first (temporary) vows.
3. Scholastic: At this stage the candidate is living in temporary vows and engaged in three to four years of theological study. Alongside their theological studies, scholastics are engaged in various pastoral ministries during the year and often travel on assignment each summer. These ministries and assignments are tailored to the individual's interests and capabilities.
4. Supervised Ministry: The Basilians consider the first year of ordination an important stage in the formation process as it is often the most challenging period for new deacons and priests. This serves as an adjustment period to the work of the priesthood in a Basilian apostolate.

== Coat of Arms ==
The Basilian coat of arms was developed in the late 19th century. Its main components are the founding date of the congregation (1822); the congregation's motto in Latin; and a shield bearing four symbols. The four symbols and their meanings are: a chalice, representing the Blessed Sacrament; an open book, representing knowledge; a fleur-de-lis representing both the Blessed Virgin and the French origins of the Basilians; and a Greek cross, representing Christ and honoring St. Basil, the Greek patron of the congregation. The motto, which is translated as "teach me goodness, discipline, and knowledge", is often seen on the logos of Basilian schools around the world.

== Superiors general ==
1. Fr. Joseph B. Lapierre (1822–1838)
2. Fr. Pierre Tourvielle (1838–1859)
3. Fr. Julien Actorie (1859–1864)
4. Fr. Jean-Mathieu Soulerin (1865–1879)
5. Fr. Adrien Fayolle (1879–1898)
6. Fr. Noel Durand (1898–1910)
7. Fr. Victorin Marijon (1910–1914)
8. Fr. James Frederick Players (1914–1922)
9. Fr. Robert Francis Forster (1922–1929)
10. Fr. Henry Carr (1930–1942)
11. Fr. Edmund J. McCorkell (1942–1954)
12. Cardinal George Bernard Flahiff (1954–1961)
13. Fr. Joseph Charles Wey (1961–1973)
14. Fr. Thomas James Hanrahan (1973–1981)
15. Fr. Ulysse Ernest Pare (1981–1989)
16. Fr. John Gallagher (1989-1993)
17. Fr. Robert Joseph Barringer (1993–1997)
18. Bishop Ronald Peter Fabbro (1997–2002)
19. Fr. Kenneth John Decker (2002–2010)
20. Fr. George Terence Smith (2010–2018)
21. Fr. Kevin J. Storey (2018–present)

== Notable Basilians ==
- David Bauer, Canadian amateur hockey advocate and Olympic hockey coach
- Henry Carr, made significant contributions to Catholic education in Canada including broadening the curriculum at St. Michael's College's high school department so its graduates could qualify for admission to university and arranging for St. Michael's College to become a federated arts college in the university, a model that was copied by other Catholic institutions in English-speaking Canada.
- Ronald Peter Fabbro, Bishop of London, Ontario, 2002–present
- George Bernard Flahiff, Archbishop of Winnipeg, 1961–1982
- Eugene Carlisle LeBel, influential administrator of Assumption College, Windsor, and later University of Windsor.
- M. Owen Lee, American classics and music scholar, who was well known for his contributions as an intermission commentator, pianist, and quiz panelist on the Metropolitan Opera radio broadcasts.
- Ulysse Paré, Superior General of the Congregation from 1981 to 1989, under his leadership the Basilians expanded their ministry to Colombia.
- John Michael Miller, Coadjutor Archbishop of Vancouver, 2007–2009 and Archbishop of Vancouver, 2009–Present
- Denis T. O'Connor, Bishop of London, Ontario, 1890–1899 and Archbishop of Toronto, 1899–1908
- Ricardo Ramírez, Auxiliary Bishop of San Antonio, Texas, 1981–1982 and Bishop of Las Cruces, New Mexico, 1982–2013
- Thomas Rosica, CEO of the Salt + Light Television network
- Jean-Mathieu Soulerin, Superior of the Basilian Order and founder of the University of St. Michael's College
- Charles Vincent, early administrator of the University of St. Michael's College

== Basilian educational institutions ==
=== Higher education ===
- University of St. Michael's College, a federated college of the University of Toronto, Toronto, Ontario, Canada (1852)
- Assumption University, a federated college of the University of Windsor, Windsor, Ontario, Canada (1870)
- St. Joseph's College, a federated college of the University of Alberta, Edmonton, Alberta, Canada (1926)
- St. Thomas More College, a federated college of the University of Saskatchewan, Saskatoon, Saskatchewan, Canada (1936)
- University of St. Thomas, Houston, Texas, United States (1947)

=== Secondary education ===
- Collège Privé Sacré-Coeur, Annonay, France (1822)
- St. Michael's College School, Toronto, Ontario, Canada (1852)
- Assumption College School, Windsor, Ontario, Canada (1870)
- St. Thomas High School, Houston, Texas, United States (1900)
- The Aquinas Institute of Rochester, Rochester, New York, United States (1902)
- Detroit Catholic Central High School, Detroit, Michigan, United States (1928)
- Michael Power-St. Joseph High School, Toronto, Ontario, Canada (1957)
- Andrean High School, Merrillville, Indiana, United States (1959)
- Father Henry Carr Catholic Secondary School, Toronto, Ontario, Canada (1974)
- Father John Redmond Catholic Secondary School and Regional Arts Centre (1986)
- Detroit Cristo Rey High School, Detroit, Michigan, United States (2008)

=== Former schools ===
- Saint Louis College, Louisville, Ohio, United States (Founded 1866, closed 1873).
- St. Thomas University, Fredericton, New Brunswick, Canada (Founded in 1910, transferred to the Diocese of Chatham in 1923).
- St. John Fisher University, Rochester, New York, United States (Founded in 1948, transferred to the Diocese of Rochester in 1968).

== Notes ==
1.Assumption University was founded by the Society of Jesus in 1852, but has been administered by the Basilians since 1870.
2.Co-founded with the Sisters, Servants of the Immaculate Heart of Mary.
