= Bond Street (disambiguation) =

Bond Street is a major shopping street in the West End of London.

Bond Street may also refer to:

== Places and structures ==
- Bond Street (Manhattan), a street in New York City, US
- Bond Street (Toronto), a street in Toronto, Ontario, Canada
- Bond Street Centre, now Trinity Leeds, a shopping and leisure centre in Leeds, England
- Bond Street Historic District, Augusta, Maine, US
- Bond Street station, a London Underground and Elizabeth line station

== Other uses ==
- Bond Street (cigarette), a brand of cigarette
- Bond Street (film), a 1948 British film
- Bond Street Theatre, a New York City-based international theatre project
- "Bond Street", a 1967 song by Burt Bacharach from Reach Out
