= Anisa Wahab =

Afghan actor and singer (1957-2010)

- Born: 1956; Kabul, Afghanistan
- Died: April 2010 (aged 53–54)
- Occupation(s): Actor; Singer
- Years active: 1963–2010

Anisa Wahab (Dari: انیسه وهاب; 1957–2010) was an Afghan actress and singer. Her theatre career started when she was a child. She co-founded Theatre Exile in Pakistan and performed internationally until her death.

== Life and work ==
Anisa Wahab was born in Kabul, Afghanistan in 1957. She began acting as a child, performing on Afghan television. In 1963, Wahab's father had her audition for the role of a boy on an Afghan TV show, which became her first acting role. She taught children singing from 1973 until 1982 at the local Pioneers Palace in Kabul. She performed at Mazar Theater for two years in the 1990s. She also acted in soap operas produced by the BBC.

As an adult, she performed on stage, television and in films in Afghanistan until 1992 when she went into exile. When the Taliban took over Afghanistan, Wahab moved to Peshawar, Pakistan. While there, she performed in projects for the BBC and also became involved in programs supporting child rights. She co-founded Theatre Exile in Pakistan, a theater company created by exiled Afghan performers. With Theatre Exile, she performed in Beyond the Mirror, a play written in partnership with New York's Bond Street Theatre. It was the first collaboration between Afghan and American theatres.

Eventually, she returned to Kabul. In 2004, Wahab performed in a United Nations sponsored production to bring awareness to HIV/AIDS in Afghanistan. She was an spokesperson for UNICEF.

Wahab played tabla and tambur.
