= Hong Kong historiography =

Hong Kong historiography refers to an approach that views the history of Hong Kong from a Hong Kong-centered standpoint. It stands alongside the colonial historiography and nationalist historiography as one of the three main perspectives for writing the history of Hong Kong.” It places greater emphasis on Hong Kong’s unique culture, similar to the island historiography approach seen in Taiwan.

== History ==
Hong Kong-centered narratives of Hong Kong history had already appeared in the 1980s. Kwong Chi-man points out that at that time Steve Tsang, in A Modern History of Hong Kong, viewed Hong Kong history from the perspective of Hong Kong Chinese; Ko Tim-keung similarly described Hong Kong during the Japanese occupation from a Hong Kong-centered approach. By the late 1990s, due to the need of the People’s Republic of China to establish the legitimacy of the sovereignty handover, scholars in the region began to construct a narrative of Hong Kong history with this purpose in mind. Out of this effort emerged works such as The Vicissitudes of Hong Kong, broadcast on CCTV, and Hong Kong in the Nineteenth Century, edited by Liu Cunkuan They place particular emphasis on the oppression of Hong Kong people under British rule, the local resistance against British colonialism, and the relationship between Hong Kong and China In response, Wang Hongzhi and Cai Rongfang published The Burden of History: A View of Mainland China’s Hong Kong Historiography from Hong Kong (2000) and A Hong Kong People’s History of Hong Kong (2001), respectively. Both works place stronger emphasis on a Hong Kong-centered perspective, with the former further highlighting the problems present in the official narratives put forward by the People’s Republic of China

Later, in 2007, Marco Cabada released A Short History of Hong Kong, which examines Hong Kong’s history from a localist perspective. Its Chinese translation, titled 香港简史─从殖民地至特别行政区 (A Short History of Hong Kong: From Colony to Special Administrative Region), was published by Zhonghua Book Company in 2013.n 2013 and 2014, Kwong Chi-man published Lonely Outpost and Old Soldiers Never Die, respectively, applying the Hong Kong historical perspective to write about Chinese soldiers serving in the British Army and the Battle of Hong Kong during the Pacific War In 2014, Tsui Sing-on released City-State Chronicles: Twelve Books on Hong Kong’s Local History, where he employed the Hong Kong historical perspective to present twelve important works on the history of Hong Kong. In 2015, Kwong Kin-ming released The Hong Kong-British Era: British Colonial Governance Techniques, offering a Hong Kong-centered analysis of why the ‘hearts and minds’ failed to return after the handover and highlighting the advantages of the British colonial administration over the Hong Kong SAR government. In 2017, Tsui Sing-on extended the ideas from City-State Chronicles and released Hong Kong, a Restless Homeland: A Localist Perspective on Hong Kong’s Origins. A revised edition of this book was published in 2019 In this work, Hongkongers are depicted as a distinct national group. The author made it clear during the writing process that the aim was to challenge Chinese imperialism and Orientalism, and therefore there was no intention to maintain ‘neutrality or impartiality.

== Features ==
The Hong Kong historiographical approach emphasizes analyzing Hong Kong’s history with Hong Kong itself as the primary focus It advocates interpreting Hong Kong’s history from the viewpoint of Hong Kong residents It does not avoid engaging with historical events deemed sensitive by the People’s Republic of China, including the refugee wave from the People’s Republic of China to British Hong Kong, the territory’s economic development after World War II, the 1967 Hong Kong riots, and opinion polling on Hong Kong identity In contrast to the colonial and nationalist historiographies, it gives more weight to the voices and experiences of Hong Kong’s Chinese population and ethnic minorities, placing their rights and concerns at the forefront.

== Evaluation ==
Lau Chi-pang, director of the Hong Kong Institute for the Humanities and Social Sciences, is cautious about the localist historiographical approach, believing that it neglects the China–Hong Kong relationship embodied in historical artifacts and the clan traditions of the New Territories.However, Tsui Sing-on counters by arguing that the New Territories clan genealogies mentioned by Lau are fabricated constructs devised by indigenous residents to exploit the household registration system.

In A Hong Kong People’s History of Hong Kong, Choi Wing-hong proposes that the history from the Opium War to the Second World War should be rewritten from a Hong Kong-centered perspective

== See also ==
- De-Sinicization
- Sinocentrism
