= Bates CHI & Partners =

- Company type: A WPP Group company
- Industry: Marketing communications
- Founded: Hong Kong (2003)
- Headquarters: Hong Kong
- Owner: WPP
- Website: BatesCHI.com/

Bates CHI & Partners (formerly Bates 141 and Bates) is an advertising and marketing agency and a member of the WPP Group.

== History ==
The Bates brand was born in 1940, when Ted Bates opened his first office, Ted Bates Inc. In New York Ted eventually built his company into the world's fourth largest agency group and expanded his business for 26 years without losing a single client.

Ted Bates’ empire launched in Asia in the early 1960s after acquiring a stake in Cathay Advertising from George Patterson, an Australian advertising executive. Cathay Advertising was an agency founded in 1946 to service the advertising needs of the Cathay Group in Hong Kong and Singapore. It was used by Bates as a vehicle to drive expansion in the region so that by the late 1960s Ted Bates Inc. was already operating in Manila, Bangkok, Kuala Lumpur, Singapore and Hong Kong.

In February 2013, Bates partnered with CHI & Partners (Simon Clemmow, Johnny Hornby & Charles Inge), the UK's most awarded independent agency at Cannes (and another WPP affiliate), and was renamed as "Bates CHI & Partners".

== Notable events ==
2000:

- Bates launched Buick in China and Shanghai General Motors sold more automobiles than any other brand nationwide. At the same time, Bates 141 is recognized as the Best Automobile Creative Agency Award in China.

2003: BatesAsia 141 is born

- WPP buys Bates Worldwide and merges Bates Worldwide offices into its other advertising groups.
- However, the management team of Bates and 141 in Asia keep the company alive as BatesAsia 141.

2006:

- For three consecutive years, 141 helmed by managing director, Anthony Pounds and Creative Director, Mark Chung becomes the most awarded activation unit at the PMAAs. In 2006, 141 wins a total of 11 Golds.
- BatesAsia acquires West China's largest agency in Chengdu. Bates Apex is the only agency in China to win an EFFIE Gold twice, and Silver and Bronze several times.
- BatesAsia acquires the second biggest activation unit in India – 141 Sercon.
- Digby Richards joins BatesAsia as Chief Operating Officer, partnering then-President Jeffrey Yu.

2007:

- BatesAsia wins AIG, Virgin Mobile and Fiat.
- BatesAsia acquires Bates MeThinks – China's top integrated activation agencies.
- From 2002 to 2007, BatesAsia worked with Nokia as they became the number one phone brand in China.
- BatesAsia launches the Young Change Agents program, a career development and progression program to recognize its young rising stars and to develop them into future leaders.

2008:

- BatesAsia 141 re-brands as Bates 141 with a new logo and “eyes” as its visual ID.
- Bates 141 announces the acquisition of Bates EVision, a digital agency in China.

- Bates 141 announces the acquisition of Singapore-based 10AM .
- Bates 141 collaborates with New York-based PSFK to host its conference series in Singapore.
- Bates 141 Taiwan is the most awarded agency at the China Times Chinese Advertising Awards and the second most awarded at the China Times Awards.
- Bates 141 wins one Gold and one Silver at the Asia Digital Media awards for Sun Microsystems Netbeans Quiz and Anti-drugs campaigns.
- Bates 141 Indonesia wins a Gold at Indonesia's award show Citra for its Ramadan campaign for Sampoerna.

- Bates 141 wins Arla, Diana Food Group, Google and Jollibee in Vietnam.
- Bates 141 India becomes a Finalist at the World Effie Festival for its Uncommon Sense Marico campaign.
- Bates 141 India wins silver Effie for Virgin Mobile Think Hatke
- Bates 141 Singapore wins three Effies - two silver awards for National Council Against Drugs and Nokia N95 and one bronze for Nokia You Make it Reel.
- Bates 141 wins a Gold at the 23rd Marketing Agencies Association international Globe awards for Heineken Rugby World Cup.
- Bates 141 wins Merck (Neurobion and Sangobion) in Indonesia.
- Bates 141 wins Johnson & Johnson Xian Jannsen in China.

2013:

- Partnership with CHI & Partners completed, renamed as Bates CHI & Partners
