= Present Shock: When Everything Happens Now =

2013 book by Douglas Rushkoff

- First edition
- Author: Douglas Rushkoff
- Language: English
- Published: 2013
- Publisher: Current
- Publication place: United States

Present Shock: When Everything Happens Now is a non-fiction work written by Douglas Rushkoff and published in 2013. The book introduces the concept of present shock, a state of anxiety which people all live with as they try to keep up with the ever-increasing speed and immediacy of time. The instantaneous nature of digital technology has shaped the way humanity perceives and deals with time. According to Rushkoff, rather than focusing on building a better future, society is primarily concerned with building a worthwhile present. Rushkoff addresses brands, pop culture, news outlets and political movements, with particular attention to the post-Y2K era, in an attempt to explain the effects of presentism on modern humanity.

Present Shock is considered by some critics to be a contemporary variant of Alvin Toffler’s 1970s work, Future Shock, which suggested consequences of “too much change in too short a period of time.” According to Janet Maslin, whereas Toffler's take on the subject is more alarmist, Rushkoff takes an analytical approach to the perception of time.

== Content ==
=== Narrative Collapse ===
Rushkoff references the effect of live news reporting and the emergence of pop culture to make sense of diminishing attention spans and the need for instantaneous gratification from TV programs. He suggests we no longer have the patience to endure linear storylines. The solution he provides is to allow viewers to insert themselves directly into the narrative, becoming a participant rather than a spectator.

=== Digiphrenia ===
Digiphrenia is described as what happens when one does insert themselves into a narrative. This insertion happens repeatedly until they are trying to manage multiple versions of themselves simultaneously, making it more difficult for their mind to process the digital multi-tasking. Rushkoff suggests self-awareness can assist in this process. Being able to identify when the right time is to insert oneself into a narrative and when to seclude oneself can be helpful in dealing with multi-tasking.

=== Overwinding ===
Overwinding refers to the tendency to think of immense time periods squished into smaller or even nonexistent periods. Rushkoff believes this springloading of time from future into present is the cause of Black Friday beginning earlier each year or the need for traders to eliminate milliseconds off their deals to gain an advantage.

=== Fractalnoia ===
According to Rushkoff, the absence of a linear narrative makes the intricacies of cause and effect more difficult. The time between something and its result is diminished to nothing, and when the happens, following the story beginning to end becomes impossible. Fractalnoia addresses the emergence of big data and how it has begun to affect the abilities of pattern recognition. Too much data creates chaos for one to make sense of the multitude of connections between the data. Despite the emergence of social media and ease of making connections, we can no longer keep up with them.

=== Apocalypto ===
Society has become infatuated with apocalyptic themes because of an underlying desire to break out of the current situation we're in. Rushkoff suggests the pressure of time is a burden and we have lost faith in our ability to solve global crises, which has led to the existence of doomsday preppers and obsessions with the Mayan Calendar. As a solution, he urges us to relax and adopt a more practical outlook to the future.

== Reception ==
After publishing in 2013, Present Shock was reviewed by numerous outlets including Forbes, The New York Times, and Wired.com. Rushkoff gave talks at Harvard University's Berkman Klein Center for Internet & Society, PSFK and Ted about Present Shock and the new digital age.
