= Tognetti =

Tognetti is an Italian surname. Notable people with this surname include:

- Ernst Tognetti, Swiss wrestler
- Marina Tognetti, founder and CEO of Myngle, a pioneer in the live online language education
- Richard Tognetti (born 1965), Australian violinist, composer and conductor

== See also ==
- Palazzo Tognetti, Art Nouveau building in Grossetto, Italy
- Togni, surname
