= Rosser Reeves =

American advertising executive and pioneer of television advertising

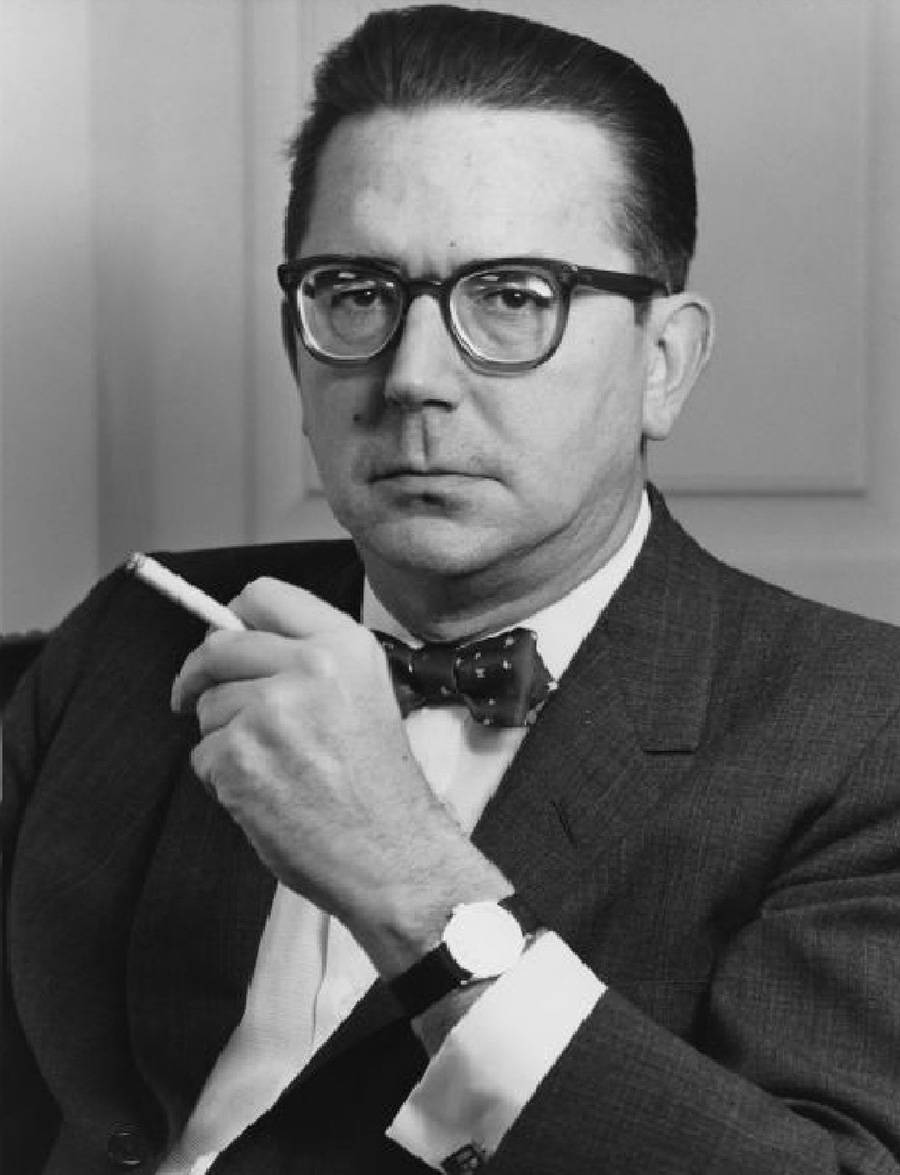
Rosser Reeves

Rosser Reeves (10 September 1910 – 24 January 1984) was an American advertising executive and pioneer of television advertising; Reeves generated millions for his clients. The Ted Bates agency, where he rose to chairman, exists today as Bates CHI & Partners.

== Early life and start in advertising ==
Reeves was born in Virginia to a Methodist preacher, and briefly attended the University of Virginia until he was expelled for drunkenly crashing a friend's car during the Prohibition era. Luckily, he had just won one hundred dollars as a prize for a state-wide chemistry contest that served as his final exam for first year Chem 101. While other students wrote novel chemical formulae as their submission, Reeves, by virtue of not knowing anything about chemistry having spent the semester drinking, dancing and gambling, blithely submitted an essay titled "Better Living Through Chemistry". He would later use this title for DuPont Corporation campaign. The one hundred dollars was enough money to move to Richmond where he was hired at a new bank that was hiring young contest winners. Finding that he was a poor accountant but verbally gifted, he began writing advertisements. He soon moved to New York City to found Ted Bates & Co with Ted Bates.

== Advertising style ==
Reeves believed the purpose of advertising is to sell. He insisted that an advertisement or commercial should show off the value or unique selling proposition, (or USP) of a product, not the cleverness or humor of a copywriter. His most typical ad is probably that for Anacin, a headache medicine. The ad was considered grating and annoying by almost all viewers but it was remarkably successful, tripling the product's sales. In 7 years the 59-second commercial made more money than the movie Gone With The Wind had in a quarter-century.

His ads were focused around what he coined the unique selling proposition, the one reason the product needed to be bought or was better than its competitors. These often took the form of slogans — Reeves oversaw the introduction of dozens, some that still exist to this day, such as M&M's "melts in your mouth, not in your hand." He argued that advertising campaigns should be unchanging with a single slogan for each product. His commercials for Bic pens, Minute Maid orange juice, M&M's candies, Colgate toothpaste and other products used similar methods, often making dramatic demonstrations.

Reeves pointed out that to work, advertising had to be honest. He insisted the product being sold actually be superior, and argued that no amount of advertising could move inferior goods. He also disagreed that advertising was able to create demand where it did not exist. Successful advertising for a flawed product would only increase the number of people who tried the product and became dissatisfied with it. If advertising is effective enough and a product flawed enough, the advertising will accelerate the destruction of the brand. Similarly, Reeves believed it was a waste of money to claim uniqueness that doesn't exist, because consumers will soon find out, and they won't come back to the brand. This is important because historically fortunes are made from repeat business. Money would be better spent building some kind of meaningful advantage into a product before launching a costly advertising campaign to promote it.

Reeves advised clients to be wary of brand image advertising which is less likely to be successful than his claim-based strategy. This is because when communication relies on an image, the claim is not articulated. An image can almost always be interpreted different ways, many if not most of which won't do a product any good. The message that a viewer takes away from an image is often very different from what the advertiser had intended.

Or to put it another way: practically every product has a number of benefits that might be claimed. Commonly one of the benefits is more popular than the others, even more popular than the others combined. Therefore, it's imperative to do everything to make people understand the most important benefit, to achieve credibility and to avoid distractions. The aim is to have as high a percentage of people as possible take out of an advertisement what the advertiser intends to put into it. This is most likely to be achieved if a claim is articulated and proven with credible evidence—in a brief commercial, some kind of dramatic demonstration.

Reeves is also notable for creating Dwight Eisenhower's presidential ads for the 1952 election. He packaged Eisenhower as a forthright, strong, yet friendly leader. The commercials all included a regular person asking a question to the upper right of the screen. They would cut to Eisenhower, not wearing glasses to look stronger, looking to the lower left and then turning to the camera and responding. They were created by letting Eisenhower speak for a number of hours. Then questions were crafted later that best fit his answers.

== Later years ==
In the 1960s Reeves' techniques began to fail. Consumers became more savvy and learned to tune out uninteresting commercials, and within the advertising industry itself the Creative Revolution, exemplified by Doyle Dane Bernbach's "Think Small" campaign for the Volkswagen Beetle. The Creative Revolution rejected many of his precepts though some might argue that the "Think Small" does conform to the rules set out in Reeves' book Reality in Advertising because it highlights what is most unusual about the Beetle, namely its small size and distinct shape. Reeves retired at age 55. He declared that he had always planned to retire at that age, but many of his competitors felt it was because of the decline in his influence.

He came out of retirement in 1967 to form the Tiderock Corporation, which he described as a "think tank" for corporate business. One of its projects was a promotion in 1968 of a pro-smoking article by Stanley Frank published in True magazine. The promotion was paid for by the Tobacco Institute, who also paid Frank to write the article. This was common practice among advertising men of the time and wholly unremarkable from the perspective of 1960s-era business ethics. Reeves died of a heart attack on January 24, 1984, at his home in Chapel Hill, North Carolina. He was 73 years old.

In the late 1950s, Rosser Reeves bought the 138.72-carat star ruby, the largest star ruby ever. It is said that he carried the ruby around with him and that he considered it as his good luck charm. Mined in Sri Lanka, the original 140 carat ruby was cut down slightly to improve the star pattern in it. In 1965 Reeves donated the star ruby to the Smithsonian where it is currently on display in the Museum of Natural History in Washington, DC.

== Published works ==
Reeves expressed his views in his 1961 book, Reality in Advertising (Knopf) which is still taught at Harvard Business School. An interview with Reeves was included in The Art of Writing Advertising (1965). His greatest contributions were to express more clearly than anyone else the philosophy of a claim and to show how the philosophy could be applied to commercials that involve severe time constraints.

Reeves wrote a well received novel, Popo (Knopf) about a poet who leaves a life of material wealth to move to Greenwich Village in New York City, to pursue his poetry.

Reeves co-authored The 99 Critical Shots in Pool with Ray Martin to explain both Euclid and Sir Isaac Newtons' geometric proofs.

Rosser Reeves' poem E=MC2 appeared in "The Best From Fantasy and Science Fiction, Tenth Series" in 1961. The editors commented:

"The author is chairman of the board of a large corporation, and we confess we find it intriguing and comforting to know that a man whose workday is devoted to the harsh realities of multi-million-dollar profit and loss has in him that good old-fashioned sense of wonder."
