= List of Latin phrases (Q) =

This page is one of a series listing English translations of notable Latin phrases, such as veni, vidi, vici and et cetera. Some of the phrases are themselves translations of Greek phrases, as ancient Greek rhetoric and literature started centuries before the beginning of Latin literature in ancient Rome.

Latin	Translation	Notes
qua definitione	by virtue of definition	Thus: "by definition"; variant of per definitionem; sometimes used in German-speaking countries. Occasionally misrendered as "qua definitionem".
qua patet orbis	as far as the world extends	Motto of the Royal Netherlands Marine Corps
quae cum ita sint	these things being the case	Or, "since these things are the case" or "Since things are this way". Cicero.
quae non posuisti, ne tollas	do not take away what you did not put in place	Plato, Laws
quae non prosunt singula multa iuvant	what alone is not useful helps when accumulated	Ovid, Remedia amoris
quaecumque sunt vera	whatsoever is true	frequently used as motto; taken from Philippians 4:8 of the Bible
quaecumque vera doce me	teach me whatsoever is true	motto of St. Joseph's College, Edmonton at the University of Alberta
quaere	to seek	Or "you might ask..." Used to suggest doubt or to ask one to consider whether something is correct. Often introduces rhetorical or tangential questions.
quaerite primum regnum Dei	seek ye first the kingdom of God	Also quaerite primo regnum dei; frequently used as motto (e.g. Newfoundland and Labrador)
qualis artifex pereo	As what kind of artist do I perish?	Or "What a craftsman dies in me!" Attributed to Nero in Suetonius' De vita Caesarum
Qualitas potentia nostra	Quality is our might	motto of Finnish Air Force
quam bene non quantum	how well, not how much	motto of Mount Royal University, Calgary, Canada
quam bene vivas referre (or refert), non quam diu	it is how well you live that matters, not how long	Seneca, Epistulae morales ad Lucilium CI (101)
quamdiu (se) bene gesserit	as long as he shall have behaved well (legal Latin)	I.e., "[while on] good behavior." So for example the Act of Settlement 1701 stipulated that judges' commissions are valid quamdiu se bene gesserint (during good behaviour). (Notice the different singular, "gesserit", and plural, "gesserint", forms.) It was from this phrase that Frank Herbert extracted the name for the Bene Gesserit sisterhood in the Dune novels.
quantocius quantotius	the sooner, the better	or, as quickly as possible
quantum libet (q.l.)	as much as pleases	medical shorthand for "as much as you wish"
quantum sufficit (qs)	as much as is enough	medical shorthand for "as much as needed" or "as much as will suffice"
quaque hora (qh)	every hour	medical shorthand; also quaque die (qd), "every day", quaque mane (qm), "every morning", and quaque nocte (qn), "every night"
quare clausum fregit	wherefore he broke the close	An action of trespass; thus called, by reason the writ demands the person summoned to answer to wherefore he broke the close (quare clausum fregit), i.e. why he committed such a trespass.
quater in die (qid)	four times a day	medical shorthand
quem deus vult perdere, dementat prius	Whom the gods would destroy, they first make mad	
quem di diligunt adulescens moritur	he whom the gods love dies young	Other translations of diligunt include "prize especially" or "esteem". From Plautus, Bacchides, IV, 7, 18. In this comic play, a sarcastic servant says this to his aging master. The rest of the sentence reads: dum valet sentit sapit ("while he is healthy, perceptive and wise").
questio quid iuris	I ask what law?	from the Summoner's section of Chaucer's General Prologue to The Canterbury Tales, line 648
qui audet adipiscitur	Who Dares Wins	The motto of the SAS, of the British Army
qui bene cantat bis orat	He who sings well praises twice	from St. Augustine of Hippo's commentary on Psalm 73, verse 1: Qui enim cantat laudem, non solum laudat, sed etiam hilariter laudat ("He who sings praises, not only praises, but praises joyfully")
qui bono	who with good	common misspelling of the Latin phrase cui bono ("who benefits?")
qui docet in doctrina	he that teacheth, on teaching	Motto of the University of Chester. A less literal translation is "Let those who teach, teach" or "Let the teacher teach".
qui gladio ferit gladio perit	He who strikes a sword dies by the sword	Or "live by the sword, die by the sword"; derived from Jesus's words in the garden of Gethsemane in the Gospel of Matthew 26:52, Omnes enim, qui acceperint gladium, gladio peribunt (for all who take up the sword shall perish by the sword).
qui habet aures audiendi audiat	he who has ears to hear, let him hear	"He that hath ears to hear, let him hear"; Mark Mark 4:9
qui me tangit, vocem meam audit	who touches me, hears my voice	common inscription on bells
qui tacet consentire videtur	he who is silent is taken to agree	Thus, silence gives consent. Sometimes accompanied by the proviso "ubi loqui debuit ac potuit", that is, "when he ought to have spoken and was able to". Pope Boniface VII in Decretale di Bonifacio VIII, Libro V, Tit. 12, reg. 43 AD 1294
qui prior est tempore potior est jure	Who is first in point of time is stronger in right	As set forth in the "Property Law" casebook written by Jesse Dukeminier, which is generally used to teach first year law students.
qui tam pro domino rege quam pro se ipso in hac parte sequitur	he who brings an action for the king as well as for himself	Generally known as 'qui tam,' it is the technical legal term for the unique mechanism in the federal False Claims Act that allows persons and entities with evidence of fraud against federal programs or contracts to sue the wrongdoer on behalf of the Government.
qui totum vult totum perdit	he who wants everything loses everything	Attributed to Publilius Syrus
qui transtulit sustinet	he who transplanted still sustains	Or "he who brought us across still supports us", meaning God. State motto of Connecticut. Originally written as sustinet qui transtulit in 1639.
quia suam uxorem etiam suspicione vacare vellet	because he should wish his wife to be free even from any suspicion	Attributed to Julius Caesar by Plutarch, Caesar 10. Translated loosely as "because even the wife of Caesar may not be suspected". At the feast of Bona Dea, a sacred festival for females only, which was being held at the Domus Publica, the home of the Pontifex Maximus, Caesar, and hosted by his second wife, Pompeia, the notorious politician Clodius arrived in disguise. Caught by the outraged noblewomen, Clodius fled before they could kill him on the spot for sacrilege. In the ensuing trial, allegations arose that Pompeia and Clodius were having an affair, and while Caesar asserted that this was not the case and no substantial evidence arose suggesting otherwise, he nevertheless divorced, with this quotation as explanation.
quibuscum(que) viis	(and) by whatever ways possible	Used by Honoré de Balzac in several works, including Illusions perdues and Splendeurs et misères des courtisanes.
quid agis	What are you doing?	What's happening? What's going on? What's the news? What's up?
quid est veritas	What is truth?	In the Vulgate translation of John 18:38, Pilate's question to Jesus (Greek: Τί ἐστιν ἀλήθεια;). A possible answer is an anagram of the phrase: est vir qui adest, "it is the man who is here."
quid novi ex Africa	What of the new out of Africa?	less literally, "What's new from Africa?"; derived from an Aristotle quotation
quid nunc	What now?	Commonly shortened to quidnunc. As a noun, a quidnunc is a busybody or a gossip. Patrick Campbell worked for The Irish Times under the pseudonym "Quidnunc".
quid sit quidditas quidditatis	What is the quiddity of quiddity?	A philosophical question also raised, in the context of German legal theory, by Wilhelm Scheuerle in his classic 1963 essay Vom Wesen des Wesens: Studien über das sogenannte Wesensargument im juristischen Begründen.
quid pro quo	what for what	Commonly used in English, it is also translated as "this for that" or "a thing for a thing". Signifies a favor exchanged for a favor. The traditional Latin expression for this meaning was do ut des ("I give, so that you may give").
quid pro tanto retribuamus	What shall we give back in return for so much?	Exhortation regarding civic duty, cultural inheritance, and the responsibility of the living to honor the sacrifices of the past. Generalised from Quid retribuam Domino pro omnibus quae retribuit mihi? ("What shall I render to the Lord for all His benefits toward me?") from Psalm 116:12.
Quid rides? Mutato nomine de te fabula narratur.	Why do you laugh? Change but the name, and the story is told of yourself.	Horace, Satires, I. 1. 69.
quidquid Latine dictum sit altum videtur	whatever has been said in Latin seems deep	Or "anything said in Latin sounds profound". A recent ironic Latin phrase to poke fun at people who seem to use Latin phrases and quotations only to make themselves sound more important or "educated". Similar to the less common omnia dicta fortiora si dicta Latina.
Quidquid non agnoscit glossa, non agnoscit curia	Whatever the Glossa does not recognize, the court does not recognize.	
quieta non movere	don't move settled things	
quilibet potest renunciare juri pro se inducto	anyone may renounce a law introduced for their own benefit	Used in classical law to differentiate law imposed by the state for the benefit of a person in general, but by the state on behalf of them, and one imposed specifically that that person ought to have a say in whether the law is implemented.
Quis custodiet ipsos custodes?	Who will guard the guards themselves?	Commonly associated with Plato who in the Republic poses this question; and from Juvenal's On Women, referring to the practice of having eunuchs guard women and beginning with the word sed ("but"). Usually translated less literally, as "Who watches the watchmen (or modern, 'watchers')?" This translation is a common epigraph, such as of the Tower Commission and Alan Moore's Watchmen comic book series.
quis leget haec?	Who will read this?	
quis, quid, ubi, quibus auxiliis, cur, quomodo, quando?	Who, what, where, by what means, why, how, when?	Compare the Five Ws. From Thomas Aquinas's Summa Theologica, but ancient authors provide other similar lists.
quis separabit?	Who will separate us?	motto of Northern Ireland and of the Order of St Patrick
quis ut Deus	Who [is] as God?	Usually translated "Who is like unto God?" Questions who would have the audacity to compare himself to a Supreme Being. It is a translation of the Hebrew name 'Michael' = Mi cha El Who like God מי/כ/ אל Hebrew: מִיכָאֵל (right to left).
quo errat demonstrator	where the prover errs	A pun on "quod erat demonstrandum"
quo fata ferunt	where the fates bear us to	motto of Bermuda
quo non ascendam	to what heights can I not rise?	motto of Army Burn Hall College
quod verum tutum	what is true is right	motto of Spier's School
Quo Vadimus?	Where are we going?	Title of the series finale of Aaron Sorkin's TV dramedy Sports Night
quo vadis?	Where are you going?	According to Vulgate translation of John 13:36, Saint Peter asked Jesus Domine, quo vadis? ("Lord, where are you going?"). The King James Version has the translation "Lord, whither goest thou?"
Quo warranto	by what warrant?	Medieval Latin title for a prerogative writ by which a court requires some person or entity to prove the source of some authority it is exercising. Used for various purposes in different jurisdictions.
quocunque jeceris stabit	whithersoever you throw it, it will stand	motto of the Isle of Man
quod abundat non obstat	what is abundant doesn't hinder	It is no problem to have too much of something.
quod cito fit, cito perit	what is done quickly, perishes quickly	Things done in a hurry are more likely to fail and fail quicker than those done with care.
quod erat demonstrandum (Q.E.D.)	what was to be demonstrated	The abbreviation is often written at the bottom of a mathematical proof. Sometimes translated loosely into English as "The Five Ws", W.W.W.W.W., which stands for "Which Was What We Wanted".
quod erat faciendum (Q.E.F.)	which was to be done	Or "which was to be constructed". Used in translations of Euclid's Elements when there was nothing to prove, but there was something being constructed, for example a triangle with the same size as a given line.
quod est (q.e.)	which is	
quod est necessarium est licitum	what is necessary is lawful	
quod gratis asseritur, gratis negatur	what is asserted without reason may be denied without reason	If no grounds have been given for an assertion, then there are no grounds needed to reject it.
quod licet Iovi, non licet bovi	what is permitted to Jupiter is not permitted to an ox	If an important person does something, it does not necessarily mean that everyone can do it (cf. double standard). Iovi (also commonly rendered Jovi) is the dative form of Iuppiter ("Jupiter" or "Jove"), the chief god of the Romans.
quod me nutrit me destruit	what nourishes me destroys me	Cf. § quod sapit nutrit. Thought to have originated with Elizabethan playwright Christopher Marlowe. Generally interpreted to mean that that which motivates or drives a person can consume him or her from within. This phrase has become a popular slogan or motto for pro-ana websites, anorexics and bulimics.
quod natura non dat Salmantica non praestat	what nature does not give, Salamanca does not provide	Refers to the Spanish University of Salamanca, meaning that education cannot substitute the lack of brains.
quod non fecerunt barbari, fecerunt Barberini	What the barbarians did not do, the Barberinis did	A well-known satirical lampoon left attached to the ancient "speaking" statue of Pasquino on a corner of the Piazza Navona in Rome, Italy. Through a sharp pun the writer criticizes Pope Urban VIII, of the Barberini family, who reused stones and decorations from ancient buildings to build new ones, thus wrecking classical constructions that even the barbarians had not touched.
quod periit, periit	What is gone is gone	What has happened has happened and it cannot be changed, thus we should look forward into the future instead of being pulled by the past.
quod sapit nutrit	what tastes good nourishes	Ancient saying, promoted by Galen; cf. § quod me nutrit me destruit
quod scripsi, scripsi	What I have written I have written.	Pilate to the chief priests (John 19:22)
quod supplantandum, prius bene sciendum	Whatever is to be supplanted, [must] first be understood	A caution against following a doctrine of Naive Analogy when attempting to formulate a scientific hypothesis.
quod vide (q.v.)	which see	Used after a term, phrase, or topic that should be looked up elsewhere in the current document, book, etc. For more than one term or phrase, the plural is quae vide (qq.v.).
quodcumque dixerit vobis, facite	Whatever He tells you, that you shall do.	More colloquially: "Do whatever He [Jesus] tells you to do." Instructions of Mary to the servants at the Wedding at Cana. (John 2:5). Also the motto of East Catholic High School.
quomodo vales	How are you?	Mainly in Neo-Latin, but also in John Jortin (1758), The Life of Erasmus, vol. 1, p. 196
quorum	of whom	the number of members whose presence is required under the rules to make any given meeting constitutional
quorum pars minima fui	of whom I was a small part	Attributed to notorious spy Kim Philby discussing his contribution to the status of Allen Dulles as a legendary clandestine officer
quos amor verus tenuit tenebit	Those whom true love has held, it will go on holding	from Thyestes, Seneca the Younger
quot capita, tot sensus	as many heads, so many perceptions	"There are as many opinions as there are heads" – Terence
quot homines tot sententiae	as many men, so many opinions	Or "there are as many opinions as there are people", "how many people, so many opinions"
quousque tandem?	For how much longer?	From Cicero's first speech In Catilinam to the Roman Senate regarding the conspiracy of Catiline: Quo usque tandem abutere, Catilina, patientia nostra? ("For how much longer, Catiline, will you abuse our patience?"). Besides being a well-known line in itself, it was often used as a text sample in printing (cf. lorem ipsum). See also O tempora, o mores! (from the same speech).
