= HSBC Fisherman advertisement =

1995 advertisement by HSBC

Fisherman (漁民)
- Agency: Ted Bates (Hong Kong) (Bates Hong Kong Limited)
- Client: HSBC
- Language: Cantonese, Hokkien (English subtitle version)
- Media: Television, cinema
- Running time: 1 minute 32 seconds
- Release date: 1995
- Slogan: 與你並肩，邁向明天 (Your Future Is Our Future)
- Written by: Angela Pong (龐婉貴) (Chinese copy); David Alberts (English copy)
- Directed by: Louis Ng (吳鋒濠)
- Music by: Chan Ming-Cheung
- Produced by: Rowena Chu (朱小亞)
- Country: British Hong Kong

The 1995 HSBC "Fisherman" advertisement is a television advertisement launched by HSBC in British Hong Kong in 1995. It is commonly referred to as "Fisherman" (漁民). (Note: The advertisement does not have a standardized name or an official name that has been passed down through the ages; this entry uses the term "fishermen" (漁民), though other sources refer to them as 渔夫.) It was planned by the Hong Kong branch of the advertising agency Ted Bates. Through the monologue of a fisherman, it depicts the Hong Kong spirit and links this spirit with the corporate image of HSBC, which has a history of more than a century.

The advertisement won several awards and has been the subject of analysis by advertising and cultural scholars. In addition to advertising techniques, the analysis also involves capitalism consciousness, Hong Kong identity, and the mentality in the face of the approaching 1997 handover.

== Advertisement content ==
In black-and-white footage, a hereditary fisherman narrates his life experiences in monologue, mentioning three major natural disasters in History of Hong Kong, including the loss of his fishing boat during Typhoon Wanda, earning money to buy a new boat by transporting water for fishing vessels during the 1960s water rationing, and the tragic situation in Hong Kong during the June 18 rainstorm. In his old age, his son has started a family, and they move into a public housing estate and operate a noodle stall on land, no longer fishing. The footage intersperses relevant news clips. The monologue emphasizes the need for self-reliance and adaptability in the face of adversity, for example:

- "My grandfather said that those who make a living by fishing must observe the weather. I say that people must also observe themselves." (Note: Original: “我阿爺話，捉魚搵食嘅，要睇天做人。我話呢，做人都要睇自己嘅。”)
- "I told myself, as long as people are fine, what can't be started over from the beginning?" (Note: Original: “我同自己講，人無事，有乜唔可以從頭嚟過？”)
- "Then? The June 18 rainstorm. Alas! The sky really... but it's fine, having lived for decades, what storms haven't we seen?" (Note: Original: “跟住？六一八水災。唉！個天真係......不過無事嘅，做咗幾廿年人，有咩風雨未見過呀？”)
- "It doesn't matter what you do! In Hong Kong, whether you can make a living or not depends on yourself." (Note: Original: “做咩都無所謂啦！香港地，搵唔搵到食，都係睇自己嘅啫。”)

== Concept and production ==
=== Background ===
"Fisherman" is an image advertisement by HSBC, first aired in 1995. During this period, HSBC's corporate slogan in Hong Kong was "與你並肩，邁向明天" (English version: "Your Future Is Our Future"). HSBC had already used this slogan when it launched the "Old Couple" advertisement in 1994. (Note: It tells the story of how an elderly couple met. The line, “I don’t like the noodles you cook; I just want to see you more often,” (“我唔係鍾意食你煮嘅麵呀，我係想見多你幾面㗎咋”) has become a classic line. It was performed by the married couple Xu Fen and Jian Ruichao, though it is not based on their real-life experiences.) The "Old Couple" and "Fisherman", as well as the subsequent series of image advertisements, all followed a humanistic route. Prior to this, HSBC's advertisements tended to project a middle-class professional image. The shift in advertising style began because HSBC regularly conducted market research and noticed that humanistic advertisements received better responses. At that time, there were many advertisements selling nostalgia, love, or family affection. On the other hand, due to the approaching "1997 deadline", starting around 1993, some advertisements exploring Hong Kong identity began to emerge. "Fisherman" and its series were conceived against this background.

It has also been suggested that HSBC, which was mainly British capital, planned to relocate its headquarters back to the United Kingdom in response to the 1997 handover of Hong Kong's sovereignty. This move drew strong criticism from Hong Kong society, so there was an urgent need to reshape a localized image.

=== Creation ===
The advertising agency responsible for this advertisement was Ted Bates (Hong Kong) (Bates Hong Kong Limited). The main members of the creative and production team included creative director David Alberts, art director Rachel Chau (周珮如), producer Rowena Chu (朱小亞), director Louis Ng (吳鋒濠), cinematographer Lester Wong, editor Nelson Ng (吳鋒霖). The copy was written by Angela Pong (龐婉貴) and David Alberts, and the music was credited to Chan Ming-Cheung. (Note: Chan Ming-Cheung, also known as Taiwanese musician Chen Ming-chang, composed the background music for this advertisement. It is actually the track "Rain" from the soundtrack he created in 1986 for the film Dust in the Wind.)

According to recollections from Rachel Chau and Angela Pong, the central idea set before conceptualization was "nothing will get into the way of Hong Kong people's success" (沒有東西能阻止香港人走上成功之路). Combined with HSBC's slogan "Your Future Is Our Future", the team came up with the concept of using ordinary people's experiences to witness Hong Kong's success, leading to the idea that "persisting in the Hong Kong spirit, tomorrow will definitely be fine". In the end, three different stories were created to represent Hong Kong people of different eras and social classes, including this "Fisherman" which symbolizes Hong Kong's development from a fishing village, the "Three Generations" (also known as "Grandfather and Grandson") about a grandfather who returned from San Francisco to develop in Hong Kong, a taxi driver father who witnessed Hong Kong's economic ups and downs, and a son who chose not to emigrate, and "Factory Owner" (also known as "Daughter") about a daughter recalling her factory owner father's transformation history. Among them, "Fisherman" was the most popular and is regarded as a representative work of Hong Kong identity exploration at that time.

=== Style ===
This advertisement was shot in a style imitating a black-and-white documentary, with a strong sense of realism.

Advertising practitioner and university tutor KC Tsang and designer Liu Kunyou pointed out in their co-authored work that although HSBC is a well-known big brand, this advertisement still follows the "grand narrative" that rose in the 1980s (another advertising practitioner Elaine Chow described it as "epic"), but it is cut from the perspective of ordinary people, seeing the big from the small.

Hokkien people are one of the main ethnic groups of traditional fishermen in Hong Kong. The production team originally wanted the fisherman to monologue in Southern Min, but the client opposed it, believing that the audience should be able to understand it directly. In the end, in the version aired on Chinese television channels, the fisherman monologued in Cantonese with a slight accent. The English subtitle version of this advertisement uses Hokkien monologue.

== Reception ==
=== Advertising techniques ===
Marketing scholars Chen Yi and others from Southwestern University of Finance and Economics in the People's Republic of China rated this advertisement as a classic case of corporate identity advertising strategy in their co-authored work. It shapes the image of HSBC, with a history of more than a century, sharing joys and sorrows with Hong Kong people and progressing and growing together.

The book Foreign Contemporary Advertising Analysis 150 Cases published by China Radio and Television Publishing House believes that only HSBC, with such a long history in Hong Kong, matches the Hong Kong people's qualities and history in the advertisement, which is a successful application of the "Unique selling proposition". (Note: This book mentions another advertising slogan: “Grass that bends in the wind grows stronger when faced with adversity.” However, as this phrase could not be found in primary sources or film footage, its authenticity remains in doubt.)

=== Cultural and political relevance ===
Hong Kong cultural scholars Ma Kit Wai and Tsang provided a detailed analysis of this advertisement in their co-authored work. They summarized the content and style of the advertisement as: "The aesthetics of this advertisement simulate the style of a serious documentary, with thoughtful narration, carefully collaged historical images, and through the eyes of a fisherman, re-segment and reassemble the Hong Kong experience in just one minute. The advertisement uses black-and-white film form, through concise images, stories and characters, to reshape the history of Hong Kong over the past decades with feeling."

Other insights from Ma and Tsang include:

First, as the main bank in Hong Kong that developed under the shelter of the British Hong Kong government, HSBC launched this nostalgic advertisement before the 1997 handover of Hong Kong's sovereignty. Whether for the producers or the audience, it reflects a strong desire for a smooth transition.

Second, this advertisement's imitation of documentary techniques is similar to the documentaries produced by the Hong Kong government film unit established in the 1960s. Some of the footage used in the advertisement also comes from those documentaries. The Hong Kong government film unit was a propaganda agency that introduced the methods of documentary master John Grierson. On the surface, it is realistic and without political rendering, but secretly it cleverly guides ideology. Regarding the ideology symbolized by this advertisement, they pointed out that Hong Kong has always been described as a very pure capitalist society, and the Hong Kong spirit promoted in this advertisement has a strong capitalist consciousness, emphasizing individuals' unyielding efforts to overcome difficulties in adversity, while avoiding talking about the role of government, demands for social security, folk collective actions and other aspects. Another scholar Benson Wong also summarized and agreed with this view. Another scholar Lam Kam-yee has similar views. He cited examples avoided in discussion such as the British Hong Kong government's long-term use of large ships to transport drinking water from abroad to supply British people in Hong Kong during the 1960s water rationing period, and the Yau Ma Tei boat dwellers incident in the late 1970s where fishermen fought for rights.

Third, the production team's proposal for Hokkien was opposed, reflecting the "domestication" of minority ethnic accents.

Fourth, during the British colonial era, Hong Kong long lacked national consciousness and had no way to position its history, which instead gave media creators more impulse to fill this gap through nostalgic commercial advertisements and other works. They summarized the value of this advertisement as: "The advertisement appeared in a special social mutation, satisfying the social desire for shared nostalgia, and reconciling the contradictions between national concepts, local identity, and transnational capitalism. Due to various seemingly irreconcilable conflicts and the undercurrents of strong political and economic pressure, it intensified Hong Kong people's nostalgic desire, and also made this smooth and natural nostalgic advertisement more fascinating."

== Awards and nominations ==
Advertisement name	Award year	Award ceremony	Award	Result
Fisherman	1996	Association of Accredited Advertising Agents of Hong Kong Kam Fan Awards	Best TV/Cinema Commercial – Telecommunications/Media/Corporate Category	Gold
Fisherman	1996	Association of Accredited Advertising Agents of Hong Kong Kam Fan Awards	Best Director	Silver
Fisherman	1996	Association of Accredited Advertising Agents of Hong Kong Kam Fan Awards	Best Cinematography	Silver
Fisherman	1996	Association of Accredited Advertising Agents of Hong Kong Kam Fan Awards	Best Chinese Copywriter	Silver
Fisherman	1996	Association of Accredited Advertising Agents of Hong Kong Kam Fan Awards	Best Editing	Bronze
Fisherman, Grandson (i.e. "Three Generations"), Daughter (i.e. "Factory Owner")	1996	Association of Accredited Advertising Agents of Hong Kong Kam Fan Awards	Best TV/Cinema Advertising Series	Gold
漁民	1996	Asia Television 2nd Top Ten Television Advertisements Awards	Top Ten Most Popular Television Advertisements	Won

It is also recorded that this advertisement won the "1996 Asia's Most Creative Advertisement" and the "World Chinese Advertisement" Gold Award. (Note: Due to the passage of time, no official record of the award could be found.)
