= Togni =

Togni is an Italian surname, may refer to:

- Camillo Togni, Italian composer
- Darix Togni (1922–1976), Italian circus man
- Eugênio Rômulo Togni (born 1982), retired Brazilian footballer and current football coach
- Franco Togni (1960-2016), Italian male marathon runner and mountain runner
- Gastón Alberto Togni (born 1997), Argentine professional football forward
- Gianni Togni, Italian singer
- Marco Togni, Italian Mathematician
- Peter Togni, Canadian composer
- Raul Togni Neto (born 1992), Brazilian professional basketball player
- Rômulo Eugênio Togni, (born 1982) Brazilian footballer
- Victor Togni, Swiss Canadian organist

== See also ==
- Mamma Togni, an Italian dramatic monologue by Dario Fo and Franca Rame
