= Janko Kastelic =

Canadian–Slovene conductor (born 1969)

- Born: January 10, 1969 (age 57); Ljubljana, Slovenia
- Education: University of Toronto
- Occupations: Conductor, music educator
- Years active: 1990s–present
- Organizations: Vienna State Opera, Opéra National de Paris, Maribor Opera House
- Known for: Music Director of the Opera House of Maribor (2008–2011)
- Notable work: Die Fledermaus (Vienna), The Queen of Spades (Maribor)
- Awards: Gold Medal in Performance (Western Ontario Conservatory of Music)

Janko Kastelic (born 10 January 1969) is a Canadian–Slovenian conductor and music educator. From September 2008 to June 2011, he was music director of the Opera House of Maribor, Slovenia.

== Biography ==
Janko Kastelic was born in Ljubljana, Slovenia, and grew up in Toronto, Canada. He began his musical career as a boy soprano and accompanist at St. Michael's Choir School. He won the gold medal in performance from the Western Ontario Conservatory of Music in piano and organ and performed internationally. From 1987 to 1991, Kastelic attended the Faculty of Music at the University of Toronto, where he studied conducting, theory, composition, and piano.

Following a completion of his studies, Kastelic returned to Europe where he became a coach and assistant conductor at the State Opera of Slovenia, leading Baroque and wind orchestras. After three seasons, he became an assistant coach at Opéra National de Paris. In 2002, he took up a position as assistant at the Vienna State Opera, where he conducted performances of Das Traumfresserchen, Aladdin, and Mozart's Bastien und Bastienne.

Kastelic has prepared works for the Klangbogen Festival Vienna and the Salzburger Festspiele, and has conducted the TU Orchester Wien, leading orchestra concerts that focused on French and Classical repertoire. He also led choruses in Moses und Aron by Arnold Schoenberg at the Vienna State Opera in March 2007. In 2008, he conducted performances of Die Fledermaus by Johann Strauss at the Music Theatre of Schönbrunn in Vienna.

=== Teaching ===
In September 2005, he was appointed as a tutor at the opera school of the Vienna State Opera. In June 2006, the children of the opera school performed Der kleine Friedrich, a staged work arranged by Kastelic based on Lieder by Mozart.

=== SNG Maribor ===
Janko Kastelic was general music director of the Maribor Opera House from September 2008 until June 2011. In September 2009, he conducted his first premiere, The Queen of Spades by Pyotr Ilyich Tchaikovsky.
