= Anacin =

Analgesic brand

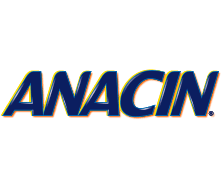
- Product type: Analgesic
- Current owner: Prestige Consumer Healthcare
- Produced by: Prestige Consumer Healthcare
- Country: United States
- Introduced: 1916; 110 years ago
- Markets: United States
- Previous owners: Anacin Company (1916-1930); American Home Products (1930-2003); Insight Pharmaceuticals (2003-2014)
- Website: anacin.com

Anacin is an American brand of analgesic that is manufactured by Prestige Consumer Healthcare. Anacin's active ingredients are aspirin and caffeine.

== History ==
Anacin was invented by William Milton Knight and was first to be used c. 1916 as stated in the patent. Trademarked in 1918, Anacin is one of the oldest brands of pain relievers in the United States. It originally contained acetophenetidin (phenacetin) and was promoted as "aspirin-free relief," but was reformulated in the 1980s following the FDA's ruling to withdraw phenacetin from the market in 1983 due to concerns over its carcinogenic properties.

It was originally sold by the Anacin Co. ("Pharmaceutical Chemists") in Chicago, Illinois. American Home Products, now known as Wyeth, purchased the manufacturing rights in 1930. Anacin was reportedly their most popular product. Insight Pharmaceuticals acquired the brand in 2003. In 2014, Prestige Consumer Healthcare signed an agreement with Insight to acquire the company; it was Prestige's largest acquisition to that point.

== Advertising ==
In 1939, Anacin sponsored a daytime serial called Our Gal Sunday. Their sponsorship spanned 18 of the program's 23 years on the air. Early Anacin radio commercials appeared in radio shows and dramas of the 1940s and 1950s. These "formulaic" commercials usually claimed that Anacin was being actively prescribed by doctors and dentists at the time, treated "headaches, neuritis and neuralgia", and that it contained "a combination of medically proven ingredients, like a doctor's prescription", without specifying those ingredients. Sometimes the announcer would mention that there were four active ingredients in Anacin, one of which was the medicine the consumer was already taking. It also claimed to help with depression. The announcer then reminded the listener that Anacin was available "at any drug counter", and "comes in handy (tin) boxes of 12 and 30, and economical family-size bottles of 50 and 100", usually spelling out its name at the end of the commercial.

Anacin sponsored the first made-for-television sitcom, Mary Kay and Johnny. Unsure of how many viewers would be watching when they sponsored the show in 1947, Anacin ran a simple test, offering a free mirror to the first 200 viewers to write for one. The offer drew over 9,000 responses, overwhelming the sponsor but proving television was a viable advertising medium.

Anacin was also a leading sponsor of the television soaps Love of Life, The Secret Storm and the early years of The Young and the Restless.

Anacin is one of the earliest and best examples of a concerted television marketing campaign, created for them in the late 1950s by Rosser Reeves of the Ted Bates ad agency. Many people remember the commercials advertising "tension producing" situations, and the "hammers in the head" advertisement with the slogan "Tension. Pressure. Pain."

An Anacin advertisement in 1962 featured a mother trying to assist her grown daughter with various chores, such as preparing a meal. "Don't you think it needs a little salt?", the mother would say, only to have her nerve-racked daughter shout, "Mother, please, I'd rather do it myself!" As the mother wilted, the daughter would emote and rub her head, with her inner voice saying, "Control yourself! Sure, you've got a headache, you're tense, irritable, but don't take it out on her!" Another commercial had a wife greeting her husband as he pulled into their driveway in his car; the husband responded by yelling "Helen, can't you keep Billy's bike out of the driveway?!?" These advertisement scenarios became popular and were parodied a number of times, including in the Allan Sherman song "Headaches", the 1966 film The Silencers and the 1980 film Airplane.

Anacin had a large billboard behind the center field fence of Yankee Stadium from the 1950s through 1973, until the stadium's 1974–75 renovation.

== Products ==
Anacin covers a family of pain relievers. There are currently two different formulations:

- Anacin Regular Strength – contains 400 mg ASA (aspirin) and 32 mg caffeine per tablet.
- Anacin Max Strength – contains 500 mg ASA and 32 mg caffeine per tablet.

== Side effects ==
Anacin's side effects may include dizziness, heartburn, irritability, nausea, nervousness, rashes, hives, bloody stools, drowsiness, hearing loss, ringing in the ears, and trouble sleeping.

== See also ==
- Anadin, an Anacin brand sold in the United Kingdom, launched in 1932.
