= Unique selling proposition =

Individual claim that differentiates a product or service

In marketing, the unique selling proposition (USP), also called the unique selling point or the unique value proposition (UVP) in the business model canvas, is the marketing strategy of informing customers about how one's own brand or product is superior to its competitors (in addition to its other values).

This strategy was used in successful advertising campaigns of the early 1940s. The term was coined by Rosser Reeves, a television advertising pioneer of Ted Bates & Company. Theodore Levitt, a professor at Harvard Business School, suggested that, "differentiation is one of the most important strategic and tactical activities in which companies must constantly engage." The term has been extended to cover one's "personal brand".

== Definition ==
A unique selling proposition (USP) refers to the unique benefit exhibited by a company, service, product or brand that enables it to stand out from competitors. The unique selling proposition must be a feature that highlights product benefits that are meaningful to consumers. USP focuses on explicit claims of uniqueness involving an objectively verifiable product attribute or benefit-in-use. In summary:

1. Each advertisement must make a proposition to the consumer—not just words, product puffery, or show-window advertising. Each advertisement must say to each reader: "Buy this product, for this specific benefit."
2. The proposition must be one that the competition cannot or does not offer. It must be unique—either in the brand itself or in a claim that no other advertiser in that particular advertising area makes.
3. The proposition must be strong enough to move the masses, i.e., attract new customers as well as maintain current customers.

== Importance ==
The USP concept is one of the eight broad approaches to creative executions in advertising. The USP approach can be effective where high levels of technological innovation characterise a product category. A clear USP helps consumers to understand differences - even non-existent differences - between brand offerings in a category, and may also help consumers to form a positive attitude towards a brand and may ultimately contribute to increased levels of brand recall.

In order to determine an appropriate USP for any given brand, marketers must undertake extensive research of the category as well as of consumers. It is important to be able to locate a space in the market, ensure that the feature is something that is unique, and also something that is valued by potential customers. Sellers also need to try selling a brand to themselves; this is so they know they are passionate about a product and confident it can succeed. The seller needs a key point to use when trying to sell their product or service, and coming up with it prior to selling will benefit. Having a point of difference to stand out is a major benefit in markets; customers will be drawn to a business if it offers something no one else has. Whether differences are subtle or blatant, they can be the driving force that ensures the end-consumer makes the desired decision in choosing one product over the competition.

In markets which contain many similar products, using a USP is one campaign method of differentiating the product from the competition. Products or services without differentiation risk the consumer seeing them as commodities and fungible, thus lowering price potential. Thus having a unique selling point is essential to have a successful business that can handle current competition, as well as possible future comers in similar markets.

The desktop personal-computer market provides one example with many manufacturers and the potential for new manufacturers at any time. Apple used the slogan "Beauty outside, Beast inside" for its Mac Pro campaign to differentiate its product as "beautiful" compared with any other desktop computer. Buyers of this product were willing to pay a premium price, compared with technically similar desktop computers. Apple differentiates itself with a focus on aesthetics and cutting-edge technologies.

On the other hand, Walmart differentiates itself through its campaign “save money, live better" by having a focus on being the cheapest department store and reminding customers that it's not how much one spends on a product that matters. This USP rests on strong, direct and concise messaging that gives consumers a clear picture of exactly what value they will receive for choosing a given brand or product.

Marketing strategies are very important for different companies to establish their identity and increase market share.

A good USP should target a specific audience. Furthermore, a USP should not only be unique, but also keep its promises in order to prove trustworthy.

== Examples ==
The following are examples of unique selling propositions. What is commonly considered a slogan is enhanced with a differentiating benefit of the product or service. Typically, the uniqueness is delivered by a unique process, ingredient, or system that produces the benefit described.

- Anacin "Fast, incredibly fast relief." In 1952, Rosser Reeves created a TV commercial that capitalized on Anacin's "special ingredient", caffeine, by suggesting limitations of other aspirin and repeating, three times, the differentiation proposition: fast.
- M&M's: "Melts in your mouth, not in your hand." M&Ms use a patented hard sugar coating that keeps chocolate from melting in one's hands.
- Head & Shoulders: "Clinically proven to reduce dandruff." Pyrithione Zinc was found, after 10 years of research, to be an ingredient that was actually effective in eliminating dandruff where other products were not effective. Adding the name "Shoulders" to the product name also indicated that the product eliminated the tell-tale white marks on clothing caused by dandruff flakes falling from the hair.
- Domino's Pizza: "You get fresh, hot pizza delivered to your door in 30 minutes or less—or it's free." 1973-1993 "You Got 30 Minutes" 2007- Domino's uses what it calls the "make line" and other systems to make pizzas quickly.
- FedEx: "When it absolutely, positively has to be there overnight." 1978–1983. FedEx was the first company to specialize in overnight air freight and first to implement package tracking. This pioneering advantage was made possible by a new system outlined in the founder's 1965 Yale paper.
- Metropolitan Life: "Get Met. It Pays." Met "Whole Life Policy" introduced in 1984 was a sales success for the company. The policy offered one-third more coverage, for the same price, and grew in cash value for a bigger "pay out" over time. In advertisements, Met compared buying the policy to buying a home.
- Southwest Airlines: "We are THE low-fare airline."

== See also ==
- Advertising management
- Advertising campaign
- Integrated marketing communications
- Killer app
- Marketing communications
- Product differentiation
- Promotion (marketing)
- Promotional mix
- Point of difference: POD
- Competitive advantage
