= Michael Burgess (singer) =

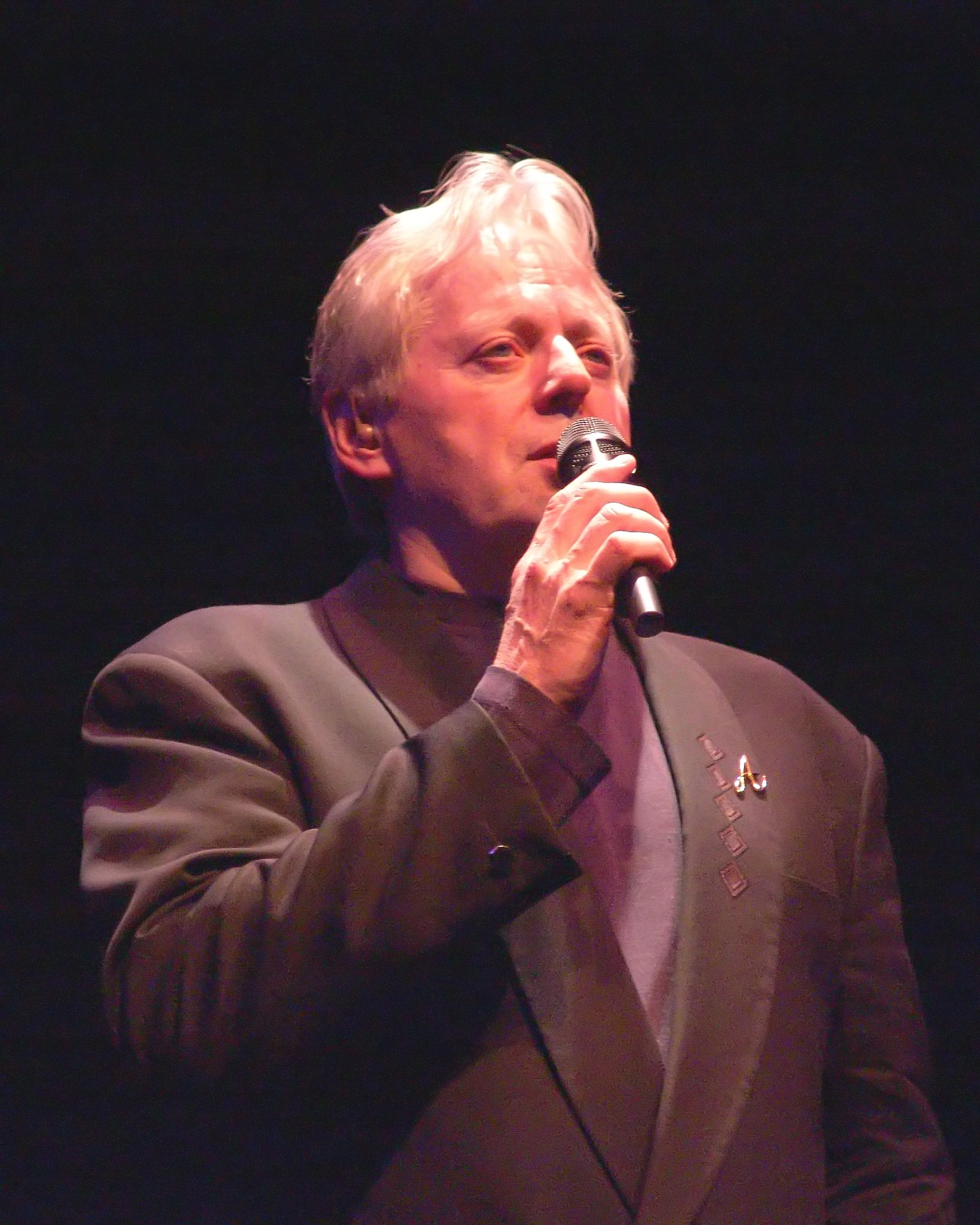
- Michael Burgess, February 2005

Background information
- Born: Walter Roy Burgess; July 22, 1945; Regina, Saskatchewan, Canada
- Died: September 28, 2015 (aged 70) Toronto, Ontario, Canada
- Occupations: Actor, singer

Michael Burgess (July 22, 1945 – September 28, 2015) was a Canadian actor and tenor singer, best known for his portrayal of Jean Valjean in the Toronto production of Les Misérables and was the former anthem singer of the Toronto Maple Leafs.

== Early life and career ==
Burgess was born in Regina, Saskatchewan; his early musical training included education at Toronto's St. Michael's Choir School. He studied at the University of Ottawa.

Burgess appeared as one of the 17 Jean Valjeans at the end of the Les Miserables 10th Anniversary Concert. His other major performances include Man of La Mancha, Blood Brothers, and starring roles throughout Canada and the United States.

He is also known in Canada for his frequent vocal performances of national anthems; he was the first individual to sing "O Canada" at the baseball World Series, in Atlanta in 1992. In 2013, he was made a Member of the Order of Ontario.

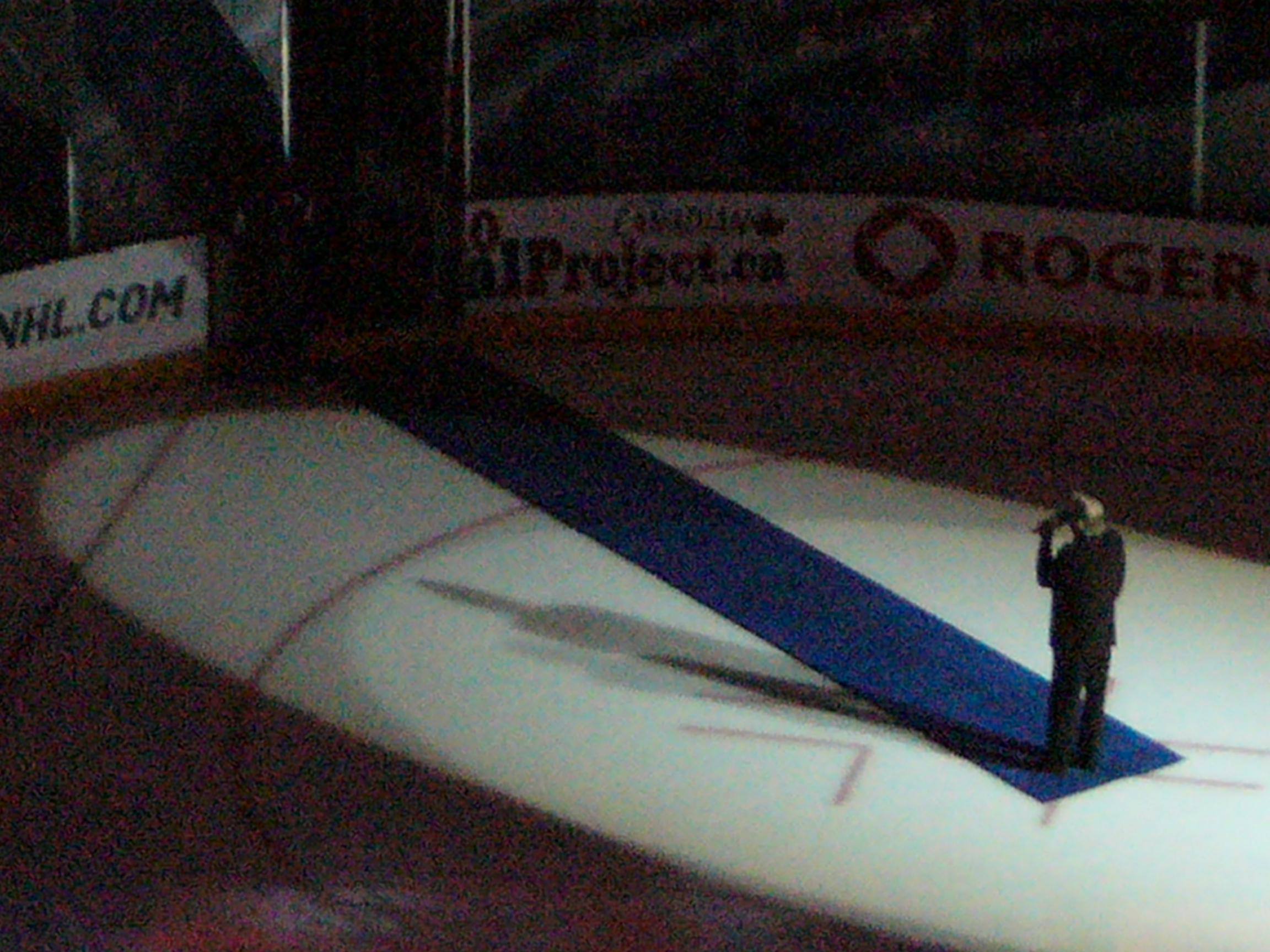
Burgess performing at a Toronto Maple Leafs ice hockey game in 2009

== Personal life and death ==
He married fellow Les Misérables performer Susan Gilmour on October 8, 1994. He also has a son Jesse Burgess from a previous relationship.

Burgess died in a hospice in Toronto on September 28, 2015, from skin cancer. He was 70.
