= He who sings, prays twice =

Catholic expression

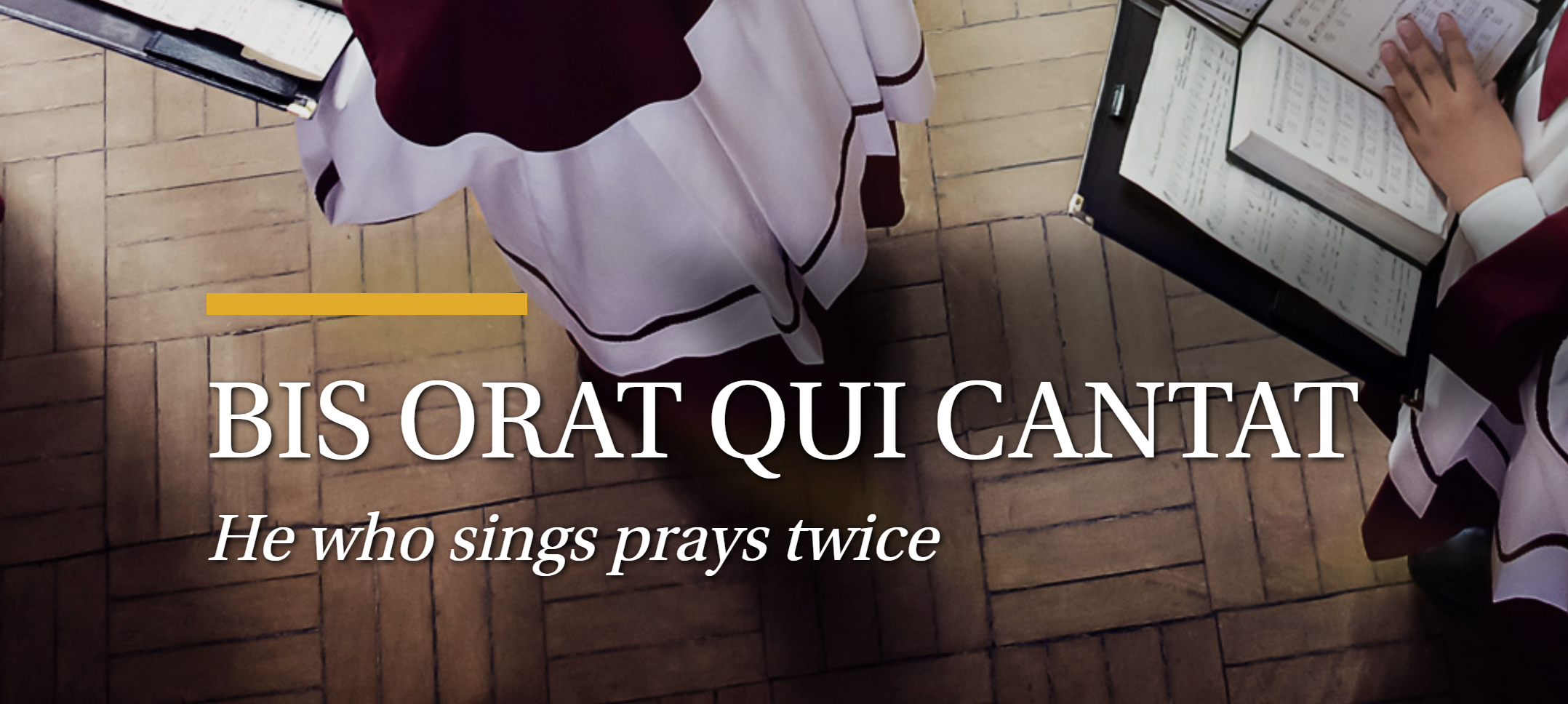
The expression, seen on the front page of St. Michael's Choir School website

"He who sings, prays twice" is a Catholic expression derived from the Latin: Qui bene cantat bis orat, lit. 'He who sings well prays twice'. Despite unclear origins of the expression, it has become popular among Christians, and has been interpreted and commented on by a number of academic sources.

The expression is often ascribed to fourth-century theologian St. Augustine of Hippo, and until recently, was believed to be sourced from his commentary in volume 39 of the Corpus Christianorum Latinorum (CCL). When trying to find the expression's specific Latin phrasing, however, American traditionalist Catholic priest John Zuhlsdorf and others were only able to locate broad reflections relating to singing with praise, meaning the modern phrasing of the expression almost certainly did not come from him. As no known work of St. Augustine contains this exact phrasing, the earliest known use of the expression dates only to the 16th-century. Nonetheless, the expression has become widely known and used by Catholics modern day, being recited by major figures including Pope Francis and Andrea Bocelli. It has also become the motto or slogan for a number of organizations including St. Michael's Choir School.

== Origins ==
For much of history, the expression has been attributed to St. Augustine of Hippo, who himself was greatly inspired by liturgical hymns and music. The expression is believed to have been derived from St. Augustine's quote in Latin "Qui bene cantat bis orat", or literally, "He who sings well prays twice". This statement aligns with multiple parts of the Biblical teaching emphasizing music as a part of faith; with the book of Psalms repeatedly stating to "sing to the Lord", and St. Paul in Ephesians 5:19 to "[a]ddress […] one another in psalms and hymns and spiritual songs, singing and making melody to the Lord". Additionally, modern mass guidance in the form of the Catechism of the Catholic Church (CCC) and General Instruction of the Roman Missal also call for singing in mass, with the former quoting the expression directly.

Skepticism regarding the origins of the expression were proposed by American traditionalist Catholic priest John Zuhlsdorf in 2006 when trying to find the original Latin text written by St. Augustine. Tracing the expression back to what was cited as its origin in Volume 39 of the Corpus Christianorum Latinorum (CCL), Fr. Zuhlsdorf claimed the closest thing to the expression actually read "Qui enim cantat laudem, non solum laudat, sed etiam hilariter laudat", or literally, "For he who sings praise, does not only praise, but also praises joyfully" and that the modern-day expression must've become mistranslated and shortened over time. Others have come to this same conclusion, with another priest named Fr. Horton in 2015 even citing Fr. Zuhlsdorf's research in his own attempts at finding the origin of the modern-day expression, likewise believing it did not come from St. Augustine. Ultimately, he was unsuccessful in tracing the exact expression back further than 1554 in Cantiones Evangelicae, a collection of Christian hymns, and the exact expression credited to St. Augustine back further than the 1940s. In 2018, the weekly student newspaper The Collegian credited the expression to Protestant reformer Martin Luther, a different person altogether, but did not provide a source for their claim. As a result of this confusion, some sources referencing the expression use wording along the lines of "attributed to St. Augustine", "is supposed to have said" or "the old adage" instead more certain wording, as sources which use it in passing are more concerned with the expression's wisdom than origins.

== Commentary ==
When we sing, we use both hemispheres of our brain, whereas when reading or reciting a text, we primarily use the left hemisphere. The music we love and know well also stimulates our bodies and evokes emotions. Therefore, if we pray by singing well, we engage our minds, bodies, and souls. I believe this is why we can consider that in this way we are "praying twice."

— Director of the Choir School of Sainte-Thérèse, Steve Dunn, in an article for the Swiss French Catholic magazine L'Essentiel

A number of academic and other sources have published exegesis on their interpretations of the expression. According to the Swiss French Catholic magazine L'Essentiel, the expression encourages the presence of music during mass, and while taking care that it does not replace prayer, should be sung well to truly meet the expression's meaning. The same article went on to encourage both children and adults to regularly sing as part of a choir or through singing lessons to ensure their singing is "well" enough. The Australian Catholic newspaper The Catholic Weekly used the expression as an anaplodiplosis in an article which stressed the importance of singing in mass as a tool which can increase the beauty, reverence, and personal impact of the liturgy. The American Catholic register Southern Nebraska Register stated the expression supported the belief that "our voices are gifts" which likewise should be used for praise and worship, and can even bring people closer in their faith. The American Catholic newspaper Rhode Island Catholic stated the themes of the expression inspired many in their congregation to participate in more singing-focused masses like "chant mass". The Christian public charity Corpus Christi Watershed took a different approach and stated the expression can be overused, and oftentimes misemphasizes the outward action of singing, and not the interior spiritual formation which they believed must happen first before the outward action becomes meaningful.

== Modern use and variations ==
Modern day, the expression has become widely known and used among Catholics. In January 2024, Pope Francis cited the expression while discussing the benefits of music in combatting the youth mental health crisis. Italian tenor and Catholic Andrea Bocelli cited the expression as in inspiration when singing for the 2020 film Fatima.

In addition to the difference in wording due to translation from Latin, the expression has been adapted into further forms to fit modern needs and ideas. In an article by Caldwell University, the expression was changed to "She who sings once, prays twice" to fit the female-centered theme of the article. In an article by the American Catholic magazine America, the expression was revised to "One who dances, prays three times" to reflect the author's beliefs in regards to worship dance as a part of mass. Another article by the same magazine revised the expression again to "[H]e who makes instrumental music prays at least once!" as a humorous way to describe the creation music for prayer without lyrics which can be sung.

While Catholic sources most often reference the expression, other denominations of Christianity including Anglican and Methodist also refer to it. In terms of official usage, the men's semi-private St. Michael's Choir School in Toronto, Canada, uses the expression as the school motto. The music ministries of St. Augustine Catholic Church and Student Center in Gainesville, Florida, and Gordon United Methodist Church in Gordon, Nebraska, also use the expression as their slogan. The Ohioan folk music group "Strings 'n' Things" first album was also named after the expression.

== See also ==
- Augustinianism
- Liturgical music
