= Victor Togni =

- Born: 15 March 1935; Dar-es-Salaam, Tanganyika
- Died: 29 March 1965 (aged 30) Gananoque, Canada
- Occupations: Organist, improviser, teacher, composer, conductor
- Website: victortogni.com

Victor Togni (15 March 1935 - 29 March 1965) was a Swiss Canadian organist, improviser, composer, and teacher. His compositions received positive reception. He won first prize at the American Guild of Organists' Improvisation Competition on June 26, 1964.

== Career ==
Togni was a church organist in several positions. In Italy, he served at San Gregorio Magno al Celio, Rome, and as the assistant to Fernando Germani, who was the organist of Saint Peter's Basilica in Vatican City. In Switzerland, he served at the Cathedral of Saint Lawrence, Lugano. He was the organist and choirmaster of St. Basil's Church and St. Michael's College, Toronto, at St. Michael's Cathedral Choir School as professor of organ and improvisation, as well as at St. Michael's Cathedral as organist.

In North America, he performed in concerts at St. Mary's Cathedral in Calgary, Saint Joseph's Cathedral in Edmonton, and Christ Church Cathedral in Vancouver, as well as the Wanamaker Organ in Philadelphia and the Cathedral of St. Paul in Minnesota. The concerts that he performed in Europe include the Cäcilienkirche in Regensburg, Germany. Togni performed at the Festival Internazionale di Musica Organistica di Magadino in Switzerland in 1963, where he played alongside Marcel Dupré and Gaston Litaize. The Calgary Herald wrote in 1964 that Togni was "an internationally-known organist". Before he died, Togni was scheduled to play at the Royal Canadian College of Organists' 1965 National Convention, and again at the same Magadino Festival in 1966. He was also slated for concerts at Haarlem, Rome, Paris, and throughout Germany.

The Windsor Star wrote in 1963 that Togni is a "world-renowned virtuoso" and that he "will improvise at length on a submitted theme - a rare and remarkable talent" at the University of Windsor. Precomposed and Extemporized: Rediscovering the Life and Improvisatory Work of Canadian Organist Victor Togni (1935 - 1965), a 2019 publication, assesses the role of improvisation in Togni's life, including unpublished recordings of Togni improvising. These improvisations largely date from the final years of Togni's life from 1963 to 1965, and include recordings of Togni's winning improvisation at the 1964 Improvisation Competition of the American Guild of Organists' National Convention at First Baptist Church, Philadelphia, as well as several improvised works on the historic former Samuel Russell Warren organ of St. Michael's Cathedral, Toronto, the Aeolian-Skinner organ of the Cathedral of St. Paul, Minnesota, and the Festival Internazionale di musica organistica di Magadino.

== Personal life and death ==
Togni was born in 1935 in what was later named Tanganyika in East Africa to Swiss parents.

In France, he studied with Rolande Falcinelli at the École Normale de Musique, with Olivier Messiaen at the Conservatoire National de Musique, and privately with Jean Langlais and Marcel Dupré. In Switzerland, he studied at Einsiedeln Abbey as a teenager; years later, he returned to Switzerland to study with Jean-Jacques Grunenwald at the Conservatoire de Musique de Genève, where he won three first prizes in organ. In Italy, he studied with the Italian organist Fernando Germani at the Accademia Nazionale di Santa Cecilia in Rome.

Togni was married in 1958 to Margaret. Their son Peter-Anthony Togni is also an organist.

Togni won first prize at the American Guild of Organists' Improvisation Competition on June 26, 1964. He won by improvising a prelude and fugue on themes by the American composer Vincent Persichetti. The prize was sponsored by Casavant Frères.

Togni was killed on March 29, 1965, in a car accident. He had been travelling to record an organ concert in Montreal, Québec.

== Works ==
- Mass for the Parishes
- Five Liturgical Inventions
- Alleluia!
- Ave Maria
