= Ted Bates (executive) =

American advertising executive

- Born: September 11, 1901; New Haven, Connecticut
- Died: May 30, 1972 (aged 70)
- Occupation: advertising executive

Theodore Lewis Bates (September 11, 1901 – May 30, 1972) was an American advertising executive who founded a worldwide advertising agency that bears his name: Ted Bates Inc.

== Biography ==
Born in New Haven, Connecticut, Bates attended Phillips-Andover Academy, then graduated from Yale University in 1924. While at Yale he joined Delta Kappa Epsilon fraternity. He founded Ted Bates & Co. in 1940, which evolved into the 21st-century advertising agency Bates 141. His company launched in Asia in the early 1960s after acquiring a stake in Cathay Advertising from George Patterson, an Australian advertising executive. Cathay Advertising was used by Bates as a vehicle to drive expansion in the region so that by the late 1960s, Ted Bates Inc. was operating in Manila, Bangkok, Kuala Lumpur, Singapore and Hong Kong.

== Ted Bates, Inc ==
Bates' advertising firm was founded by him in 1940 as Ted Bates, Inc.. It was purchased by Saatchi & Saatchi in 1986, and merged in 1987 with Backer & Spielvogel Advertising to form Backer Spielvogel Bates Worldwide, Inc.. The company grew to become the world’s fourth largest agency.

In 1994 the name was changed back to Bates Worldwide. Meanwhile, the parent company Saatchi & Saatchi changed its name to Cordiant PLC in 1995. In 1997, Cordiant spun off both Saatchi & Saatchi and Bates Worldwide, and Bates became the primary subsidiary firm of a newly formed holding company, Cordiant Communications Group.

In 2003, Cordiant was purchased by WPP Group.

Ted Bates' creative partner was advertiser Rosser Reeves, who invented the TV commercial, created M&M's brand slogan "melt in your mouth, not in your hand", wrote the first bestselling book on advertising Reality in Advertising, and created the unique selling proposition (or USP) that is still used by marketers today.

TV drama Mad Men took inspiration from Bates and Rosser in the development of their characters.

=== Work for Tobacco Industry ===
A one-page, 1967 Tobacco Institute document is the text of a proposed print ad designed to confuse the public about the link between smoking and lung cancer. It was one of five ads drafted and tested by Ted Bates & Company, Inc. Advertising for the Tobacco Institute in the wake of the publication of the 1967 Surgeon General's Report, The Health Consequences of Smoking.

COMMUNISM CAUSES CANCER

You don't believe it? Well, wait a second. Let's use the same kind of statistical analysis the Public Health Service is using to 'prove' that cigarettes cause cancer. We'll use only statistical facts taken from bona fide population surveys.

1. Americans smoke a lot and some of them die of lung cancer. The Dutch smoke less than Americans, but more of them die of lung cancer.
2. The Australians smoke a lot and some of them die of lung cancer. The British smoke as much as the Australians, but twice as many British have lung cancer.

One statistical inference is very clear. In each pair of countries, the higher cancer rate is in the country closer to the Iron Curtain...By the same means that some public servants are using to indict cigarettes, we've just proved that Communism causes cancer. But you know and we know, Communism is not guilty. And nobody yet knows about cigarettes."

== Personal life ==
Bates died on May 30, 1972; services were held at St. James' Episcopal Church in Manhattan.

== Legacy ==
In 1982, the American Advertising Federation (AAF) inducted Bates with Charles H. Brower and Bernice Fitz-Gibbon to the Advertising Hall of Fame. His creative partner, Rosser Reeves, described the reasons for Bates' success at the induction:

There are two things not commonly known which I want to put on the record today. Very early on at one fell swoop, Ted Bates gave away 90 percent of his agency to his key people. When I asked him why, he said, 'Rosser, I would rather own 10 percent of a success than 100 percent of a failure.' And that leads to the other thing. By making us rich and therefore making us work like demons, Ted built an agency that for the first 26 consecutive years did not lose a client...

== See also ==
- HSBC Fisherman advertisement
