= Robert Pomakov =

Canadian operatic bass (born 1981)

Robert Pomakov (born February 25, 1981) is a Canadian operatic bass.

Born in Toronto, Ontario, Pomakov graduated from St. Michael's Choir School, Toronto, in 1999. In the summer of 1999 he attended the summer conservatory program at the Music Academy of the West. He later studied at the Curtis Institute of Music. He performed at the inaugural Luminato festival in Toronto.

Pomakov's first appeared in 2013 at the Metropolitan Opera in New York as Monterone in Verdi's Rigoletto.

== Recordings ==
- Handel: Apollo e Dafne / The Alchemist, Naxos Records
- European Union Baroque Orchestra under Roy Goodman
