= E=MC2 (poem) =

Speculative poem written by Rosser Reeves

"E=MC^{2}" is a speculative poem written by American advertising executive and television advertising pioneer Rosser Reeves. It was published in the September, 1961 issue of The Magazine of Fantasy and Science Fiction. The poem describes the end of the Earth (possibly from a nuclear war) as observed by aliens on a distant planet. Reeves published a number of fantastic poems under his own name and pseudonyms.

== Style and structure ==
The 16-lines of free verse does not follow any particular poetic structure.
