= Bond Street Historic District =

Historic district in Maine, United States

- U.S. National Register of Historic Places
- U.S. Historic district
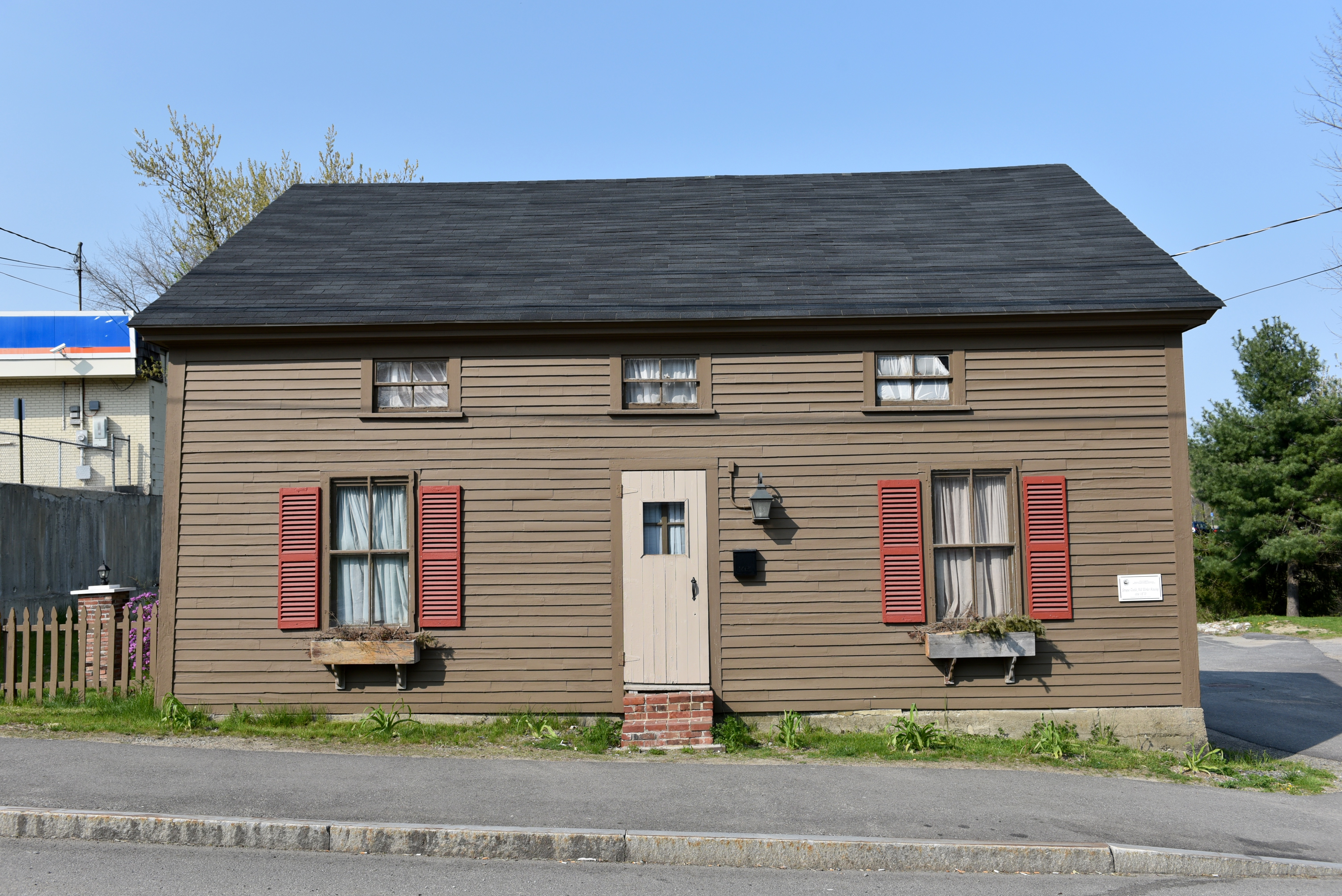
- 25 Bond Street

- Location within Maine Location within the United States
- Location: 8,9,12,18,21,22,25 Bond St., Augusta, Maine
- Coordinates: 44°14′16″N 70°2′12″W
- Area: 1.5 acres (0.61 ha)
- Built: 1878-1884
- NRHP reference No.: 14000137
- Added to NRHP: April 11, 2014

The Bond Street Historic District is a residential historic district on Bond Street in Augusta, Maine, United States. The district comprises seven residential buildings built primarily in 1884 by Edwards Manufacturing Company, which was a textile manufacturer in the area. The buildings housed mill workers and their families from 1878, when the first building was constructed until 1946, when the properties were sold to private owners. The buildings are the only surviving mill worker housing in Augusta. The district was listed on the National Register of Historic Places in 2014.

== Description and history ==
Bond Street is a short residential through street, joining Water Street (Maine State Route 104) with State Street (Maine State Route 27). It is located north of Augusta's downtown area and immediately south of Bond Brook, near its mouth at the Kennebec River. The street is lined with seven 1 1/2-story residential wood-frame structures, noted for the similarity of scale, setback from the road, and generally vernacular style. On the north side of the street are two multi-unit buildings, each housing four units, and one single-family house. On the south side there are four duplexes.

Bond Street is located at the northern edge of Augusta's early development, and was probably laid out about 1838. Bond Brook had been a source of industrial power since the 18th century, and the 1837 construction of a dam across the river (since removed), just upstream of Bond Brook, brought a wave of industrialization and population growth. In 1882 the main mill was purchased by the Edwards Corporation, which was one of the city's largest employers by the end of the 19th century. Edwards, as well as earlier mill operators, all built housing for their workers. These were built between 1878 and 1884; although designed to house seventeen families, the 1900 census recorded twenty families in residence, with a total headcount of 167 inhabitants. This collection of houses represents the best-surviving group of 19th-century worker housing units to survive in the city.

== See also ==
- National Register of Historic Places in Kennebec County, Maine
