= Bond Street (Toronto) =

Street in Toronto, Ontario, Canada

Bond Street is a short street in Toronto that runs from Gould Street to Queen Street East, which is home to some historic buildings and is associated with several historical figures of the city:

- 70 Bond Street was home to Canadian operations of publishing houses, including Macmillan Publishers and Doubleday Publishing and visited by many Canadian writers like Alice Munro, Morley Callaghan, Grey Owl Now office of Butterfield and Robinson.
- Drake Iceman ice sculpture - former land of Drake's large promotional ice installation at the parking lot of 81 Bond Street
- Mackenzie House - 82 Bond Street home to the first Mayor of Toronto William Lyon Mackenzie
- 105 Bond Street - former home of Macmillan, Doubleday Canada Now TMU South Bond Building
- St. George's Greek Orthodox Church - 115 Bond Street was formerly home to Holy Blossom Temple c.1897 and linked to Toronto's oldest Jewish congregation (Toronto Hebrew Congregation c. 1849)
- First Evangelical Church of Toronto (116 Bond Street) c. 1898 - home to many German Torontonians and replaced the earlier German Evangelical Church (Lutheran) c. 1850s
- O'Keefe House - 137 Bond Street home of early Toronto brewer Eugene O'Keefe, founder of O'Keefe Brewery Company of Toronto Limited (later as Carling O'Keefe Breweries); recently university residences and now awaiting reuse by TMU.
- Oakham House - home to architect William Thomas of St. Michael's Cathedral Basilica (Toronto), St. Lawrence Hall Owned by Toronto Metropolitan University (TMU).
- Kerr Hall, Toronto Metropolitan University - site of Toronto Normal School
- St. Michael's Cathedral Basilica and St. Michael's Choir School.
