= PSFK =

Media company based in New York City

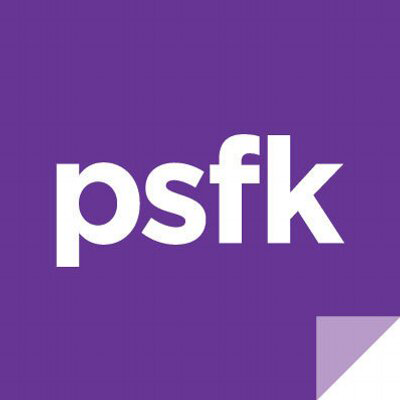
- Trade name: PSFK
- Company type: Limited Liability Company
- Industry: Publishing; Market Research; Business Consulting
- Founded: 2004
- Founder: Piers Fawkes
- Headquarters: New York, New York, United States
- Number of locations: 1
- Area served: International
- Key people: Piers Fawkes (Founder, President); Hedyeh Parsia (COO); Jeff Weiner (Partner)
- Products: Future of Retail Report; PSFK iQ
- Brands: Retail Innovation Week
- Services: Market Intelligence, Conferences
- Owner: Piers Fawkes
- Number of employees: 25
- Website: www.psfk.com

PSFK is an American media company located in New York, New York. The company follows and reports on trends.

== History ==
PSFK examines trends in major corporations. The company does innovation research for corporate clients to determine trends and consumer behaviors. PSFK offers corporations the market research platform, weekly newsletters, and retail innovation strategy including trends research and store design. The retail strategy firm also has a library of many trends research reports.

It was founded by Piers Fawkes in 2004. The name is from the mixed initials of Piers Fawkes and his friend Simon King. Fawkes ran his own website with a blog. He relocated from London to New York and started covering technology and other trends on his blog, which formed the basis for PSFK. He worked as a dog walker and other odd-jobs until he started his startup. His first client was Anheuser-Busch. They had seven employees as of 2011. Clients include Coca-Cola, Target Corporation, BMW and Procter & Gamble.

In 2009, PSFK created a list of the top 10 most "inspirational brands," which included Google, Apple, Zipcar, and other major consumer companies. They gathered the list by reviewing the blogs that PSFK had written over a period of time and then had a panel of specialists review the subjects to create the list. They publish The Future of Retail report annually, which covers trends and documentation about retail sales. Trends they have reported on include circular supply chains, chat-bots, Generation Z, metaverse and retail store technology. Their researchers also focus on omnichannel concepts in which customers that have a seamless experience across different “channels,” like social media, phone and in a physical store.

In 2011, PSFK partnered with former Vice President Al Gore's Climate Reality Project to host a competition seeking video games that could help combat climate change. The results of the partnership were announced at a "Gaming for Good" salon in New York City. The idea grew out of a PSFK report on "The Future of Gaming."

The company offices were located on Bond Street in New York City. In 2013, the company had 15 employees. The majority of their revenue comes from consulting, with the rest coming from conferences, special events, retail strategy reports, consumer research surveys and newsletter advertising.

== Reception ==
Fortune called PSFK a "21st-century re-boot" of McKinsey & Company. However, "despite its impressive client list and growing capabilities it's unlikely that PSFK will threaten McKinsey".
