= Opinion polling on Hong Kong identity =

Opinion polling on Hong Kong identity has been regularly conducted by Hong Kong pollsters on how Hong Kong citizens identify themselves as - mainly as Hongkongers, as Chinese nationals, or both.

== HKPORI polling ==
The opinion polls in this section were conducted by Hong Kong Public Opinion Research Institute (HKPORI) and its predecessor Public Opinion Programme, the University of Hong Kong (HKUPOP). The question asked is: "You would identify yourself as 'Hongkonger', 'Hongkonger in China', 'Chinese in Hong Kong' or 'Chinese'?" ("你會稱自己為 香港人/中國人/香港的中國人/中國的香港人")

The "Hongkonger (total)" and "Chinese (total)" in the graph and table below refer to the sum of, respectively, 'Hongkonger' (香港人) and 'Hongkonger in China' (中國的香港人), and 'Chinese' (中國人) and 'Chinese in Hong Kong' (香港的中國人). The "Others" include "Other" (其他) and "don't know"/"hard to say" (唔知/難講).

=== Graphical summary ===
View source data.
View source data.

=== Statistical table ===
Date(s) conducted between		Conducted by	Sample size	Hongkonger (total)	Chinese (total)	Others	Lead	Mixed identity
2022-12-05	2022-12-09	HKPORI	1,004	66%	32%	2%	34%	46%
2022-05-31	2022-06-05	HKPORI	1,000	71%	29%	1%	42%	42%
2021-11-29	2021-12-03	HKPORI	1,001	70%	28%	2%	42%	39%
2021-06-07	2021-06-10	HKPORI	1,008	73%	26%	1%	46%	42%
2020-12-07	2020-12-10	HKPORI	1,009	69%	29%	2%	40%	38%
2020-06-01	2020-06-04	HKPORI	1,002	75%	24%	1%	52%	36%
2019-12-04	2019-12-10	HKPORI	1,010	78%	21%	1%	57%	32%
2019-06-17	2019-06-20	HKUPOP	1,015	76%	23%	1%	53%	36%
2018-12-03	2018-12-06	HKUPOP	1,005	66%	32%	2%	34%	43%
2018-06-04	2018-06-07	HKUPOP	1,001	68%	30%	3%	38%	39%
2017-12-04	2017-12-06	HKUPOP	1,034	68%	31%	2%	37%	45%
2017-06-13	2017-06-15	HKUPOP	1,004	63%	35%	2%	28%	40%
2016-12-12	2016-12-15	HKUPOP	1,001	64%	34%	2%	30%	47%
2016-06-10	2016-06-16	HKUPOP	1,007	67%	31%	2%	36%	38%
2015-12-03	2015-12-07	HKUPOP	1,011	68%	31%	1%	37%	40%
2015-06-15	2015-06-18	HKUPOP	1,003	64%	35%	1%	29%	41%
2014-12-10	2014-12-16	HKUPOP	1,016	67%	33%	1%	34%	39%
2014-06-06	2014-06-12	HKUPOP	1,026	67%	31%	2%	36%	39%
2013-12-09	2013-12-12	HKUPOP	1,015	62%	37%	1%	26%	43%
2013-06-10	2013-06-13	HKUPOP	1,055	63%	35%	3%	28%	36%
2012-12-14	2012-12-17	HKUPOP	1,019	60%	37%	2%	23%	49%
2012-06-13	2012-06-20	HKUPOP	1,001	68%	30%	2%	39%	34%
2011-12-12	2011-12-20	HKUPOP	1,016	63%	34%	3%	29%	43%
2011-06-21	2011-06-22	HKUPOP	520	65%	34%	1%	31%	32%
2010-12-13	2010-12-16	HKUPOP	1,013	63%	35%	2%	28%	41%
2010-06-09	2010-06-13	HKUPOP	1,004	57%	43%	1%	14%	46%
2009-12-08	2009-12-11	HKUPOP	1,007	62%	37%	1%	24%	37%
2009-06-08	2009-06-13	HKUPOP	1,002	57%	43%	1%	14%	45%
2008-12-09	2008-12-12	HKUPOP	1,016	51%	47%	1%	4%	43%
2008-06-11	2008-06-13	HKUPOP	1,012	47%	52%	1%	5%	43%
2007-12-11	2007-12-14	HKUPOP	1,011	55%	43%	2%	12%	48%
2007-06-08	2007-06-12	HKUPOP	1,016	55%	43%	2%	12%	49%
2006-12-06	2006-12-12	HKUPOP	1,011	47%	52%	1%	5%	44%
2006-06-13	2006-06-15	HKUPOP	1,018	50%	49%	1%	1%	40%
2005-12-09	2005-12-14	HKUPOP	1,017	51%	48%	1%	4%	43%
2005-06-06	2005-06-08	HKUPOP	1,029	45%	51%	4%	6%	36%
2004-12-06	2004-12-09	HKUPOP	1,007	49%	48%	3%	1%	39%
2004-06-07	2004-06-11	HKUPOP	1,027	49%	47%	4%	2%	36%
2003-12-10	2003-12-14	HKUPOP	1,059	48%	48%	4%	0%	39%
2003-06-13	2003-06-18	HKUPOP	1,043	56%	41%	3%	15%	31%
2003-03-01	2003-03-04	HKUPOP	1,035	51%	47%	2%	4%	37%
2002-12-13	2002-12-18	HKUPOP	1,026	52%	44%	4%	8%	36%
2002-09-02	2002-09-05	HKUPOP	1,017	51%	48%	2%	3%	37%
2002-06-04	2002-06-05	HKUPOP	1,067	50%	46%	4%	5%	31%
2002-03-12	2002-03-13	HKUPOP	1,024	51%	46%	3%	5%	41%
2001-12-07	2001-12-09	HKUPOP	1,052	52%	42%	6%	11%	31%
2001-09-13	2001-09-21	HKUPOP	1,025	54%	43%	3%	11%	46%
2001-06-01	2001-06-05	HKUPOP	1,053	54%	42%	4%	13%	32%
2001-03-22	2001-04-02	HKUPOP	1,014	53%	44%	3%	9%	38%
2000-12-04	2000-12-12	HKUPOP	1,040	55%	39%	6%	16%	33%
2000-09-21	2000-09-25	HKUPOP	1,087	64%	32%	4%	32%	41%
2000-06-07	2000-06-08	HKUPOP	1,074	58%	37%	5%	22%	37%
2000-04-06	2000-04-07	HKUPOP	570	60%	35%	5%	26%	36%
2000-02-01	2000-02-02	HKUPOP	566	62%	33%	5%	28%	43%
1999-12-13	1999-12-15	HKUPOP	529	60%	37%	3%	23%	38%
1999-10-26	1999-10-27	HKUPOP	535	55%	42%	3%	13%	40%
1999-08-06	1999-08-06	HKUPOP	596	54%	43%	4%	11%	41%
1999-06-08	1999-06-08	HKUPOP	538	65%	28%	7%	37%	36%
1999-04-15	1999-04-15	HKUPOP	527	63%	31%	6%	32%	33%
1999-02-08	1999-02-09	HKUPOP	513	62%	33%	5%	29%	36%
1998-12-21	1998-12-21	HKUPOP	544	63%	32%	5%	31%	37%
1998-09-29	1998-09-29	HKUPOP	517	62%	36%	2%	26%	38%
1998-08-14	1998-08-14	HKUPOP	526	55%	42%	3%	13%	45%
1998-06-22	1998-06-24	HKUPOP	1,042	48%	48%	4%	1%	34%
1998-06-03	1998-06-04	HKUPOP	544	53%	44%	4%	9%	37%
1997-12-08	1997-12-09	HKUPOP	500	59%	37%	4%	22%	42%
1997-10-28	1997-10-29	HKUPOP	536	59%	38%	3%	22%	43%
1997-09-23	1997-09-24	HKUPOP	512	60%	38%	2%	23%	45%
1997-08-26	1997-08-27	HKUPOP	532	60%	39%	2%	21%	45%

== CCPOS polling ==
The opinion polls in this section were conducted Centre for Communication and Public Opinion Survey (CCPOS). The question asked is: "What kind of people you think you are?" The options were 'Hongkonger' (香港人), 'Hongkonger but also Chinese' (係香港人，但都係中國人), 'Chinese but also Hongkonger' (係中國人，但都係香港人), or 'Chinese' (中國人)? The "mixed identity" in the graph and table below refer to the combination of "Hongkonger but also Chinese" and "Chinese but also Hongkonger". "Others" refers to "Others / No answer / Refuse to answer" (其他 / 無答案 / 拒絕回答).

CCPOS has ended the research on Hong Kong identity by August 2022.

=== Graphical summary ===
View source data.

=== Statistical table ===
Date(s) conducted between		Conducted by	Sample size	Hongkonger (香港人)	Chinese (中國人)	Mixed identity	Others
2016-10-06	2016-10-24	CCPOS	803	24%	12%	63%	1%
2014-10-16	2014-10-24	CCPOS	810	26%	9%	63%	2%
2012-10-05	2012-10-16	CCPOS	819	23%	13%	64%	1%
2010-10-06	2010-10-13	CCPOS	941	17%	16%	66%	1%
2008-10-08	2008-10-16	CCPOS	1014	17%	18%	65%	1%
2006-10-10	2006-10-17	CCPOS	1013	21%	19%	59%	1%
2002		CCPOS	500	25%	24%	51%	1%
1999		CCPOS	533	23%	24%	53%	1%
1998		CCPOS	527	29%	25%	46%	1%
1997		CCPOS	302	23%	32%	43%	1%
1996		CCPOS	769	25%	26%	48%	2%

== See also ==
- HSBC Fisherman advertisement
