= St. Michael's Choir School =

Coordinates: 43.6551°N 79.3781°W

- Latin: Schola Cantorum Sancti Michæle Archangelo

Location
- 66 Bond Street (Garden District); Toronto, Ontario, M5B 1X2; Canada

Information
- School type: Semi-private Catholic combined elementary school and high school
- Motto: Bis orat qui cantat (He who sings prays twice)
- Religious affiliation: Catholic Church
- Established: 1937
- School board: Toronto Catholic District School Board
- Superintendent: Flora Cifelli (Area 6)
- Area trustee: Kevin Morrison (Ward 9)
- School number: 518 / 834718; 518 / 835200
- Director: Geoffrey Rawlinson
- Principal: Martin Clough
- Chancellor: Francis Leo (as Archbishop of Toronto)
- Faculty: 41
- Grades: 3-12
- Gender: Male
- Age range: 8-18
- Enrolment: 270 (2016-2017)
- Houses: Ronan, Hopperton, Mann, and Armstrong
- Colours: Maroon (elementary); Navy (secondary); Gold
- Song: Thou Royal Knight from Courts on High by J.E. Ronan
- Mascot: Spartan
- Annual tuition: CAD$9,500
- Conductors: Joshua Tamayo (Director of Music, Senior Sunday Choir, Tenor-Bass Choir), Victor Cheng (Senior Choir, Senior Saturday Choir), Walter Mahabir (Junior Choir), and Cheryl Chung (Elementary Choir)
- Website: www.smcs.on.ca

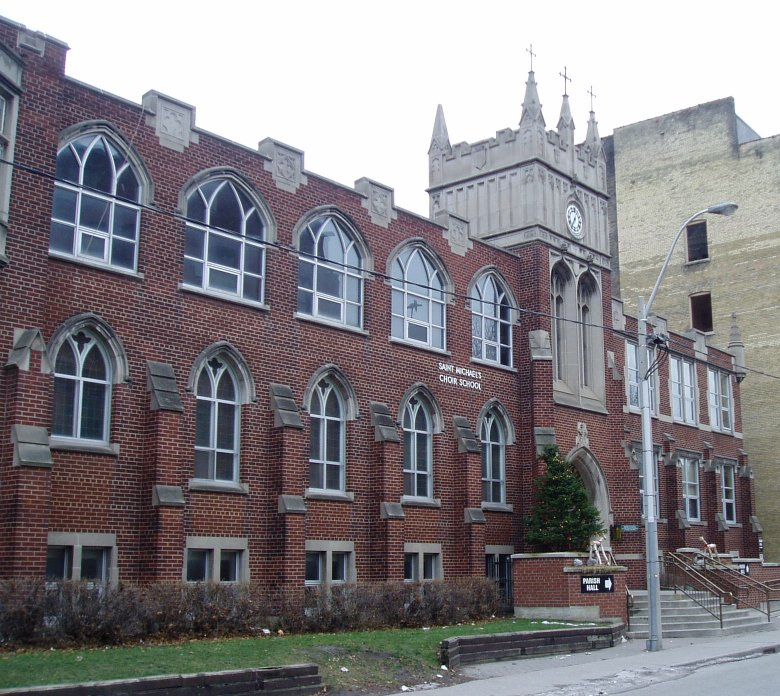
Exterior view of 66 Bond Street in 2005

St. Michael's Choir School (also known as SMCS, The Choir School, or St. Mike's Choir) is a semi-private Catholic choir school for boys from grades 3–12 in Toronto, Ontario, Canada. Overseen by the Roman Catholic Archdiocese of Toronto, the school provides a private music education in joint operation with the Toronto Catholic District School Board, which administers all other academic subjects, athletics programs, and extracurricular activities. The school is affiliated with the Pontifical Institute of Sacred Music and is a member of the International Boys' Schools Coalition.

St. Michael's Choir School trains choristers and musicians in classical and liturgical music through regular choral, music theory, and piano instruction, and optional lessons in music history, vocal, organ, classical guitar, and orchestral string instruments. Admission to the school is by audition and students sing in concerts in Canada and internationally and during weekly mass at St. Michael's Cathedral Basilica. In addition to music and the performing arts, the school's alumni include professionals in business, academia, law, medicine, media, and politics.

== History ==
St. Michael's Choir School was founded in 1937 by Monsignor John Edward Ronan as a private elementary school to train choristers and provide liturgical music services to St. Michael's Cathedral, where Ronan was Director of Music. Then called Cathedral Schola Cantorum, the school's founding was inspired by Pope Pius X's Tra le sollecitudini and started in a single room at 67 Bond Street, Toronto. Monsignor Ronan was a composer and graduate of the Pontifical Institute of Sacred Music in Rome, Italy, and remained principal until his death on October 15, 1962, a date that is now commemorated annually as Founder's Day at the school.

As the school expanded and added a secondary school, it moved into a new building at 66 Bond Street, which was designed by the ecclesiastical architect James Haffa and opened in 1950. In 1955, the school was granted affiliation with the Pontifical Institute of Sacred Music, becoming one of six choirs and choir schools in the world to share this affiliation. The affiliation authorized St. Michael's Choir School to grant the degree of Bachelor of Sacred Music, with a specialization in Gregorian chant. In 1966, St. Michael's Choir School entered into an agreement with the Toronto Catholic District School Board, then called the Metropolitan Separate School Board, to place secular, non-music courses under the publicly funded Catholic school system. In 1975, the secondary school expanded further and moved to 69 Bond Street. By 1987, the school was fully funded by government with the exception of its music program, for which students continue to pay fees. In 1987, St. Michael's Choir School celebrated its fiftieth anniversary, and in recognition of this milestone, Toronto mayor Art Eggleton declared June 15, 1987 as the official "St. Michael's Choir School Day." In 1996, the elementary school moved into a renovated building at 67 Bond Street and left 66 Bond Street as an administrative building, auditorium, and rehearsal space for the school's music division.

Notable school instructors have included composer and piano virtuoso John Arpin, who taught piano from 1956 to 1957, and Canadian Opera Company tenor John Arab, who taught vocal from 1954 until his death in 2000.

=== Concerts and tours ===
St. Michael's Choir School has held an annual Christmas concert since 1939. From 1939 to 1964, Christmas concerts were held at the Knights of Columbus Hall, attached to James Cooper House, before moving to Massey Hall, where the school celebrated 50 years of performances at the venue in 2015. In 2013, CBC listed the school's Christmas concert as one of Toronto's top 13 classical Christmas events of 2013.

Besides the Christmas concert, the school choirs perform during the annual Founder's Day concert in October and the spring concert in May. The choirs have also performed at Roy Thomson Hall and other venues around the city, both on their own and with other musical groups, including the Victoria Scholars Men's Choral Ensemble and the Toronto Symphony Orchestra. The school performed for Pope John Paul II in 1984 during his papal visit to Canada and again in 2002 during World Youth Day. The school choir also performed during Queen Elizabeth's Golden Jubilee visit to Toronto in 2002. In 2017, the school opened the Sistine Chapel Choir's Toronto concert, sang during the Toronto Arts Foundation Mayor's Evening for the Arts gala attended by Mayor John Tory, and performed all three parts of George Frideric Handel's Messiah for the first time in the school's history. In 2020, students served as cantors during the state funeral for former Canadian Prime Minister John Turner, with guests including Prime Minister Justin Trudeau, former Governor General David Johnston, and former Prime Minister Kim Campbell.

St. Michael's Choir School began touring in 1946 and its choirs have performed across Canada and internationally, including in Nova Scotia, Quebec, Newfoundland and Labrador, the Czech Republic, the United States, Germany, and Trinidad and Tobago. The first international tour took place in 1971, when the school choir participated in the Cork International Choral Festival in Ireland, performed in the United Kingdom, and sang before Pope Paul VI at a general audience in St. Peter's Basilica, Vatican City. As part of the school's 75th anniversary celebrations in 2013, the school's choirs toured Italy, which included a performance in St. Peter's Basilica and of "Jubilate Deo," a song composed by the school's founder, for Pope Francis in St. Peter's Square. The 2013 tour was featured in a documentary film by Salt + Light Television. During the papal visit to Canada in 2022, the school performed for Pope Francis at the Cathedral-Basilica of Notre-Dame de Quebec in Quebec City, Quebec. More recently, the school toured the United Kingdom in 2023, Michigan in 2024, Alberta in 2025 and Quebec in 2026.

=== School traditions ===
In addition to concerts and tours, St. Michael's Choir School commemorates Michaelmas, the feast day of St. Michael, on September 29 each year with a Blue Mass given in honour of the city's public safety personnel at St. Michael's Cathedral Basilica. The celebration includes a performance of Thou Royal Knight from Courts on High, the school song composed by Monsignor Ronan in 1942. On November 11, the graduating class provides music for the school's Remembrance Day ceremony at St. Michael's Cathedral Basilica to honour armed forces members who have died in the line of duty.

The school also provides choir services throughout Holy Week, including an Easter Vigil on the night of Holy Saturday. During Tenebrae, alumni return to sing responsories alongside current students in a traditional ceremony where candles are gradually extinguished throughout the service and choristers slap hymnals on pews to create a loud noise in the darkened church. Descended from medieval tradition, the resulting noise symbolizes the earthquake that is said to have followed Jesus's death.

Students are divided into one of four school houses named Ronan, Hopperton, Mann, and Armstrong, which are designed to encourage school spirit, peer mentorship, and student leadership. Each house competes in community events for the annual House Cup award and is represented by senior students known as a prefects. The houses are named after Monsignor John Edward Ronan, the school's founder, Joan Hopperton, the school's first teacher, Kathleen Mann, the first Junior Choir conductor, and Harold Armstrong, the school's first organist and Tenor-Bass Choir conductor.

=== School symbols ===
St. Michael's Choir School is named after St. Michael the Archangel and its motto, Bis orat qui cantat, is translated as He who sings prays twice. The phrase refers to song as a noble form of prayer and is sometimes attributed to St. Augustine. The school is also represented by a school crest, which serves as the school's logo and is worn on students' uniforms. The crest's blazon is as follows:

The three symbols are one. At the center of the Choir School’s academic effort to make the universe (circle) intelligible to growing minds is an experience of music (treble clef) for the praise of God in Jesus Christ (Chi Rho cross).

The school's sports mascot is the Spartan and the school colours are maroon for grades 3–8, navy blue for grades 9–12, and gold. Students wear maroon or navy blue blazers, sweaters, and polo shirts according to their grade level, as part of the school's uniform. The school houses, Ronan, Hopperton, Mann, and Armstrong, are represented by the colours blue, yellow, red, and green, respectively.

=== Controversies ===
St. Michael's Choir School came under scrutiny after 17-year-old student Kenneth Au Yeung died by suicide by leaping from the Prince Edward Viaduct on December 11, 1997. Earlier that afternoon, Principal John Ryall called Au Yeung and five other classmates to his office about a prank involving potentially libellous remarks linking the school choir director to a sex scandal. The comments mistakenly found its way into print in the school's yearbook, which Au Yeung had helped edit. Ryall and Louise Kane, a longtime teacher, called off-duty police officer Const. Christopher Downer, an alumnus who often visited campus in uniform as the principal's "enforcer." During the meeting, Downer and Ryall threatened the students with criminal charges, questioned them without notifying their parents on the grounds that the investigation was informal, and prevented Au Yeung from contacting his parents, which violated school board policy. It was the latter that Au Yeung's mother Catherine testified as a direct cause of the suicide during the inquiry, which made 23 recommendations, including on the mandatory notification of parents during police investigations and guidelines for police conduct off-duty. Downer and Ryall did not face legal repercussions.

The school was mired in controversy over the removal of its artistic director, Dr. Jerzy Cichocki, a 25-year-plus employee and alumnus. On December 28, 2016, the school sent out a letter to the school community from the school's director, Stephen Handrigan, vaguely outlining Dr. Cichocki's dismissal. Following some backlash from the community, the school sent a second letter from Archbishop of Toronto Thomas Collins, reiterating Dr. Cichocki's removal. Further backlash sparked a student-led petition in support of Dr. Cichocki's reinstatement, which was published on December 30, 2016, and earned almost 1000 signatures. The creator stated that "Dr. Cichocki is by far the most qualified candidate to fulfill this noble mission (of the choir school), having had a connection with the school from the age of eight and possessing three graduate degrees in music.” Despite the significant amount of support, the petition was disregarded by the administration.

== School profile ==
=== Academic curriculum ===
Administered by the Toronto Catholic District School Board, St. Michael's Choir School's academic curriculum follows the Ontario Curriculum at both the elementary and secondary levels. From Grade 5 onward, students enrol in the Extended French Program, where they study French as a second language as well as certain subjects, such as social studies, entirely in French. Graduates earn an Extended French Certificate from the Toronto Catholic District School Board and are considered functionally bilingual upon completing the program. At the secondary level, students enrol in classes in the academic stream across core subjects such as English, French, geography, history, religious studies, mathematics, biology, chemistry, and physics, which qualify students for university entrance upon graduation. Graduates earn an Ontario Secondary School Diploma and St. Michael's Choir School Diploma and have pursued post-secondary education at universities and colleges in Canada, the United States, and the United Kingdom.

=== Music curriculum ===
In addition to the Ontario curriculum requirements, students study choral music, piano, and music theory, with the option of studying vocal, music history, and second instruments such as organ, classical guitar, and orchestral string instruments. Administered by the Roman Catholic Archdiocese of Toronto and the Pontifical Institute of Sacred Music, the music program includes daily choral instruction and rehearsals as well as weekly mass duties at St. Michael's Cathedral Basilica.

Students are divided into four choirs based on age and voice type: Elementary (grades 3–4; soprano and mezzo-soprano ranges), Junior (grades 5–6; soprano, mezzo-soprano, and alto ranges), Senior (grades 7–12; soprano, alto, tenor, and bass ranges), and Tenor-Bass (grades 7–12; tenor, baritone, and bass ranges). Each choir has mass duties, but the Elementary Choir, as a training choir, sings only a handful of masses every year. All choirs participate in the three annual concerts (Founder's Day, Christmas, and Spring concerts). Students from the Junior, Senior and Tenor-Bass choirs also participate in the school's semi-annual tours, which take place around Christmas and in the spring, in Canada and internationally.

=== Extracurricular activities ===
Students at St. Michael's Choir School participate in a variety of extracurricular activities through the school's house system. Students also participate in the school community through its Student Council and student clubs, including the Eco Club, Reach for the Top, Social Justice Committee, and the school's yearbook Schola. In 2015, the school's junior W5H team won the Toronto Catholic District School Board's W5H Toronto South Junior Region Championships.

The school supports a varied sports program and offers volleyball, tennis, swimming, cross-country, hockey, soccer, ultimate, and flag football. In 2012, the school's senior volleyball team placed first in the Toronto District Catholic Athletic Association tournament and won a bronze medal at the Ontario Federation of School Athletic Associations provincial championships. The senior volleyball team won the Toronto District Catholic Athletic Association Senior Boys Tier 2 Championship in 2017.

=== Admissions and tuition ===
Due to the vocal and musical instrument requirements at St. Michael's Choir School, admission is by audition only. Depending on the age of the applicant, the admission process can include an academic aptitude test, a music theory test, an audition consisting of singing a song at an appropriate voice range, vocal and ear exercises, sight-reading music, and playing an instrument, and a family interview. The audition assesses the applicant's vocal and musical ability, listening skills, and teachability. Applicants must meet the requirements for enrolment with the Toronto Catholic District School Board.

All students pay tuition fees, which were CAD$8,000 CAD in the 2023–2024 academic year.

=== Rankings ===
St. Michael's Choir School is highly rated by the Fraser Institute's reports on elementary and secondary schools in Ontario. In 2023-2024, the secondary school received a score of 10 out of 10 and was ranked the top school in Toronto and tied for first place across Ontario. The elementary school was rated 10 out of 10 and ranked first out of 2975 schools in the province, in a tie with 12 other schools, in 2021–2022. The elementary school was rated as the best public school in Toronto by the C.D. Howe Institute in 2012.

=== Buildings and redevelopment ===
St. Michael's Choir School is located next to St. Michael's Cathedral Basilica and operates out of four buildings at 56, 66, 67 and 69 Bond Street. In 2016, the school's secondary school building, located at 69 Bond Street, was rated as in need of "critical" repairs and had the worst-performing score among Toronto Catholic District School Board secondary schools on the Ontario Ministry of Education's Facility Condition Index. In 2018, the Ministry of Education announced it would spend $11.2 million CAD to construct a new consolidated school building at 67 Bond Street designed by KPMB Architects. In 2022, KPMB Architects, the Archdiocese of Toronto, and the Toronto Catholic District School Board submitted a new development plan to the City of Toronto for a revised six-storey school design that incorporates and restores the historic Gothic revival-style façade at 66 Bond Street.

== Discography ==
St. Michael's Choir School has produced ten albums to date, as well as music available for streaming on Apple Music, Spotify, and Amazon Music. The albums include:

- Joy to the World (1973)
- This Is the Day (1975)
- Sing Praise to God (1979)
- Sing the Carols of Christmas (1983)
- Shout for Joy (1988)
- The Heavens are Telling (1994)
- Tenebrae (1997)
- Christmas Garland (1999)
- From Courts on High (2008)
- In Midnight's Stillness (2009)

== Notable alumni ==
- Chris Brown, musician
- Michael Burgess, actor and singer
- John Burke, composer
- The Crew-Cuts, vocal quartet
- Matt Dusk, jazz musician
- The Four Lads, vocal quartet
- Stewart Goodyear, concert pianist
- Kevin Hearn, keyboardist, Barenaked Ladies
- Janko Kastelic, conductor, Vienna State Opera
- Kuya Productions, multi-platinum Grammy-nominated hip-hop, R&B and pop production duo consisting of Samuel and Robert Gerongco
- Keram Malicki-Sánchez, actor, filmmaker, musician and media producer
- John McDermott, singer
- Marco Mendicino, lawyer, Liberal Member of Parliament for Eglinton-Lawrence
- Claude Morrison, singer, The Nylons
- Michael Ontkean, actor, Twin Peaks
- Robert Pomakov, opera singer
- Michael Schade, opera singer, Austrian Kammersänger and officer of the Order of Canada.
- Peter Togni, composer
- Alexander Hajek, opera singer
- Darryn de Souza, musician

== See also ==
- Education in Ontario
- List of secondary schools in Ontario
