= Peter Togni =

Peter Anthony Togni
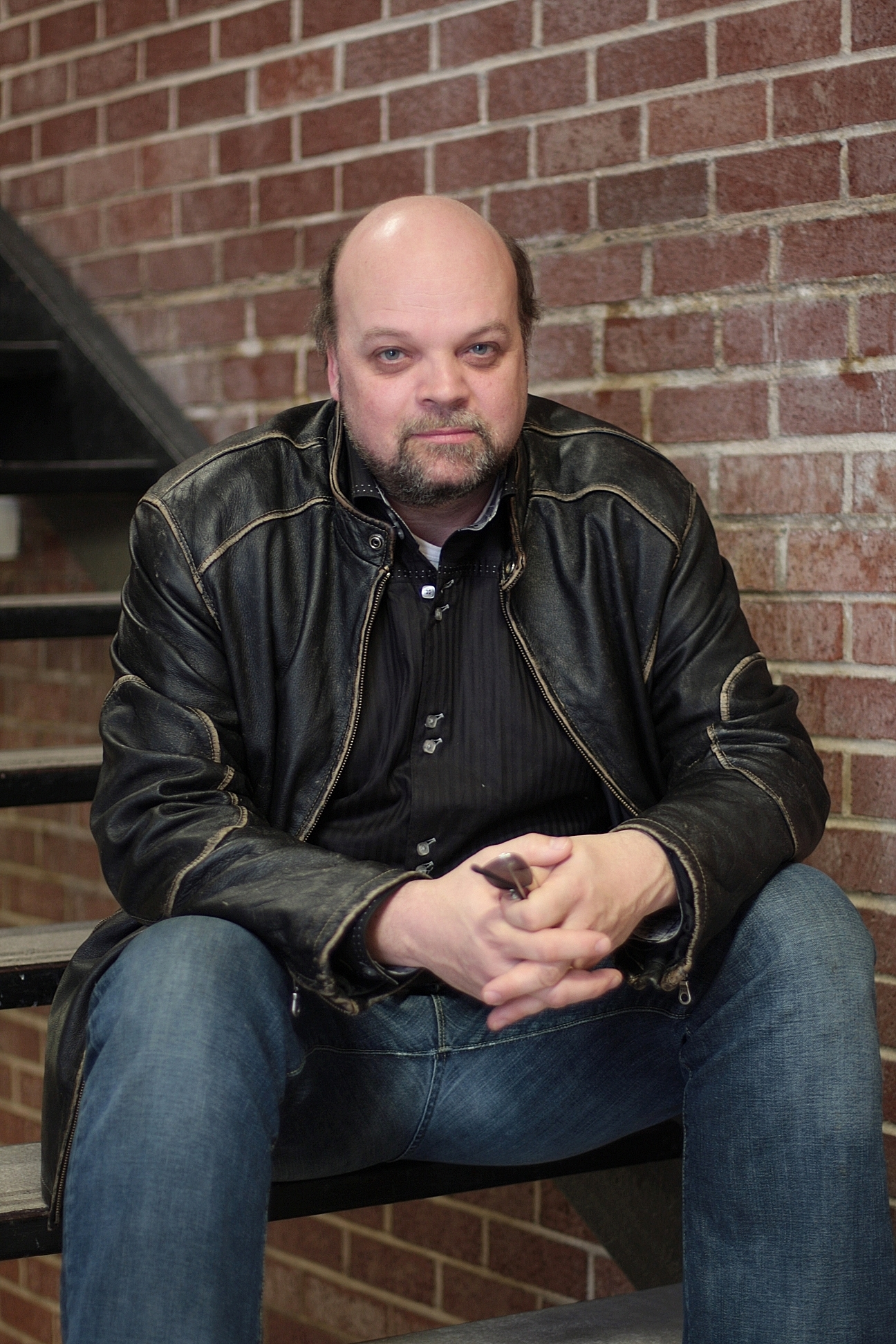

Background information
- Born: September 12, 1959 (age 67); Pembroke, Ontario, Canada
- Origin: Halifax, Nova Scotia, Canada
- Genres: Classical, Jazz
- Occupations: Composer, improvisation, organist, broadcaster, writer, conductor
- Instruments: Organ, Piano
- Formerly of: Sanctuary
- Website: www.petertogni.com

Peter Anthony Togni (born September 12, 1959) is a freelancer Canadian composer and broadcaster based in Halifax, Nova Scotia.

== Biography ==
Togni was born in Pembroke, Ontario in 1959, and is the son of organ master Victor Togni. He spent his early years in Toronto, where he attended St. Michael's Choir School. He later went on to study at the University of British Columbia in Vancouver, studying organ with Frederick Geoghegan and composition with Stephen Chatman. He went on to study organ and improvisation in Paris, France, with the great French organist Jean Langlais. Togni also studied composition with Allain Gaussin at the Schola Cantorum in Paris where he was awarded first prize in composition.

== Musical career ==
Togni's music has been heard at Toronto's Roy Thompson Hall, the Moscow Conservatory, the Oriental Arts Centre in Shanghai, to the Vatican in Rome for Pope John Paul II. His music is broadcast regularly in Canada on the CBC, as well as internationally, on the BBC, Classic FM, Deutsche Welle and Radio France.

Togni's works have been released on XXI Records, CBC Records, Hänssler Classics, and Warner Classics UK. In 2010, he recorded his concerto, Lamentatio Jeremiah Prophetae, for bass clarinet and choir. This concerto was recorded by bass clarinettist Jeff Reilly and the Elmer Iseler Singers and produced by Manfred Eicher. Later, it was released on the ECM label. In October 2012 the Togni Trio's most recent recording, Spatium, was released. Additionally, in 2013, Togni's latest solo CD, Piano Alone, came out.

His composition Illuminations, a concerto for bass clarinet and string orchestra, received a nomination for the Juno Award for Classical Composition of the Year in 2006. In 2011, Lamentations of Jeremiah, another of Togni's compositions, was nominated for both an East Coast Music Award in the Classical Music category and a Juno Award in the same category. It was also a finalist for the Lieutenant Governor of Nova Scotia Masterworks Arts Award in 2010.

In 2012, Togni's work Missa Liberationis, developed in collaboration with the Latvian Youth Choir BALSIS, was published by Musica Baltica. It premiered in Canada performed by Pro Coro Canada. That same year, Togni was honored with the Queen Elizabeth II's Diamond Jubilee Medal, recognizing his contributions to Canadian community life.

His project Responsio, featuring bass clarinetist Jeff Reilly and a vocal quartet, premiered in July 2013. The recording, released in 2015 by ATMA Classique, received critical acclaim and won the grand prize at the 2014 Lieutenant Governor of Nova Scotia Masterworks Arts Award.

Warrior Songs, a piece for percussionist Jerry Granelli and choir, premiered in Boulder, Colorado, in 2014 and had its Canadian premiere in March 2015 with the Elmer Iseler Singers in Toronto. Togni is also involved in the creation of Isis and Osiris, Gods of Egypt, an opera with a libretto by Sharon Singer. The opera, in collaboration with Opera in Concert, premiered in April 2016.

Togni is also a pianist, improviser, and organist. He has given many solo recitals across Canada and in Europe. In July 2015, Togni took part in the 53rd Magadino International Organ Festival in Switzerland, which was co-founded by his late father, Victor Togni. He has also worked extensively in Canada as a church musician. He was music director at St. Mary's Cathedral in Calgary, an organist at St. Michael's Cathedral in Toronto and organist and choir master at St. Mary's Cathedral Basilica in Halifax. He was the organist in the world-renowned trio Sanctuary alongside bass clarinetist Jeff Reilly and cellist Christoph Both. Sanctuary, which was based in Halifax, Nova Scotia, Canada, was formed in 1999, and performed across Canada and around the world, at venues such as St. John's, Smith Square in London, Saint-Séverin in Paris and the Dome Cathedral in Riga, Latvia. In 2008 they were the first Canadians since Glenn Gould to play at Philharmonic Hall, in St. Petersburg Russia. They have also made several recordings including their CD The heart has its reasons for Warner Classics UK, and their most recent CD Estuary, was released in 2015. The Togni Trio, a jazz ensemble with drummer Malcolm Gould and bassist George Koeller, performs throughout Canada and the United States and has two released recordings. Togni also regularly collaborates with artists such as jazz saxophonist Mike Murley and cellist Jeffrey Ziegler.

For over twenty years, Togni has also been a broadcaster, hosting radio programs for CBC Radio 2, including That Time of the Night, Stereo Morning, Weekender and Choral Concert. He currently resides in Dartmouth, Nova Scotia.

== Nominations and awards ==
- 2006 - Illuminations - Juno nomination; Classical Composition of the Year
- 2006 - The Heart Has Its Reasons; East Coast Music Award nomination; Classical Recording of the Year
- 2010 - Lamentations of Jeremiah - Nova Scotia Masterworks Arts Award Finalist
- 2011 - Lamentations of Jeremiah - East Coast Music Award nomination; Classical Recording of the Year
- 2011 - Lamentations of Jeremiah - Juno nomination; Classical Composition of the Year
- 2012 - Recipient of the Queen Elizabeth II's Diamond Jubilee Medal
- 2014 - Responsio - Nova Scotia Masterworks Arts Award Grand Prize Winner
- 2016 - Estuary; CD by the Sanctuary Trio - East Coast Music Award nomination; Classical Recording of the Year
- 2016 - Responsio; CD - Juno nomination; Classical Album of the Year: Vocal or Choral Performance

== Selected works ==
=== Choral ===
- When the Dawn Appears (1989) – Choir SSAA
- Create in me a clean heart (1990) – Choir SATB
- Ave Verum (1994) – Choir SATB
- Psalm 98 (1997) – Choir SATB, TTBB
- Antiphon (1999) – Choral version SATB
- Totus Tuus (2001) – Choir SATB
- Grandmother Moon (2001) – Double Choir SATB & soloists
- Missa Domus Mea (2001) – Choir SATB
- Sacer Dotes Domini (2001) – Choir SATB
- Prayer of St. Francis (pre-2002) – Choir SATB and Piano (Kellman Hall)
- Of the Fathers Love Begotten (2003) – Choir SATB
- Lamentations of Jeremiah (2007) – Choir SATB and Bass Clarinet
- Cantico delle Creature (2007) – Choir SATB and Organ
- Mass of St. Thomas Aquinas (2008) – Parish Mass, Congregational setting and Organ
- Requiem et Lux (2009) – Mixed choir
- Lux Aeterna (2010) – Gamelan & six voices
- Warrior Songs (2014) – Percussion and mixed choir
- Da Pacem Domine (2014) - From Warrior Songs
- Earth Voices (2014) - Choir
- The Final Word is Love (2015) - SATB a capella

=== Instrumental ===
- Tenebrae Litanies (1991) – String Orchestra
- Hymns of Heaven and Earth (String Quartet No.1) (2001) – String Quartet
- Caspian Blue (2004) – Piano and String Quartet
- Lamentations of Jeremiah (2007) – Choir SATB and Bass Clarinet
- O Magnum Mysterium (2007) – Solo Piano
- Solstice Nights (2008) – Oboe D'Amore and String Quartet
- Piano Verses (2008) – Solo Piano
- Personal Legend (String Quartet No.2) (2008) – String Quartet
- Seven Preludes (2010) – Organ

== Albums ==
- Sea Dreams Luminous Voices; Leaf Music (2020)
- Estuary Sanctuary Trio; Independent (2016)
- Responsio; ATMA classique (2015)
- Piano Alone Peter-Anthony Togni; Independent (2013)
- Spatium The Togni Trio; Independent (2013)
- Lamentatio Jeremiae Prophet Elmer Iseler Singers, Jeff Reilly; ECM (2010)
- The heart has its reasons Sanctuary; Warner Classics UK (2005)
- Christus St. Mary's Basilica Gallery Choir (2004)
- Refuge Floating Senses; Hanssler Classics (2003)
- Puer natus in Bethlehem, Alleluia! Elmer Iseler Singers; CBC Records (2003)
- Sanctuary Sanctuary; XXIII Records (2001)
- Shimmeree Peter Togni Trio; Atma Records (1997)
