= John Zuhlsdorf =

American Catholic priest (born 1959)

The Reverend John Zuhlsdorf
- Church: Catholic; Latin Church
- Diocese: Velletri-Segni

Orders
- Ordination: May 26, 1991 by Pope John Paul II

Personal details
- Born: October 28, 1959 (age 67) Minneapolis, Minnesota, U.S.
- Occupation: Priest
- Education: University of Minnesota; Patristicum
- Motto: Zelus Domus Tuæ (Latin for 'Zeal for your House')

Ordination history of John Zuhlsdorf
History
Diaconal ordination
- Ordained by: Paul Augustin Mayer
Priestly ordination
- Ordained by: Pope John Paul II

John Todd Zuhlsdorf (born October 28, 1959), also known as Father Z, is an American traditionalist Catholic priest known for his blogging activities. Incardinated in the Diocese of Velletri-Segni, he lived and worked in the Diocese of Madison from 2014 to 2021, broadcasting a daily Tridentine Mass and issuing commentary on individuals and events from a traditionalist Catholic perspective.

== Life ==
Zuhlsdorf was born in Minneapolis, Minnesota, in 1959. He studied classical languages and theatre at the University of Minnesota. Formerly a Lutheran, he says his conversion to Catholicism was set into motion after hearing a piece of sacred polyphony on the radio. He was ordained a priest in Rome by Pope John Paul II on May 26, 1991.

After ordination, Zuhlsdorf attended the Patristic Institute Augustinianum, which conferred a Licentiate of Sacred Theology.

Later, Zuhlsdorf became a weekly columnist for the traditionalist newspaper The Wanderer, and has appeared on EWTN and the Fox News Channel. Since 2011 he has written a weekly column for the Catholic Herald in the United Kingdom. He is best known for his blog Fr. Z's Blog (previously named: What Does the Prayer Really Say?), in which he comments on Catholic tradition and current church events, advocates for reverent celebration of both authorized forms of the Roman Rite liturgy of the Mass (i.e., the post-Vatican II form and the 1962 Tridentine form), and for the growth of the sacrament of Penance. "The Staggers", the blog of the British magazine New Statesman, listed Zuhlsdorf's site as one of the top ten Christian blogs in the world.

In September 2017, Zuhlsdorf wrote a post titled "Should a seminary headline a homosexualist activist as a speaker?" about a then-upcoming talk Fr James Martin, SJ at Theological College, a seminary located at but independent of the Catholic University of America. Martin became the subject of online criticism, and two days after the post was published, Theological College withdrew their invitation to Martin. The Catholic University of America meanwhile issued a statement denouncing the decision to cancel his appearance.

In January 2021, Zuhlsdorf became involved in a public dispute over live-streaming an exorcism against participants in the 2021 United States Electoral College vote count. He said he had received the permission of his local ordinary Donald J. Hying, the Bishop of Madison, to do the exorcism as it related to the election. However, Hying disputed that statement, saying he had granted Zuhlsdorf permission for the exorcism against the COVID-19 pandemic, and not for political activity.

On January 16, 2021, the Diocese of Madison announced that Zuhlsdorf had reached a mutual decision with Bishop Hying to leave his position of ministry there, and transfer to an undisclosed location. He intended to continue writing his blog.

Zuhlsdorf is president of the Tridentine Mass Society of Madison, Wisconsin.
