= George Patterson (advertiser) =

Australian advertising executive (1890–1968)

- Born: 24 August 1890; South Melbourne, Victoria, Australia
- Died: 19 December 1968 (aged 78); Woollahra, Sydney, New South Wales, Australia
- Occupation: Advertising entrepreneur
- Known for: Agency founder George Patterson Bates

George Herbert Patterson (1890 – 1968) was a pioneering Australian advertising executive who established an agency group that dominated the Australian advertising industry throughout much of the 20th century. His eponymous agency was the largest in the country from the 1930s until the 1980s. Patterson was chairman of the agency from 1934 until 1954.

== Early life ==
One of four children born to John Alfred Patterson (d.1899) and Frances Julia Rogers, he was educated at Carlton College, Parkville, Victoria. His mother died when he was fifteen and George went out to work help support his sisters. He took a position at Thomas McPherson & Son as an office boy, but within three years had become advertising manager.

== Travels and war service ==
In 1912 he travelled to London to see how ad agencies operated there, but he was unimpressed with what he saw of English practices and headed for New York where he worked for a time

His initial attempt to enlist in the Australian Imperial Force at the start of World War I was unsuccessful on medical grounds. He joined the Australian Army Medical Corps serving in Egypt (1915–16) and later with the Australian Army Pay Corps on the Western Front (1916–17). He had the rank of sergeant when was discharged from the army on 3 January 1918 and returned to Melbourne.

== Advertising career ==
In 1917 he moved to Sydney and set up his own agency. In 1920 he met Norman Catts who was a big name in the fledgling advertising industry in Sydney, being elected president of the Second Advertising Convention of Australia in 1920. The two merged their interests into the Catts-Patterson agency which was Australia's largest agency throughout the 1920s. Clients included Palmolive, Ford and later Dunlop Rubber, Berlei, Gillette and Pepsodent.

Catts and Patterson split in 1934. Patterson bought a small business named Griffin, Shave & Russell and formed the George Patterson agency. Patterson was known for an ability to get close to his clients' businesses being a director of clients Gillette, Colgate-Palmolive and later Peek Frean and Hartford Fire Insurance. During the 1930s Patterson researched the latest international trends in radio advertising during his extensive travels.

In 1938 the agency established an innovative radio production outfit – the Colgate-Palmolive Radio Unit – which produced branded content. During World War II it created campaigns for government bonds and troop entertainment programs featuring stars of the day such as Roy Rene, Jack Davey and Bob Dyer.

Patterson worked tirelessly for the Australian Red Cross Society, directing their publicity functions from 1940 onwards. He was a member of the Red Cross's New South Wales divisional council (1940–68), and on the national council (1941–68). He chaired the Red Cross's rehabilitation (social service) and was made an honorary life member of the national council in 1961. During World War II Patterson was an air-raid warden at Bellevue Hill, his home suburb in Sydney. He maintained a savings plan for agency staff who were away on active duty.

== Retirement ==
He retired due to ill-health in 1952 and was succeeded as CEO by his stepdaughter's husband Bill Farnsworth. Farnsworth maintained the George Patterson Agency's leadership position and was at its helm until 1971. Like his father-in-law he was a dominant force and a respected leader of the advertising industry in Australia.

Patterson's autobiography, Life Has Been Wonderful was published by Ure Smith Sydney in 1956. He followed this with two books on trout fishing, Chasing Rainbows (1959) and Angling in the Andes (1961).

== Personal life ==
Patterson's first wife, whom he married after his service in World War I, was Maud Rigby, née Raybould. Born in 1881, Rigby was eight years older than her husband. A widow, she came to the marriage with a daughter. They had another who died in infancy and then a son.

He married a second time in 1961, wedding 62-year-old widow Florence Mary Stonelake, née Mason. Stonelake had been Patterson's nurse. They remained married until Patterson's death on 19 December 1968.

== Accolades ==
In 2009 Patterson was included in the inaugural 12 inductees to Ad News Magazine's, Australian Advertising Hall of Fame
