= Bond Street Theatre =

Musical venue in New York City

Coordinates: 40.72699°N 73.99457°W

Bond Street Theatre is an American theatre group founded in 1976 in New York City. The group's theatre projects aim to educate youth, address human rights issues, provide aid to conflict-stricken communities, and promote artistic values for peace and social development. Actor-educators work internationally in refugee camps, post-conflict zones, crisis areas, and with victims of natural disasters, using theatre to promote healing, empowerment, and social development. Bond Street Theatre is a non-governmental organization (NGO) in association with the United Nations Department of Global Communications.

== History ==
Founded in 1976 by a group of physical actors, in its early years the company used a physical, visual and musical vocabulary to create performances designed to explore social and environmental issues.

In 1983, Bond Street Theatre established the Palenville Interarts Colony, an artists' retreat in Upstate New York designed to foster interdisciplinary collaboration and reach underserved rural audiences. The Colony also produced a community arts project and a Presenting Program, which presented artists such as Dave Brubeck and sons, Eiko & Koma, Bread & Puppet, Talking Band, and others. To bring the community and the Colony closer together, the group created a children's circus with a circus band that toured the county. The circus toured for five years in three counties of New York state. Dave Brubeck and his sons gave the Palenville Interarts Colony and the Palenville Children's Circus two benefit concerts inside the theatre on the Colony grounds.

The Shinbone Alley Stilt Band accompanied the street theatre shows in the early 1980s and performed in New York City. Originally, the performers paraded and played music while characters on stilts paraded around before the show. Eventually, all the company members learned to walk on stilts for the show. The Shinbone Alley Stilt Band was named after the alley next to the theatre on Bond Street, and made its debut with its new name in 1988 at a performance in Nagasaki, Japan. The Band still plays at events in and around New York City.

As the company developed more international ties and incorporated more intercultural studies, the group toured international festivals and theatres. In 1984, Bond Street Theatre traveled to the Jerusalem Festival, where its members were exposed to peacebuilding work firsthand.

In the US, the company maintains an Arts-in-Education program in schools and an internship program.

== Programs ==
The group has initiated theatre and theatre-based programs in over 40 countries, including:

=== Afghanistan ===
In 2005, Bond Street Theatre created Beyond the Mirror, a physical-visual depiction of Afghan history in collaboration with Exile Theatre of Kabul, a theatre group the company had met in a refugee camp in Pakistan. The two groups presented the play in Afghanistan, Japan, Baltimore and New York. The project was the first US-Afghan theatre collaboration, and Exile Theatre was the first Afghan theatre group to perform in the US.

=== Myanmar ===
Myanmar is the focus of a broader artistic initiative by Bond Street Theatre involving ongoing creative work with Burmese refugees in Thailand and Bangladesh. Prolonged conflict between the Myanmar government and many internal ethnic groups has resulted in mass-migrations to neighboring countries. Bond Street Theatre created a play with the Gitameit Music School combining traditional and modern forms of Burmese theatre with its physical-visual theatre style to perform in Myanmar and the surrounding refugee areas.

In 2009–2010, Bond Street Theatre worked as US State Department Cultural Envoys in Myanmar with Thila Min of Thukhuma Khayeethe (Art Travelers) Theatre. They created and performed The Handwashing Show, designed to stress hygiene's importance. The show traveled to monastery schools and jungle villages near the Myanmar–Thailand border.

=== India ===
Bond Street Theatre collaborated on a theatre-based project for populations in India with the Indian theatre group, Purvabhyas Theatre, and Exile Theatre of Afghanistan. The three-country team (US-Afghanistan-India) worked with rural women to encourage self-expression and confidence, with street-working children to initiate non-violent "life skills," and with youth to explore the nature of ethnic and religious disputes. The US Bureau of Educational and Cultural Affairs (US Department of State) sponsored the multi-year project.

In cooperation with UNICEF, Bond Street Theatre created the South Asia Social Theatre Institute (SASTI) at the Gandhi Center in Delhi as a center for study and training in theatre-based approaches to leadership, conflict prevention, healing, and the transfer of information.

=== The Balkans ===
In the summer of 2000, one year after the war devastated Kosovo, Bond Street Theatre collaborated with Theatre Tsvete, an award-winning puppet theatre company from Bulgaria, to create a non-verbal version of Romeo & Juliet. Both companies met while performing in the Kosovar refugee camps the prior year. The two companies performed their collaborative "Romeo & Juliet" in theatres across Kosovo in 2000 and in Serbia, Albania, Bosnia & Herzegovina, Macedonia, Romania, Croatia and Bulgaria in the following years.

=== Performing Artists for Balkan Peace ===
In 2005, Bond Street Theatre and Theatre Tsvete initiated Performing Artists for Balkan Peace, a network of professional theatre companies, individual performing artists, and other theatre practitioners working for peace, social progress, and artistic cooperation through the performing arts. Performing Artists for Balkan Peace includes theatre practitioners from ten companies from Albania, Bosnia and Herzegovina, Kosovo, Serbia, Macedonia, Bulgaria, Greece, England and the United States. Their first collaborative production, Honey and Blood, performed in Blagoevgrad and Sofia, Bulgaria in 2005 and at the International Festival of Authorial Poetics in Mostar, Bosnia and Herzegovina in 2006.

=== Young Audiences Program ===
The company's programs for young audiences are designed to explore world arts and cultures, historical figures, the relationship between math and music, and other curricula topics. The Young Audience Program is presented in New York City public schools, libraries, and city parks.

== Awards ==
Bond Street Theatre received an award from The John D. and Catherine T. MacArthur Foundation in 1990.
