= Ivan Camilleri =

His Excellency, The Most Reverend Ivan Philip Camilleri
- Titular Bishop of Teglata in Numidia; Auxiliary Bishop of Toronto
- Church: Catholic Church
- Diocese: Toronto
- Appointed: November 28, 2020

Orders
- Ordination: May 12, 2007 by Thomas Christopher Collins
- Consecration: January 26, 2021 by Thomas Christopher Collins

Personal details
- Born: April 18, 1969 (age 57) Sliema, Malta
- Denomination: Roman Catholicism
- Education: Laurentian University; Edinburgh Business School; St. Augustine's Seminary; The Catholic University of America
- Coat of arms

Ordination history of Ivan Camilleri
History
Priestly ordination
- Ordained by: Thomas Christopher Collins
Episcopal consecration
- Principal consecrator: Thomas Christopher Collins
- Co-consecrators: John Boissoneau and Vincent Nguyen

Ivan Philip Camilleri (born April 18, 1969) is a Maltese-Canadian prelate of the Catholic Church who currently serves as an auxiliary bishop of the Archdiocese of Toronto, having been appointed to the position in 2020. Before becoming a priest, he worked at Bell Canada Enterprises as an associate director of finance, and at Nortel and Marconi Canada.

== Early life, education, and career ==
Camilleri was born in Sliema, Malta, on April 18, 1969. His family moved to Canada in 1980, when he was eleven, and he attended Philip Pocock Catholic Secondary School in Mississauga. Camilleri went on to study at Laurentian University, obtaining a Bachelor of Commerce in 1991. Two years later, he earned a Master of Business Administration from the Edinburgh Business School.

He subsequently worked at Bell Canada Enterprises, Nortel, and Marconi, in various management positions in finance. Beginning in 2001, he attended St. Augustine's Seminary in Scarborough. On May 12, 2007, he was ordained to the Catholic priesthood at St. Michael's Cathedral Basilica by Thomas Christopher Collins, the Archbishop of Toronto at the time.

== Presbyteral ministry ==
Camilleri's first pastoral assignment was as associate pastor at Merciful Redeemer Parish in Mississauga. After serving there for two years, he undertook studies at The Catholic University of America's School of Canon Law in Washington, D.C., graduating with a Licentiate of Canon Law from that institution in 2011. Upon his return to Toronto, he was appointed as vice-chancellor, before being elevated to chancellor in 2012. He became vicar general of the Archdiocese and Moderator of its curia the following year. He also served as the defender of the bond and judge on the archdiocesan matrimonial court, as well as a sessional lecturer at St. Augustine's Seminary (his alma mater).

== Episcopal ministry ==
Camilleri was appointed auxiliary bishop of Toronto and titular bishop of Teglata in Numidia on November 28, 2020. He was ordained to the episcopacy on January 25, 2021, the Feast of the Conversion of St. Paul the Apostle at St. Michael's Cathedral Basilica (Toronto) with Cardinal Thomas Christopher Collins, Archbishop of Toronto as principal-consecrator and bishops John Boissoneau and Vincent Nguyen, auxiliary bishops of Toronto as co-consecrators. The episcopal ordination was only celebrated with ten-people present inside the Cathedral due to the restrictions in Ontario due to the COVID-19 pandemic. However, the Episcopal Ordination was livestreamed, allowing the family of the bishops and the clergy and faithful to join in prayer in the ordination rites and Eucharistic celebration.
