= Robert Kasun =

Canadian Catholic auxiliary bishop

His Excellency, the Most Reverend Robert Kasun CSB
- Auxiliary Bishop of Toronto; Titular Bishop of Lavellum
- Diocese: Archdiocese of Toronto

Orders
- Ordination: 24 June 1978
- Consecration: 12 September 2016 by Thomas Christopher Collins

Personal details
- Born: Robert Michael Kasun; 20 December 1951 (age 74) Cudworth, Saskatchewan, Canada
- Denomination: Catholic Church
- Education: University of Toronto (MDiv); University of St. Michael's College (MEd)
- Motto: To bring good news to the poor
- Coat of arms

Styles of Robert Kasun
- Reference style: His Excellency, The Most Reverend
- Spoken style: The Most Reverend

Robert Michael Kasun CSB (born 20 December 1951) is a Catholic auxiliary bishop of the Archdiocese of Toronto and Titular Bishop of Lavellum.

== Early life and education ==
Kasun was born in Cudworth, Saskatchewan, and received a bachelor's degree in English at St. Thomas More College in Saskatoon. He joined the Congregation of Saint Basil, and was awarded a Master of Divinity by the University of St. Michael's College. He later attended the University of Toronto and received Bachelor of Education (BEd) and Master of Education (MEd). He was ordained a priest in the Congregation of Saint Basil on 24 June 1978.

== Priesthood ==
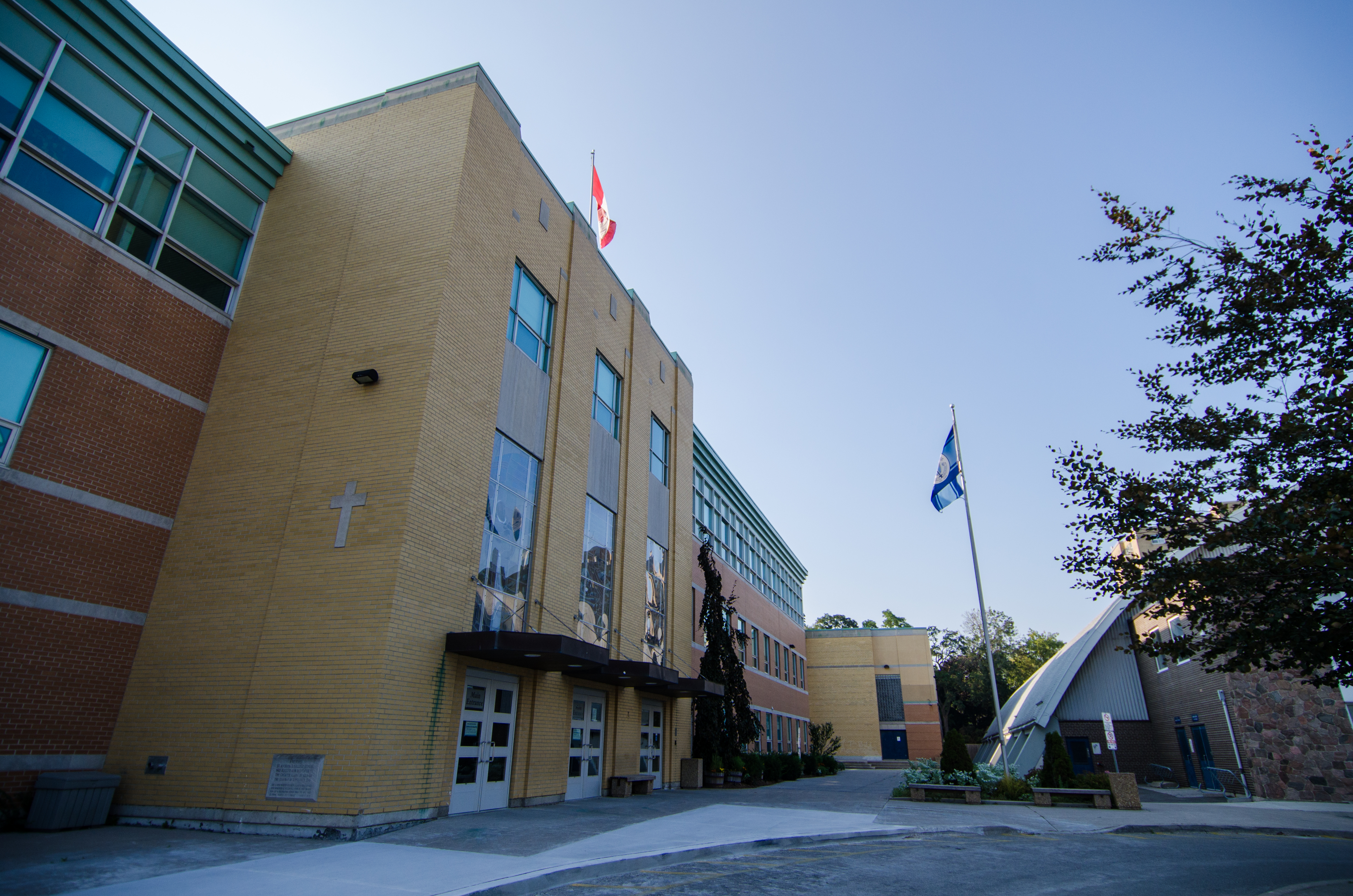
St. Michael's College School, where Kasun worked as a teacher

Kasun taught at Basilian schools in Merrillville, Indiana, and Sudbury, Ontario, before he was appointed to teach at St. Michael's College School in Toronto. After moving to teach at St. Francis High School in Calgary, he served on the General Council of the Basilian Fathers from 1989 to 1997. From 2001 -2009. Kasun was the Parish Priest of St Thomas More Parish in Calgary Alberta.

From 2009, Kasun served as a secular priest in the Archdiocese of Edmonton, ministering at two inner-city parishes in Edmonton. As pastor in Edmonton, Kasun sought to increase fundraising for the local homeless population and advocated for the Sudanese diaspora to maintain celebration of Mass in Dinka and with their cultural elements so long as they followed the General Instruction of the Roman Missal. Kasun also work on an abuse prevention program in Edmonton, facing a backlash from parishioners for implementing "strict" rules that required windows in every room and multiple adults in Sunday school classes. Efforts by Kasun and others led to the Archdiocese of Toronto receiving Praesidium Accreditation certifying a high standard of abuse prevention.

== Episcopal ministry ==
On 17 June 2016, Kasun was appointed as an auxiliary bishop of the Archdiocese of Toronto by Pope Francis. He was consecrated as bishop on 12 September 2016, by Cardinal Thomas Christopher Collins, joined by co-consecrators Archbishop John Michael Miller and Bishop Ronald Peter Fabbro. According to Kasun, among his first reactions to learning of Francis's intent to elevate him as a bishop was "I’ve never in my life done anything extraordinary. I’m just an ordinary simple pastor." He chose "To bring good news to the poor" as his episcopal motto, in reference to Luke 4:18.

Kasun was officially welcomed to the archdiocese through a Mass at St. Michael's Cathedral, Toronto, on 6 October 2016. As an auxiliary bishop, Kasun has presided over liturgies on behalf of the Chinese Canadians and Goan Catholics in the archdiocese. During the COVID-19 pandemic, Kasun and fellow auxiliary bishop Vincent Nguyen filled the responsibility of ministering to the northern portion of the archdiocese in the absence of an additional auxiliary bishop.
