= St. Mary's Cathedral (Calgary) =

Catholic cathedral in Alberta, Canada

Coordinates: 51°02′15″N 114°03′58″W

- The Cathedral of the Immaculate Conception of the Blessed Virgin Mary
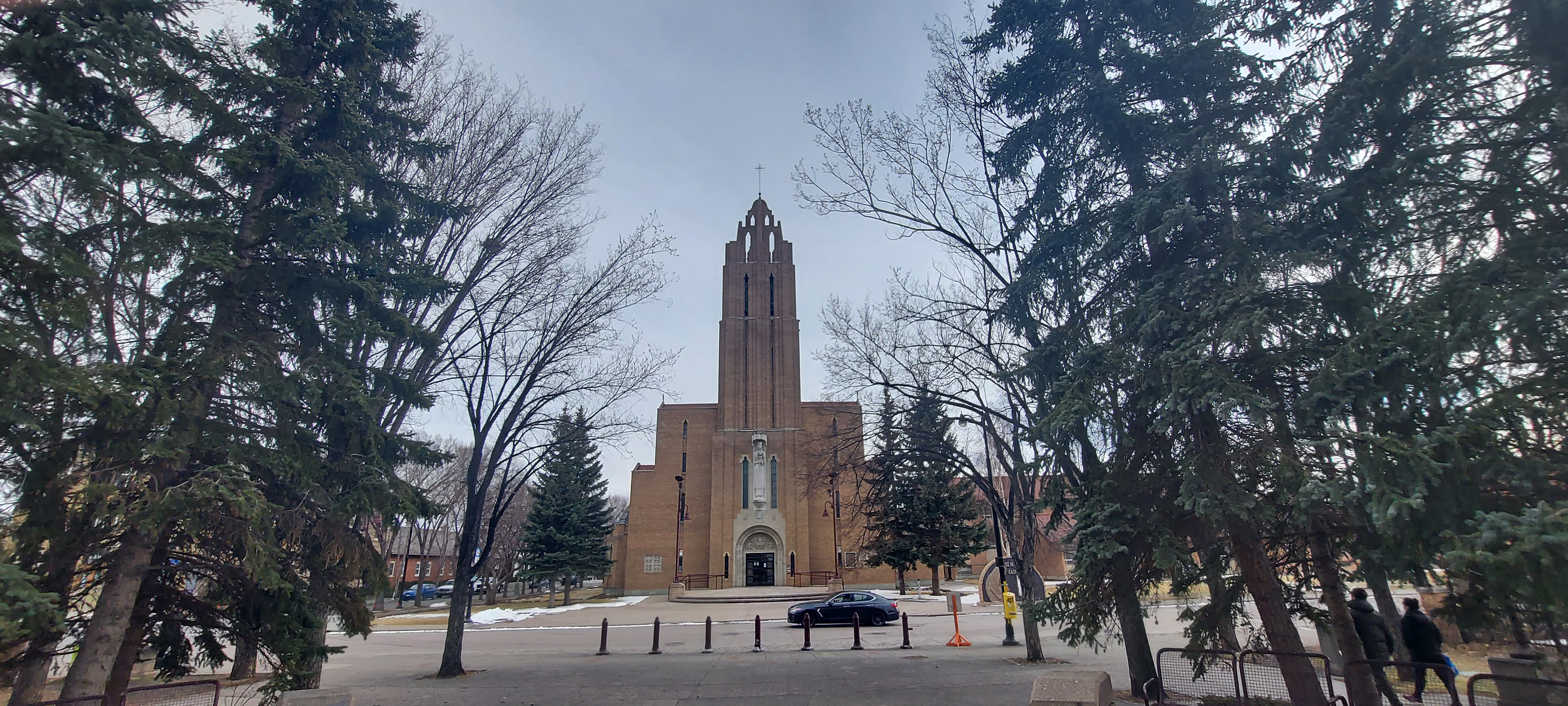
- The cathedral on 2022
- St. Mary's Cathedral
- Location: 219 18th Avenue SW; Calgary, Alberta
- Country: Canada
- Denomination: Catholic Church

History
- Status: Cathedral
- Founded: As sandstone church in 1889
- Dedication: October 30, 1955
- Dedicated: February 1957,
- Consecrated: December 11, 1957

Architecture
- Functional status: Active
- Architectural type: Norman-Gothic

Administration
- Diocese: Calgary

St. Mary's Cathedral in Calgary, Alberta, Canada is a Catholic cathedral and the seat of the Diocese of Calgary. The building's full name is The Cathedral of the Immaculate Conception of the Blessed Virgin Mary.

== History ==
St. Mary's began as a sandstone church in 1889, built near the Elbow River on land provided by the Canadian Pacific Railway. The area was called the Mission District, due to the settlement of Father Albert Lacombe in the area in 1884. The original Catholic mission was called Notre-Dame-de-la-Paix. The land was used to establish a French-speaking incorporated village called Rouleauville, which subsequently became overwhelmingly English and was annexed by Calgary in 1907 (making St. Mary's part of Calgary). The same land obtained by Lacombe was also used to build St. Mary's School nearby.

When Pope Pius X created the Diocese of Calgary November 30, 1912, St. Mary’s became the cathedral as the seat of the Bishop.

Demolition of the sandstone cathedral began on July 21, 1955, and on October 30, 1955, the cornerstone for the cathedral was laid. Construction completed in February 1957, and the Most Reverend Francis P. Carroll, Bishop of Calgary, consecrated the sanctuary December 11, 1957.

== Architecture ==
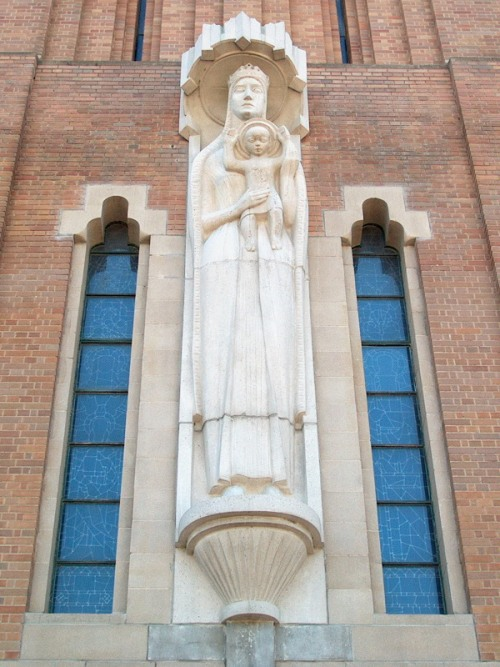
A 4.9 metres (16 ft) statue of the Virgin Mary with Child occupies a niche atop the cathedral's entrance

The building was designed by architects Maxwell Bates, and Alfred Hodges; with Jan Bobrowski and Partners as the project engineers. Bird Construction Company Ltd. was contracted to building the cathedral. The total cost of which was C$1,000,000.

The cathedral is built of brick with sandstone accents in a Gothic Revival style. The floor plan is a St. Anthony's Cross (T or Tau-shaped) rather than the usual Latin cross that forms most Western Christian churches. A 4.9-metre (16 ft) statue of the Virgin Mary with Child in stone, by the Calgary sculptor Luke Lindoe occupies a niche above the main entrance.

Senator Pat Burns donated four 750-pound (340 kg) bells in to the church in 1904 that were cast by the Paccard Foundry in Annecy, France. These bells are the only parts from the old building used in the construction of the new cathedral.

The tabernacle, chalices, monstrance, candle holders and sanctuary lamp were all designed and cast by Gunning and Son Bronze Works of Dublin. The pulpit was designed by the architects and built from hand carved oak by the Globe Furniture Company of Waterloo, Ontario. The carvings depict the figures of Christ and the four major prophets: Isaiah, Jeremiah, Ezechiel and Daniel.

The stained glass throughout the cathedral was commissioned from Franz Mayer & Co. of Munich.
