= St. Peter's Seminary (Canada) =

Seminary in London, Ontario, Canada

Coordinates: 43.0121°N 81.2528°W

- Motto: "I will give you shepherds according to mine own heart": Jeremiah 3:15
- Type: Theological college and seminary
- Established: 1912
- Affiliations: Kings University College, Western University, ATS
- Religious affiliation: Roman Catholic
- Rector: Father Peter Keller
- Dean: Dr. John Dool
- Location: 1040 Waterloo Street; London, Ontario; N6A 3Y1
- Campus: Urban / suburban
- Colours: Blue and gold
- Website: stpetersseminary.ca

St. Peter's Seminary is a Roman Catholic seminary located in the Diocese of London, Ontario, Canada. The seminary is a fully accredited member of the Association of Theological Schools of the United States and Canada. St. Peter's Seminary is the major seminary of the Roman Catholic Diocese of London in Ontario. It is affiliated with King's University College, a Catholic affiliate of the University of Western Ontario. The current rector of St. Peter's Seminary is Father Peter Keller.

St. Peter's Seminary is Canada's oldest English-speaking Roman Catholic diocesan seminary. Since it was founded by the Diocese of London in 1912, the seminary has produced more than 1,000 priests (including 23 who became bishops) and has educated permanent deacons and lay graduates.

== History ==
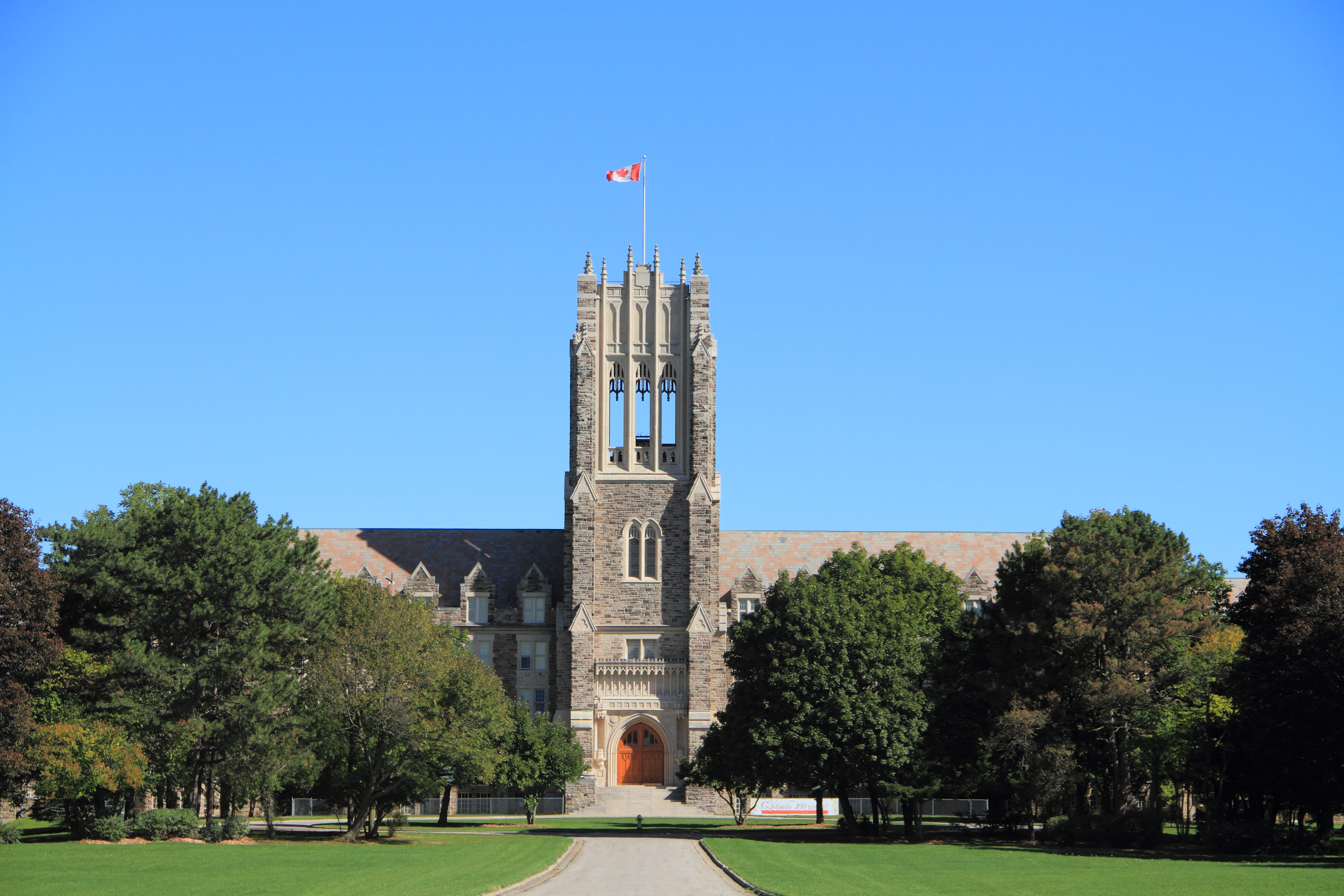
Seminary building c. 2012

=== Founding ===
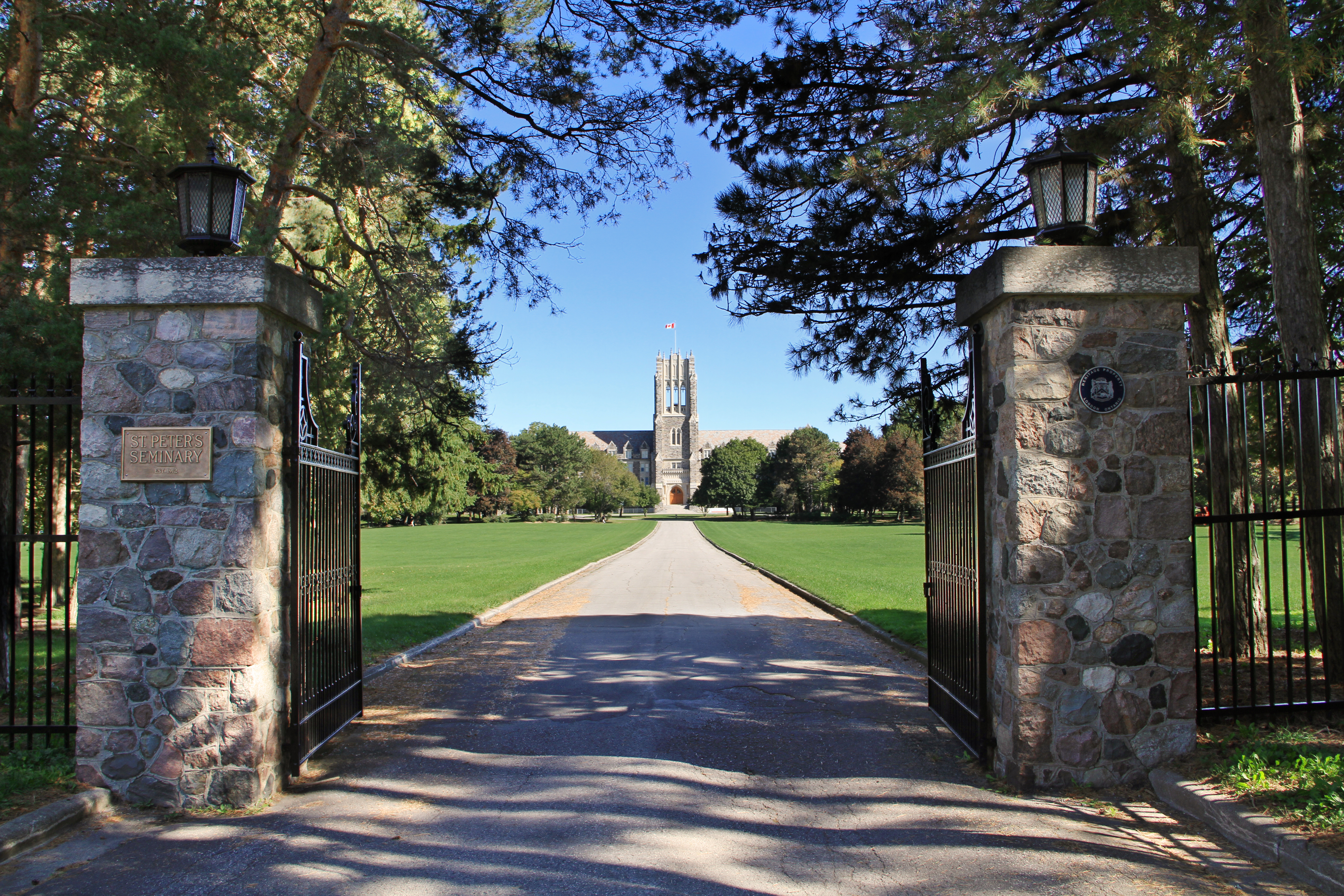
Gates of St. Peter's Seminary c. 2012

St. Peter's seminary was founded by Michael F. Fallon, who was the bishop of London at the time. The seminary opened its doors on September 15, 1912. The students were initially housed and taught in the Bishop's Residence, which later became the rectory of St. Peter's Cathedral Basilica. However, this building is no longer present.

The 25-acre riverside site on which the seminary stands was donated by Sir Philip Pocock, from a prominent London Catholic family. The seminary is constructed of Credit Valley stone, and is designed in the Collegiate Gothic style. The cornerstone of the present building was laid by Bishop Fallon on May 31, 1925, and the official opening of the St. Peter's Seminary building was celebrated on September 29, 1926. The main entrance rotunda features a marble statue of St. Michael the archangel, carved in Rome and presented from Bishop Fallon upon the seminary's opening.

=== Expansion ===
The Chapel of St. Thomas Aquinas was dedicated on June 18, 1930. A new wing was added to the building in 1957, which houses the auditorium, library and recreational facilities. In 1968 the chapel was renovated. The seminary interior was renovated in 1970. In 1983 the library was doubled in size, and the main floor of the building renovated. In 1987 St. Peter's Seminary purchased the St. Thomas Scholasticate, the former house of formation for students of the Congregation of the Resurrection. The renovated and newly named Aquinas House was opened on the 27 October 1991 and housed transitional deacons in the formation program. Aquinas House currently houses workshops in formation, summer institutes, retreats and other programs for ministry.

=== Renovation ===
Bishop Ronald Fabbro, Bishop of London, announced that St. Peter's Seminary would undergo a full modernization and restoration in 2015. The renovations were to upgrade the interior, including 60 seminarian rooms, as well as new faculty suites, offices, classrooms, and common spaces. In addition, the exterior stonewalls and slate roof were restored, and modern heating and cooling systems were installed. The $30-million renovation was funded by a $23-million contribution from the Roman Catholic Diocese of Hamilton, and $7 million of revenue generated from the seminary's land sale to King's University College.

== Programs ==
These programs are currently offered at St. Peter's Seminary:

=== Degree programs ===
- Bachelor of Arts Program in Philosophy through King's University College
- Theology Degree Programs
  - Master of Divinity Advanced (M.Div advanced)
  - Master of Divinity (M.Div)
  - Master of Theological Studies (MTS)

=== Non-degree programs ===
- Lay Leadership Program
- Breaking Forth Certificate Programs

=== Diocesan programs ===
- The Permanent Diaconate Program

== St. Peter's Seminary Foundation ==
St. Peter's Seminary Foundation is a public charitable organization whose sole purpose is to fundraise for St. Peter's Seminary so as to help build its faith and its future. The foundation does this by acting as a vehicle for fundraising, creating conditions for effective fundraising, mobilizing community support and exercising exemplary fiduciary and stewardship practices.

== Notable alumni (Bishops and Cardinals) ==
St.Peter's Seminary has graduated a number of notable alumni who have been elevated to the rank or bishop; they include:

- Thomas Christopher Cardinal Collins, Archbishop of Toronto
- Robert Anthony Daniels, Bishop of Grand Falls, Newfoundland
- Brian Joseph Dunn, Archbishop of Halifax-Yarmouth, Nova Scotia
- Frederick Bernard Henry, Bishop Emeritus of Calgary
- Gary Gordon, Bishop of Victoria, British Columbia
- Eugène Philippe LaRocque
- William Terrence McGrattan, Bishop of Calgary
- Philip Francis Pocock
- Donald Thériault, Bishop Emeritus of the Roman Catholic Military Ordinariate of Canada
- Stephen Jensen, Bishop of Prince George, British Columbia

== See also ==
- Diocese of London, Ontario
- St. Peter's Cathedral Basilica (London)
- List of Roman Catholic Seminaries
- Higher education in Ontario
