= Bishop of Calgary =

Bishop of Calgary may refer to:

- the Bishop of the Anglican Diocese of Calgary
- the Bishop of the Roman Catholic Diocese of Calgary
