= John Anthony Boissonneau =

Canadian Catholic bishop

His Excellency, The Most Reverend John Boissonneau
- Auxiliary Bishop of Toronto; Titular Bishop of Tambeae
- Archdiocese: Archdiocese of Toronto

Orders
- Ordination: December 14, 1974
- Consecration: May 29, 2001 by Aloysius Matthew Ambrozic

Personal details
- Born: John Anthony Boissonneau; December 7, 1949 (age 76) Scarborough, Ontario, Canada
- Denomination: Roman Catholic
- Motto: 'Ut sit in Domino fiducia tua'; (So that your trust may be in the Lord)
- Coat of arms

Coat of arms of John Anthony Boissonneau.

John Anthony Boissonneau (born December 7, 1949, in Scarborough) is a Roman Catholic Auxiliary Bishop in Toronto, Canada.

He was ordained a priest on December 14, 1974.

Pope John Paul II appointed him Titular Bishop of Tambeae and Auxiliary Bishop of Toronto on March 23, 2001. The Archbishop of Toronto, Cardinal Aloysius Ambrozic, gave him the episcopal ordination on May 29 of the same year; co-consecrators were the auxiliary bishops in Toronto Nicola De Angelis CFIC, and Anthony Giroux Meagher.
