= Archdiocese of Toronto =

Roman Catholic Archdiocese in Canada

Metropolitan Archdiocese of Toronto Archidioecesis Metropolitana Torontina

- Coat of arms of the archdiocese

Location
- Country: Canada
- Territory: Southern Ontario, Georgian Bay
- Ecclesiastical province: Toronto
- Coordinates: 43°40′56″N 79°23′29″W

Statistics
- Area: 13,000 km^{2} (5,000 sq mi)
- Population: Total; Catholics: (as of 2020); 6,530,000; 2,061,600 (31.6%)
- Parishes: 226
- Churches: 2 missions
- Schools: 620

Information
- Denomination: Catholic
- Sui iuris church: Latin Church
- Rite: Roman Rite
- Established: December 17, 1841; 184 years ago
- Cathedral: St. Michael's Cathedral Basilica
- Patron saint: St. Michael the Archangel
- Secular priests: 781

Current leadership
- Pope: Leo XIV
- Archbishop: Frank Leo
- Auxiliary Bishops: John Anthony Boissonneau; Vincent Nguyen; Robert Kasun; Ivan Camilleri
- Bishops emeritus: Thomas Christopher Collins

Map

Website
- www.archtoronto.org

The Metropolitan Archdiocese of Toronto (Latin: Archidioecesis Metropolitana Torontina) is a Latin Church archdiocese of the Catholic Church in Canada that includes part of the province of Ontario. Its archbishop is also the ecclesiastical provincial for the dioceses of Hamilton, London, Saint Catharines, and Thunder Bay. The current Archbishop of Toronto is Frank Leo, who was appointed in February 2023.

Mass is celebrated daily within the Archdiocese of Toronto, with Sunday Mass (including vigils) in 36 ethnic and linguistic communities every week, making it one of the most ethnically diverse Catholic dioceses in the world. Overall, the Archdiocese of Toronto is the largest in Canada.

== History ==
The diocese was created on December 17, 1841, out of the Roman Catholic Archdiocese of Kingston, and it covered the western half of Upper Canada. At that time, Michael Power was appointed as the first bishop. For a complete history, see the Archdiocese History website.

During the 1840s, the major challenge was the huge, unexpected influx of very poor immigrants, mostly Irish, escaping the Great Famine. The fear was that Protestants might use their material needs as a wedge for evangelization. In response, the Church built a network of charitable institutions such as hospitals, schools, boarding homes, and orphanages to meet the needs and keep people inside the faith. The Church was less successful in dealing with tensions between the French and Irish Catholic clergy; eventually, the Irish took control.

Irish Catholics arriving in Toronto faced widespread intolerance and severe discrimination, both social and legislative, leading to several large-scale riots between Catholics and Protestants from 1858 to 1878, culminating in the Jubilee Riots of 1875. The Irish population essentially defined the Catholic population in Toronto until 1890, when German and French Catholics were welcomed to the city by the Irish, but the Irish proportion remained 90% of the Catholic population. However, various powerful initiatives such as the foundation of St. Michael's College in 1852 (where Marshall McLuhan was to hold the chair of English until he died in 1980), three hospitals, and the most significant charitable organizations in the city (the Society of St. Vincent de Paul) and House of Providence created by Irish Catholic groups strengthened the Irish identity, transforming the Irish presence in the city into one of influence and power.

McGowan argues that between 1890 and 1920, the city's Catholics experienced major social, ideological, and economic changes that allowed them to integrate into Toronto society and shake off their second-class status. The Irish Catholics (in contrast to the French) strongly supported Canada's role in the First World War. They broke out of the ghetto and lived in all of Toronto's neighbourhoods. Starting as unskilled labourers, they used high levels of education to move up and were well represented among the lower middle class. Most dramatically, they intermarried with Protestants at an unprecedented rate.

It was raised from a diocese to an archdiocese in 1898, which created the ecclesiastical province of Toronto, which included the suffragan dioceses of Hamilton, London, Saint Catharines, and Thunder Bay.

As of 2015, the archdiocese has 221 parishes and 24 missions. 393 active diocesan priests and 405 religious priests serve 2,066,440 Catholics. There are also 43 brothers, 560 sisters and 136 permanent deacons.

The archdiocese's motto, Quis ut Deus?, means "Who is like God?" — the literal meaning of the name "Michael," the saint to whom the diocese's cathedral is dedicated.

On March 19, 2019, the Ontario Court of Appeal allowed a former altar boy to proceed with suing the Archdiocese of Toronto on grounds related to sex abuse.

== Geography ==
The Archdiocese of Toronto covers a geographic region of the Great Lakes area, which stretches from the shores of Lake Ontario north to Georgian Bay. The area is some 13,000 square kilometres, containing intensely urban and suburban regions and also small cities, towns and rural areas.

The Archdiocese of Toronto includes the City of Toronto, the most populous metropolis in the country and the growing regional municipalities of Peel, York and Durham that surround the city. As the regional municipalities expand, the northern section of the Archdiocese, Simcoe County, is also experiencing notable suburban growth.

The archdiocese is divided into four pastoral regions, each overseen by an auxiliary bishop, comprising 14 pastoral zones. The four pastoral regions which divide the Archdiocese are the Central, Northern, Eastern and Western Regions. The zones are made up of parishes within a geographical boundary.

== Diocesan and other Bishops ==
=== Current bishops ===
Metropolitan Archbishop

- Cardinal Frank Leo (since 2023, previously Auxiliary Bishop of Montréal 2021-23)

Auxiliary bishops

- Bishop John Boissonneau (since 2001, responsible for the Northern Pastoral Region)
- Bishop Vincent Nguyen (since 2009, responsible for the Eastern Pastoral Region)
- Bishop Robert Kasun (since 2016, responsible for the Central Pastoral Region)
- Bishop Ivan Camilleri (since 2020, responsible for the Western Pastoral Region)

Emeritus

- Cardinal Thomas Christopher Collins (archbishop 2007–2023)

=== Former bishops ===
Former diocesan bishops (1841-70) and metropolitan archbishops (since 1870)

Former Coadjutor Bishops

- John Joseph Lynch, C.M. (1859-60, succeeded see in 1860, continued as archbishop upon see being elevated archdiocese in 1870, served until death in 1888)
- Philip Francis Pocock (1961-71 as coadjutor archbishop, succeeded see and served as archbishop 1971-78)
- Aloysius Matthew Ambrozic (1986-1990 as coadjutor archbishop, previously auxiliary bishop 1976-86, succeeded see and served as archbishop 1990-2006, created cardinal 1998)

Former Auxiliary Bishops

- Timothy O'Mahony (1879–92)
- Benjamin Webster (1946-54), appointed Bishop of Peterborough (suffragan of Kingston)
- Francis Allen (1954-77)
- Francis Marrocco (1955-68), appointed Bishop of Peterborough
- Thomas Fulton (1968-78), appointed Bishop of Saint Catharines (suffragan of Toronto)
- Aloysius Matthew Ambrozic (1976-86, appointed coadjutor, see above)
- Leonard Wall (1979-92)
- Michael Pearse Lacey (1979-93)
- Robert Clune (1979-95)
- John Knight (1992-2002)
- Nicola De Angelis, C.F.I.C. (1992-2002), appointed Bishop of Peterborough
- Terrence Prendergast, S.J. (1995-1998), appointed Archbishop of Halifax
- R. Anthony Meagher (1997-2002), appointed Archbishop of Kingston
- Richard Grecco (2002-2009), appointed Bishop of Charlottetown, Prince Edward Island (suffragan of Halifax–Yarmouth)
- Daniel Bohan (2003-2005), appointed Archbishop of Regina
- Peter Joseph Hundt (2006-2011), appointed Bishop of Corner Brook and Labrador (suffragan of St. John's, Newfoundland)
- William McGrattan (2009-2014), appointed Bishop of Peterborough, Ontario
- Wayne Kirkpatrick (2012-19), appointed Bishop of Antigonish (suffragan of Halifax–Yarmouth)

Other priests of this diocese who became Bishops

- Francis Carroll, appointed Bishop of Calgary (suffragan of Edmonton) in 1935
- John Aloysius O′Mara, appointed Bishop of Thunder Bay (suffragan of Toronto) in 1976

== Churches ==
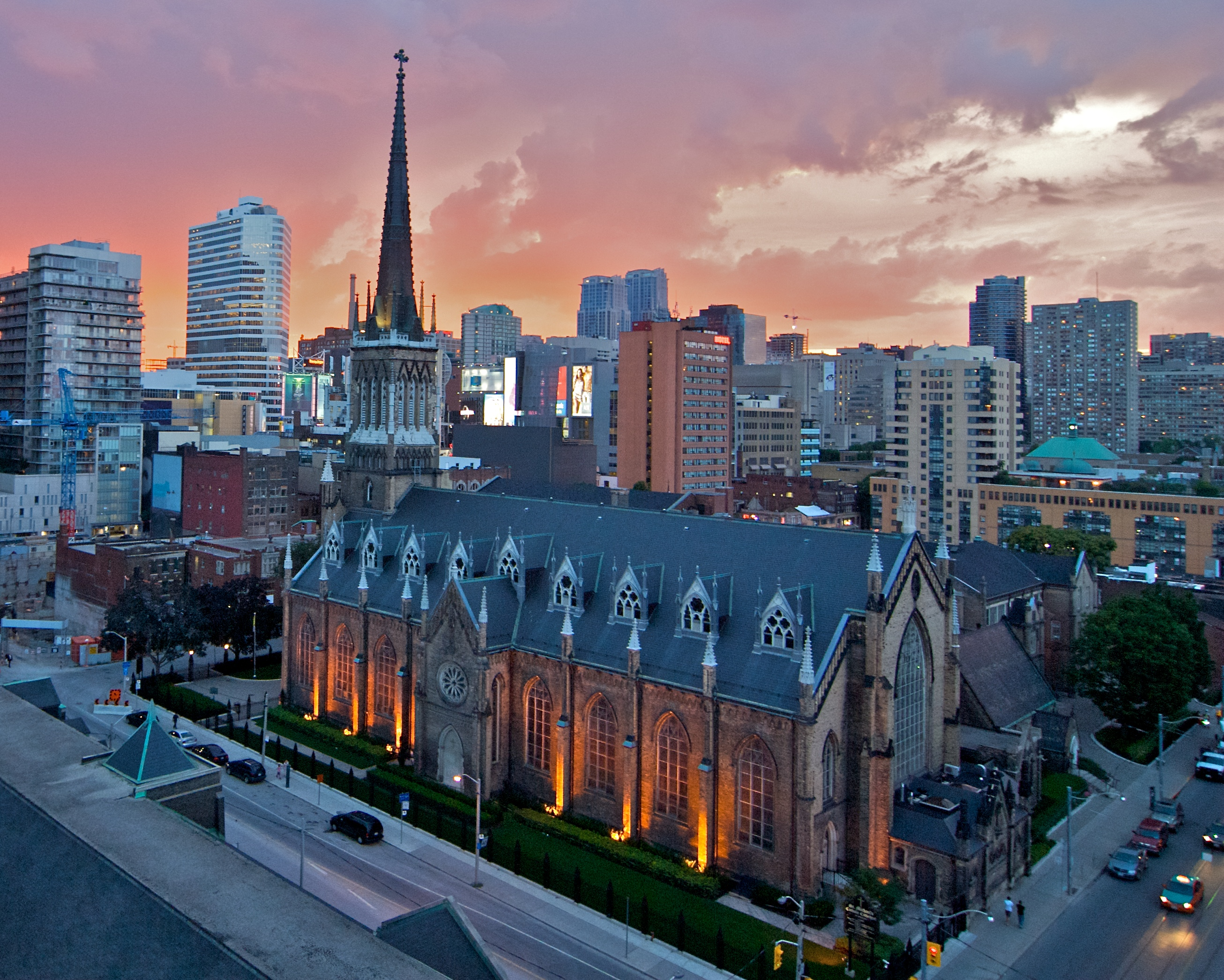
St. Michael's Cathedral at Sunset. The Cathedral church of the Archdiocese of Toronto was dedicated on September 29, 1845.

Toronto

- Chinese Martyrs Catholic Church
- Our Lady of Lourdes, Toronto
- Saint Fidelis Catholic Church
- St. Michael's Cathedral, Toronto
- St. Agnes, Toronto
- St. Basil's Church, Toronto
- St. Clare's Church, Toronto
- St. Francis of Assisi, Toronto
- St. Helen's, Brockton
- St. Mary's Church (Toronto)
- St. Paul's Basilica
- St. Patrick's Church, Toronto
- St. Peter's Church, Toronto
- Holy Martyrs of Japan, Bradford
- Holy Family, Bolton
- Holy Family, Parkdale
- Holy Rosary Church, Forest Hill
- St. Elizabeth Seton (Newmarket)
- St. Vincent de Paul, Roncesvalles
- St. Pius X, Bloor West
- St. Leo's, Mimico
- St. Mark, Humber Bay
- St. Teresa, New Toronto
- Christ the King, Long Branch
- St. Ambrose, Alderwood
- Holy Angels, Queensway
- Our Lady of Sorrows, Kingsway
- Our Lady of Peace, Six Points
- St. Clement, Markland Wood
- Markham, Ontario

== Education ==
- Conseil scolaire catholique MonAvenir
- Dufferin-Peel Catholic District School Board
- Durham Catholic District School Board
- Simcoe Muskoka Catholic District School Board
- Toronto Catholic District School Board
- York Catholic District School Board

== Cemeteries ==
- Assumption Catholic Cemetery, Mississauga
- Christ the King Catholic Cemetery, Markham
- Guardian Angels Catholic Cemetery, Brampton - Proposed
- Holy Cross Catholic Cemetery, Markham
- Holy Rosary Catholic Cemetery, Markham - Proposed
- Mount Hope Catholic Cemetery, Toronto
- Queen of Heaven Catholic Cemetery, Vaughan
- Resurrection Catholic Cemetery, Whitby
- St. Mary's Catholic Cemetery, Barrie
- Unnamed Catholic Cemetery, Bradford - Proposed

== See also ==
- Shrine of the Canadian Martyrs
- Manresa Jesuit Spiritual Renewal Centre
