= Diocese of Calgary =

Diocese of Calgary may refer to the following ecclesiastical jurisdictions with seat in Calgary, Alberta, Canada:

- Roman Catholic Diocese of Calgary
- Anglican Diocese of Calgary
