= Maxwell Bates =

Canadian architect and artist (1906-1980)

- Born: Maxwell Bennett Bates; 14 December 1906; Calgary, Alberta, Canada
- Died: 4 September 1980 (aged 73); Victoria, British Columbia
- Education: Provincial Institute of Technology and Art in Calgary
- Spouses: May Watson (m. 1949; died 1952) Charlotte Kintzle (m. 1954)
- Awards: CM
- Occupation: Architect
- Buildings: St. Mary's Cathedral

Maxwell Bates CM RCA LL.D (14 December 1906 – 14 September 1980) was an architect and expressionist painter.

== Biography ==
Born in Calgary, Alberta in 1906, Bates started painting at an early age; his piece In the Kitchen was painted when he was 15 years old. As a young adult, he worked for his father's architecture firm. His father, William Stanley Bates, was himself a prominent architect in early Calgary who designed the Burns Building (1912) and the Grain Exchange (1909).

Bates studied with Lars Jonson Haukaness at the Provincial Institute of Technology and Art in Calgary from 1926–1927. In 1931 Bates moved to England, where he supported himself as a door-to-door vacuum salesman while exhibiting his art work at the Wertheim Gallery. In England he associated with promising young artists such as Barbara Hepworth and Victor Pasmore.

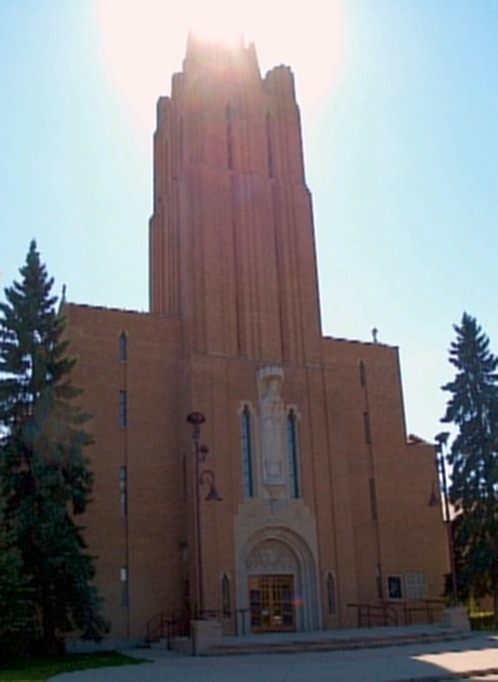
St Mary's Cathedral in Calgary was designed by Maxwell Bates.

As a member of the British Territorial Army in 1940, Bates was captured in France and became a prisoner of war in Thuringia. He remained a POW until 1945. This experience was captured in his 1978 book A Wilderness of Days.

Bates returned to Calgary in 1946 to work with his father's architectural firm again. His first wife May Watson, whom he married in 1949, died in 1952. He then married Charlotte Kintzle in 1954.

In 1949 Bates studied at the Brooklyn Museum; took Drawing and Painting with Max Beckmann and Analysis and Criticism with Abraham Rattner. As an architect, his most notable work was St. Mary's Cathedral, which was consecrated in 1957.

Bates suffered a stroke in 1961. In 1962 he moved from Calgary to Victoria, British Columbia. He suffered a second stroke in 1978 and died in Victoria in 1980.

His work has been showcased at art galleries worldwide and retrospective exhibitions have been shown in galleries such as the Mackenzie Art Gallery (1960), the Winnipeg Art Gallery (1968), the Vancouver Art Gallery (1974), and the Art Gallery of Greater Victoria (1982), curated by Ian M. Thom.

In 1971, he received an honorary doctorate from the University of Calgary. In 1980 he was made a Member of the Order of Canada.

== Memberships ==
Bates was a member of the Royal Architectural Institute of Canada (Member 1951 Life Member 1963); a full member of the Royal Canadian Academy of Arts (1947) and a member of the Canadian Society of Painters in Water Colour (C.S.P.W.C.) (1951); Canadian Society of Graphic Art (C.S.G.A.) (1947); the Alberta Society of Artists; the B.C. Society of Artists (1967); the Federation of Canadian Artists (F.C.A.) (1947); the Canadian Group of Painters (C.G.P.) (1957); and the Calgary Arts Club. In Victoria, B.C. he was a member and the first president of the Limners, a group formed in 1971 which he helped to found.

== Honours ==
- Royal Canadian Academy of Arts (1971);
- Honorary award from the Royal Architectural Institute of Canada (MRAIC);
- Honorary doctorate from the University of Calgary (1971);
- Order of Canada;

== Publications by artist ==
- "Far Away Flags" (1964) contains his collection of his poems;
- "A Wilderness of Days" (1978) details his experience of internment in a German prisoner-of-war camp 1940-45;
