= William McGrattan =

Canadian Catholic prelate (born 1956)

The Most Reverend William McGrattan
- Bishop of Calgary
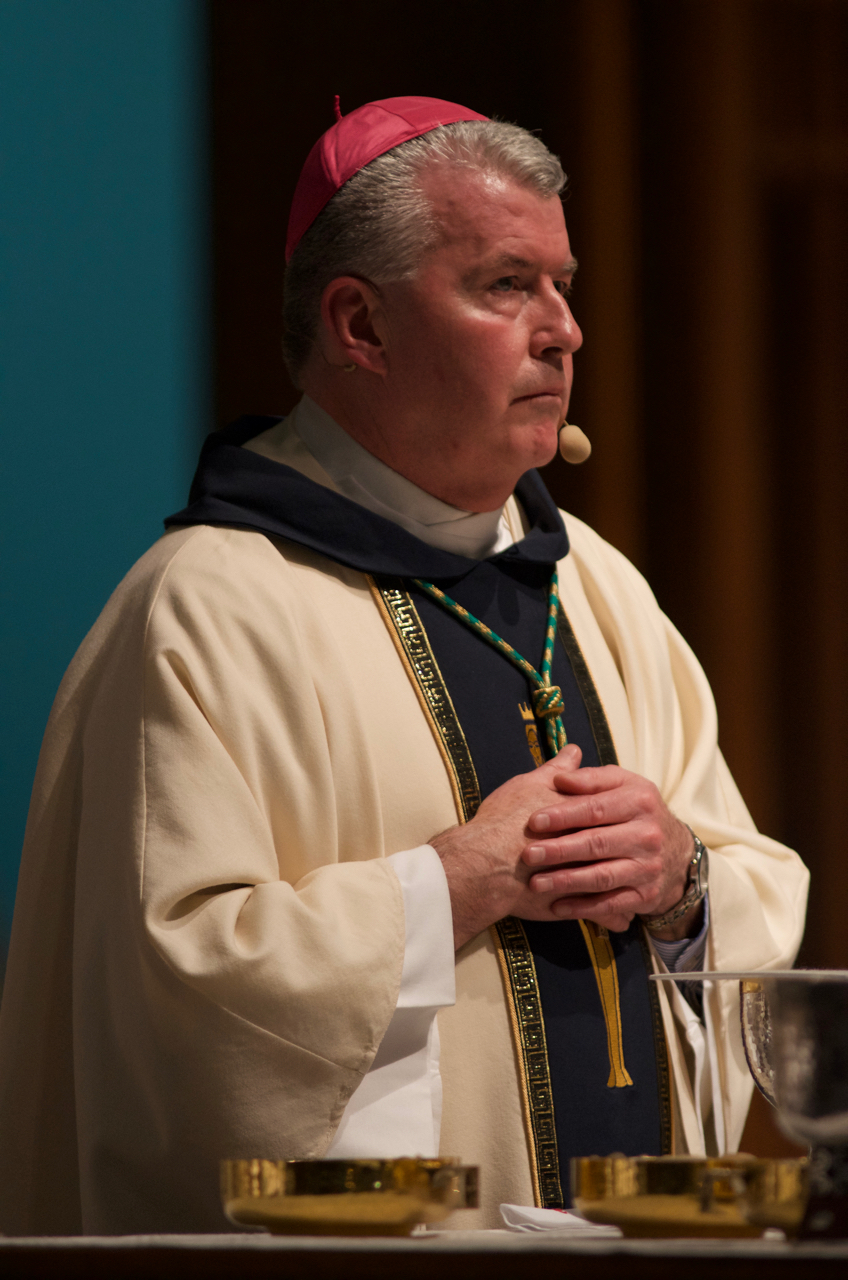
- McGrattan in 2017
- Church: Catholic
- Diocese: Calgary
- Appointed: 4 January 2017
- Installed: 27 February 2017
- Predecessor: Frederick Henry
- Previous posts: Bishop of Peterborough (2014–2017); Auxiliary Bishop of Toronto & Titular Bishop of Furnos Minor (2010–2014); Rector, St. Peter's Seminary (1997–2010)

Orders
- Ordination: 2 May 1987 by John Michael Sherlock
- Consecration: 12 January 2010 by Ronald Peter Fabbro

Personal details
- Born: William Terrence McGrattan; 19 September 1956 (age 70) London, Ontario, Canada
- Denomination: Catholic
- Education: Pontificia Università Gregoriana (STL); St. Peter's Seminary (M.Div); University of Western Ontario (BESc)
- Motto: Habe fiduciam in Domino (Latin for 'Trust in the Lord')
- Styles
- Reference style: His Excellency
- Spoken style: Your Excellency
- Religious style: Monsignor

William Terrence McGrattan (born 19 September 1956) is the eighth and current bishop of the Diocese of Calgary. He previously served as an auxiliary bishop of the Archdiocese of Toronto from 2010 to 2014 and then served as Bishop of Peterborough from 2014 to 2017.

== Biography ==
McGrattan was born in London, Ontario. He received a Bachelor of Engineering Science in chemical engineering from the University of Western Ontario, London, in 1979. In 1987, he obtained a Master of Divinity from St. Peter's Seminary. McGrattan was ordained to the priesthood on 2 May 1987 for the Diocese of London by Bishop John Michael Sherlock.

After ordination, Father McGrattan served three years as associate pastor at St. Joseph's Parish in Chatham. He then continued in theology in Rome, where in 1992 he earned a Licentiate in Fundamental Moral Theology from the Pontifical Gregorian University. He became a member of the faculty at St. Peter's Seminary in London, Ontario, where he served as dean of theology, becoming rector in 1997.

== Bishop ==
On 6 November 2009, McGrattan was appointed by Pope Benedict XVI as one of two new auxiliary bishops for the Archdiocese of Toronto along with Vincent Nguyen. McGrattan was ordained Titular Bishop of Furnos Minor on 12 January 2010 at St. Peter's Cathedral Basilica in London by Bishop Ronald Peter Fabbro. Bishop McGrattan took as his motto "Habe fiduciam in Domino" (Trust in the Lord) from Proverbs 3:5.

As Auxiliary Bishop of Toronto, McGrattan had responsibility for the central region, which includes seventy-one parishes in the central part of the city of Toronto. In addition to his regional responsibilities, he was vicar for lay movements and associations, vicar for ethnic communities, and the liaison bishop for the Catholic school chaplains of Ontario, the Catholic Association of Religious and Family Life Educators of Ontario, the Catholic Health Association of Ontario, and the Catholic Health Alliance of Canada.

On 8 April 2014, McGrattan was appointed 12th bishop of the Diocese of Peterborough, Ontario, and installed on 23 June 2014. He was appointed Bishop of Calgary, Alberta, Canada, on 4 January 2017, but continued to serve as apostolic administrator until his successor was installed. He was installed as Bishop of Calgary on 27 February 2017.

McGrattan is a member of the Canadian Conference of Catholic Bishops' Doctrine Commission and Bishop Liaison for Catholic Health Alliance of Canada. He was elected president of the Canadian Conference of Catholic Bishops for a two-year term, from 2023–2025.

== Religious timeline ==
- 6 November 2009: Appointed Auxiliary Bishop for the Archdiocese of Toronto
- 6 November 2009: Appointed Titular Bishop of Furnos Minor
- 12 January 2010: Ordained Titular Bishop of Furnos Minor
- 8 April 2014: Appointed Bishop of Peterborough, Ontario, Canada
- 4 January 2017: Appointed Bishop of Calgary, Alberta, Canada

== Professional experience ==
- 1997–2009: Associate Professor, St. Peter's Seminary, London
  - Fundamental Moral Theology, Sacramental Theology, Religious Studies
- 1994–1997: Assistant Professor, St. Peter's Seminary, London
  - Fundamental Moral Theology, Sacramental Theology, Religious Studies
- 1992–1994: Lecturer, St. Peter's Seminary, London
- 1982–1987: Research Assistant, The University of Western Ontario, London
- 1979–1982: Chemical Engineer (P.Eng.), Polysar Limited, Sarnia

Catholic Church titles
| Preceded by Henryk Tomasik | Titular Bishop of Furnos Minor; 2010–2014 | Succeeded by Ernesto Maguengue |
| Preceded by | Auxiliary Bishop of Toronto; 2010–2014 | Succeeded by |
| Preceded by Nicola De Angelis | Bishop of Peterborough; 2014–2017 | Succeeded by Daniel Miehm |
| Preceded by Frederick Henry | Bishop of Calgary; 2017–present | Incumbent |
