= Frank Leo =

Canadian Catholic cardinal (born 1971)

His Eminence Frank Leo TOSD
- Cardinal, Archbishop of Toronto
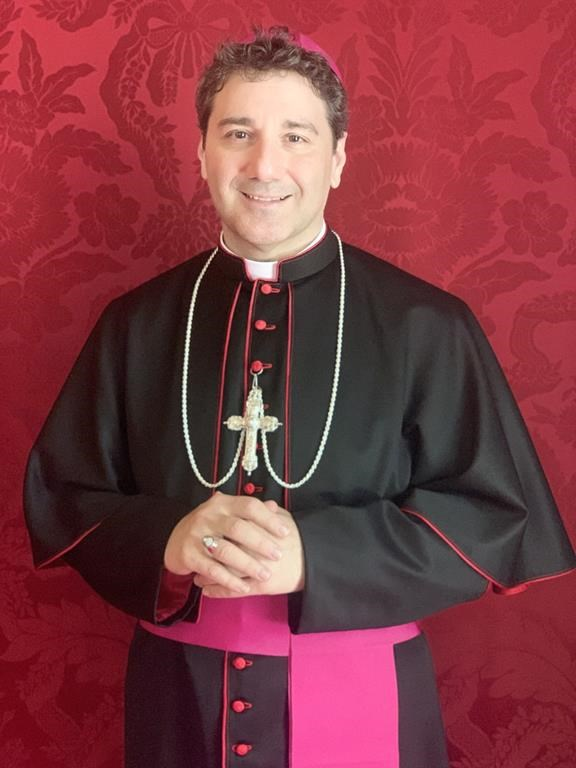
- Leo in 2023
- Church: Catholic
- Archdiocese: Toronto
- Appointed: February 11, 2023
- Installed: March 25, 2023
- Predecessor: Thomas Christopher Collins
- Other post: Cardinal-Priest of Santa Maria della Salute a Primavalle
- Previous posts: Auxiliary Bishop of Montreal & Titular Bishop of Tamada (2022–2023)

Orders
- Ordination: December 14, 1996
- Consecration: September 12, 2022 by Christian Lépine
- Created cardinal: December 7, 2024 by Pope Francis
- Rank: Cardinal-Priest

Personal details
- Born: Francis Leo; June 30, 1971 (age 55) Montreal, Quebec, Canada
- Education: Institut de Formation Théologique de Montréal; International Marian Research Institute
- Motto: Quodcumque dixerit facite (Latin for 'Do whatever He says')
- Styles
- Reference style: His Eminence
- Spoken style: Your Eminence
- Religious style: His Eminence
- Informal style: Cardinal
- See: Toronto

Francis Leo (born June 30, 1971) is a Canadian Catholic prelate serving as Archbishop of Toronto since 2023. He previously served as auxiliary bishop of the Archdiocese of Montreal from 2022 to 2023. Since 2007, he has been a member of the Priestly Fraternities of Saint Dominic.

He was made a cardinal on December 7, 2024, by Pope Francis. Leo is the Grand Prior of the Canada-Toronto Lieutenancy of the Equestrian Order of the Holy Sepulchre of Jerusalem.

== Biography ==
Leo was born in Montreal on June 30, 1971, to Italian immigrant parents, Francesco Leo and Rosa Valente. He earned a bachelor's degree at the Institut de Formation Théologique de Montréal (IFTM) and both a licentiate and a doctorate in theology at the International Marian Research Institute. He was ordained a priest of the Archdiocese of Montreal in 1996. He studied at the Pontifical Ecclesiastical Academy in Rome from 2006 to 2008 and then joined the diplomatic service of the Holy See. He was posted to the apostolic nunciature in Australia from 2008 to 2011 and then to the Holy See Study Mission in Hong Kong from 2011 to 2012.

On November 18, 2007, he became a member of the Third Order of Saint Dominic. He took his vows on May 11, 2008.

In 2012, he returned to Montreal to take up appointments as director and dogmatics teacher at the Major Seminary, director of the IFTM's Department of Canon Law, and vice president of the archdiocesan vocations service. From 2013 to 2015, he was a member of the priests' council. He founded the Canadian Mariological Society and became its president. From 2015 to 2021 he was secretary general of the Canadian Conference of Catholic Bishops.

In February 2022, he became vicar general and moderator of the curia for the Archdiocese of Montreal.

On July 16, 2022, Pope Francis appointed him titular bishop of Tamada and auxiliary bishop of Montreal. He received his episcopal consecration on September 12, 2022.

On February 11, 2023, Pope Francis appointed Leo as Archbishop of Toronto. He was installed there on 25 March in St. Michael's Cathedral Basilica.

On October 6, 2024, Pope Francis announced that he would make Leo a cardinal on December 8, 2024. That date was later moved to December 7, 2024, and he was then elevated as cardinal priest of Santa Maria della Salute a Primavalle.

He participated as a cardinal elector in the 2025 papal conclave that elected Pope Leo XIV.

In 2025, Leo was named one of Toronto Life's 50 most influential people.

In 2026, Leo implemented Traditionis custodes at four churches in the Archdiocese of Toronto. Leo has not yet released a public decree regarding this implementation.

== See also ==
- Catholic Church in Canada
- Cardinals created by Pope Francis

Religious titles
Preceded by Thomas Christopher Collins	Archbishop of Toronto; 11 February 2023 – present	Incumbent
