= James Leonard Doyle =

Canadian Catholic bishop (1929–2004)

- Bishop of Peterborough
- Church: Catholic Church
- Diocese: Peterborough
- Appointed: May 24, 1976
- Installed: July 14, 1976
- Term ended: December 28, 2002
- Predecessor: Francis Anthony Marrocco
- Successor: Nicola De Angelis

Orders
- Ordination: June 12, 1954
- Consecration: June 28, 1976 by Gerald Emmett Carter

Personal details
- Born: June 20, 1929 Chatham, Ontario, Canada
- Died: April 22, 2004 (aged 74)

James Leonard Doyle (June 20, 1929 – April 22, 2004) was a Canadian Roman Catholic prelate. He was the bishop of the Diocese of Peterborough, Ontario from 1976 to 2002.
