= Tambeae =

Roman civitas

Africa Proconsularis (125 AD)

Tambeae was a Roman civitas located in the province of Byzacena in Africa Proconsulare. It existed from the Roman era into late antiquity.

== Bishopric ==
Tambeae must have been of some importance as it was the seat of an ancient Christian diocese which remains today as a titular see of the Roman Catholic Church.

There are five documented bishops of this African diocese.

- Secondiano took part in the council held in Carthage in 256 by St. Cyprian to discuss the question concerning the lapsii.
- Gemellio took part in the council of Cabarsussi, held in 393 by the Maximianists, a dissident sect of the Donatists, and signed the deeds.
- At the Carthage conference of 411, which saw the Catholic and Donatist bishops of Roman Africa gathered together, the town was represented by the Catholic bishop Sopater and the Donatist Faustino.
- Servus Dei intervened at the synod gathered in Carthage by Huneric the Vandal king in 484, after which he was exiled.

Today Tambeae survives as a titular bishop's seat; the current titular bishop is John Anthony Boissonneau, auxiliary bishop of Toronto.

- Pedro Aguilera Narbona (1966 - 1968)
- Francisco Raval Cruces (1968 - 1970)
- Saint Oscar Arnulfo Romero y Galdamez (1970 - 1974)
- Angélico Sândalo Bernardino (1974 - 2000)
- John Anthony Boissonneau, 2001
