= Michael Pearse Lacey =

Canadian bishop (1916–2014)

- Auxiliary Bishop of Archdiocese of Toronto (emeritus)
- Church: Roman Catholic Church
- See: Archdiocese of Toronto
- In office: 1979–1993
- Previous post(s): Priest

Orders
- Ordination: May 23, 1943 by Archbishop James C. McGuigan

Personal details
- Born: November 26, 1916; Toronto, Ontario, Canada
- Died: April 2, 2014 (aged 97); Toronto, Ontario, Canada

Michael Pearse Lacey (November 26, 1916 – April 2, 2014) was a Canadian bishop of the Roman Catholic Church. At the time of his death he was one of the oldest bishops in the Catholic Church and the oldest Canadian bishop.

Lacey was born in the Greater Toronto Area and attended St. Helen's Separate School and St. Michael's College before entering St. Augustine's Seminary in 1936, aged 19. He was ordained on May 23, 1943 in St. Michael's Cathedral by Archbishop James C. McGuigan.

From 1943 to 1957 Lacey assisted at St. Patrick's Parish (Port Colborne), St. Cecilia's Parish (Toronto), St. Monica's Parish (Toronto) and St. Pius X Parish (Toronto). He was appointed auxiliary bishop of the Archdiocese of Toronto on May 3, 1979, and was consecrated on June 21, 1979. He remained as auxiliary bishop of the Toronto Archdiocese until his retirement on May 31, 1993, and continued as Titular Bishop of Diano until his death on April 2, 2014.

A strong supporter of Catholic education, Monsignor Lacey served as a Trustee of the Metropolitan Separate School Board and was one of the lead organizers in the development of St. Stephen's Downtown Chapel, serving the business community, which opened in 1977.

== See also ==
- Diocese of Bom Jesus da Lapa
