= Gabrje, Dobrova–Polhov Gradec =

Gabrje
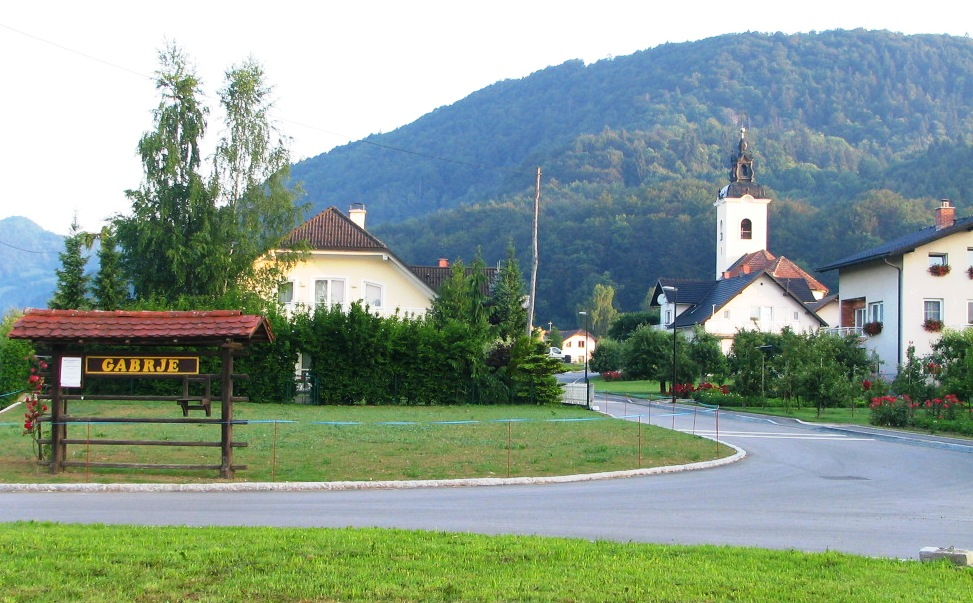

- Location in Slovenia
- Coordinates: 46°4′19.5″N 14°24′35.47″E
- Country: Slovenia
- Traditional region: Upper Carniola
- Statistical region: Central Slovenia
- Municipality: Dobrova–Polhov Gradec

Area
  - Total: 3.72 km^{2} (1.44 sq mi)
- Elevation: 336 m (1,102 ft)

Population (2020)
  - Total: 472
  - Density: 127/km^{2} (329/sq mi)

Gabrje (pronounced [ˈɡaːbəɾjɛ]; in older sources also Gabrije) is a settlement north of Dobrova in the Municipality of Dobrova–Polhov Gradec in the Upper Carniola region of Slovenia. It also comprises the hamlets of Jarčji Potok (Slovene: Jarčji potok), Knapovec, Pod Kotom, Ravnik, and Žerovnik. The settlement includes three creeks—from west to east, Žerovnik Creek (Žerovnikov graben), Jarc Creek (Jarči potok), and Ostrožnik Creek—all tributaries of the Gradaščica River.

== Name ==
The name Gabrje means 'hornbeam forest' and, like similar names (e.g., Gaberje, Gabrče, Veliki Gaber), originally referred to the local vegetation.

== History ==
On 9 May 1942 Italian forces burned two houses in the hamlet of Žerovnikov Graben, and on 12 July 1942 burned the hamlet of Jarčji Potok.

== Religious heritage ==
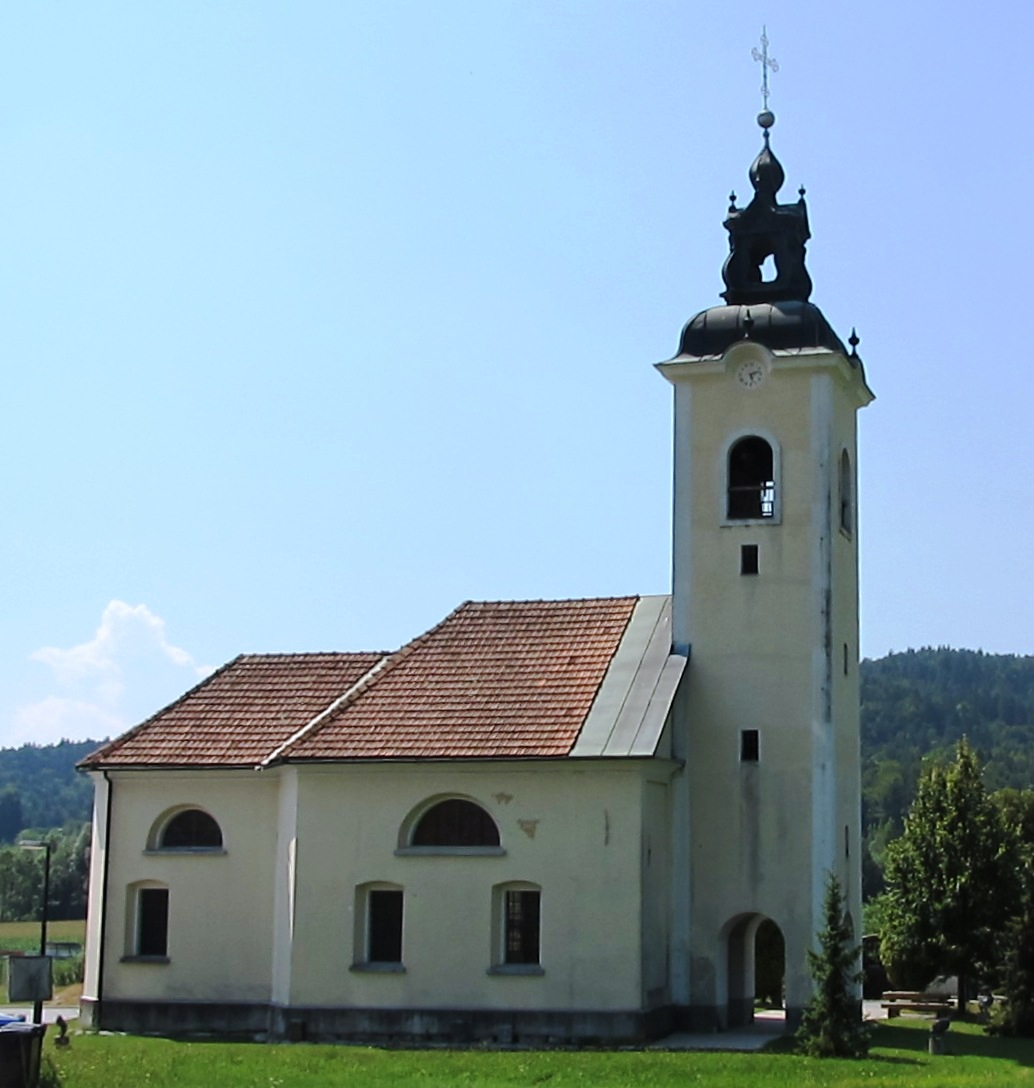
St. John the Baptist Church

The local church is a chapel of ease dedicated to John the Baptist. It stands in the center of the settlement. The church in Gabrje was originally subordinate to the proto-parish of Šentvid nad Ljubljano. The church in Gabrje was assigned to Dobrova when it became a vicariate in 1723, and when Dobrova was elevated to a parish in 1784 it became part of that parish.

The first church was mentioned at the site in 1544, but this was replaced by a late Baroque structure designed by Lovrenc Prager (1728–1791) and built from 1762 to 1772. It is a single-nave hall church with three arched segments, a square chancel, and a more recent bell tower. The main altar is from the second half of the 18th century, and the two side altars from the 19th century. On 12 March 1943, the Partisans burned down the church and dynamited the bell tower. The church is registered as cultural heritage.

A crucifix shrine with a large wooden figure of Christ stands in the center of the village. It dates from 1921 and is registered as cultural heritage.

== Other cultural heritage ==
In addition to its church and shrine, Gabrje has other registered cultural heritage items:

- The house at Gabrje no. 3 stands in the center of the village. This is a single-story rectangular house with a central entrance and an accentuated gable. The year 1908 is carved into the rectangular stone door casing. The structure preserves vertical window openings with window bars and the square windows of a storeroom.
- The village core of Gabrje preserves the village thoroughfares and a central area with a crucifix shrine and houses and barns built between the mid-19th and mid-20th century. It is distinguished by its settlement pattern, architecture, and ambiance.
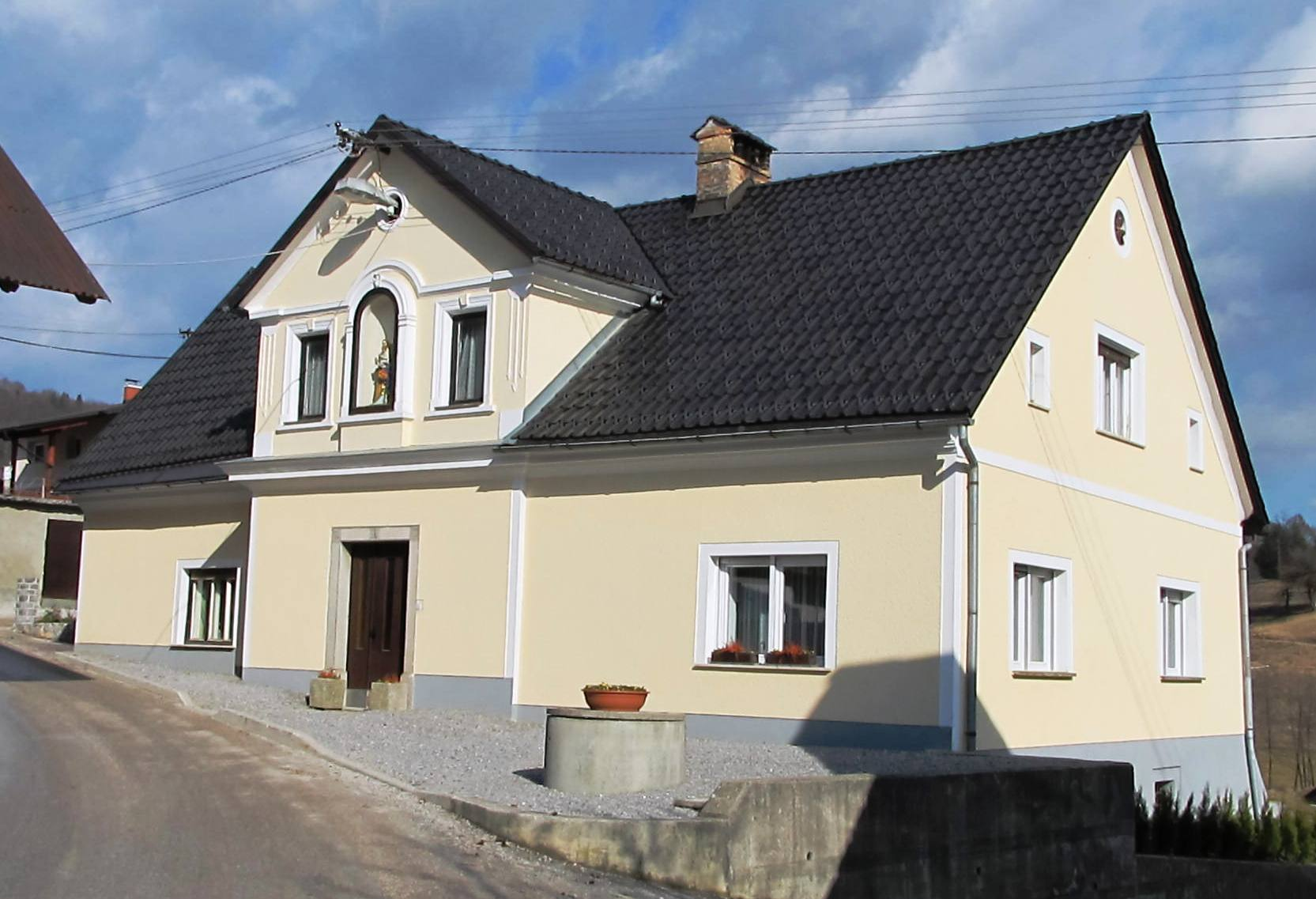
The house at Gabrje no. 3

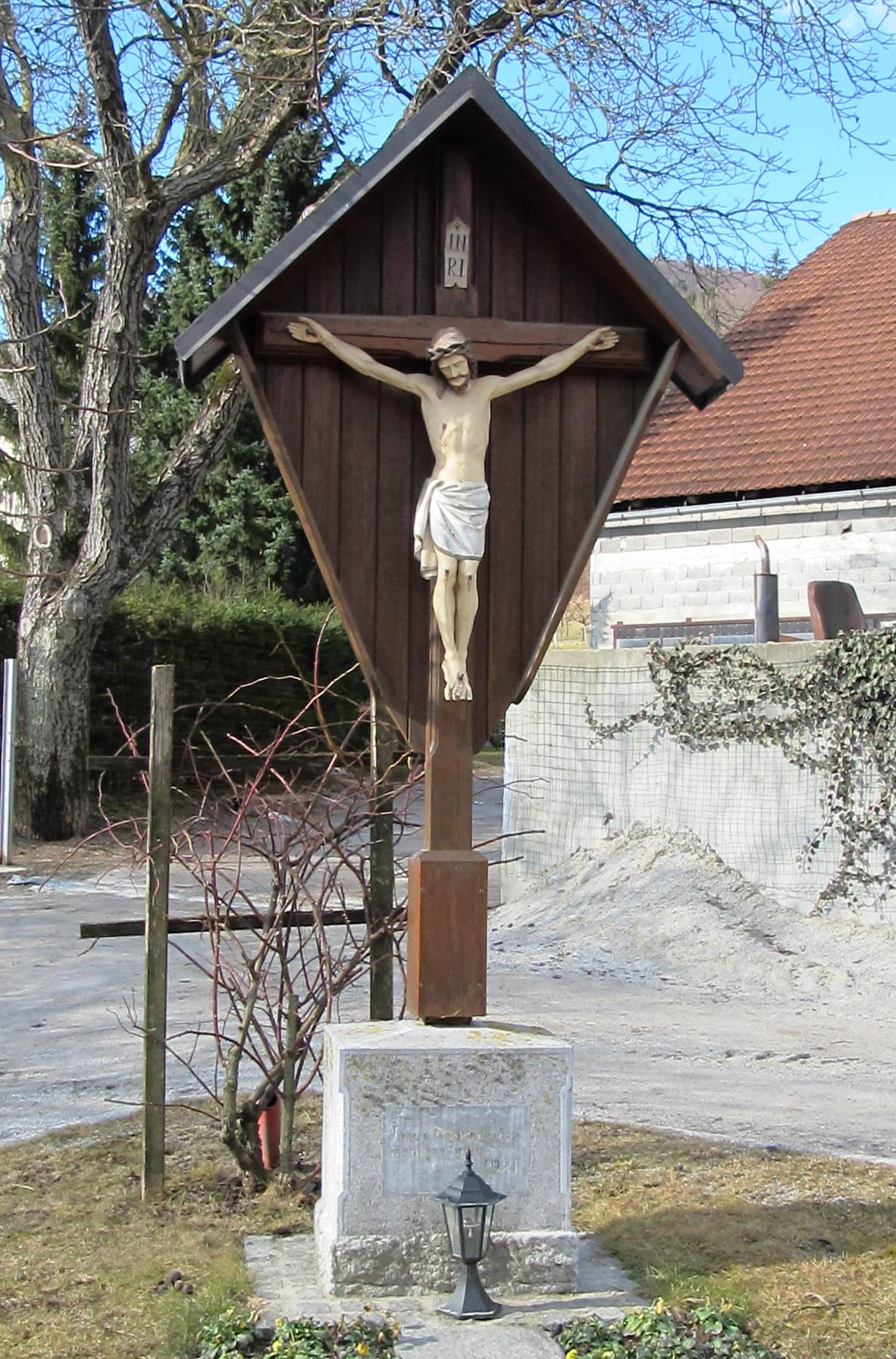
Crucifix shrine in the village core of Gabrje

== Notable people ==
Notable people that were born or lived in Gabrje include:

- Cardinal Aloysius Ambrozic (1930–2011), archbishop of Toronto
- Bernard Ambrožič (1892–1973), journalist and editor
- Jože Rihar (1914–2002), agronomist and beekeeping expert

== Gallery ==
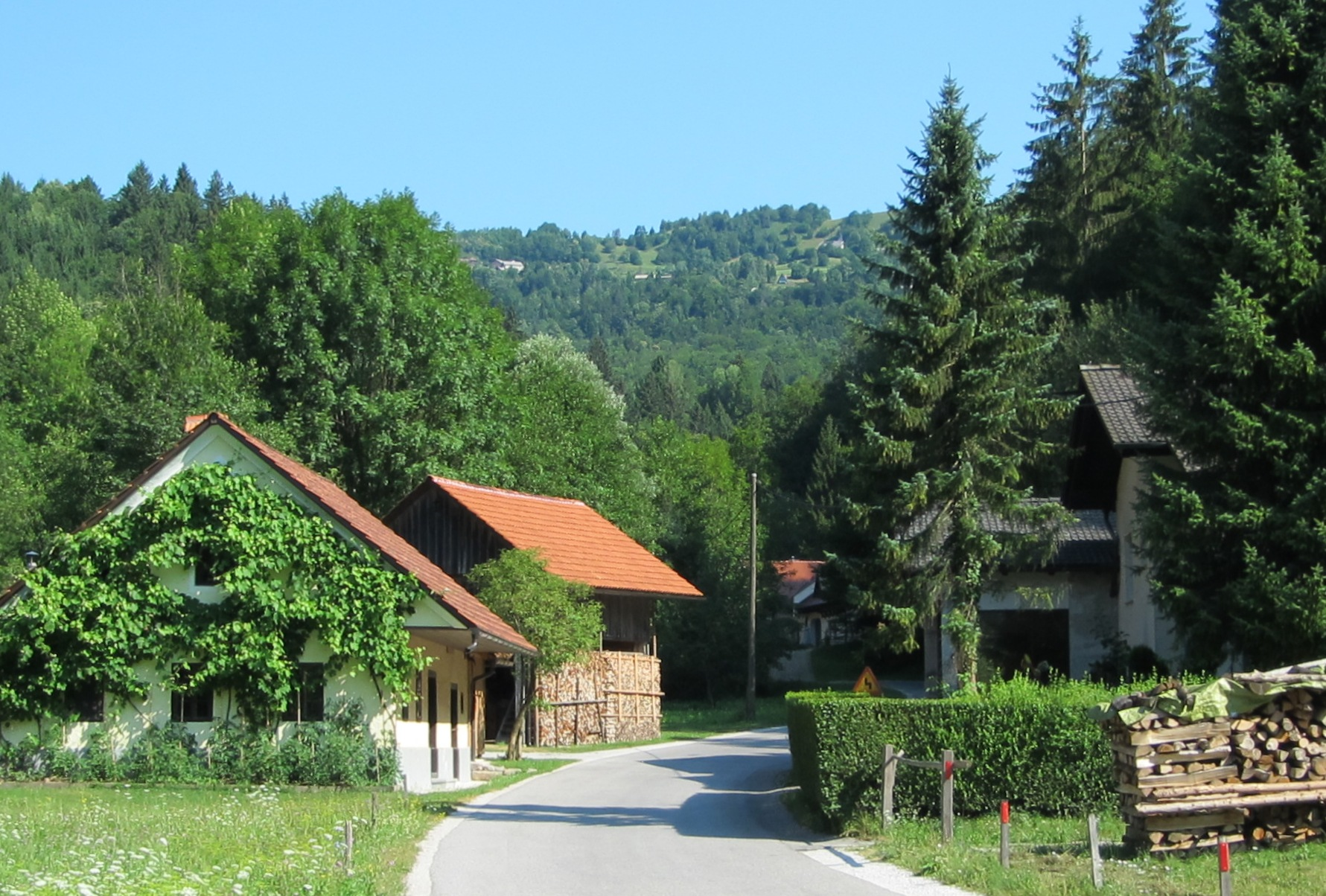
The hamlet of Žerovnik

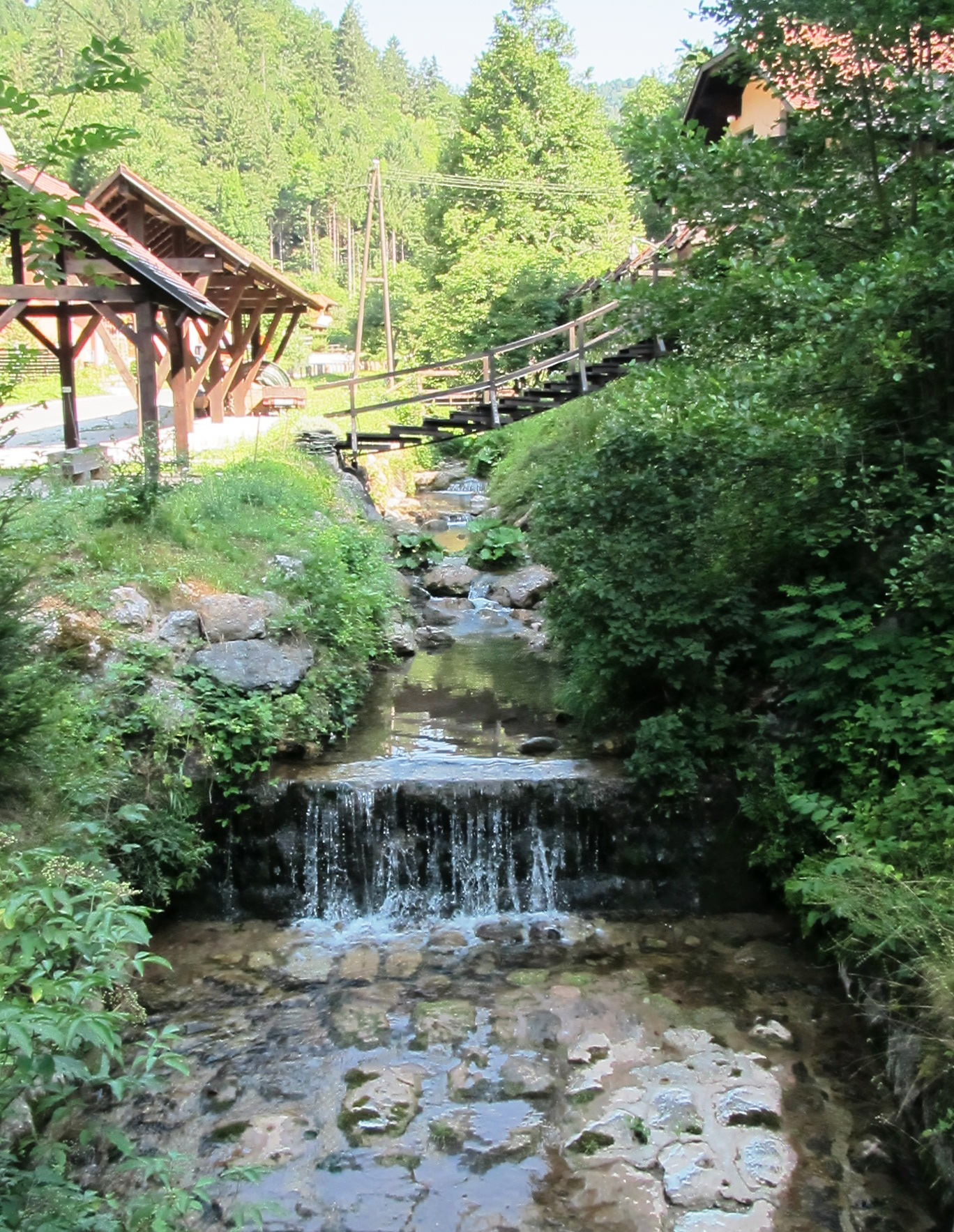
The lower course of Žerovnik Creek
