= Frederick Henry (bishop) =

Canadian Roman Catholic bishop (1943–2024)

The Most Reverend Frederick Henry
- Bishop of Calgary
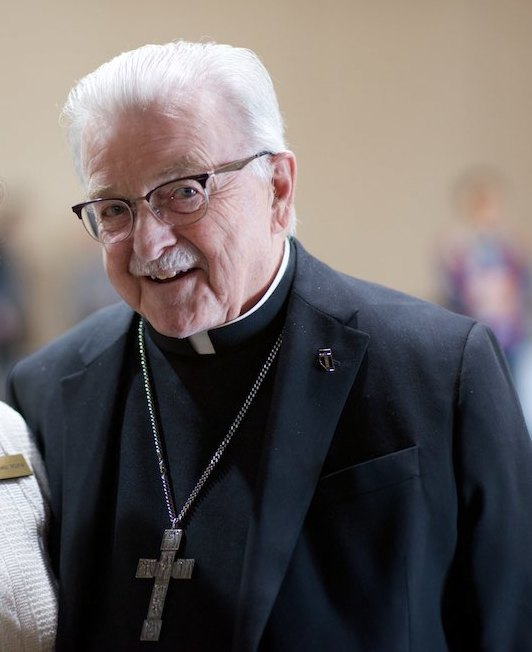
- Henry in 2017
- Archdiocese: Edmonton
- Diocese: Calgary
- Appointed: January 19, 1998
- Term ended: January 4, 2017
- Predecessor: Paul John O'Byrne
- Successor: William Terrence McGrattan
- Previous posts: Auxiliary Bishop of London, Ontario and Titular Bishop of Carinola (1986–1995); Bishop of Thunder Bay (1995–1998)

Orders
- Ordination: May 25, 1968 by Gerald Emmett Carter
- Consecration: June 24, 1986 by John Michael Sherlock, Marcel André Joseph Gervais and Anthony Frederick Tonnos

Personal details
- Born: Frederick Bernard Henry; November 17, 1943 London, Ontario, Canada
- Died: December 3, 2024 (aged 81) Calgary, Alberta, Canada

Frederick Bernard Henry (April 11, 1943 – December 3, 2024) was the seventh bishop of the diocese of Roman Catholic Diocese of Calgary, in the province of Alberta, Canada.

== Biography ==
Henry was ordained to the priesthood on May 25, 1968. He held an M.A. in Philosophy from the University of Notre Dame and a licentiate in theology from Gregorian University in Rome. From 1973 to 1986 he served as associate professor of Theology and Philosophy at St. Peter's Seminary. In 1986 he was appointed auxiliary bishop of London and titular bishop of Carinola, Italy. In 1995 he was installed as the fifth bishop of Thunder Bay, Ontario, and on March 19, 1998 he was installed as the seventh bishop of Calgary. He was granted early retirement as Bishop of Calgary by Pope Francis on January 4, 2017, due to health concerns. He served as the Apostolic Administrator of the diocese until the installation of his successor, William McGrattan, on February 27, 2017. He died in Calgary on December 3, 2024, at the age of 81.

== Pastoral assignments ==
- 1968–1970 Associate Pastor, Christ the King Parish, Windsor, ON.
- 1970–1973 Post Graduate Studies: University of Notre Dame, Notre Dame, Indiana - M.A. Philosophy.
- Gregorian University, Rome, Italy - Licentiate in Theology.
- 1973–1986 Associate Professor of Theology and Philosophy at St. Peter's Seminary.
- 1973–1981 Group Spiritual Director, St. Peter's Seminary.
- 1981–1986 Rector of St. Peter's Seminary.
- April 18, 1985 Named Honorary Prelate, with title, "Monsignor".
- April 23, 1986 Appointed Auxiliary Bishop of London and Titular Bishop of Carinola, Italy.
- June 24, 1986 Episcopal Ordination at St. Peter's Cathedral, London.
- March 24, 1995 Named Bishop of Thunder Bay, ON.
- May 11, 1995 Installed as the fourth Bishop of Thunder Bay, ON.
- January 16, 1998 Named Bishop of Calgary, AB.
- March 19, 1998 Installed as the seventh Bishop of Calgary, AB.

== Later appointments ==
- Chairman of Episcopal Commission on Christian Education of the Canadian Conference of Catholic Bishops (CCCB) and member of the Management Committee for the National Office of Religious Education.
- Canadian Delegate to 1990 Synod of Bishops - On the Formation of Priests in the Circumstances of the Present Day.
- Liaison Bishop to the English-speaking Seminary Rectors (CCCB).
- Liaison Bishop to Association of Catholic Colleges and Universities of Canada.
- Representative of the Holy See for the Apostolic Visitation of Canadian Seminaries.
- Member of the Executive Committee of the Ontario Conference of Catholic Bishops (OCCB).
- Member of the OCCB Education Commission. Member of the OCCB Health/Medical Ethics Committee.
- Member of the Board of Directors of the Catholic Health Association of Ontario.
- Member of the Board of Directors of Catholic Church Extension Society.
- Member of the Executive and National Council of Development and Peace (CCCB).
- Chairman of the Social Affairs Commission (OCCB).
- Member of the Board of Directors of Southdown.

Henry's staunch positions made him a polarizing figure in the Calgary community. His support came from devout Catholics who agreed with his traditional faith-based views on contemporary issues such as gay marriage. His behaviour and command of the Calgary diocese came with controversy. Two later examples were banning schools and students from using casinos to fund-raise (the traditionally most significant source of extra revenue) and suggesting that school boards in the Calgary Catholic School District ban the distribution of the HPV vaccine.

He was a noted critic of modern trends in government, whether these be the libertarian policies of the Alberta Progressive Conservatives (Provincial Government), or the tendency of certain Canadian federal politicians to overlook their Catholic identities at election time.

== Views ==
=== Same-sex marriage ===
On July 30, 2003, Henry commented on Canadian Prime Minister Jean Chrétien's support for the legalization of same-sex marriage: "I pray for the Prime Minister because I think his eternal salvation is in jeopardy. He is making a morally grave error and he's not being accountable to God... He doesn't understand what it means to be a good Catholic."

=== Abortion ===
After Joe Clark, former Tory leader and a Catholic, described himself as pro-choice, Henry described his comments as "scandalous".

=== HPV vaccine and promiscuity ===
Henry did not allow public health officials to vaccinate students in Catholic schools against human papillomavirus, or HPV. He believed that the HPV vaccine was a partial prophylaxis which was utilized instead of, rather than with, the development of self-discipline and virtue.

== Quotes ==
- "If one happens to be a Catholic, there cannot be a split between one's internal kind of views and thoughts ... and what one says publicly. One has a duty, whether he likes it or not, to preach the word of God. This is part of the very mission of the Church, which is not confined to guys like myself who wear this funny Roman collar...."

== See also ==
Religious titles
Preceded by Paul John O'Byrne	Bishop of Calgary; 1998–2017	Succeeded by William Terrence McGrattan
Preceded by John Aloysius O’Mara	Bishop of Thunder Bay; 1995–1998	Succeeded by Frederick Joseph Colli
Preceded by Amado Paulino y Hernandez	Titular Bishop of Carinola; 1986–1995	Succeeded by Manfred Melzer
Preceded by Marcel André J. Gervais	Auxiliary Bishop of London, Ontario; 1986–1995	Succeeded by Richard John Grecco
