= Roman Catholic Diocese of Calgary =

Catholic ecclesiastical territory (est. 1912)

Coordinates: 51.0500°N 114.0670°W

Diocese of Calgary Diœcesis Calgariensis
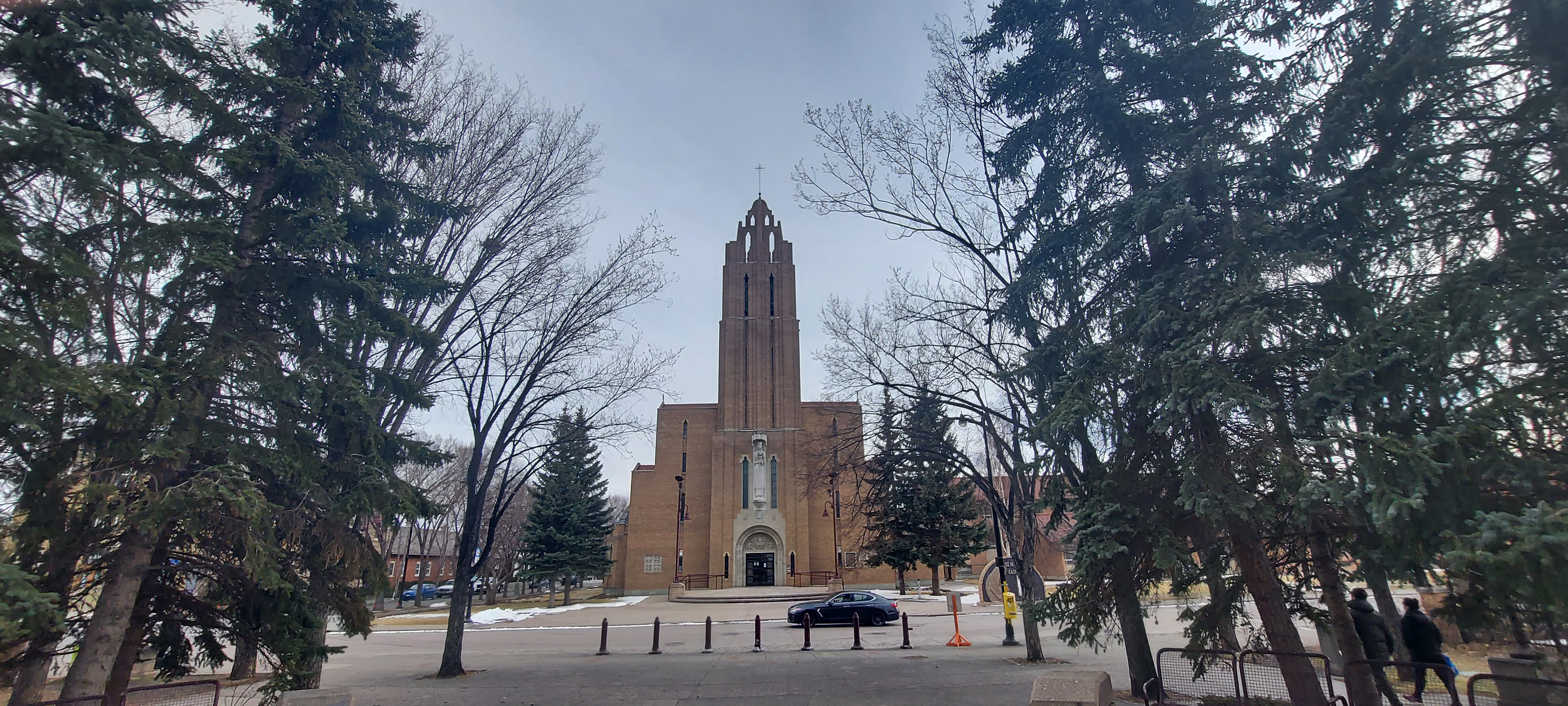
- St Mary's Cathedral

Location
- Country: Canada
- Ecclesiastical province: Edmonton

Statistics
- Area: 110,500 km^{2} (42,700 sq mi)
- Population: Total; Catholics: 1,208,121; 546,400 (45.2%)
- Parishes: 67

Information
- Denomination: Catholic
- Sui iuris church: Latin Church
- Rite: Roman Rite
- Established: 30 November 1912
- Cathedral: St. Mary's Cathedral
- Secular priests: 131

Current leadership
- Pope: Leo XIV
- Bishop: William McGrattan
- Metropolitan Archbishop: Stephen Andrew Hero

Map

Website
- www.calgarydiocese.ca

The Diocese of Calgary (Latin: Diœcesis Calgariensis) is a Latin Church ecclesiastical territory or diocese of the Catholic Church in Alberta, Canada. The Diocese of Calgary is a suffragan diocese of the metropolitan Archdiocese of Edmonton.

Its cathedral episcopal see is St. Mary’s Cathedral, Calgary, Alberta. It is currently led by Bishop William McGrattan.

== History ==
The diocese was established on 30 Nov. 1912 as Diocese of Calgary, Latin adjective Calgarien(sis), on territory split off from the Diocese of Saint Albert.

== Bishops ==
=== Diocesan ordinaries ===
(all Roman Rite)

Suffragan Bishops of Calgary

- John Thomas McNally (1913.04.04 – 1924.08.12); later Bishop of Hamilton (Ontario, Canada) (1924.08.12 – 1937.02.17), Metropolitan Archbishop of Halifax (Canada) (1937.02.17 – death 1952.11.18)
- John Thomas Kidd (1925.02.06 – 1931.07.03), next Bishop of London (Ontario, Canada) (1931.07.03 – death 1950.06.02)
- Peter Joseph Monahan (1932.06.10 – 1935.06.26), next Metropolitan Archbishop of Regina (Canada) (1935.06.26 – death 1947.05.06)
- Francis Patrick Carroll (1935.12.19 – retired 1966.12.28), emeritate as Titular Bishop of Horrea (1966.12.28 – death 1967.02.25)
  - Auxiliary bishop Joseph Lawrence Wilhelm (1963.06.25 – 1966.12.14), Titular Bishop of Saccæa (1963.06.25 – 1966.12.14); later Metropolitan Archbishop of Kingston (Canada) (1966.12.14 – retired 1982.03.12); died 1995
- Francis Joseph Klein (1967.02.25 – death 1968.02.03); previously Bishop of Saskatoon (Canada) (1952.02.28 – 1967.02.25)
- Paul John O'Byrne (1968.06.20 – retired 1998.01.19), died 2004
- Frederick Henry (1998.01.19 – retired 2017.01.04), previously Titular Bishop of Carinola (1986.04.18 – 1995.03.24) as Auxiliary Bishop of London (Canada) (1986.04.18 – 1995.03.24), Bishop of Thunder Bay (Canada) (1995.03.24 – 1998.01.19), died 2024
- William McGrattan (4 January 2017 – ...); previously Titular Bishop of Furnos minor (2009.11.06 – 2014.04.08) as Auxiliary Bishop of Toronto (Canada) (2009.11.06 – 2014.04.08), Bishop of Peterborough (Canada) (2014.04.08 – 2017.01.04).

=== Auxiliary bishop ===
- Joseph Lawrence Wilhelm (1963-1966), appointed Archbishop of Kingston

== Statistics and extent ==
It includes the Calgary Region, all of southern Alberta and the extreme lower half of the Alberta's Rockies region.

As per 2014 it pastorally served 538,000 Catholics (45.5% of 1,183,000 total) on 110,500 km² in 69 parishes with 158 priests (123 diocesan, 35 religious), 50 deacons, 166 lay religious (46 brothers, 120 sisters) and 10 seminarians.

The diocese contains 82+ parishes and missions specifically: 37 parishes in Calgary alone; of which, 10 are ethnic parishes, an additional university parish to serve the University of Calgary and 45+ parishes and missions designated for southern Alberta and the Rockies lower region. On December 3, 2017 Bishop McGrattan announced his intention to make Our Lady of the Rockies Parish in Canmore into a Diocesan Marian Shrine in the spring of 2019.

In 2006: 87 diocesan priests, 38 religious priests 427,200 Catholics. 110 women religious, 48 religious brothers and 30 permanent deacons make up the spiritual work force in Calgary not including the other regions.

In 2026, the diocese reported a 50% increase in the number of people wanting to join the church since the COVID-19 pandemic, with Church’s Rite of Christian Initiation of Adults instructor Brian Trafford saying that the diocese saw a record number of converts in both 2025 and 2026.

=== Calgary city Parishes ===
- Downtown:
  - St. Mary's Cathedral
  - Sacred Heart
  - St. Francis of Assisi
- Northwest:
  - Ascension
  - Canadian Martyrs
  - Corpus Christi
  - Our Lady Queen of Peace (Polish)
  - Our Lady of the Assumption
  - St. Bernard
  - St. Boniface (German)
  - St. Joseph
  - St. Luke
  - St. Peter's
  - St. Pius X
  - University of Calgary Catholic Community
- Northeast
  - Our Lady of Grace (Italian & English)
  - Our Lady of Guadalupe (Spanish & English)
  - Our Lady of Perpetual Help (Chinese & English)
  - St. Mark
  - St. Thomas More
- Southwest
  - Holy Name
  - Holy Spirit (Spanish & English)
  - St. Anthony
  - St. Elizabeth of Hungary (Magyar-Hungarian)
  - Sainte-Famille (French)
  - St. Gerard
  - St. James
  - St. Michael the Archangel
  - St. Mother Teresa Syro Malabar
- Southeast
  - Holy Trinity
  - Our Lady of Fatima (Portuguese & English)
  - Our Lady of Mt. Bistrica (Croatian & English)
  - St. Albert the Great
  - St. Anne (Korean)
  - St. Bernadette
  - St. Bonaventure
  - St. Cecilia's
  - St. John the Evangelist
  - St. Patrick's
  - St. Vincent Liem (Vietnamese)

=== Rural Parishes and Missions ===
Airdrie

- St. Paul

Banff

- St. Mary's

Beiseker

- St. Mary's

Blairmore (Crowsnest Pass)

- Holy Trinity

Bow Island

- St. Michael's
  - Mission: Our Lady of Perpetual Help, Foremost

Brocket

- St. Paul's

Brooks

- St. Mary's

Canmore

- Our Lady of the Rockies

Carstairs

- St. Agnes Catholic Parish

Chestermere

- St. Gabriel the Archangel

Claresholm

- Christ the King
  - Mission: St. Cecilia, Nanton
  - Mission: St. Mary's, Champion

Cluny

- St. Mary's

Coaldale

- St. Ambrose

Cochrane

- St. Mary's

Drumheller

- St. Anthony

Fort Macleod

- Holy Cross
  - Mission: St. Theresa, Cardston

Hanna

- St. George's

High River

- St. Francis de Sales
  - Mission: St. Andrew's, Vulcan

Lethbridge

- Our Lady of the Assumption
- St. Basil's
- St. Patrick's
- St. Martha

Medicine Hat

- Holy Family
- St. Patrick

Milk River

- St. Peter
  - Mission: St. Isidore's, Allerston

Okotoks

- St. James
  - Mission: St. Michael's, Black Diamond

Oyen

- Sacred Heart

Picture Butte

- St. Catherine's

Pincher Creek

- St. Michael
  - Mission: Our Lady of Mt. Carmel, Waterton

Rockyford

- St. Rita

Siksika Nation

- Holy Trinity

Standoff

- Immaculate Conception
  - Mission: four churches on the Blood Reserve

Strathmore

- Sacred Heart

Taber

- St. Augustine

Vauxhall

- St. Joseph

== See also ==
- List of Catholic dioceses in Canada

== Sources and external links ==
- Official website
- GCatholic with Google map and - satellite photo
- Diocese of Calgary page at catholichierarchy.org retrieved July 14, 2006
- Roman Catholic Archdiocese of Edmonton
