= Nicola De Angelis =

Catholic bishop (1939–2023)

His Excellency Nicola De Angelis
- Bishop Emeritus of Peterborough
- Archdiocese: Kingston
- Appointed: 28 December 2002
- Term ended: 8 April 2014
- Predecessor: James Leonard Doyle
- Successor: William Terrence McGrattan
- Previous post: Titular Bishop of Remesiana (1992–2002)

Orders
- Ordination: 6 December 1970 by Philip Francis Pocock
- Consecration: 24 June 1992 by Aloysius Matthew Ambrozic

Personal details
- Born: 23 January 1939 Pozzaglia Sabina, Italy
- Died: 16 June 2023 (aged 84) Montefiascone, Italy
- Motto: UNUM ESTIS IN CHRISTO
- Coat of arms: Nicola De Angelis's coat of arms

Styles of Nicola De Angelis
- Reference style: His Excellency; The Most Reverend
- Spoken style: Your Excellency
- Religious style: Bishop

Nicola De Angelis, C.F.I.C (23 January 1939 – 16 June 2023) was an Italian-Canadian Roman Catholic bishop. De Angelis was Bishop Emeritus of the Diocese of Peterborough in Ontario, Canada.

== Biography ==
Nicola De Angelis was born in Pozzaglia Sabino, Italy, on 23 January 1939. In 1959 he entered the religious order of the Sons of the Immaculate Conception. He immigrated to Canada in 1967 and commenced studies in theology at St. Augustine's Seminary in Toronto. On 6 December 1970, De Angelis was ordained a priest in Toronto, to the Order of the Sons of the Immaculate Conception. During his years in Toronto, Father De Angelis was appointed to the Minister's Advisory Committee for education in Ontario. In the 1970s and early 1980s, he was involved with the Archdiocesan Senate Committee and also with the several Italian Cultural Committees. He was appointed Treasurer General of his religious order in 1984 and moved to Rome to fulfill the duties of this position. On 27 April 1992, he was elected titular Bishop of Remesianna. He was ordained Auxiliary Bishop of Toronto and consecrated in St. Michael's Cathedral on 24 June 1992. On 28 December 2002, Bishop De Angelis was appointed the Bishop of Peterborough.

De Angelis died in Montefiascone on 16 June 2023, at the age of 84.

Catholic Church titles
Preceded by James Leonard Doyle	Bishop of Peterborough; 2002–2014	Succeeded by William Terrence McGrattan
Preceded by Sylvester Donovan Ryan	Titular Bishop of Remesiana; 1992–2002	Succeeded by Francis Ronald Reiss
