= St. Patrick's Roman Catholic Church (Calgary) =

Church building in Alberta, Canada

Coordinates: 50.9221°N 114.0707°W

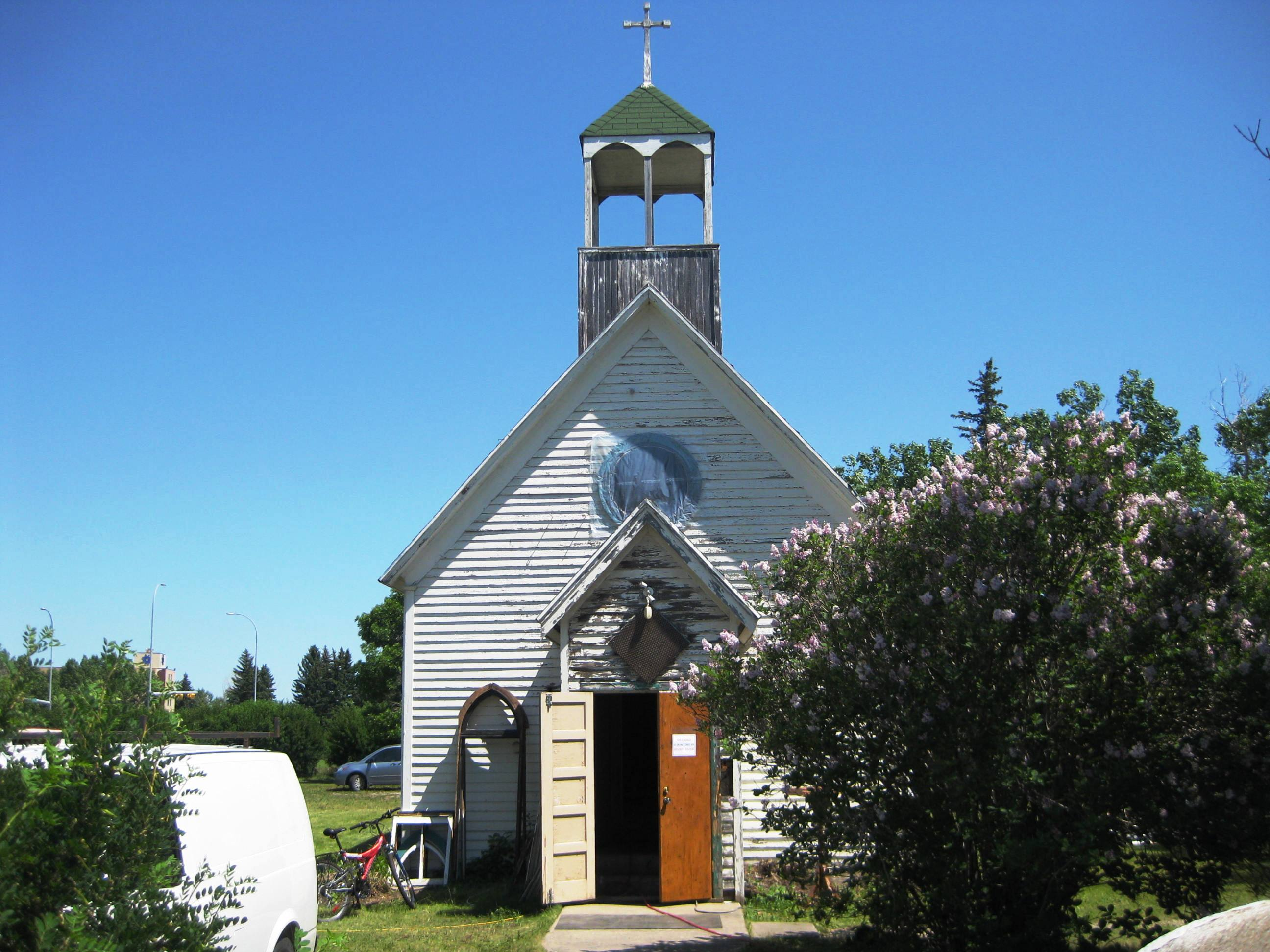
- St. Patrick's Church in 2011.

General information
- Architectural style: Carpenter Gothic
- Location: 14608 Macleod Trail, Midnapore, Calgary, Alberta, Canada
- Construction started: 1904
- Completed: 1904

Technical details
- Structural system: wooden

St. Patrick's Roman Catholic Church is a historic Carpenter Gothic style Roman Catholic church building located at 14608 Macleod Trail in the Midnapore neighbourhood in Calgary, Alberta, Canada. It was built in 1904 by local craftsmen on land donated by Patrick Glenn, son of John Glenn and a member of one of Calgary's pioneer farm families. Its steep pitched roof and lancet windows are typical of Carpenter Gothic churches. St. Patrick's was served by noted missionary priest Fr. Albert Lacombe until his death in 1916. Because of its architecture, its connection with Fr. Lacombe and its significance in the religious development of southern Alberta, it was designated a Provincial Historic Resource on April 10, 2001.

The church is set back from the east side of Macleod Trail, and is located north of St. Paul's Anglican Church, a Registered Historic Resource built in 1885. On a hill directly east of the churches stands Lacombe Home, a Provincial Historic Resource built in 1910. St. Patrick's congregation moved to a new building in 1983. The original St. Patrick's church was later used by Midlands United Church, St. Paul's Anglican Church, and All Saints (Lutheran) Church - but was soon vacant and fell into disrepair. In 1997 the Diocese sold the land to Memorial Gardens Association (Alberta) Limited, and the entire property is registered as a cemetery.

In late 2010 the Roman Catholic Diocese of Calgary reacquired the land and in June 2011 permitted the St. John Chrysostom Russian Orthodox Church to begin rehabilitation of the church and use of it as a place of worship.
