= Albert Lacombe =

French-Canadian Roman Catholic missionary

The Reverend Albert Lacombe OMI
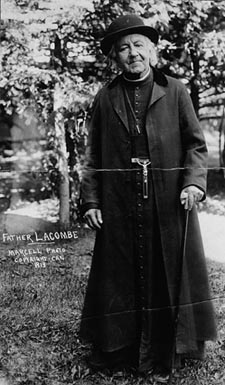
- Father Albert Lacombe circa 1913
- Born: 28 February 1827; Saint-Sulpice, Lower Canada
- Died: 12 December 1916 (aged 89); Midnapore, Alberta

Ecclesiastical career
- Religion: Christianity
- Church: Roman Catholic Church
- Ordained: 13 June 1849
- Congregations: Saint Boniface Cathedral, Winnipeg; St. Patrick's Church, Midnapore

Albert Lacombe OMI (28 February 1827 – 12 December 1916), known as Father Lacombe, was a French-Canadian Roman Catholic missionary who travelled among and evangelized the Cree and also visited the Blackfoot First Nations of the parklands and prairies that later became Alberta, Canada. He is now remembered for having brokered a peace between the Cree and Blackfoot, negotiating construction of the Canadian Pacific Railway through Blackfoot territory, and securing a promise from the Blackfoot leader Crowfoot to refrain from joining the North-West Rebellion of 1885.

== Early life ==
Lacombe was born in Saint-Sulpice, Lower Canada, to Albert Lacombe and Agathe Duhamel on 28 February 1827. Since his parents were farmers, most of his early life was spent on the family farm. However, he was from an early age highly religious. At age 22, he was ordained a priest on 13 June 1849, following studies at the Collège de l'Assomption in L'Assomption, Canada East.

Following ordination, he was sent west to Pembina, Minnesota Territory, where he worked from 1849 to 1851 with the Jesuit priest, Fr George Belcourt. In 1851 he returned briefly to Canada East, where he secured a position as a curate in the town of Berthier.

== Moving west ==
Lacombe was dissatisfied in Canada East, and in 1852 he followed Monsignor Alexandre Taché, then suffragan bishop of Saint Boniface, to the Red River Colony. Later in 1852, Father Lacombe proceeded to Fort Edmonton and Lac Ste. Anne, where he overwintered with the Cree and Métis. It was during this time that he began his studies of the Cree language, which ultimately led to a translation of the New Testament into Cree, as well as a grammar and dictionary of the Cree language co-written with fellow Oblate, Constantine Scollen, at Rocky Mountain House in 1870.

After relocating to Lac Ste. Anne, Lacombe concerned himself during the period from 1853 to 1861 with expanding the mission and deepening his ties to the Indigenous population, eventually travelling as far north as the Lesser Slave Lake in search of converts. He began his novitiate in the Oblate order in 1855 under René Rémas and became a member of the congregation on 28 September 1856. During his years at Lac Ste. Anne, Lacombe visited Jasper House, Fort Edmonton (Edmonton), Lac la Biche, Lesser Slave Lake and Fort Dunvegan (Dunvegan).

Despite his good relations with the Indigenous peoples, Father Lacombe had, by 1861, been unsuccessful in persuading the Cree near Lac Ste. Anne to abandon their nomadic lifestyle. He therefore sought out a new mission site more suitable for agriculture, and in 1861 a settlement was established along the Sturgeon River at Saint Albert, Rupert's Land, just west of Fort Edmonton.

== A broader mission ==
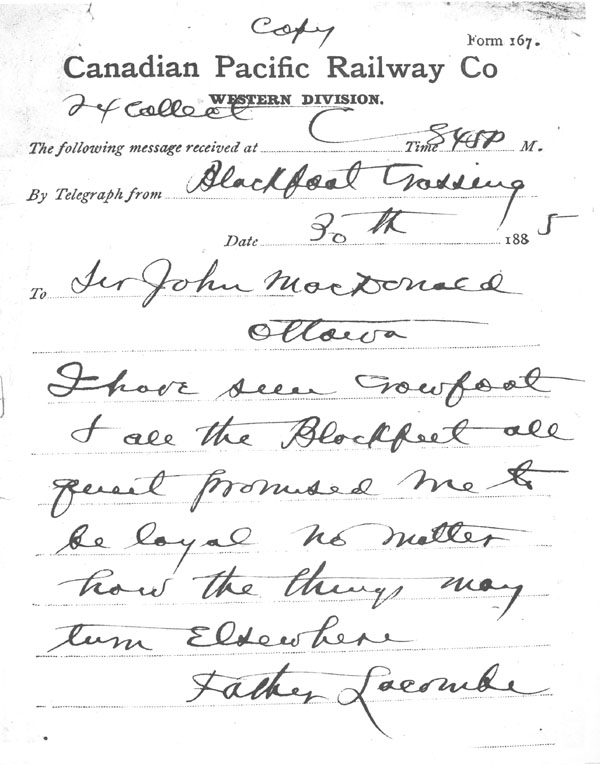
Telegram from Lacombe to Macdonald assuring Crowfoot's loyalty

In 1864 he was tasked with evangelizing the Cree Plains Indians, and from 1865 to 1872, he travelled extensively throughout the prairies. It was during this time that he brokered a peace between the Cree and the Blackfoot.

In 1872 Lacombe was sent to Fort Garry (modern Winnipeg, Manitoba) to promote the colonization of Manitoba, and to this end travelled throughout eastern Canada and the United States. He became the vicar of Saint Boniface in 1879. It was during this period that he began his association with the Canadian Pacific Railway and extended his ministry to the navvies working on the right-of-way. Among those navvies was Yellowhead and his Iroquois followers who worked across Canada on the Canadian Pacific Railway, until the railway was through the Rocky Mountains at Banff, after which Yellowhead appealed to Father Lacombe to assist him in acquiring a land base. The Michel Reserve, land to the north of St. Albert, was arranged by Father Lacombe, and given to Yellowhead's Iroquois followers. In 1882, he relocated to Calgary following the retirement of Constantine Scollen from the southern Alberta missions. When the CPR was preparing to lay track through Blackfoot territory against their wishes, he negotiated an agreement with the Blackfoot leader Crowfoot that allowed the railway to pass through Blackfoot land. Crowfoot was given a lifetime pass to travel on the railway by CPR president William Van Horne, as was Lacombe. When the North-West Rebellion erupted in 1885, Prime Minister Sir John A. Macdonald enlisted Father Lacombe's assistance in assuring the neutrality of the Blackfoot. Although Cree braves commanded by Poundmaker and Big Bear were involved in the fighting, Crowfoot, believing the rebellion to be a lost cause, kept his warriors out of the conflict. Lacombe eventually wrote a biography on Crowfoot upon his death.

== Final years ==
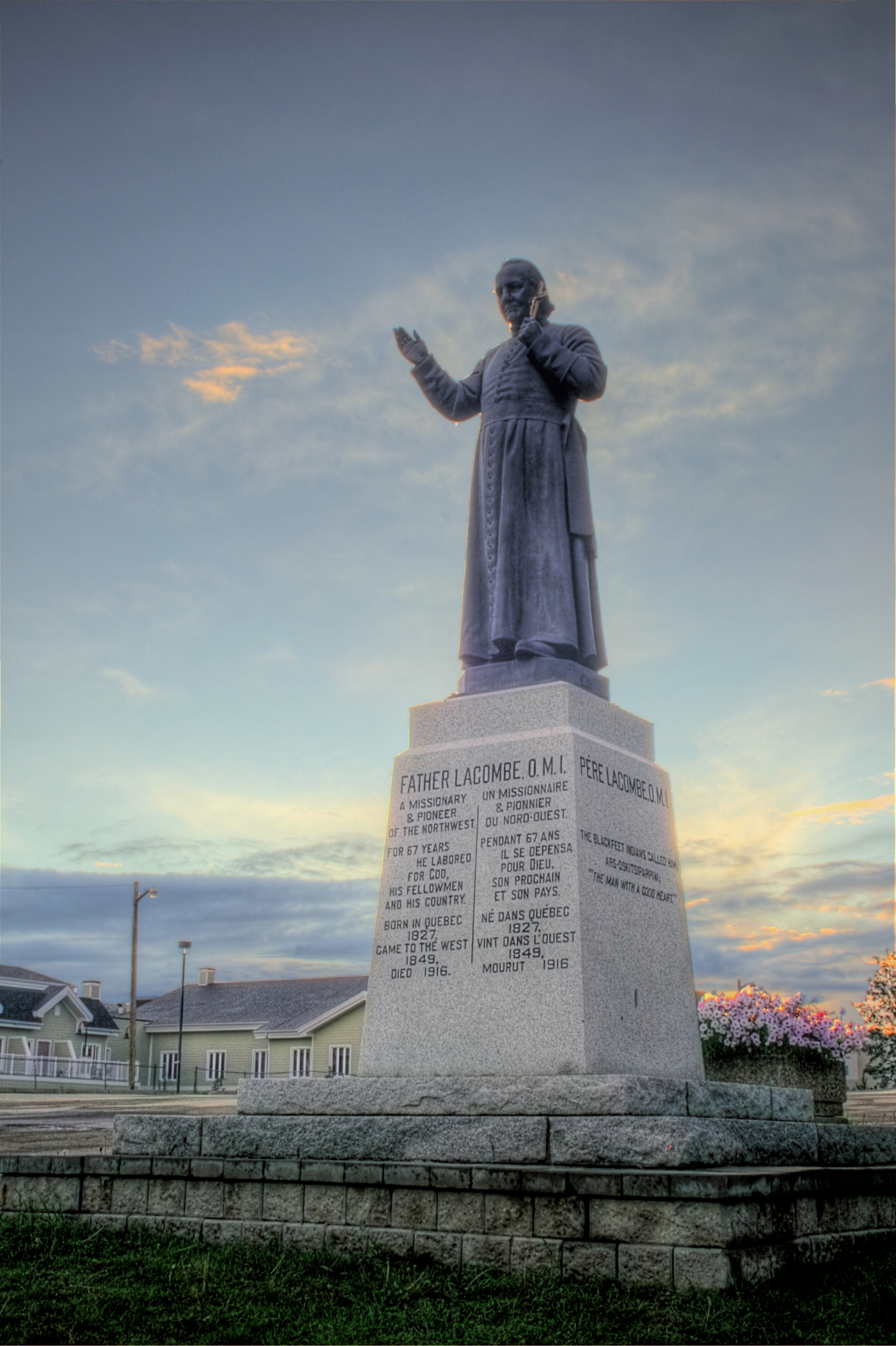
Statue commemorating Lacombe in St. Albert, Alberta

For the remainder of his life, Lacombe played a major role in founding schools throughout the West, such as St Mary's School in what is now the Mission District of Calgary. His last major travels were to Europe in 1900 and 1904, where he visited Austria and met Emperor Franz Joseph I. He also travelled to Galicia (now largely modern Poland and Ukraine) to promote Galician settlement of Canada. Lacombe served St. Patrick's Church in Midnapore (now a neighbourhood in Calgary) from its construction in 1904 until his death in 1916. His body was interred in the crypt of the St. Albert parish church, but his heart was placed in a reliquary at a convent in Midnapore. In 1992 the heart was interred in a small cemetery on the grounds of Father Lacombe Care Centre, Calgary. Lacombe was instrumental in the establishment of Father Lacombe Care Society, which has carried on his legacy of assisting sick or elderly people.

== Legacy ==
A high school in Calgary, Father Lacombe High School, was established in 1979 bearing his namesake. Additionally, an elementary school, Albert Lacombe, is named for him in St. Albert, Alberta. The cities of Lacombe, Alberta and St. Albert, Alberta, are also named in his honour.

In 1932, Lacombe was recognized as a National Historic Person by the government of Canada. A plaque commemorating this is on the north side of the North Saskatchewan River on Highway 36, Brosseau, Alberta. In addition, the work of Lacombe with the Blackfoot and John McDougall with the Cree, in helping to maintain peace, in 1885, was recognized in 1932. A plaque commemorating this can be found at the west end of city park Wetaskiwin, Alberta.

== Film portrayal ==
Lacombe was portrayed by actor John Hamilton in a minor role in the 1949 Hollywood film Canadian Pacific.
