= Vincent Nguyen =

Canadian Catholic prelate (born 1966)

The Most Reverend Vincent Nguyen
- Auxiliary Bishop of Toronto
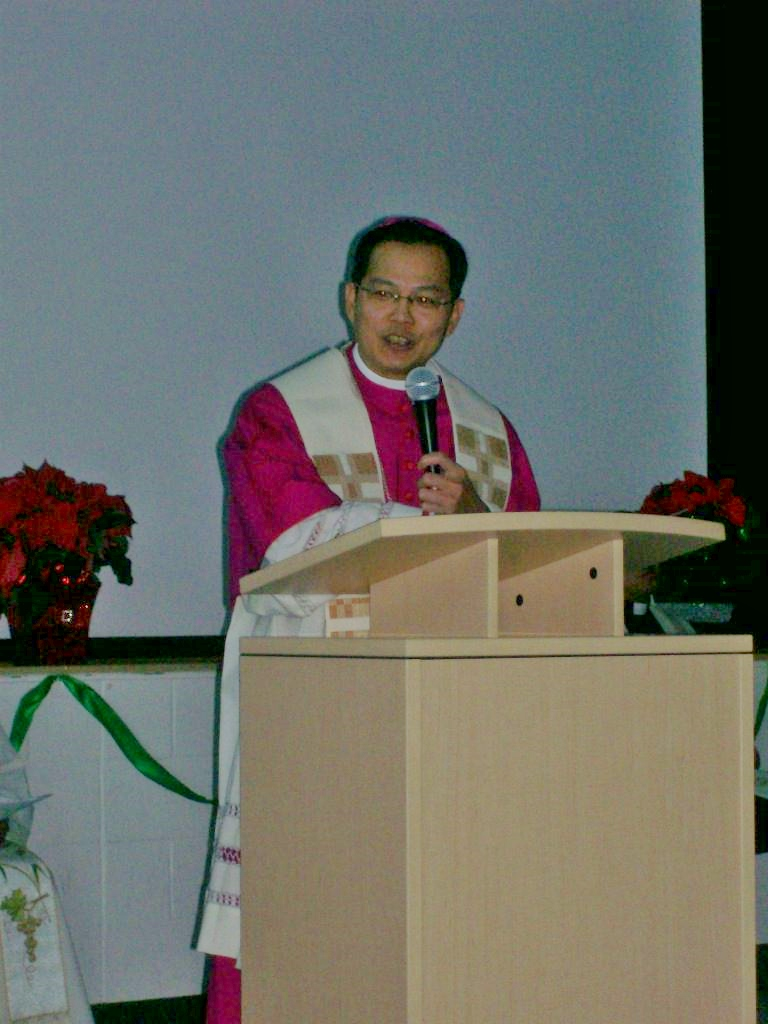
- Nguyen in 2013, speaking at the opening of Blessed Pier Giorgio Frassati Catholic School in Scarborough, Ontario.
- Native name: Vinh Sơn Nguyễn Mạnh Hiếu
- Archdiocese: Toronto
- Appointed: November 6, 2009
- Installed: January 13, 2010
- Other post: Titular Bishop of Ammaedara

Orders
- Ordination: May 9, 1998
- Consecration: January 13, 2010 by Thomas Collins

Personal details
- Born: May 8, 1966 (age 60) Gia Định, Sài Gòn, Republic of Việt Nam
- Denomination: Catholic
- Education: University of Toronto (BAS); St. Augustine's Seminary (M.Div); Pontifical University of Saint Thomas Aquinas (JCL)
- Motto: Ego vobiscum sum; (I am with you); (Thầy ở cùng các con)
- Styles
- Reference style: The Most Reverend
- Spoken style: Your Excellency
- Religious style: Bishop

Vincent Hieu Manh Nguyen (born May 8, 1966) is a Vietnamese Canadian Catholic prelate serving as auxiliary bishop of the Archdiocese of Toronto since 2010.

Nguyen is Canada's first bishop of Asian and Vietnamese descent. He is currently the third youngest Bishop in Canada.

== Biography ==
=== Early life and education ===
Nguyễn Mạnh Hiếu was born on May 8, 1966 in Gia Định, Sài Gòn in what was then South Vietnam to Vincent Nguyễn Thế Tấn and Maria Đặng Thị Phượng. He was the sixth of 7 boys and 2 girls, and his paternal great-grandfather is among the Vietnamese Martyrs. His family came to Saigon after moving from Nam Định during the Operation Passage to Freedom.

His parents later moved the family to Hố Nai, Biên Hòa, due to a lack of suitability and convenience for making a living. In 1972, the family moved again to find stability and settled in Phú Long Parish of the Diocese of Ban Mê Thuột. His parents worked as farmers in the country to help provide their children with an education. As a youth, Nguyen actively participated in the parish and was a musician in the choir.

His mother later died in 1979, and Nguyen traveled to Vũng Tàu to further his education a year later. In 1981, he began to leave Vietnam at the age of 15, and fled by boat two years later and landed in Japan. During a year there, he cared for the people of the refugee camps and the disabled. He eventually settled in Canada with two of his older brothers in 1984, nine years after the Fall of Saigon, which ended the Vietnam War. His father also moved the family to Sacred Heart Parish in 1989. Nguyen graduated from the University of Toronto with a Bachelor of Applied Science in electrical engineering. He later entered St. Augustine's Seminary in 1993, and graduated with a Master of Divinity five years later.

=== Priesthood ===
Nguyen was ordained a priest on May 9, 1998. He then did further studies in Rome, where he received a Licentiate of Canon Law from the Angelicum. In September 2009, he began serving as chancellor and moderator of the curia of the archdiocese.

=== Episcopate ===
On November 6, 2009, Nguyen was appointed by Pope Benedict XVI as one of two new Auxiliary Bishops for the Archdiocese of Toronto, along with William McGrattan, and titular bishop of Ammaedara.
