= Aloysius Ambrozic =

Cardinal

His Eminence Aloysius Ambrozic
- Cardinal, Archbishop emeritus of Toronto
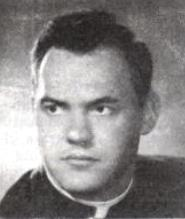
- See: Toronto
- Appointed: May 22, 1986 (Coadjutor)
- Installed: March 17, 1990
- Term ended: January 30, 2007
- Predecessor: Gerald Emmett Carter
- Successor: Thomas Christopher Collins
- Other post: Cardinal-Priest of Santi Marcellino e Pietro
- Previous post: Coadjutor Archbishop of Toronto (1986-1990)

Orders
- Ordination: June 4, 1955 by James Charles McGuigan
- Consecration: March 26, 1978 by Philip Francis Pocock
- Created cardinal: February 21, 1998 by Pope John Paul II
- Rank: Cardinal-Priest

Personal details
- Born: Alojzij Matej Ambrožič; January 27, 1930 Gabrje, Kingdom of Yugoslavia (modern-day Slovenia)
- Died: August 26, 2011 (aged 81) Toronto, Ontario
- Buried: Holy Cross Catholic Cemetery, Thornhill, Ontario
- Motto: Iesus est Dominus; (Jesus is Lord)

Styles of Aloysius Ambrozic
- Spoken style: Your Eminence
- Informal style: Cardinal
- See: Toronto (emeritus)

Aloysius Matthew Ambrozic (born Alojzij Matej Ambrožič; January 27, 1930 – August 26, 2011) was a Slovene Canadian Catholic prelate who served as Archbishop of Toronto from 1990 to 2007. He was made a cardinal in 1998.

== Biography ==
Ambrozic was born near Gabrje in the Kingdom of Yugoslavia (modern-day Slovenia) as Alojzij Matej Ambrožič, one of seven children of Alojzij "Lojze" Ambrožič and Helena Pečar. In May 1945, he and his family fled to Austria, after which he completed high school in Ljubljana and various refugee camps (Vetrinj, Peggez and Spittal an der Drau). The family moved to Canada in September 1948, where he studied at St. Augustine's Seminary in Toronto and was ordained a priest on 4 June 1955. He served first in Port Colborne, Ontario, and later taught at St. Augustine's.

Ambrozic studied theology in Rome and earned a degree from the Angelicum. On his return to Canada, he taught Scripture at St Augustine's Seminary from 1960 to 1967. He then studied at the University of Würzburg in Germany and obtained a doctorate in theology in 1970. Ambrozic taught exegesis at the Toronto School of Theology from 1970 to 1976, when he was named Auxiliary Bishop of Toronto on 27 May 1976. On 22 May 1986, he became Coadjutor Archbishop of Toronto, and he duly succeeded to the position of Archbishop of Toronto on 17 March 1990.

In 1998, Ambrozic was created a cardinal by Pope John Paul II and assigned the titular church of Santi Marcellino e Pietro. He became a member of the Pontifical Council for the Pastoral Care of Migrants and Itinerants in 1990, the Congregation for the Clergy in 1991, the Pontifical Council for Culture in 1993, and the Congregation for Divine Worship and the Discipline of the Sacraments in 1999. During his archiepiscopate, Toronto hosted World Youth Day in 2002.

Ambrozic was one of the cardinal electors who participated in the 2005 papal conclave that selected Pope Benedict XVI. He retired on 16 December 2006. He was succeeded as Archbishop of Toronto by Thomas Christopher Collins on 30 January 2007.

Ambrozic died on 26 August 2011 after a lengthy illness. His funeral Mass was held on 31 August 2011 at Saint Michael's Cathedral in Toronto, with Archbishop Collins presiding. More than 1000 people attended the Mass, including Canadian federal finance minister Jim Flaherty and local mayors Rob Ford of Toronto and Hazel McCallion of Mississauga.

== Views ==
Ambrozic upheld normative Catholic moral theology and as a result he was the subject of vocal opposition from some liberal or progressive Catholics and ex-Catholics for his conservative stands. For example, Ambrozic upheld the Vatican line and was opposed to the concept of same-sex marriage in Canada. However, he was not favourable to traditionalists either, he rejected a request from the Toronto Traditional Mass Society (the local chapter of Una Voce) to invite the Priestly Fraternity of St. Peter to offer Tridentine Masses in the archdiocese.

Catholic Church titles
Preceded by Gerald Emmett Carter	Archbishop of Toronto; 17 March 1990 – 16 December 2006	Succeeded by Thomas Christopher Collins
