= Thomas Collins (cardinal) =

Canadian Catholic cardinal (born 1947)

His Eminence Thomas Christopher Collins
- Cardinal, Archbishop Emeritus of Toronto
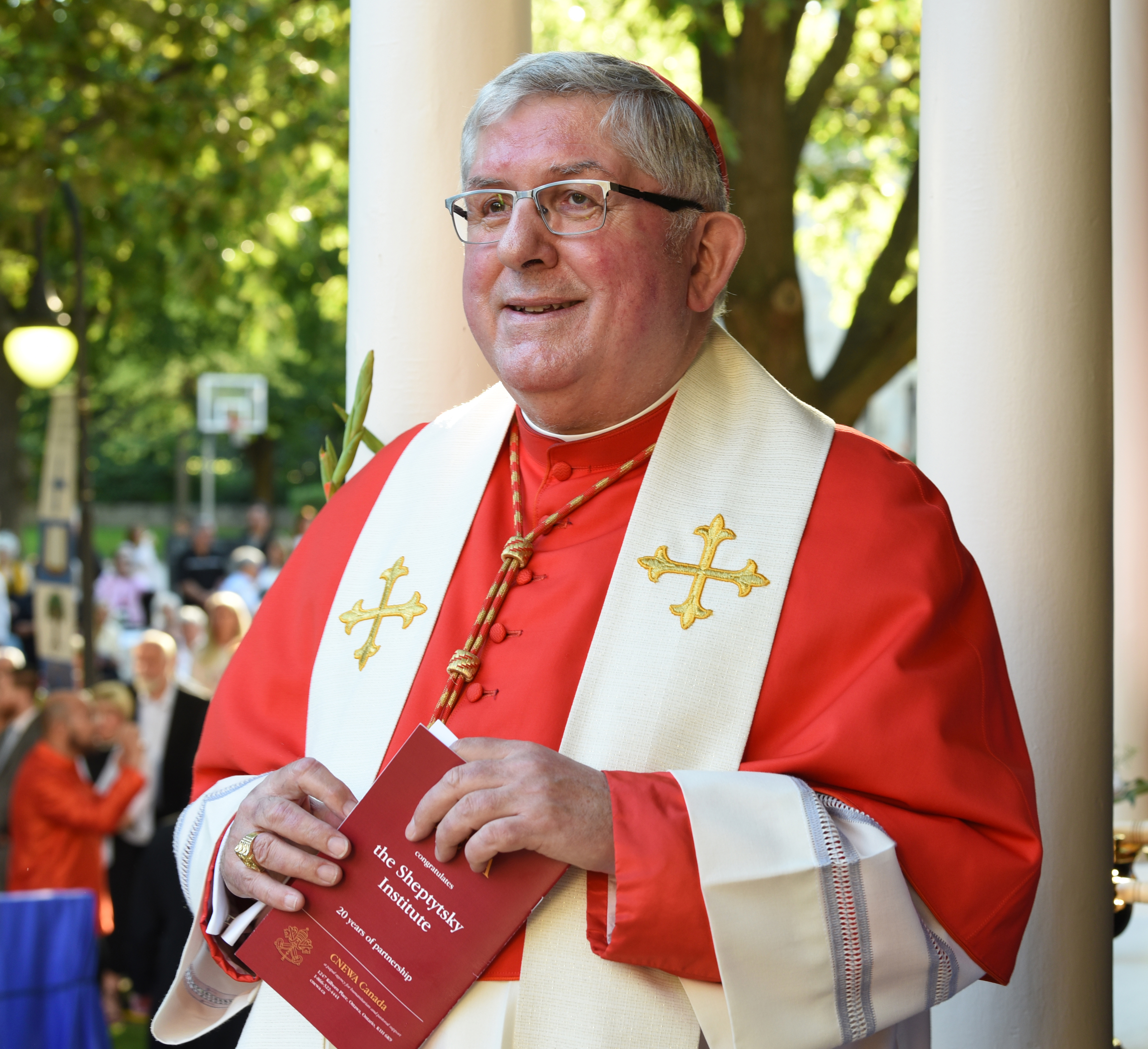
- Collins in February 2014
- See: Toronto
- Appointed: 16 December 2006
- Installed: 30 January 2007
- Term ended: 11 February 2023
- Predecessor: Aloysius Ambrozic
- Successor: Frank Leo
- Other post: Cardinal-Priest of San Patrizio
- Previous posts: Coadjutor Bishop of Saint Paul in Alberta (1997); Bishop of Saint Paul in Alberta (1997–1999); Coadjutor Archbishop of Edmonton (1999); Archbishop of Edmonton (1999–2006); Apostolic Administrator of Saint Paul in Alberta (2001)

Orders
- Ordination: 5 May 1973 by Paul Francis Reding
- Consecration: 14 May 1997 by Anthony Frederick Tonnos
- Created cardinal: 18 February 2012 by Benedict XVI
- Rank: Cardinal-Priest

Personal details
- Born: Thomas Christopher Collins; 16 January 1947 (age 79) Guelph, Ontario, Canada
- Denomination: Roman Catholic
- Education: Bishop Macdonell High School (OSSD)
- Alma mater: St. Jerome College (BA); University of Western Ontario (MA); St. Peter's Seminary (BTh); Pontifical Biblical Institute (SSL); Pontifical Gregorian University (STD)
- Motto: Deum adora ('Worship God'; Revelation 22:9)

Styles of Thomas Christopher Collins
- Reference style: His Eminence
- Spoken style: Your Eminence
- Religious style: His Eminence
- Informal style: Cardinal
- See: Toronto

Ordination history of Thomas Collins
History
Diaconal ordination
- Date: 14 May 1972
Priestly ordination
- Ordained by: Paul Francis Reding (Hamilton, ON aux.)
- Date: 5 May 1973
Episcopal consecration
- Principal consecrator: Anthony Frederick Tonnos (Hamilton, ON)
- Co-consecrators: Raymond Roy (St Paul, AB); John Michael Sherlock (London, ON)
- Date: 14 May 1997
Cardinalate
- Elevated by: Pope Benedict XVI
- Date: 18 February 2012
Episcopal succession
Bishops consecrated by Thomas Collins as principal consecrator
- Joseph Luc André Bouchard: 9 November 2001
- Vincent Nguyên: 13 January 2010
- Wayne Joseph Kirkpatrick: 25 July 2012

Thomas Christopher Collins (born 16 January 1947) is a Canadian cardinal of the Catholic Church. He was the Metropolitan Archbishop of Toronto from 2007 to 2023, the Bishop of Saint Paul in Alberta from 1997 to 1999, and Archbishop of Edmonton from 1999 to 2006. He was elevated to the rank of Cardinal by Pope Benedict XVI on 18 February 2012.

== Early life and education ==
Collins was born in Guelph, Ontario, the son of George Collins, circulation manager of The Guelph Mercury, and his wife, Juliana (née Keen), a legal secretary. He has two older sisters. As a child, he was an altar server at the Our Lady Immaculate Church. He attended St. Stanislaus Elementary School and Bishop Macdonell High School, where he was inspired by one of his English teachers to join the priesthood.

After earning a Bachelor of Arts degree in English from St. Jerome College, Waterloo in 1969, Collins was ordained to the diaconate on 14 May 1972. In 1973, he received a Master of Arts in English from the University of Western Ontario and a Bachelor of Theology degree from St. Peter's Seminary, London.

== Priesthood ==
In secondary school, Collins was inspired by his teacher, Father Newstead, to consider priesthood. Collins was ordained a priest for the Diocese of Hamilton, Ontario, by Bishop Paul Reding on 5 May 1973. He then served as associate pastor at Holy Rosary Parish in Burlington and at Christ the King Cathedral, as well as an English teacher and chaplain at Cathedral Boys' High School. He furthered his studies in Rome, specializing in sacred scripture at the Pontifical Biblical Institute, from which he obtained a Licentiate in Sacred Scripture in 1978.

Upon his return to Ontario in 1978, Collins served as a lecturer in English at King's College and in Scripture at St. Peter's Seminary, where he later became spiritual director (1981) and associate professor of Scripture (1985). Returning to Rome, he completed a Doctorate in Sacred Theology from the Pontifical Gregorian University in 1986. His doctoral dissertation was entitled: "Apocalypse 22:6–21 as the Focal Point of Moral Teaching and Exhortation in the Apocalypse."

After becoming associate editor of Discover the Bible in 1989, Collins returned to St. Peter's Seminary as Dean of Theology and vice-rector in 1992. He later served as rector of St. Peter's from 1995 to 1997.

== Episcopal ministry ==
=== Diocese of Saint Paul, Alberta ===
On 25 March 1997, Collins was appointed Coadjutor Bishop of Saint Paul in Alberta by Pope John Paul II. He received his episcopal consecration on the following 14 May, from Bishop Anthony Tonnos, with Bishops Raymond Roy and John Sherlock serving as co-consecrators, at the Cathedral of Christ the King in Hamilton, Ontario. He selected as his episcopal motto: "Deum Adora", meaning, "Worship God" (Revelation 22:9).

Collins succeeded Bishop Roy as the fifth Bishop of Saint Paul in Alberta upon the latter's retirement on 30 June 1997. He became a member of the National Commission of Theology of the Canadian Conference of Catholic Bishops (CCCB) that same year.

=== Archdiocese of Edmonton ===
Collins was promoted to Coadjutor Archbishop of Edmonton on 18 February 1999, and later succeeded Archbishop Joseph MacNeil as the sixth Archbishop of Edmonton on the following 7 June. He served as president of the Conference of Bishops of Alberta.

In Edmonton Collins initiated monthly lectio divina sessions at St. Joseph's Cathedral Basilica. He also established St. Benedict's Chapel in a vacant store in Edmonton's City Centre Mall for ministry to downtown shoppers and office workers.

Within the CCCB, he served as Chairman of the National Commission of Theology (1999–2001) and Chairman of the National Commission on Christian Unity (2001–2003). He was also a member of the organizing committee for World Youth Day 2002, which was held in Toronto. From 1999 to 2007, he was President of the Alberta Conference of Catholic Bishops. In addition to his duties as ordinary of the Edmonton Archdiocese, he was Apostolic Administrator of Saint Paul in Alberta from 16 March – 8 September 2001.

=== Archbishop of Toronto ===
Collins was named the tenth Archbishop of Toronto by Pope Benedict XVI on 16 December 2006. He succeeded Aloysius Ambrozic there and was installed at St. Michael's Cathedral on 30 January 2007. He served as Chancellor of the University of St. Michael's College and the Pontifical Institute of Mediaeval Studies in Toronto. He is heavily involved in the pro-life movement. Collins was elected president of the Ontario Conference of Catholic Bishops in 2008. Collins was the apostolic visitor to the Archdiocese of Cashel in Ireland following the publication of the Ryan and Murphy Reports in 2009. (Note: Cooney was part of a team that included Cormac Murphy-O'Connor, Cardinal Archbishop Emeritus of Westminster, who inspected Cardinal Brady's Archdiocese of Armagh, Sean O'Malley of Boston, who inspected the Archdiocese of Dublin, Ottawa's Archbishop Terrence Prendergast, who looked at the west of Ireland (Archdiocese of Tuam), and New York Archbishop Timothy Dolan reviewed the Irish seminaries.)

Collins is a member of the Pontifical Council for Social Communications. He has also served as the Delegate of the Congregation of the Doctrine of the Faith for Anglicanorum Coetibus (providing for personal ordinariates for Anglicans entering into full communion with the Catholic Church).

On 18 February 2012, he was created Cardinal-Priest of San Patrizio. In addition to his other duties in the Roman Curia, Collins was appointed a member of the Congregation for Catholic Education.

He was one of the cardinal electors who participated in the 2013 papal conclave that elected Pope Francis.

On 11 February 2023, Pope Francis accepted his resignation as archbishop of Toronto. Collins remains a cardinal and eligible to vote in a papal conclave until the age of 80. His successor, Frank Leo, was made a Cardinal by Pope Francis on 7 December 2024. This means that there are two voting age cardinals in one episcopal see at the same time. Such a situation has likely occurred before (as the Pope is free to do as he wishes in this regard) but is generally avoided, in order to not have two voting-age cardinals from the same archdiocese. He participated as a cardinal elector in the 2025 papal conclave that elected Pope Leo XIV.

== Honours ==
=== Scholastic ===
Chancellor, visitor, governor, rector and fellowships

Location	Date	School	Position
Ontario	2006–Present	University of St. Michael's College	Chancellor

Honorary degrees

Location	Date	School	Degree	Gave Commencement Address
Ontario	21 June 2007	University of St. Michael's College	Doctor of Divinity (DD)	
Nova Scotia		St. Francis Xavier University	Doctorate	

== See also ==
- Archbishop of Toronto
- Roman Catholic Archdiocese of Toronto
- Apostolic visitation to Ireland

== Notes ==
Religious titles
Preceded by Raymond Roy	Bishop of Saint Paul; 30 June 1997 – 18 February 1999	Succeeded by Joseph Luc André Bouchard
Preceded by Joseph Neil MacNeil	Archbishop of Edmonton; 7 June 1999 – 16 December 2006	Succeeded by Richard William Smith
Preceded by Aloysius Ambrozic	Archbishop of Toronto; 16 December 2006 – 11 February 2023	Succeeded by Frank Leo
Preceded by Cahal Brendan Daly	Cardinal-Priest of San Patrizio; 18 February 2012 –	Incumbent
