= List of Catholic churches in Canada =

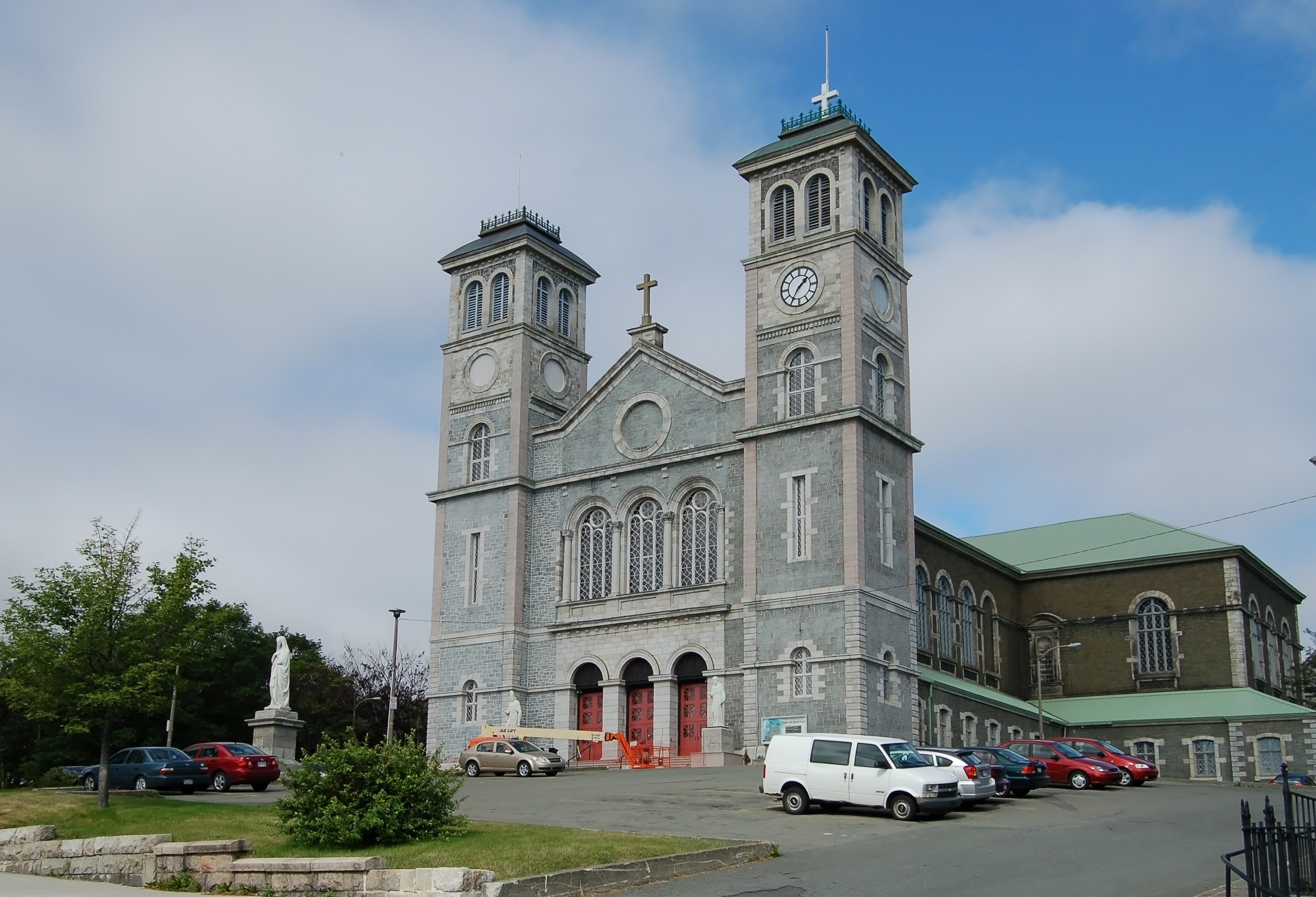
The Basilica of St. John the Baptist cathedral

This is a list of Catholic churches in Canada.

== Cathedrals ==
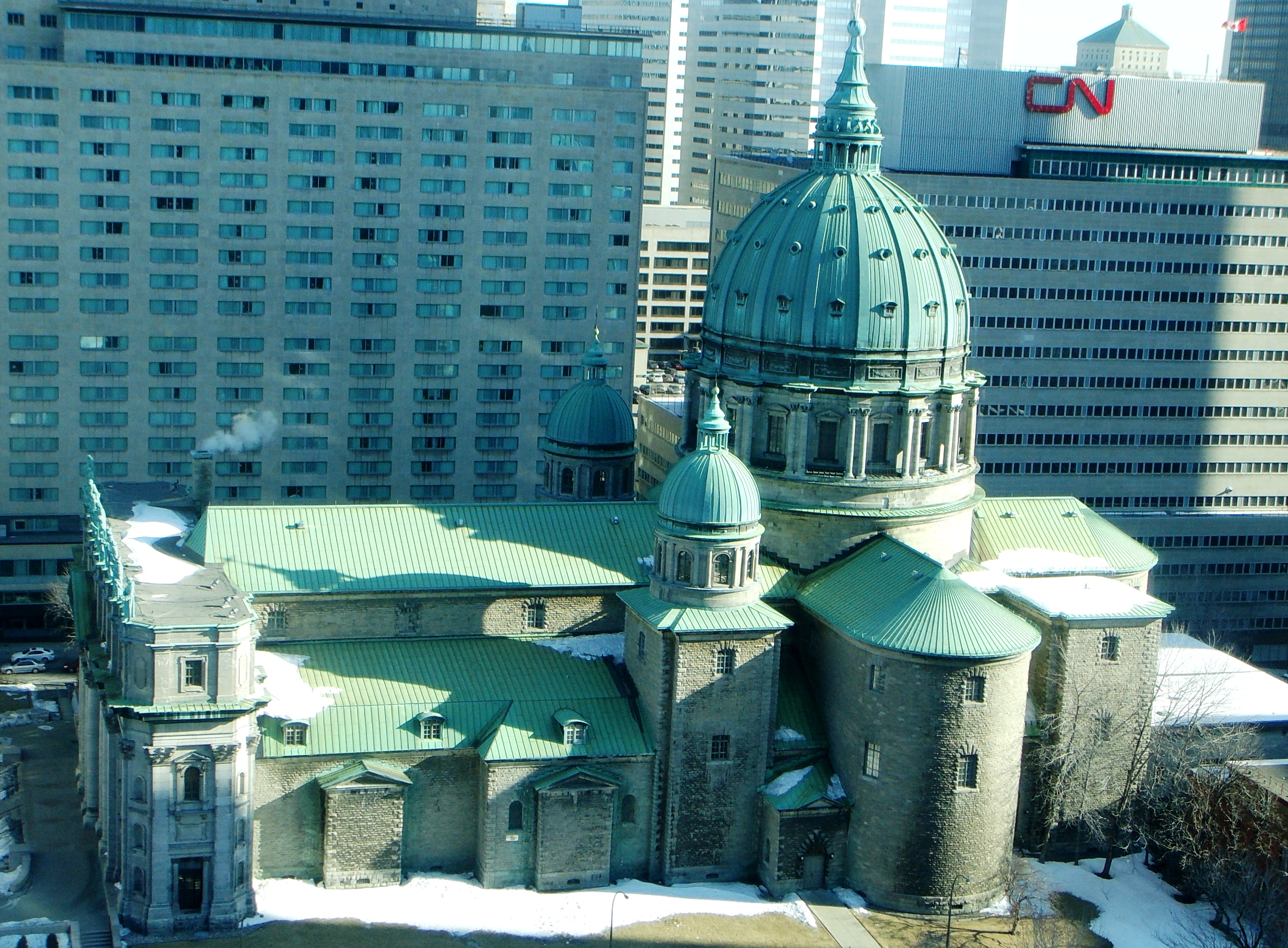
Mary, Queen of the World Cathedral

- Basilica of St. John the Baptist
- Basilique-Cathédrale Sainte-Cécile
- Cathedral of Christ the King (Hamilton)
- Cathedral of St. John the Baptist
- Cathedral of Saint Peter-in-Chains
- Cathedral of the Immaculate Conception (Saint John, New Brunswick)
- Co-Cathedral of Saint-Antoine-de-Padoue
- Holy Family Cathedral (Saskatoon)
- Holy Rosary Cathedral (Vancouver)
- Mary, Queen of the World Cathedral
- Notre-Dame Basilica-Cathedral (Quebec City)
- Notre-Dame Cathedral Basilica, Ottawa
- Our Lady of Assumption Co-Cathedral
- Sacred Heart Cathedral (Bathurst, New Brunswick)
- Sacred Heart Cathedral (Kamloops)
- Saint Boniface Cathedral
- Saint-François-Xavier Cathedral
- Saint-Germain Cathedral
- Saint-Jacques Cathedral (Montreal)
- Saint-Michel Basilica-Cathedral
- St. Andrew's Cathedral (Victoria, British Columbia)
- St. Dunstan's Basilica
- St. Joseph's Basilica, Edmonton
- St. Mary's Basilica, Halifax
- St. Mary's Cathedral (Calgary)
- St. Mary's Cathedral (Kingston, Ontario)
- St. Mary's Cathedral (Winnipeg)
- St. Michael's Cathedral (Toronto)
- St. Patrick's Cathedral (Thunder Bay)
- St. Paul's Cathedral (Saskatoon)
- St. Peter's Cathedral Basilica, London

== Basilicas ==
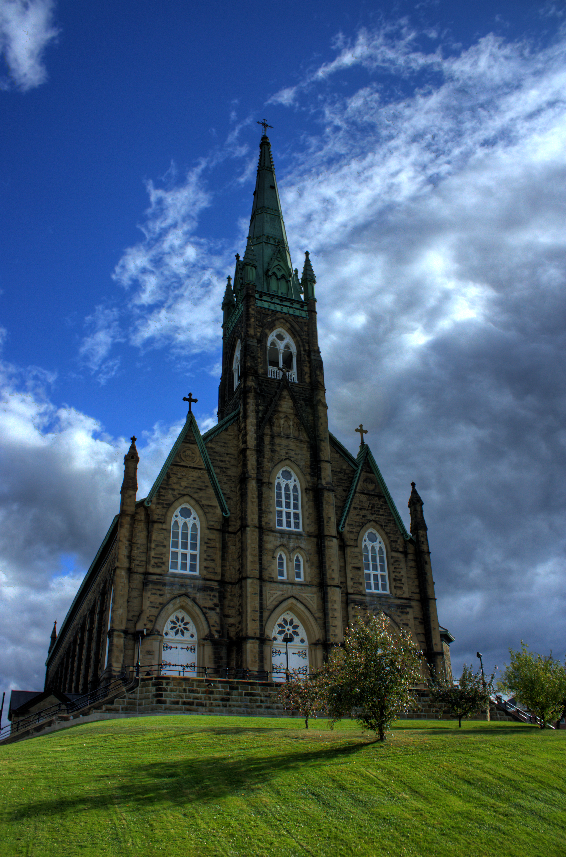
St. Michael's Basilica, Miramichi

- Basilica of Our Lady Immaculate, Guelph
- Basilica of Sainte-Anne-de-Beaupré
- Notre-Dame Basilica (Montreal)
- Notre-Dame-du-Cap Basilica
- Basilica of our Lady of Perpetual Help (Labrador City)
- Sainte-Anne de Varennes Basilica
- Saint Joseph's Oratory
- St. Michael's Basilica, Miramichi
- St. Patrick's Basilica, Montreal
- St. Patrick's Basilica, Ottawa
- St. Paul's Basilica (Toronto)

== Chapels ==
- Jesuit Chapel (Quebec City)
- Notre-Dame-de-Bon-Secours Chapel
- Chapel of Sainte-Anne de Beaumont
- Sainte-Anne-du-Bocage Sanctuary

== Other churches ==
=== Alberta ===
- St. Patrick's Roman Catholic Church (Calgary)

=== British Columbia ===
- Church of the Holy Cross, Skatin
- St. Mark's Church (Vancouver)

=== Manitoba ===
- St. Ignatius Church (Winnipeg)

=== Newfoundland and Labrador ===
- St. Pius X Church (St. John's)

=== Northwest Territories ===
- Church of Our Lady of Good Hope
- Our Lady of Victory Church (Inuvik)

=== Nova Scotia ===
- Église Sainte-Marie, Church Point, Nova Scotia
- St. Patrick's Church (Halifax, Nova Scotia)

=== Ontario ===
- Blessed Sacrament Catholic Church (Ottawa)
- Chinese Martyrs Catholic Church
- Holy Cross Church (Wiikwemkoong)
- Church of the Holy Name, Toronto
- Holy Rosary Church (Guelph)
- Holy Family Roman Catholic Church, Parkdale
- Martyrs' Shrine
- Our Lady of Lourdes Roman Catholic Church (Toronto)
- Our Lady of Sorrows Roman Catholic Church, Kingsway
- Our Lady of the Assumption (Windsor, Ontario)
- Saint Sylvesters Church
- Sacred Heart Kerala Roman Catholic Community-Latin Rite Malayalam Church
- St. Agnes Church (Thunder Bay)
- St. Andrew's Church (Thunder Bay)
- Ste-Anne Catholic Church (Ottawa)
- St. Clement Catholic Church (Cambridge)
- St. Francis de Sales Roman Catholic Church (Ajax, Ontario)
- St. Francis of Assisi, Toronto
- St. John Henry Newman Catholic Church (Toronto)
- St. Joseph (Ottawa)
- St. Leo's Roman Catholic Church, Mimico
- St. Mary's Church, Toronto
- St. Patrick's Church (Toronto)
- St. Peter's Church, Toronto
- St. Teresa Roman Catholic Church, New Toronto
- St. Theresa's Catholic Church (Ottawa)
- St. Vincent de Paul Roman Catholic Church (Toronto)

=== Prince Edward Island ===
- Immaculate Conception Church (Palmer Road)
- St. Brigid's Church, Prince Edward Island
- St. Mary's Roman Catholic Church (Indian River, Prince Edward Island)
- St. Simon & St. Jude Church (Tignish)

=== Quebec ===
- Church of La Visitation-de-la-Bienheureuse-Vierge-Marie
- Church of Nativité-de-la-Sainte-Vierge-d'Hochelaga
- Church of St. Michael and St. Anthony
- Church of the Madonna della Difesa
- Église Sainte-Geneviève (Montreal)
- Église du Très-Saint-Nom-de-Jésus (Montreal)
- Notre-Dame Church (Montreal)
- Église Notre-Dame-des-Sept-Douleurs de Montréal
- Notre-Dame-des-Victoires, Quebec City
- Saint-Ambroise Church
- Saint-Arsène Church
- Saint-Dominique Church (Quebec City)
- Saint-Édouard Church
- Saint-Esprit-de-Rosemont Church
- Église Sainte-Geneviève (Montreal)
- Church of the Gesù (Montreal)
- St. Ignatius of Loyola Church (Montreal)
- Saint-Jean-Baptiste Church (Montreal)
- Saint-Jean-Baptiste Church (Quebec City)
- Saint-Jean-Berchmans Church
- Saint-Joachim de Pointe-Claire Church
- Saint-Léon de Westmount Church
- St. Michel de Sillery Church (Quebec City)
- St. Patrick's Church (Quebec City)
- Church of Saint-Pierre-Apôtre (Montreal)
- Saint-Roch Church (Quebec City)
- Saint-Viateur d'Outremont Church

=== Saskatchewan ===
- Marysburg Assumption Church
- St. Brigitte Roman Catholic Church

== See also ==
- List of Roman Catholic dioceses in Canada
