= St. Agnes Church (Thunder Bay) =

Historic church in Thunder Bay, Ontario, Canada

- St. Agnes Church
- 48.369753°N 89.281809°W
- Location: Thunder Bay, Ontario
- Country: Canada
- Denomination: Roman Catholic
- Website: StAgnesRC.ca

History
- Status: Active
- Founded: 1885
- Founder: Society of Jesus
- Dedication: Agnes of Rome

Architecture
- Functional status: Parish church

Administration
- Province: Toronto
- Diocese: Thunder Bay
- Deanery: Central

St. Agnes Church is a Roman Catholic Parish church in Thunder Bay, Ontario. It was founded by the Society of Jesus in 1885. It is situated in the centre of the city on the corner of Mary Street West and Brown Street.

== History ==
=== Foundation ===
The parish started as The Church of the Nativity and St Agnes, it was staffed by Jesuits from their main centre, the Mission of the Immaculate Conception for the Fort William First Nation. The first priest for St. Agnes' was Fr. Richard Baxter SJ. In 1887, the newly created church was blessed by the Bishop of Peterborough, Thomas Dowling.

From 1907 to 1909, the local population increased by 50%, so the church size was expanded. A basement was added and a separate presbytery was built. Plans were drawn up for an elementary school and it was opened in 1910.

=== Construction ===
On 24 May 1914, a building permit was obtained for the construction of a permanent brick church. On 26 July 1914, the foundation stone was laid by Bishop David Scollard, the first bishop of Diocese of Sault Sainte Marie. The church was completed on 15 January 1915. One month later, the Jesuits handed administration of the church to the Diocese of Sault Sainte Marie.

=== Reconstruction ===
On 29 April 1952, the Diocese of Fort William was created and the parish was part of the new diocese. On 26 February 1970, it was renamed as the Diocese of Thunder Bay.

In July 1965, the parish priest of thirty years, Monsignor A. J. Hogan, retired and the first bishop of the new diocese, Edward Jennings, invited the Missionary Oblates of Mary Immaculate to administer the parish. By 1969, the parish had paid off the debt incurred from its construction, and funds began to be collected for the building a new larger church. In 1979, a building committee was formed. By 1981, $500,000 had been collected. The last Mass at the old church was celebrated on 31 May 1981. On 6 June 1982 the new church was dedicated and opened.

In 1995, the Missionary Oblates of Mary Immaculate handed over the church back to the Diocese of Thunder Bay who continue to serve the parish.

== Parish ==
The church has four Sunday Masses. There is one at 5:00pm on Saturday evening, 9:00am and 11:00am on Sunday morning and at 7:00pm on Sunday evening. There are also weekday Masses at 7:00pm on Tuesday and at 12:10pm from Wednesday to Friday.

== See also ==
- Society of Jesus
- Missionary Oblates of Mary Immaculate
- Diocese of Thunder Bay
- St. Andrew's Church, Thunder Bay
- St. Patrick's Cathedral, Thunder Bay

== Bibliography ==
- Piovesana, Roy, Hope and Charity: Diocese of Thunder Bay, an Illustrated History (Altona: Friesens, 2002)
