= Cathedral of St. Catherine of Alexandria, Saint Catharines =

Cathedral in Ontario, Canada

Cathedral of St. Catherine of Alexandria
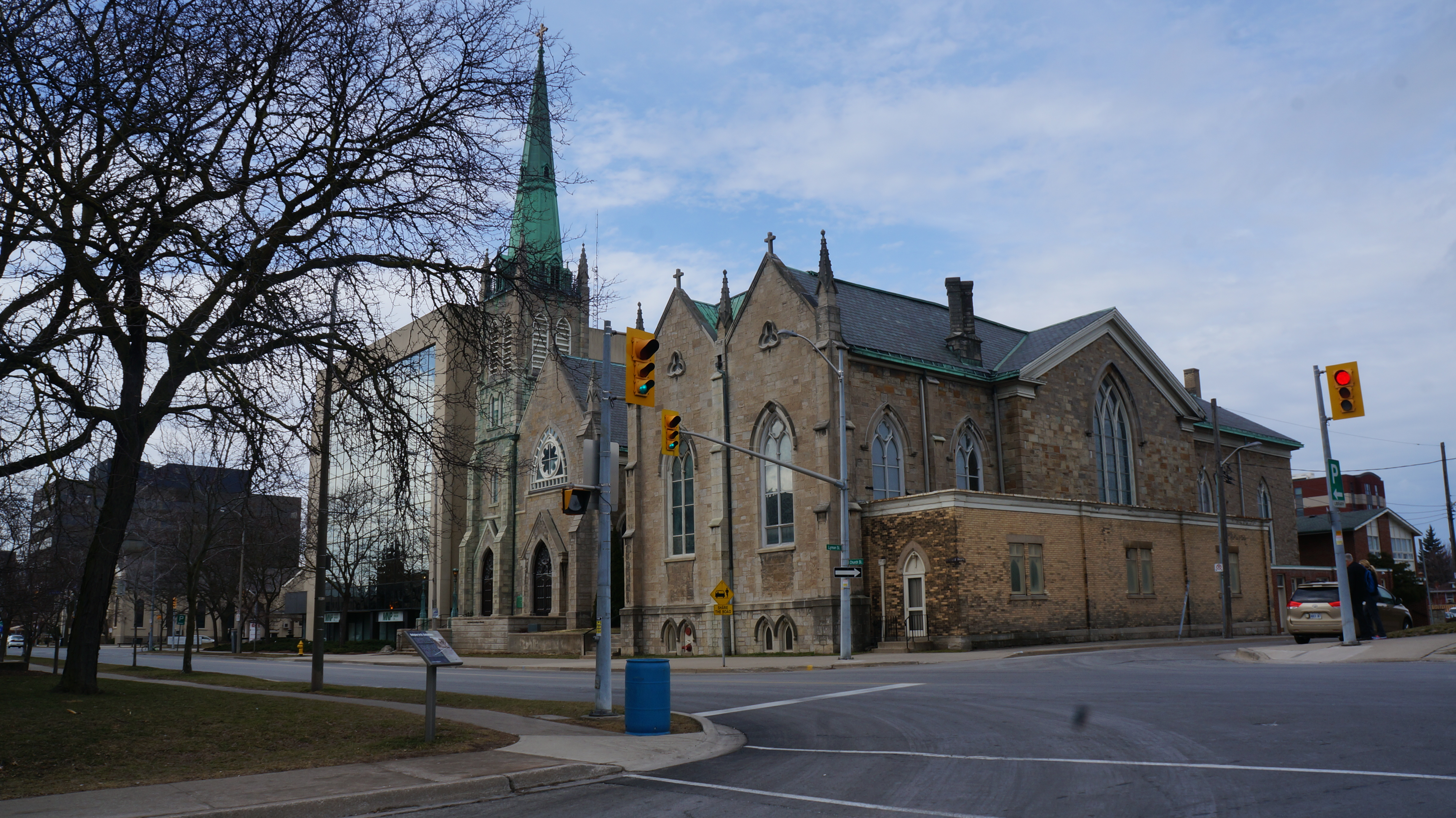
- Cathedral of St. Catherine of Alexandria
- Cathedral of St. Catherine of Alexandria
- 43.160563°N 79.246813°W
- Location: 3 Lyman Street; St. Catharines, Ontario; L2R 5M8
- Denomination: Roman Catholic
- Website: www.thecathedralinstcatharines.com

History
- Status: Cathedral,
- Dedication: Catherine of Alexandria

Administration
- Province: Roman Catholic Archdiocese of Toronto
- Diocese: Saint Catharines

Clergy
- Bishop: Gerard Paul Bergie
- Rector: Father Benjamin Weber

The Cathedral of St. Catherine of Alexandria is the mother church of the Roman Catholic Diocese of Saint Catharines. The cathedral is located in St. Catharines, Ontario.

== History ==
The first Catholic church was opened to meet the spiritual needs of the Irish labourers who built first Welland Canal (opened in 1829). It was a wood structure and stood on the site where the present Cathedral was built. It was blessed and opened by Bishop Alexander Macdonell of Kingston on November 12, 1831. The structure was then burned down by arson on August 23, 1842. At that time, the construction of the second Welland Canal was underway, which resulted in many Irish labourers in the area. With delays in the construction of the canal, the Irish immigrants would use their free time to construct the church. The cornerstone of the present church was laid on May 25, 1843 and the new church was dedicated to St. Catherine of Alexandria, on June 10, 1845.The patronage of St. Catherine of Alexandra was available, since the Anglican church, which was called St. Catherine's had subsequently burned down in 1836 and rebuilt in 1840 and was dedicated to St. George.

On November 25, 1958, it became the Cathedral Church of the newly formed Diocese of St. Catharines.

In honour of the cathedral's 175th anniversary in 2019, the cathedral's interior was fully restored. In 2021, thieves stole the cathedral's tabernacle. It was later recovered in a nearby park, partially submerged in a canal.
