= St. Andrew's Church (Thunder Bay) =

Church and historic building in Thunder Bay, Canada

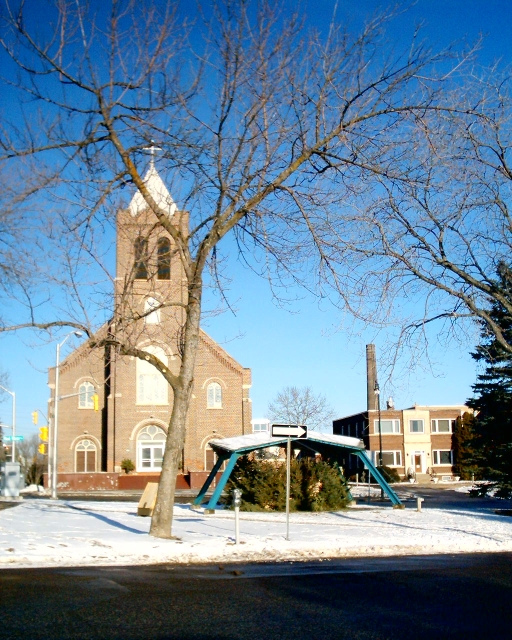
- Connaught Square with the church in the background
- St. Andrew's Church
- 48.436972°N 89.223642°W
- Location: Port Arthur, Thunder Bay
- Country: Canada
- Denomination: Roman Catholic
- Website: Diocese of Thunder Bay

History
- Status: Active
- Founded: 1872
- Founder: Society of Jesus
- Dedication: Andrew the Apostle

Architecture
- Functional status: Parish church
- Architect: G. Emile Tanguay
- Style: Romanesque Revival
- Completed: 1924

Administration
- Province: Toronto
- Diocese: Thunder Bay
- Deanery: Central region

St. Andrew's Church is a Roman Catholic Parish church in Thunder Bay, Ontario. It was founded by the Society of Jesus in the 1872 and is a centre for ministry with the Fort William First Nation. It is situated on Connaught Square in the Port Arthur area of the city.

== History ==
In 1872, the Jesuits founded the parish of St. Andrew in Port Arthur. It was not until 1882 that it found a permanent location. In 1924, a new church was built and the parish moved there. The old church became the paris hall, until 1981 the Dew Drop Inn. The inn serves a community centre for homeless people in the area.

The church was built in 1924 and was designed by G. Emile Tanguay in a Romanesque Revival style. The exterior and the 117 feet high tower remains as it was when it was built. The interior was renovated in 1940 and again after the Second Vatican Council in 1969.

Originally, the parish was in the Diocese of Sault Sainte Marie. In 1952, the Diocese of Fort William was created and was renamed as the Diocese of Thunder Bay in 1970.

In 1997, the Jesuits handed over administration of the church to the Diocese of Thunder Bay who continue to serve the parish.

== First Nations Parishes ==
St. Andrew's was not the first Jesuit presence in Thunder Bay. They set up the Immaculate Conception Mission (French: Mission de L’Immaculée Conception). In July 1849 by two French Jesuit missionaries, Fr Pierre Choné (1808-1879) and Fr Nicolas Frémiot (1818-1854) came to the area and started the mission. From there St. Andrew's Church was one of many churches that was missioned to the First Nations in Northern Ontario, particularly St. Patrick's Church, which in 1952 became the cathedral for the diocese and St. Agnes Church. After St. Patrick's became a cathedral, St. Andrew's became the main centre for the Jesuits from which they would visit other missions. Other various parishes were created, including:

=== St. Anne's Parish ===
After St. Andrew's was handed over to diocese St. Anne's became the centre of the Jesuit missions to the Fort Williams First Nation. It covers the original Immaculate Conception Mission that was created in 1849 in Squaw Bay. From the rectory in the parish the Jesuits travel out to the other First Nations parishes.

=== Kitchitwa Kateri Parish ===
The parish was created as an offshoot of St. Andrew's Church. The Kateri native group met at St. Andrew's parish hall and hosted one Mass every month at the church. When the parish hall became the Dew Drop Inn, the Kateri group created the Kateri Centre at Red River Road and Fr Brian Tiffin SJ was appointed as the Kateri chaplain.

In 1988, the centre moved to Simpson Street and continued to work out of St. Andrew's parish. In the 1990s a search began for a permanent location for a church. On 15 June 1994, a church was purchased that was previously a Community Fellowship Church on Syndicate and Finlayson Street. As well as a place for worship, it had a daycare centre, offices, meetings rooms, a hall, a kitchen and a dining area. In January 1996, it was established as a Native Catholic Church.

=== Our Lady of the Snows Parish ===
In the eastern region of the diocese is Our Lady of the Snows Parish. It serves the local First Nation in Armstrong, Ontario. It also serves the Gull Bay First Nation through the Sacred Heart of Jesus mission.

== See also ==
- List of Jesuit sites
- Society of Jesus
