= Waverley Park (Thunder Bay) =

Park in Thunder Bay, Ontario, Canada

- Autumn foliage in the park.
- Interactive map of Waverley Park
- Location: Thunder Bay, Ontario, Canada
- Coordinates: 48°26′15″N 89°13′36″W
- Area: 2.39 hectares (5.9 acres)
- Operator: City of Thunder Bay, Parks Division
- Public transit: Thunder Bay Transit; 3C 3J 3M 9 11 13

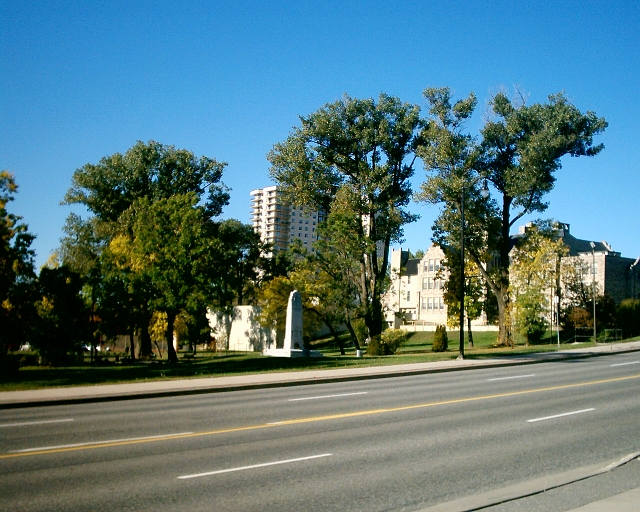
Waverley Park.

Waverley Park is a public park located in the north end of Thunder Bay, Ontario, Canada. It is the second oldest municipal park in Ontario. The park forms the centre of the Waverley Park Heritage Conservation District, a collection of historical homes, churches, schools, and other buildings at the centre of Port Arthur.

The property was surveyed and set aside as parkland by the Crown Lands Department, in the original ordnance survey of the Prince Arthur's Landing town plot in 1871. It was given to the city of Port Arthur in 1907 on the condition that is "not be alienated or leased and that no buildings be erected on it except municipal buildings".

The most notable features of Waverley Park include its giant cottonwood trees, which stand as much as 40 m above the park. In recent years, many have been removed due to advanced age and disease. Other notable features include a fountain, cenotaph, and bandshell. The park is between Waverley Street and Red River Road in Thunder Bay, and is located between two historic schools — Port Arthur Collegiate Institute and Port Arthur Central School — the latter is now home to Magnus Theatre.

== Hogarth Fountain ==
The centrepiece of Waverley Park is the Hogarth Fountain. A gift from the wife of a prominent soldier and politician, Major General Donald McDonald Hogarth (1879–1950), the fountain originated from the Luton Hoo Mansion, in the town of Hitchin, Hertfordshire, England. Its ten tonne Portland stone foundation dates back to 1790. The fountain was purchased and shipped to Waverly Park in 1964, and dedicated on 5 June 1965.

The fountain features nude children in a renaissance style, along with bundles of wheat and garlands of flowers. The water pours from the mouths of lions mounted above leaves which deflect the water away from the center and out into the pool.

The fountain has not been working since 2017.

== Rotary Thundershell ==
The Rotary Thundershell was a large wooden bandshell located in the west corner of the park, behind the gymnasium of Port Arthur Collegiate Institute. The bandshell was built in 1984 and for many years was home to the weekly Summer in the Parks concert series. Its construction was financed using donations from various local groups and companies, which are commemorated on a plaque located on the bandshell. The bandshell was replaced in 2018 by a multipurpose bandstand constructed by Finnway Contracting and paid for with funds raised by The Coalition For Waverley Park. The Coalition For Waverley Park and The ThunderBay Musician's Association hold a Waverley Park Concert Series on Monday evenings during July and August.

== Port Arthur Cenotaph ==
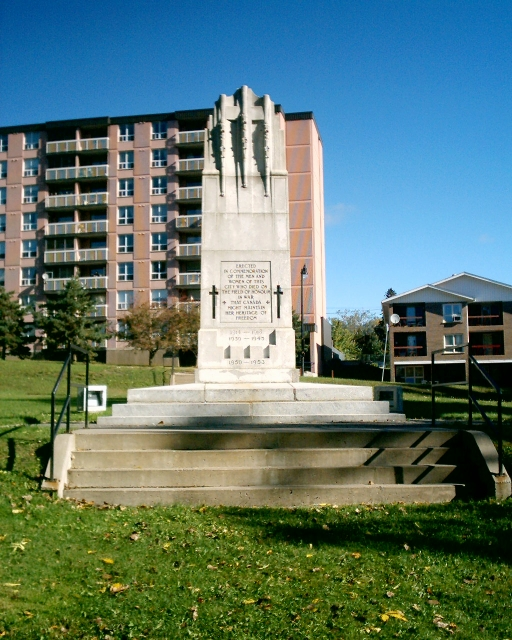
The Port Arthur Cenotaph

The Port Arthur Cenotaph was originally built in remembrance of local soldiers who died during World War I, and was updated for both the Second World War and the Korean War. It was erected in 1925 by the McCallum Granite Company of Kingston, Ontario, through the efforts of the Women's Canadian Club at a cost of $8,000.

The design of the cenotaph is simple. Both immense and yet stark, with simplistic lines, the monument is identical on either side.

The inscription reads:

ERECTED IN COMMEMORATION OF THE MEN AND WOMEN OF THIS CITY WHO DIED ON THE FIELD OF HONOUR IN WAR THAT CANADA MIGHT MAINTAIN HER HERITAGE OF FREEDOM

Below it are the dates of World War I, World War II, and the Korean War.

== Magnus Theatre ==
Founded in 1971, Magnus Theatre relocated to the old Port Arthur Central School in 2001. Located on the eastern corner of the park, the 123-year-old structure was expanded in 1999 to accommodate the theatre. After renovations landscaping was designed to incorporate it into the existing Waverley Park. The grounds of Magnus Theatre feature a memorial garden in the shape of the former schools baseball diamond, lighted pathways, and various trees and shrubs.

== Memorial Garden ==
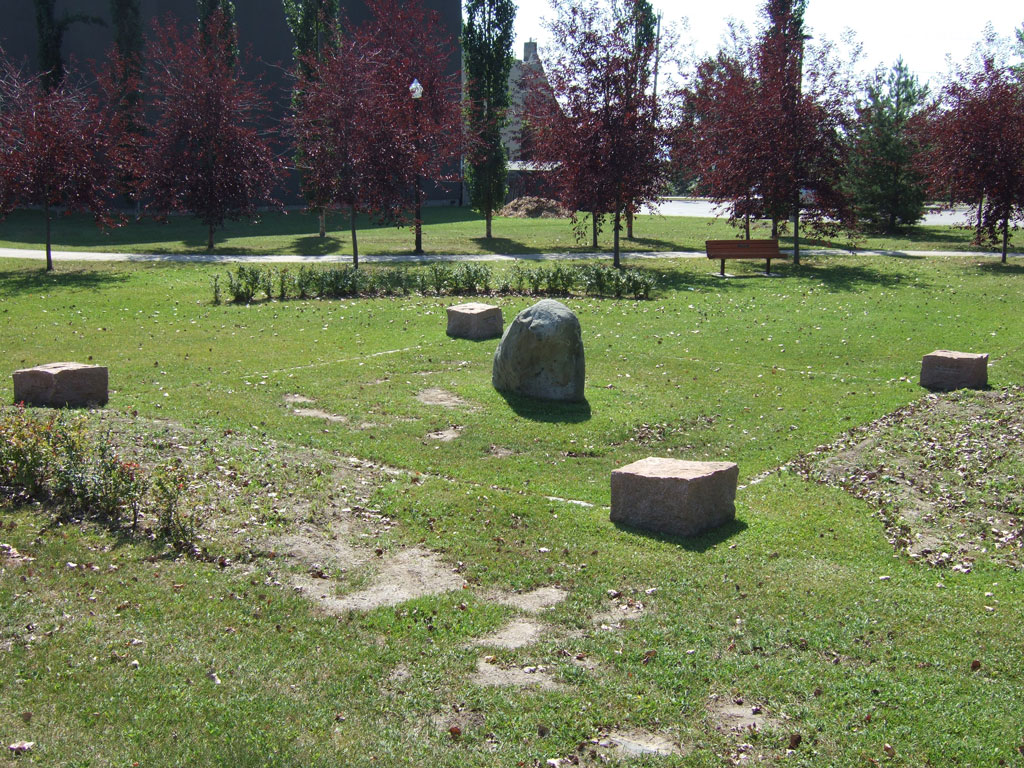
Memorial Garden - August 28, 2010

The memorial garden has stones laid out in the shape of a baseball diamond. The bases and home plate are represented by cubic stones with inscriptions. A large, irregularly shaped rock located in the centre represents the pitcher's mound with a plaque that reads:

FIELD OF DREAMS

CENTRAL SCHOOL BASEBALL DIAMOND

IN MEMORY OF VISIONARIES
Jim Griffis
Wilda Lowcock
Clark MacDonald
Bones McCormack
John Fancy
THE COALITION FOR WAVERLEY PARK

2003

Each of the stones that represent the baseball plates have inscriptions that read as follows:

Home: A JEWEL IN THE HEART OF THE CITY

First: WE DREAMED OF THIS SPECIAL PLACE
Second: FOR YOU AND YOUR CHILDREN TO SHARE
Third: THE PEACE BENEATH THE TREES

== Port Arthur Collegiate Institute ==
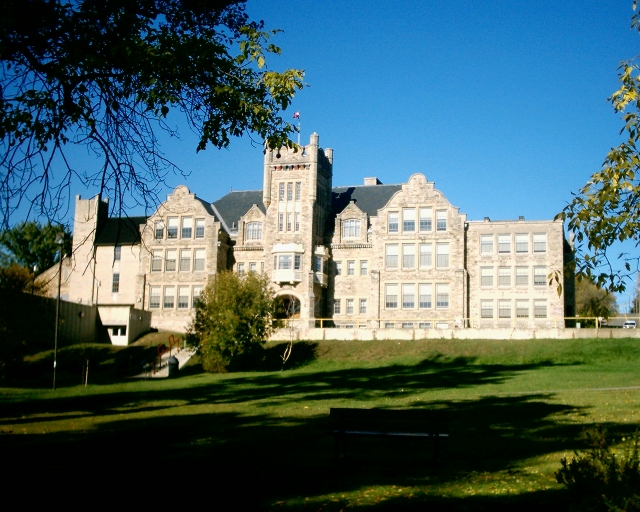
Port Arthur Collegiate Institute towers over Waverley Park.

At the westernmost end of Waverley Park is the former Port Arthur Collegiate Institute, which was the oldest high school west of Toronto, Ontario. The large castle-like edifice was constructed in 1909-10 of Simpson Island sandstone, and incorporated medieval and Flemish architectural features. Being located on a hill, it has a very imposing nature when viewed from the park below. Its site was chosen by Montreal landscape architect Frederick Todd, and its architects were Young and Simpson of Toronto.

The hill on which the school is located was the shore of the post glacial lake which preceded Lake Superior, and is composed mainly of beach sand.

== See also ==
- Connaught Square (Thunder Bay)
