= John Aloysius O'Mara =

Canadian priest (1924–2022)

- Bishop of Saint Catharines
- Church: Catholic Church
- Diocese: Diocese of Saint Catharines
- In office: 2 February 1994 – 9 November 2001
- Predecessor: Thomas Benjamin Fulton
- Successor: James Matthew Wingle
- Previous post: Bishop of Thunder Bay (1976-1994)

Orders
- Ordination: 1 June 1951 by James McGuigan
- Consecration: 29 June 1976 by Philip Pocock

Personal details
- Born: 17 November 1924 Buffalo, New York, United States
- Died: 16 February 2022 (aged 97) St. Catharines, Ontario, Canada

John Aloysius O’Mara (17 November 1924 – 16 February 2022) was an American-born Canadian Roman Catholic prelate.

O’Mara was born in Buffalo, Erie County, New York, United States, and was ordained to the priesthood for the Roman Catholic Archdiocese of Toronto, Canada. He served as the bishop of the Roman Catholic Diocese of Thunder Bay, Canada, from 1976 to 1991 and as bishop of the Roman Catholic Diocese of Saint Catharines, Canada, from 1991 until his retirement in 2002. O’Mara died on 16 February 2022, at the age of 97.
