= Harris, Saskatchewan =

Village in Saskatchewan, Canada

Harris
- Village
- Village of Harris
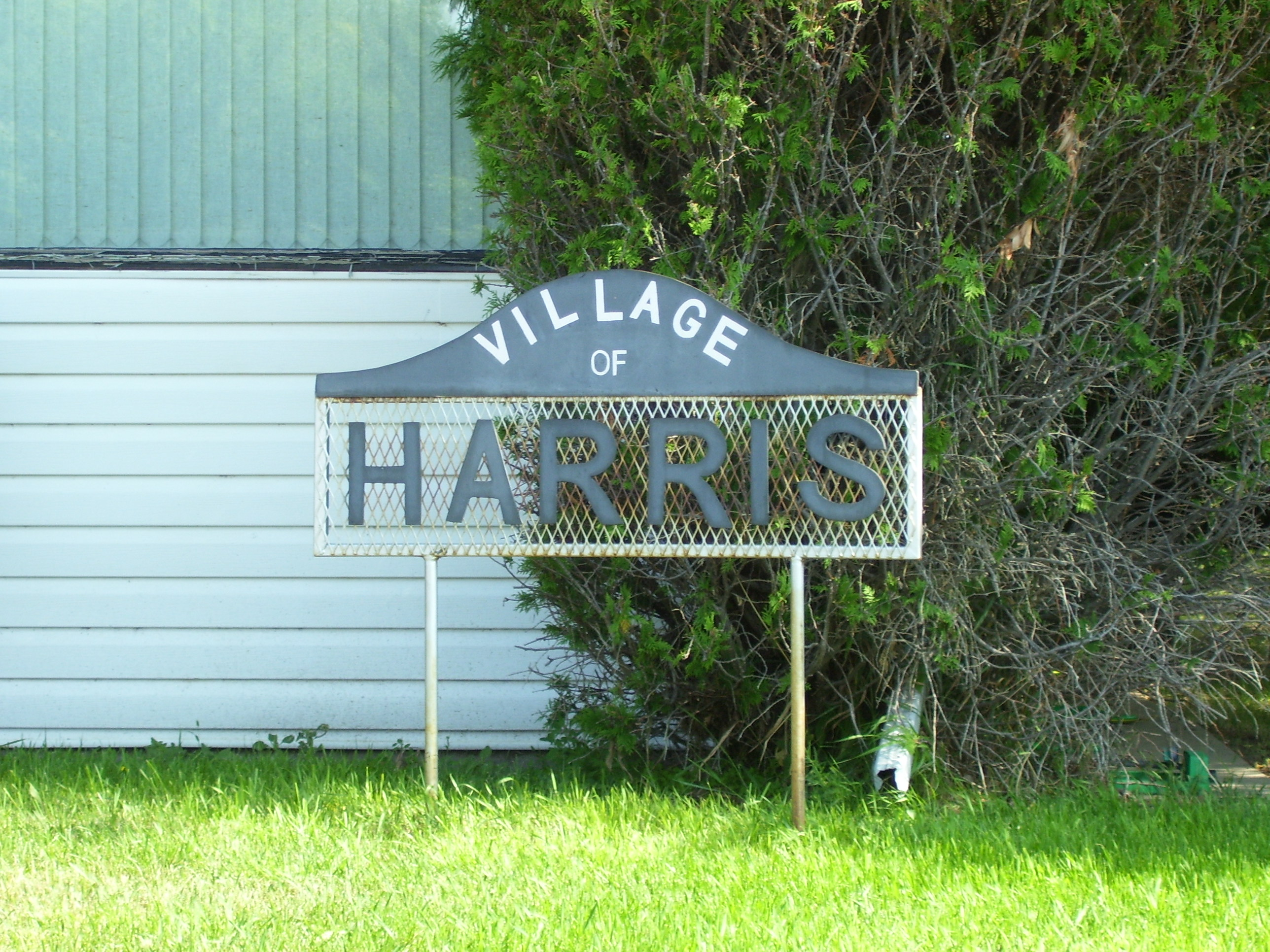

- Location of Harris Harris (Canada)
- Coordinates: 51°43′59″N 107°34′49″W
- Country: Canada
- Province: Saskatchewan
- Region: Central
- Census division: 12
- Rural municipality: Harris No. 316
- Post office founded: 1906 (at an outlying location); 1909 (at the village's current site)
- Incorporated (village): August 10, 1909

Government
  - Type: Municipal
  - Governing body: Harris Village Council
  - Mayor: Ron Genest
  - Administrator: Rhonda Leonard

Area
  - Total: 0.72 km^{2} (0.28 sq mi)

Population (2016)
  - Total: 193
  - Density: 259.5/km^{2} (672/sq mi)
- Time zone: UTC-6 (CST)
- Postal code: S0L 1K0
- Area code: 306
- Highways: Highway 7 Highway 768
- Railways: Canadian National Railway
- Website: Village of Harris

Harris (2016 population: 193) is a village in the Canadian province of Saskatchewan within the Rural Municipality of Harris No. 316 and Census Division No. 12. It was the site of the Great Ruby Hoax in 1914. Harris was named for Richard Elford Harris, an early settler to the area.

== History ==
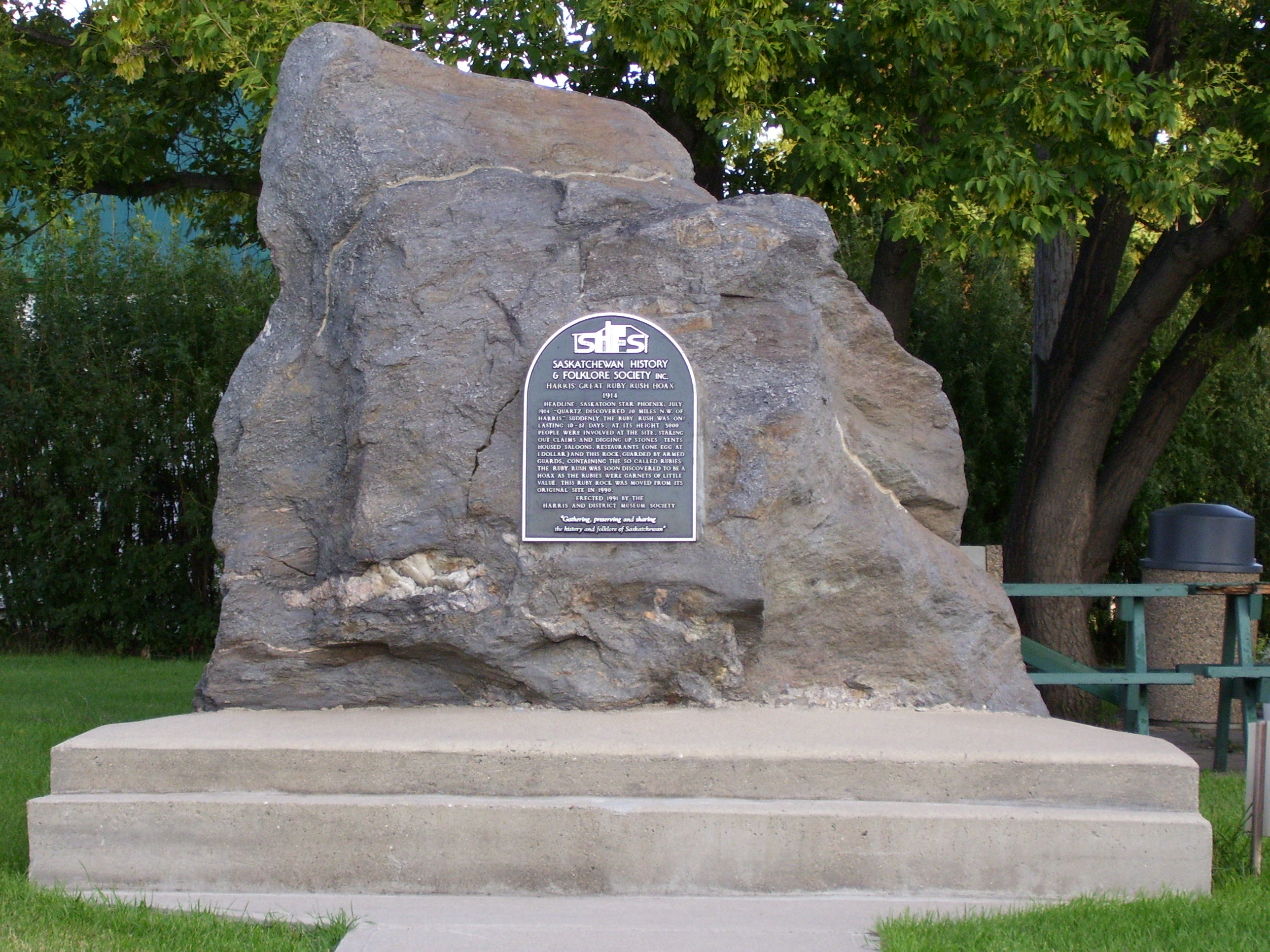
"Harris' Great Ruby Rush Hoax" Rock

Prior to the arrival of European settlers, First Nations people, most likely Plains Cree, inhabited the land around Harris. Evidence of this occupation is still evident in the Bear Hills north of Harris where a turtle effigy, vision quest sites, a cluster of nine stone rings and rock cairns dot the landscape.

The modern history of Harris begins in the early 20th century. The town of Harris was named after Richard Elford Harris, an Ontario-born carriage maker and carpenter, who moved west with his two sons and a daughter in 1904. The Harris family travelled from Saskatoon on the Old Bone Trail before striking out for land on what was later known as Crystal Beach. The Harris sod house became known as the "Harris Stopping Place" for settlers moving into the area and served as a rest place for travellers to rest themselves and their animals as well as get a hot meal before the Harris men escorted them to their homesteads. The flood of people lead to the establishment of a store, a Methodist church and a post office with Mr. Harris serving as the first postmaster.

As the Goose Lake Rail Line, the name given the Canadian Northern Railway line connecting Calgary with Saskatoon, approached the community, it was soon realized that the surveyors had made plans to lay the line two miles away. The townsfolk purchased land along the new rail line from a local homesteader and moved the entire community to its current location on mile-52 of the Goose Lake Line. The move necessitated a new name for the community. Several names were considered but when permission was granted to Richard Harris to move his post office to the new site, the Harris name went with it and so was born; Harris, Saskatchewan. In the fall of 1908, the first train rolled through the community. Harris incorporated as a village on August 10, 1909.

As the 20th century rolled on, the community witnessed many changes. Many businesses opened and closed over the years, leaving behind many important examples of early 20th century architecture in the community. In 1916 the first telephone company was established in town and on its heels, cement sidewalks were poured in the 1920s and a decade later, in 1930, power came to Harris. In 1955 Sask Power established a natural gas utility with a gravity sewer system following in 1960. The 1970s saw the village undertake a large street paving effort that was completed by 1980 and in 1976 the municipal water treatment plant and distribution system was established. Today, the village of Harris has nearly 200 residents and many businesses.

== Historic buildings ==
There are several buildings designated as Municipal Heritage Properties in Harris, these include:

- St. Brigitte Roman Catholic Church is a one-storey, wood-frame church with steeple, completed in 1909.
- Rural Municipality of Harris #316 Office is the oldest remaining office building in the Village of Harris
- Harris United Church is a one-storey, wood-frame church with corner bell tower, which was completed in 1924.
- Royal Bank of Canada is a one-storey, red-brick bank building that was constructed in 1922.
- Old Harris Canadian National Railway Water Tower is an octagonal-shaped wooden water tower that was constructed in 1934.

== The Great Ruby Rush ==
The Great Ruby Rush was a bizarre episodes in Saskatchewan history. On a hot, dry day in the summer of 1914, while working on a road gang in the Bear Hills about 20 miles northwest of Harris, Alex McCarthy, an American miner, new to town, spotted some red nuggets in a big black rock. He suspected that they might be rubies. He stashed the stones in a cigar box and headed for the Commercial Hotel in Harris. Over a glass of beer, McCarthy showed the rubies to the Gordon Brothers, proprietors of the hotel, who were known to have some mining experience.

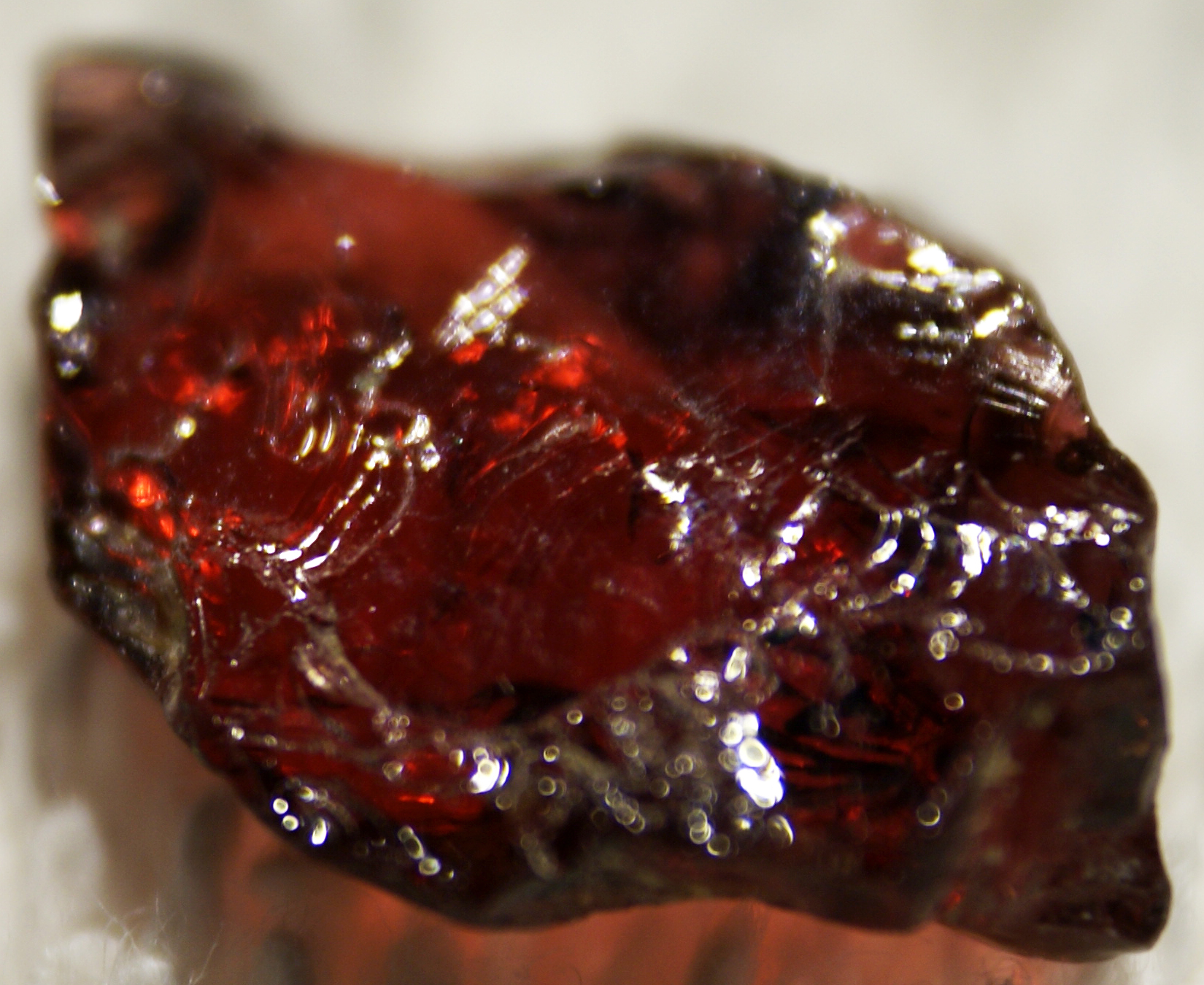
Garnet, the cause of the Great Ruby Rush

The Gordons quickly made their way to Saskatoon to stake their claim. While there, word got out about the ruby discovery. Headlines in the Saskatoon Star newspaper proclaimed a ruby and gold discovery near Harris. Word spread fast and within days, thousands of prospectors arrived in Harris seeking their fortune. The Gordon brothers took full advantage of the Ruby Rush. "Rubies" from the site of the discovery — a large black stone from the Bear Hills — were put on display at the hotel. The entrepreneurial Gordons supplied the miners with everything they could need, including lumber, food, alcohol and prostitutes in a saloon, a restaurant, and other entertainment in three large tents that they established on the site. Drunkenness was rampant, to the point that one man was found dead from alcohol poisoning. Less than two weeks later, word came from Saskatoon that the rubies were not really rubies at all but worthless garnets and just as soon as it had started, the Ruby Rush was dead.

Rumours persisted for years that the entire was a hoax created by the Gordon Brothers, as a money making scheme. For years afterwards, the Ruby Rush was a taboo subject in town, due in no small part to the main players and their families still lived in town. Today, the town is not so shy about its connection to the Great Ruby rush. The original "ruby" bearing rock is displayed prominently in town outside of the museum. For years, every July, the town celebrated the annual Ruby Rush Days. The hotel in town is named The Harris Hotel Ruby Rock Pub & Grill.

The plaque, erected by the Saskatchewan History & Folklore Society and mounted on the large rock next to the Harris Museum reads in part:

Headline. Saskatoon Star Phoenix: July 1914 "Quartz Discovered 20 Miles N.W. of Harris" Suddenly the ruby rush was on! Lasting 10–12 days, at its height 3000 people were involved at the site, staking out claims and digging up stones. Tents housed saloons, restaurants (one egg at 1 dollar), and this rock, guarded by armed guards, containing the so-called rubies. The ruby rush was soon discovered to be a hoax as the rubies were garnets of little value. This ruby rock was moved from its original site in 1990.

— Harris' Great Ruby Rush Hoax - Saskatchewan Historical Markers

== Demographics ==
Population history (1981–2016)
Year	Pop.	±%
1981	259	—
1986	277	+6.9%
1991	214	−22.7%
1996	245	+14.5%
2001	232	−5.3%
2006	187	−19.4%
2011	213	+13.9%
2016	193	−9.4%
Source: Statistics Canada via Saskatchewan Bureau of Statistics

In the 2021 Census of Population conducted by Statistics Canada, Harris had a population of 190 living in 95 of its 117 total private dwellings, a change of −1.6% from its 2016 population of 193. With a land area of 0.89 km^{2} (0.34 sq mi), it had a population density of 213.5/km^{2} (552.9/sq mi) in 2021.

In the 2016 Census of Population, the Village of Harris recorded a population of 193 living in 96 of its 120 total private dwellings, a −10.4% change from its 2011 population of 213. With a land area of 0.72 km^{2} (0.28 sq mi), it had a population density of 268.1/km^{2} (694.3/sq mi) in 2016.

== Climate ==
Climate data for Harris
Month	Jan	Feb	Mar	Apr	May	Jun	Jul	Aug	Sep	Oct	Nov	Dec	Year
Record high °C (°F)	10.0 (50.0)	13.3 (55.9)	21.0 (69.8)	33.9 (93.0)	37.2 (99.0)	41.5 (106.7)	40.6 (105.1)	38.0 (100.4)	37.0 (98.6)	31.1 (88.0)	22.0 (71.6)	16.1 (61.0)	41.5 (106.7)
Mean daily maximum °C (°F)	−10.6 (12.9)	−6.2 (20.8)	1.0 (33.8)	11.7 (53.1)	19.0 (66.2)	23.2 (73.8)	25.4 (77.7)	25.0 (77.0)	19.0 (66.2)	11.6 (52.9)	−0.6 (30.9)	−8.1 (17.4)	9.3 (48.7)
Daily mean °C (°F)	−15.9 (3.4)	−11.7 (10.9)	−4.8 (23.4)	4.8 (40.6)	11.6 (52.9)	16.1 (61.0)	18.3 (64.9)	17.4 (63.3)	11.7 (53.1)	4.8 (40.6)	−5.9 (21.4)	−13.4 (7.9)	2.7 (36.9)
Mean daily minimum °C (°F)	−21.3 (−6.3)	−17.2 (1.0)	−10.5 (13.1)	−2.2 (28.0)	4.1 (39.4)	9.0 (48.2)	11.0 (51.8)	9.8 (49.6)	4.3 (39.7)	−2.1 (28.2)	−11.2 (11.8)	−18.7 (−1.7)	−3.8 (25.2)
Record low °C (°F)	−45.6 (−50.1)	−43.9 (−47.0)	−37.2 (−35.0)	−27.2 (−17.0)	−17.2 (1.0)	−3.3 (26.1)	1.1 (34.0)	−3.3 (26.1)	−13.9 (7.0)	−25.0 (−13.0)	−34.0 (−29.2)	−42.5 (−44.5)	−45.6 (−50.1)
Average precipitation mm (inches)	22.3 (0.88)	11.9 (0.47)	19.3 (0.76)	28.6 (1.13)	48.1 (1.89)	70.0 (2.76)	64.3 (2.53)	43.4 (1.71)	31.3 (1.23)	18.3 (0.72)	19.4 (0.76)	23.3 (0.92)	400.1 (15.75)
Source: Environment Canada

== Notable people ==
- Quintin Laing, professional ice hockey player in the National Hockey League

== Gallery ==
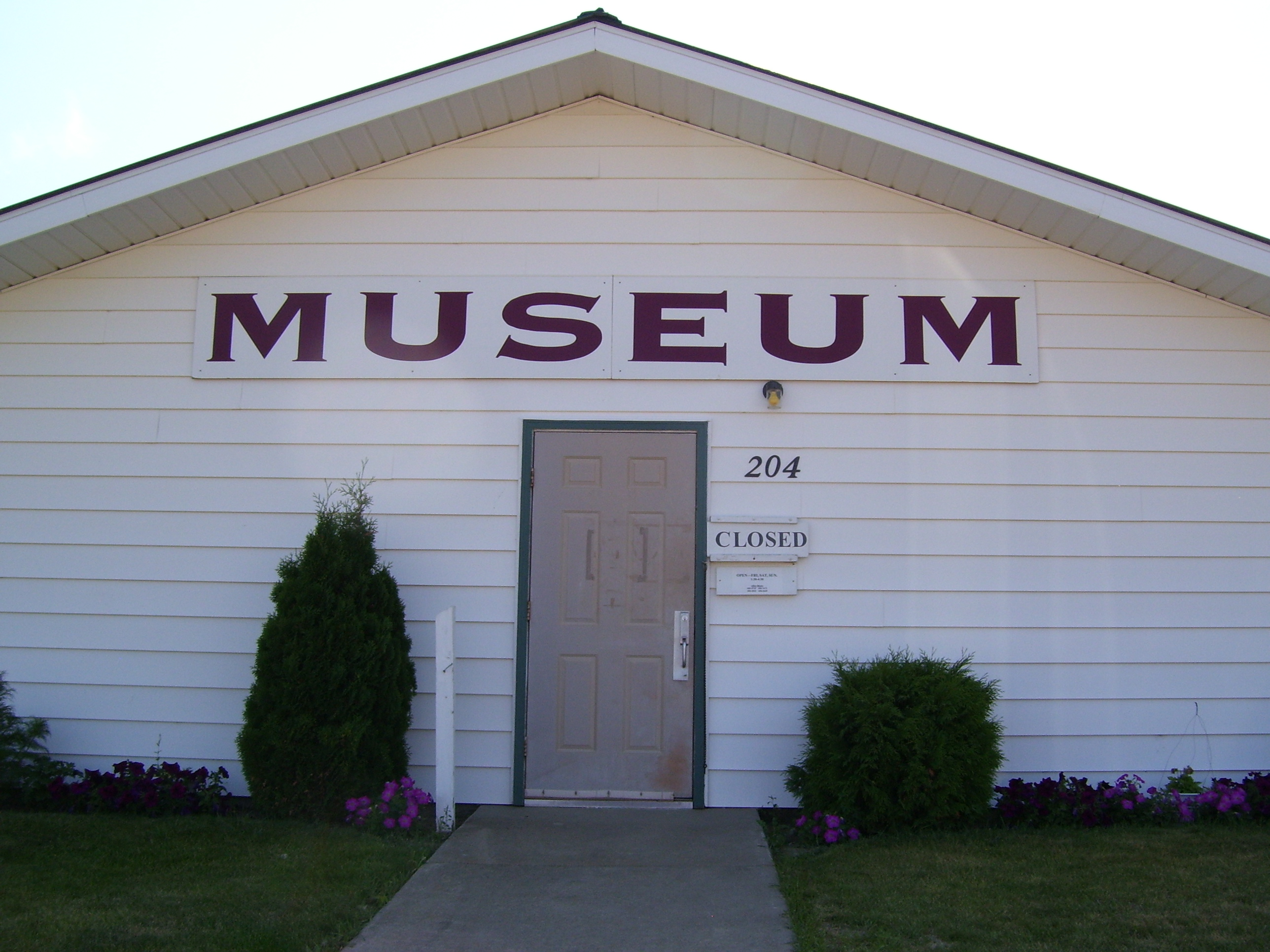
The Harris Museum

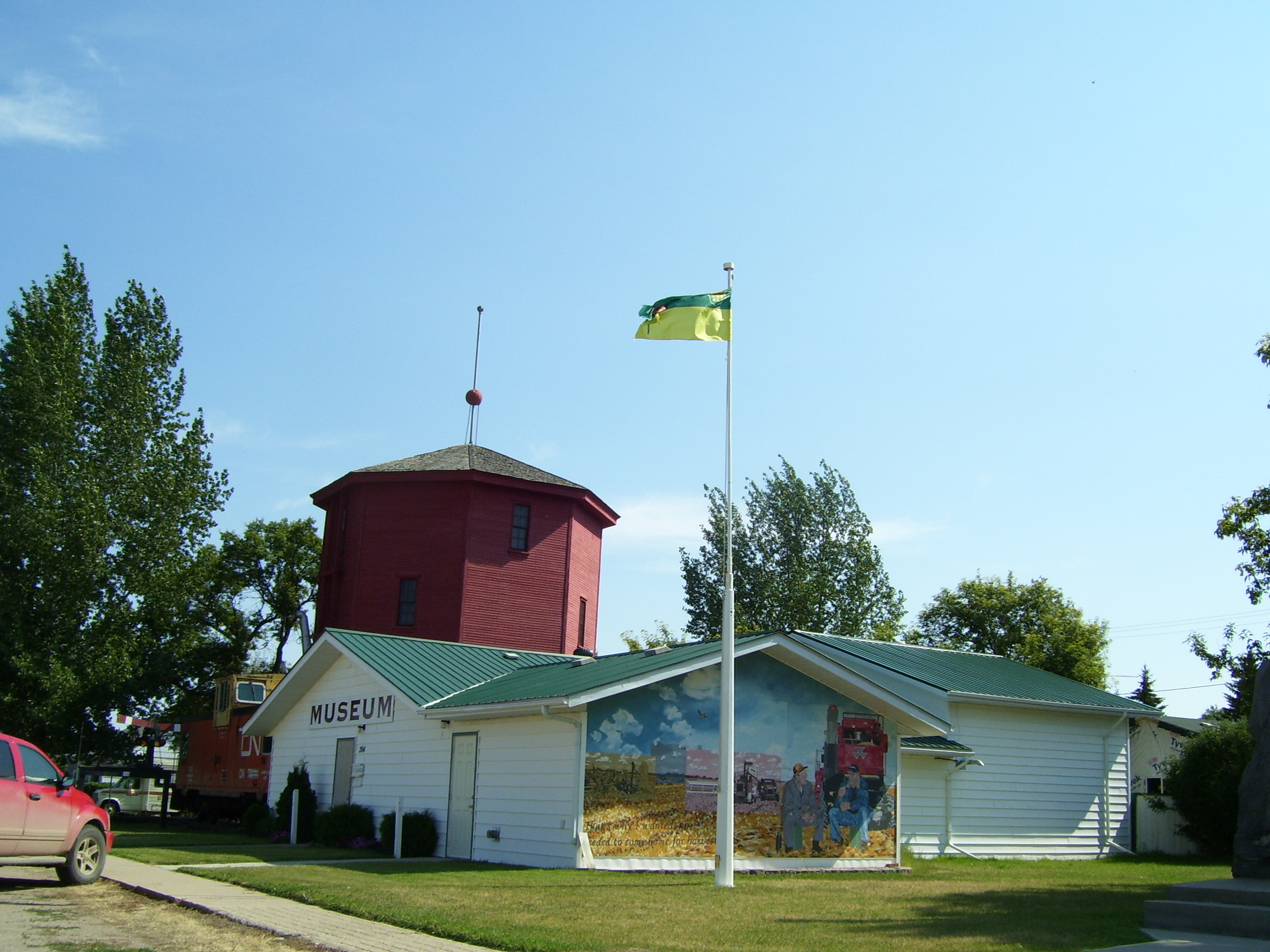

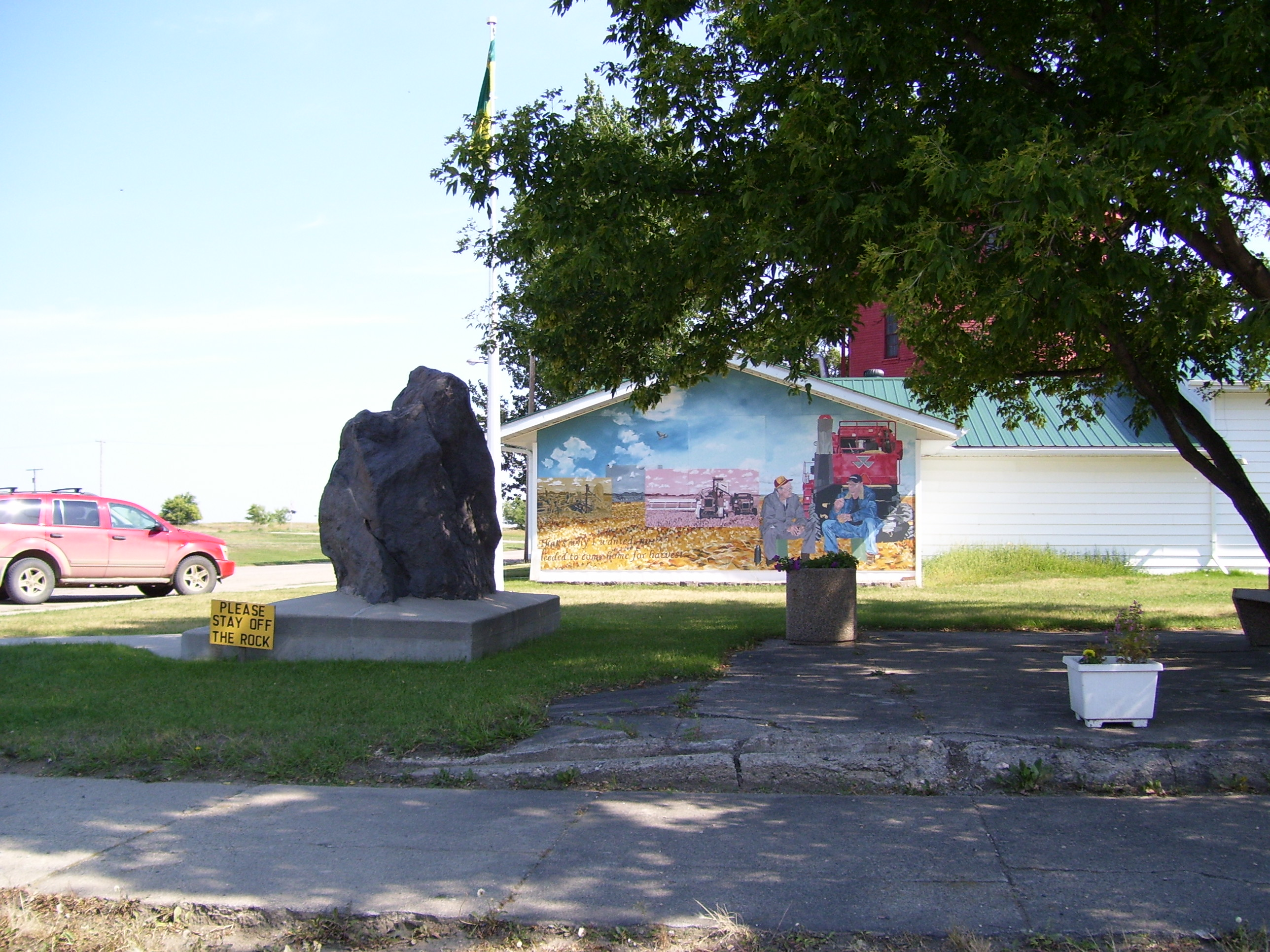

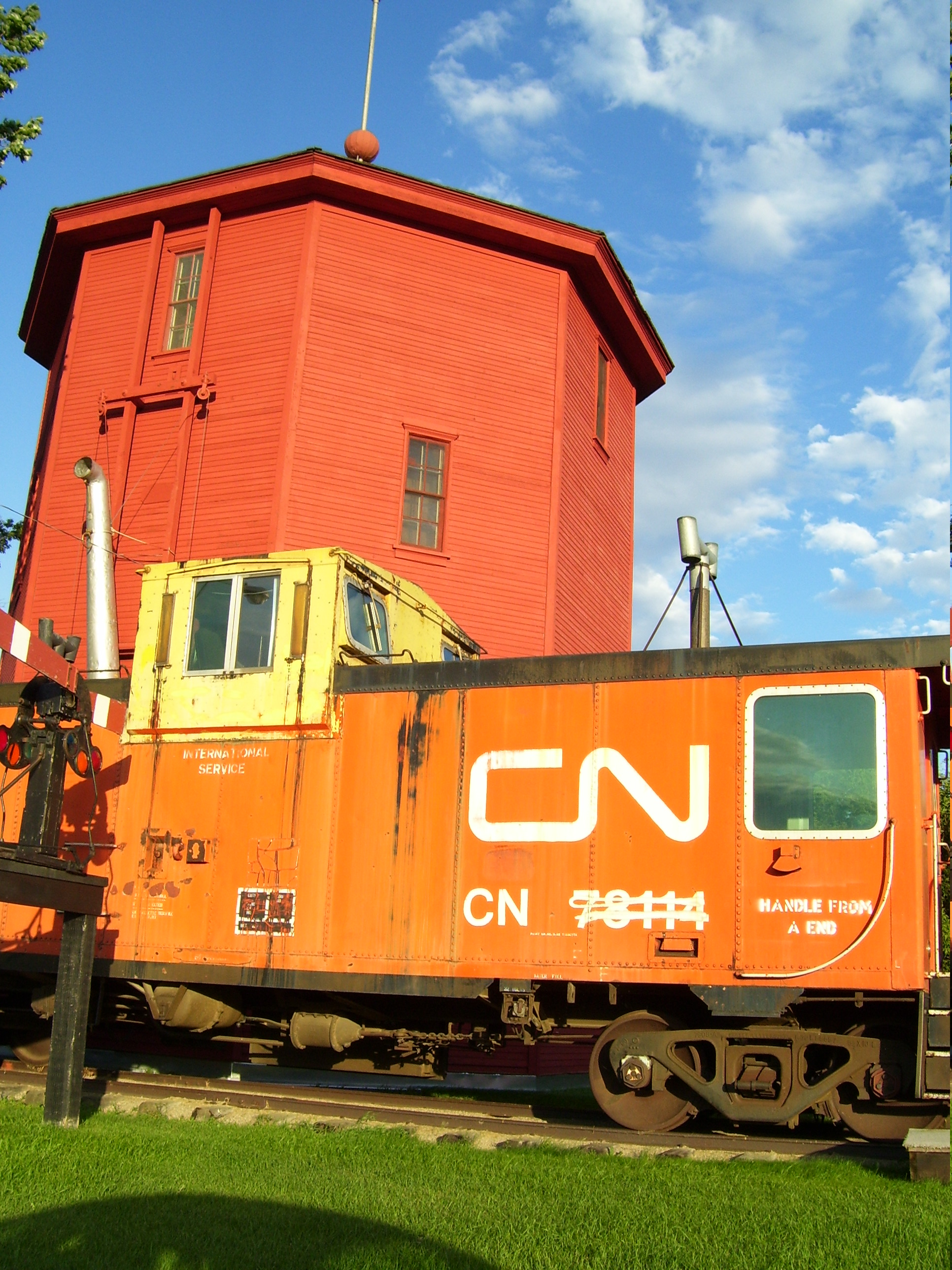
Locomotive and historic water tower

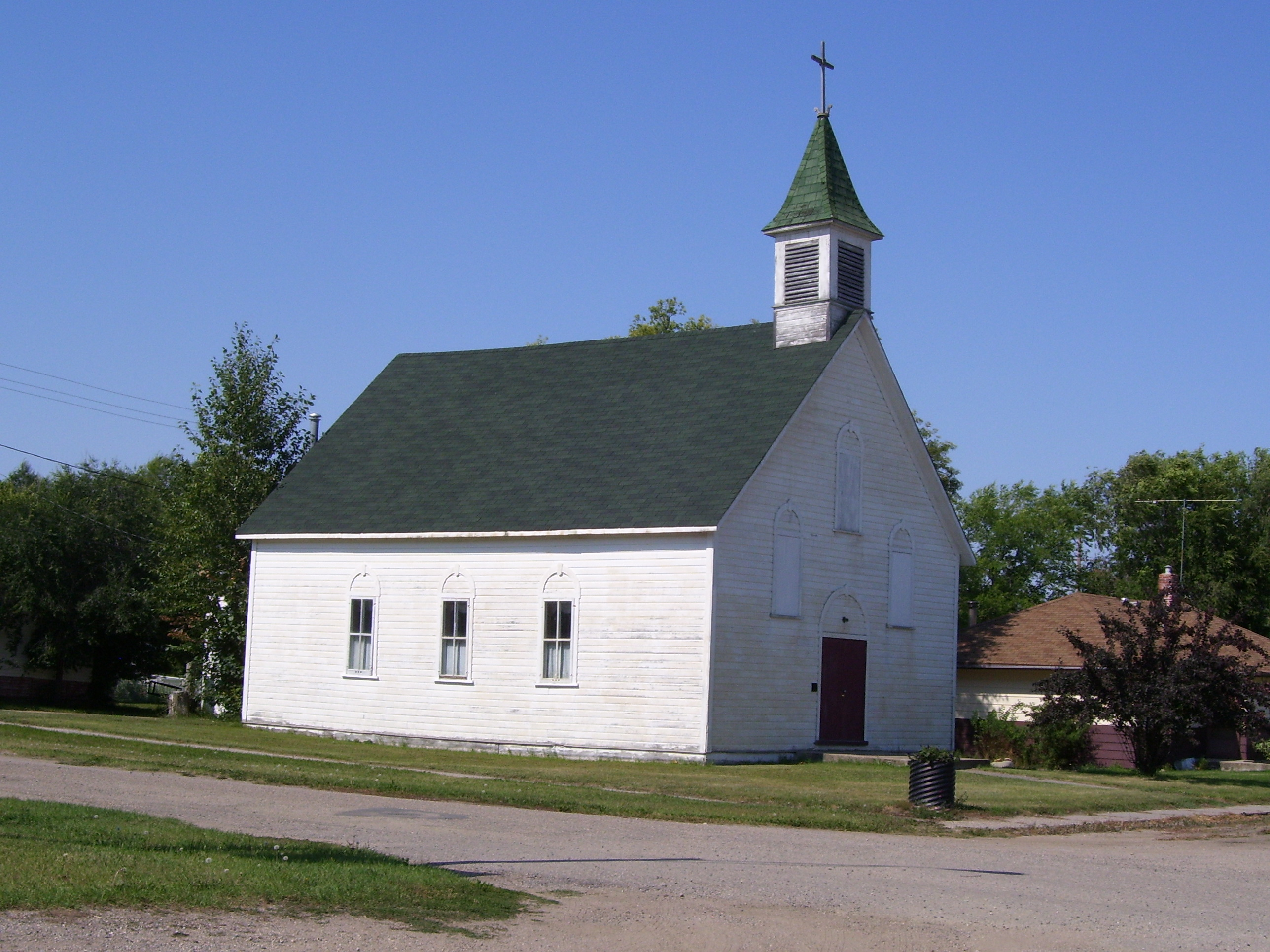
Church

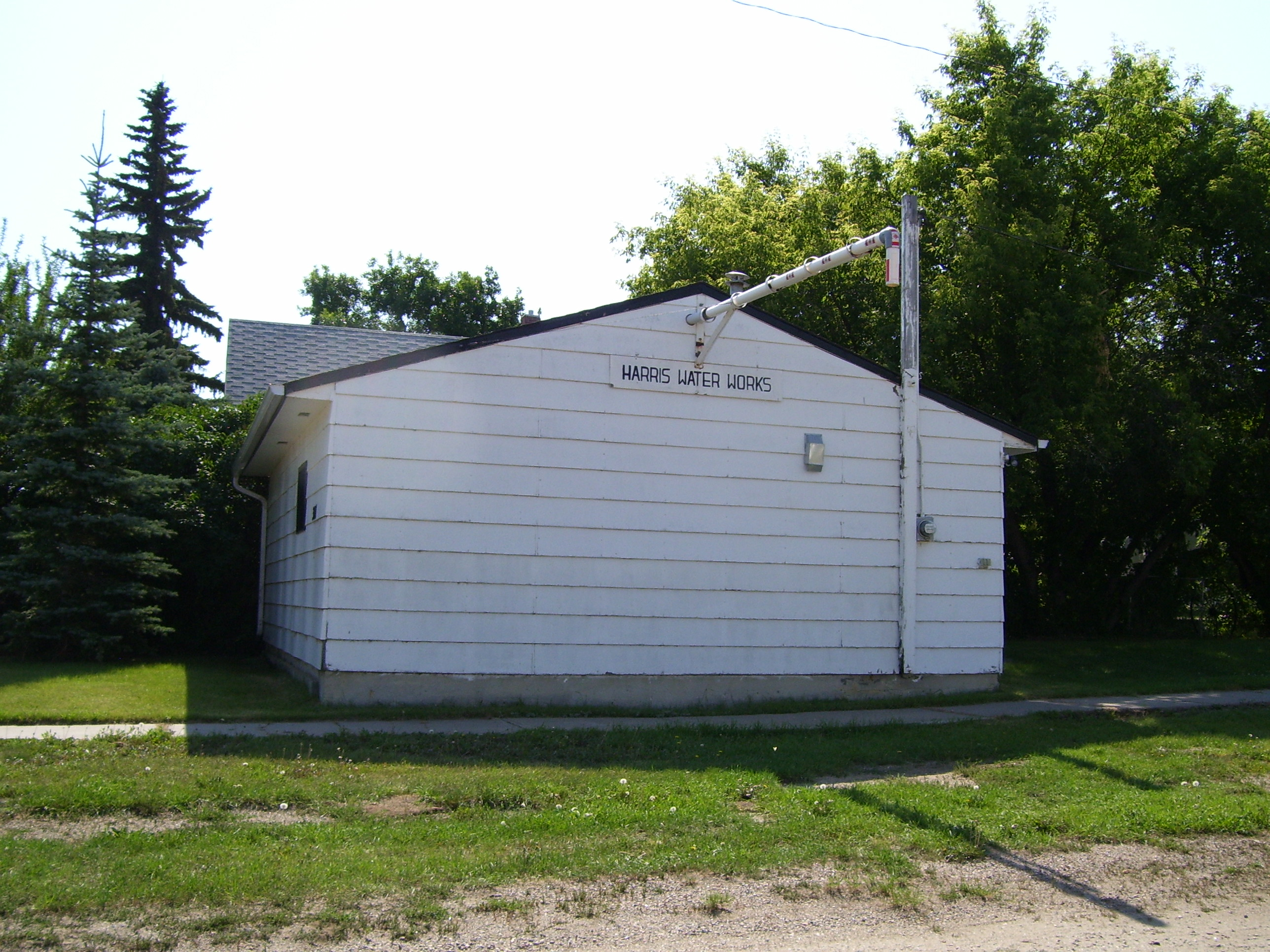
Water Works

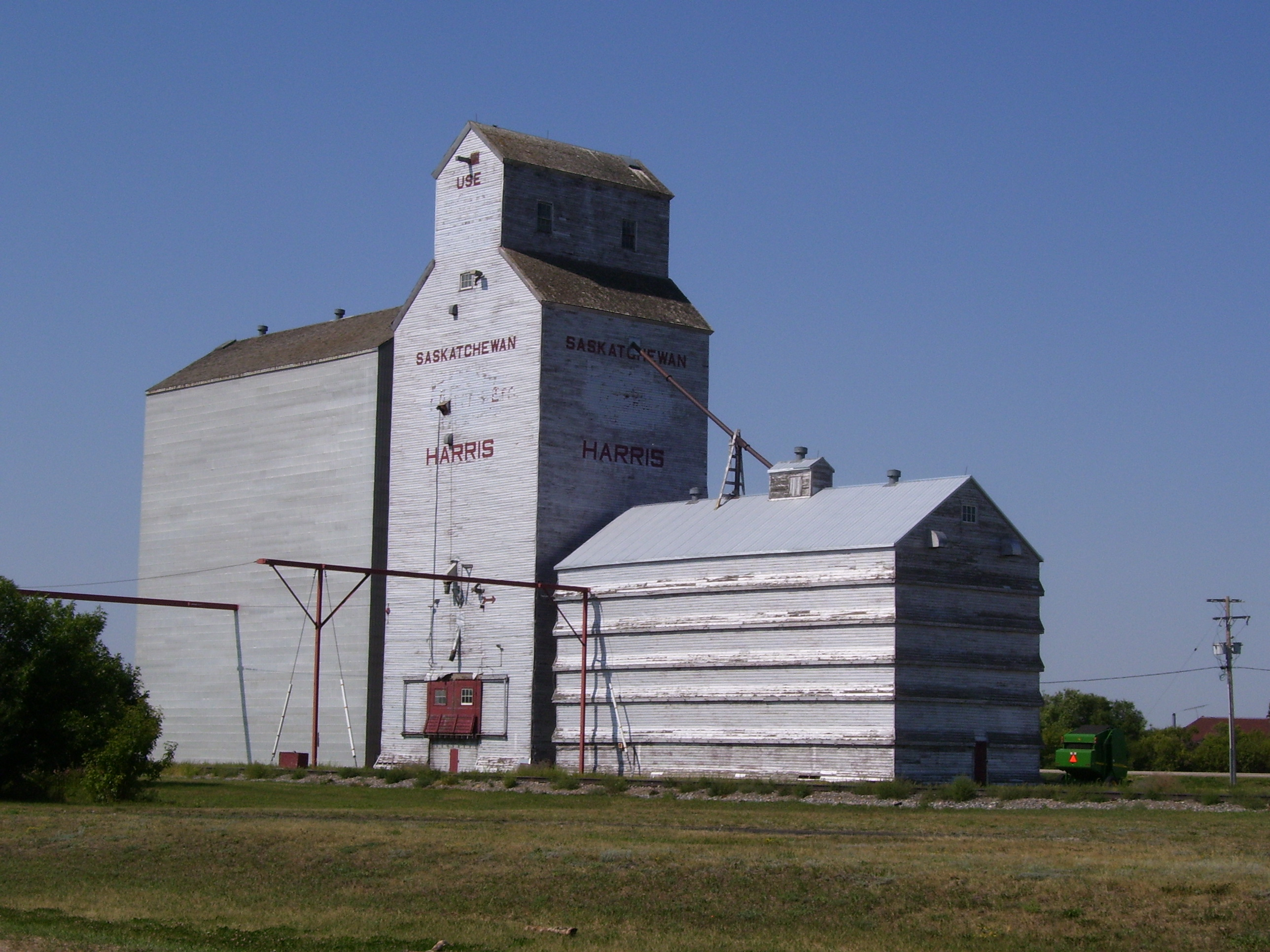
Grain elevator

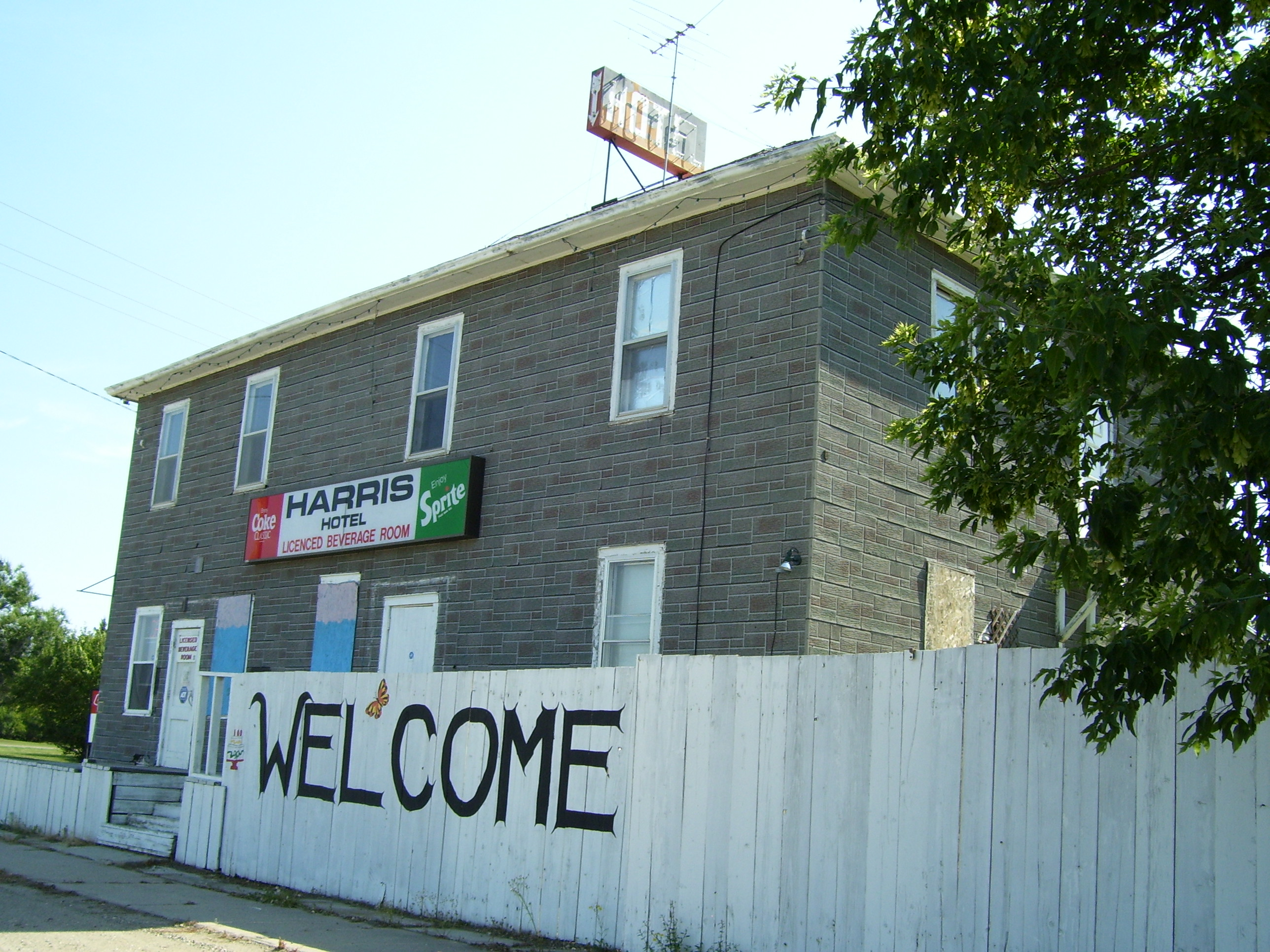
Hotel

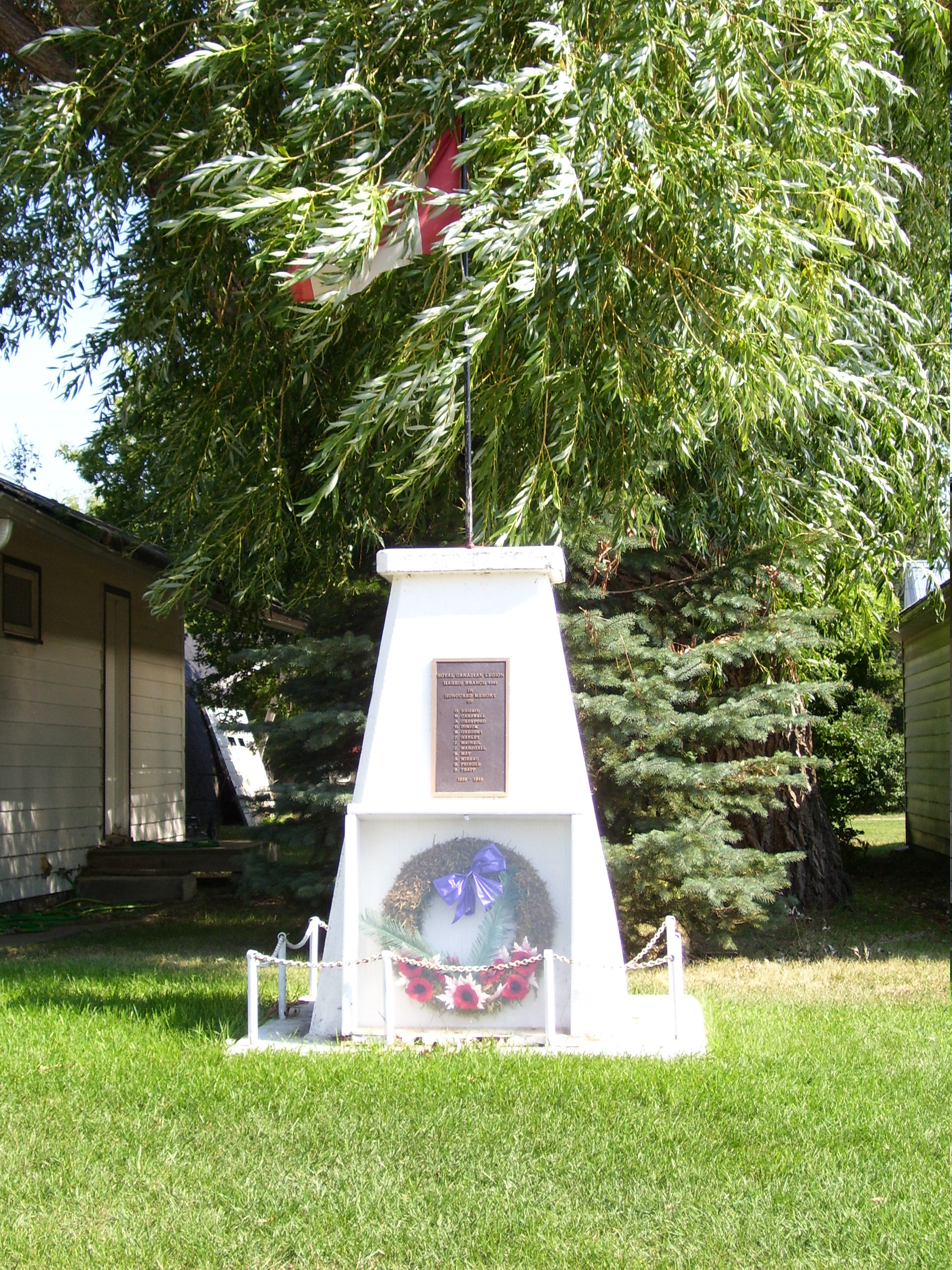
World War II Memorial

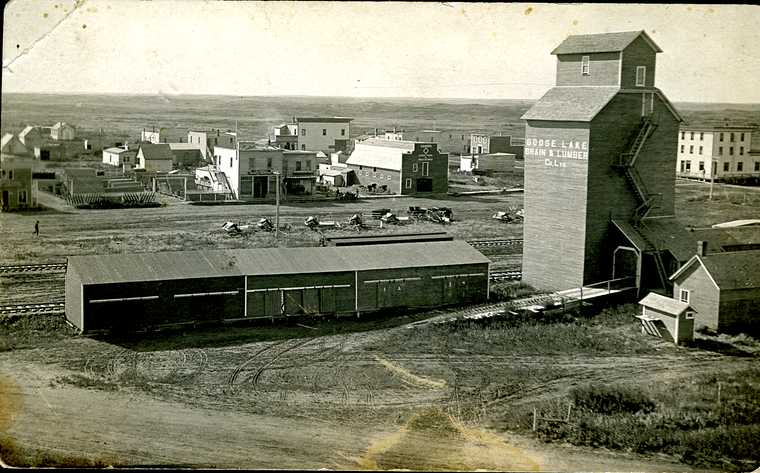
A postcard of the Harris Elevator from the early 1900s

== See also ==
- List of communities in Saskatchewan
- List of villages in Saskatchewan
