= Thomas Joseph McCarthy =

Canadian clergyman and bishop

- Bishop of Saint Catharines
- Church: Catholic Church
- Diocese: Diocese of Saint Catharines
- In office: 9 November 1958 – 7 July 1978
- Predecessor: Diocese erected
- Successor: Thomas Benjamin Fulton
- Previous post: Bishop of Nelson (1955-1958)

Orders
- Ordination: 25 May 1929
- Consecration: 1 August 1955 by Giovanni Panico

Personal details
- Born: 4 October 1905 Goderich, Ontario, Dominion of Canada, British Empire
- Died: 15 November 1986 (aged 81)

Thomas Joseph McCarthy (born 4 October 1905 in Goderich, Ontario; died 15 November 1986) was a Canadian clergyman and bishop for the Roman Catholic Diocese of Nelson, and later for Roman Catholic Diocese of Saint Catharines. He became ordained in 1929 and was appointed bishop in 1955. He died in 1986.
