= St. Brigitte Roman Catholic Church =

Church building in Saskatchewan, Canada

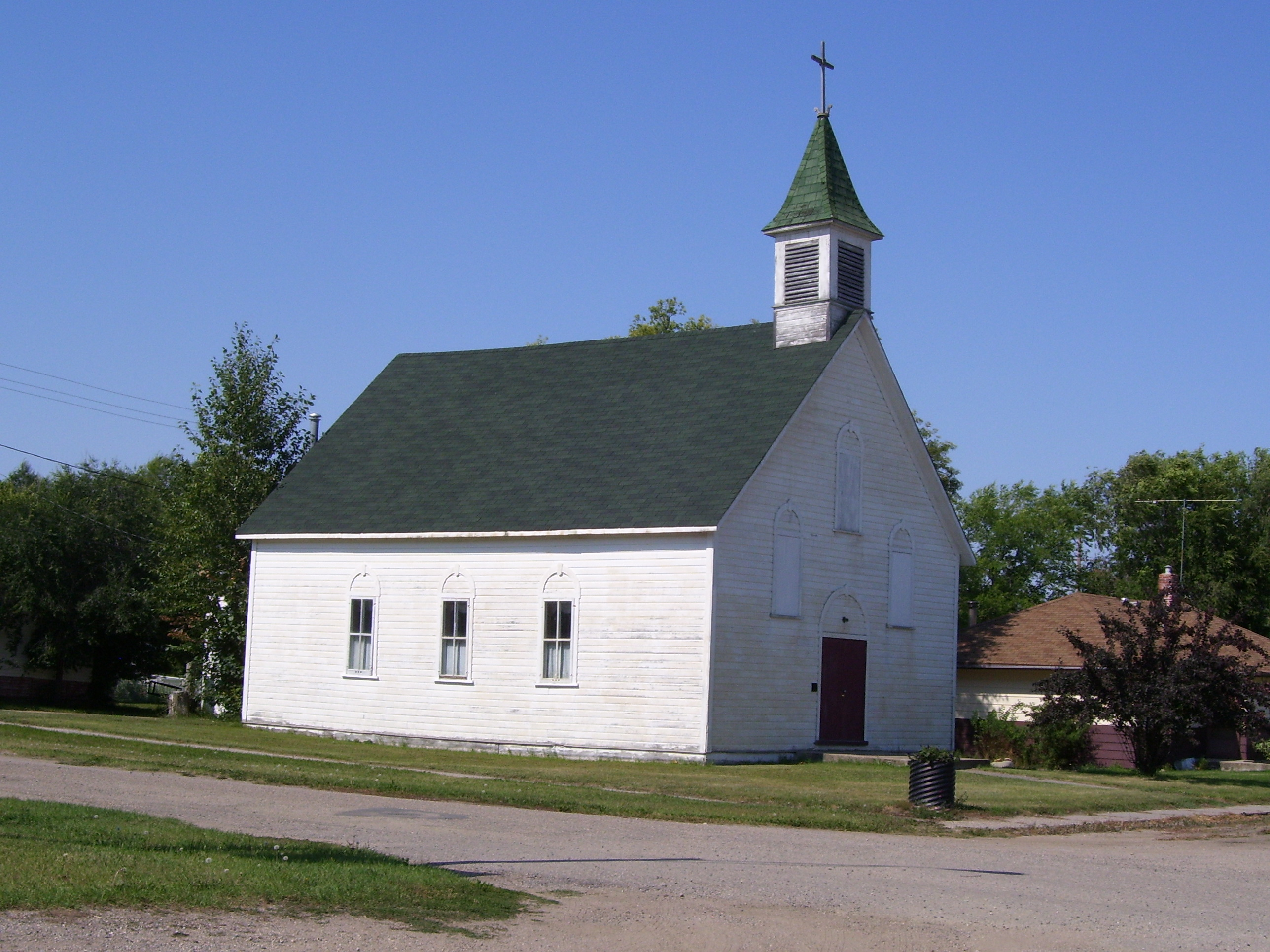

Religion
- Affiliation: Roman Catholic
- Province: Saskatchewan

Location
- Location: 215 Main Street (Canada) Harris, Saskatchewan
- Interactive map of St. Brigitte Roman Catholic Church
- Coordinates: 51.73326°N 107.58188°W

Architecture
- Type: Church
- Style: vernacular
- Completed: 1909

St. Brigitte Roman Catholic Church is a designated a historical building originally built as a Roman Catholic church in Harris, Saskatchewan, Canada. By 1907, due to the need of the local community the Diocese of St. Boniface, Manitoba created "Our Lady of Good Council" parish and sent a full-time priest to the area, necessitating the construction of the church. The wood church constructed in 1909, served as the Roman Catholic church in the community until 1996.
