= Connaught Square (Thunder Bay) =

Municipal park in Thunder Bay, Ontario

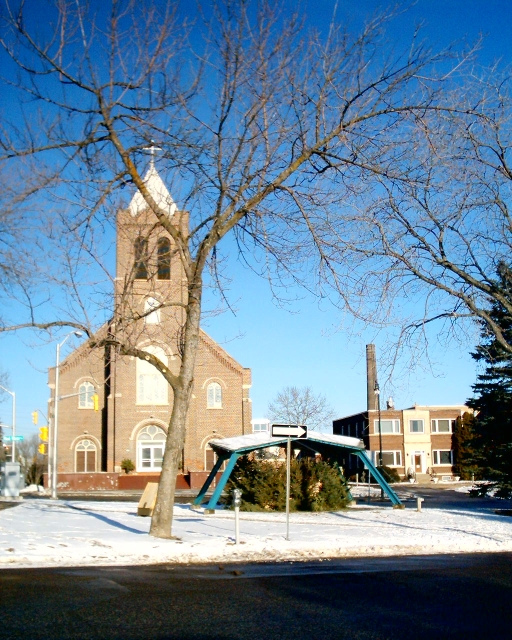
- Connaught Square and Centennial Shelter, with St. Andrew's Roman Catholic Church in the background.
- Interactive map of Connaught Square
- Location: Thunder Bay, Ontario, Canada
- Coordinates: 48°26′12″N 89°13′27″W
- Area: 1,000 m^{2} (11,000 sq ft)
- Operator: City of Thunder Bay, Parks Division
- Public transit: Thunder Bay Transit; 3C 3J 3M 9 11 13

Connaught Square is a public park located in the north end of Thunder Bay, Ontario, Canada. It is located directly east of Waverley Park across Algoma Street, formed by the conflux of Waverly Street and Red River Road. The square was originally named Gore Park, then renamed in 1936 for Prince Arthur, Duke of Connaught, after whom the former city of Port Arthur (originally Prince Arthur's Landing) was named. It covers a quarter of an acre, or 1,000 square metres. Contrary to its name is actually triangular.

A cairn, built in 1925, at the eastern corner of the park describes its history, and behind it lies the Geodetic Survey of Canada's bench mark for Port Arthur. The bench mark states that it is located 677.7 feet (206.6 m) above mean sea level.

Located in the centre of Connaught Square is the Centennial Shelter, a project built to commemorate the 100th anniversary of Canada in 1967. During the Christmas season, the Knights of Columbus erect a nativity scene beneath the canopy, and a pine tree located just to the east is decorated with coloured lights.

== See also ==
- Waverley Park (Thunder Bay)
