= Diocese of Thunder Bay =

Catholic ecclesiastical territory

Diocese of Thunder Bay Dioecesis Sinus Tonitralis
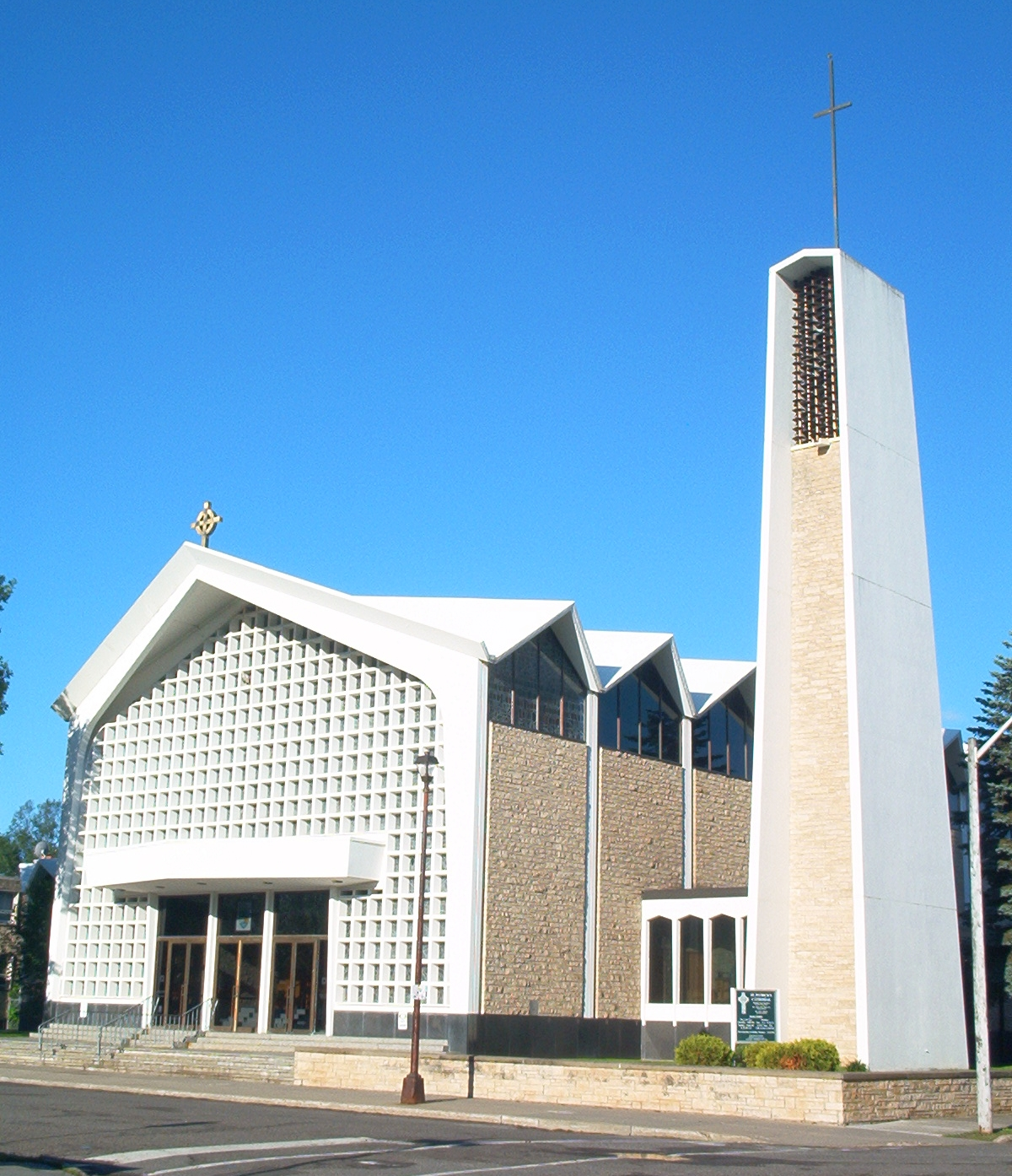
- St. Patrick's Cathedral in Thunder Bay

Location
- Country: Canada
- Territory: Northern Ontario
- Ecclesiastical province: Archdiocese of Toronto
- Metropolitan: Thunder Bay, Ontario
- Coordinates: 48°22′56″N 89°14′58″W

Statistics
- Population: Total; Catholics: (as of 2022); 290,142▲; 89,000 (est.)

Information
- Denomination: Roman Catholic
- Rite: Roman Rite
- Established: April 29, 1952
- Cathedral: St. Patrick's Cathedral
- Patron saint: St. Patrick
- Secular priests: 28▼31 Permanent Deacons▼

Current leadership
- Pope: Leo XIV
- Bishop: Alan Campeau
- Metropolitan Archbishop: Frank Leo
- Bishops emeritus: Frederick Joseph Colli

Website
- dotb.ca

The Roman Catholic Diocese of Thunder Bay (Latin: Dioecesis Sinus Tonitralis) is a Latin suffragan in the ecclesiastical province of the Metropolitan Archdiocese of Toronto, in Ontario, Canada.

Its cathedral episcopal see is St. Patrick's Cathedral, dedicated to St. Patrick, in Thunder Bay, Ontario.

== Statistics ==
As per 2014 it pastorally served 81,400 Catholics (31.0% of 262,600 total) on 220,000 km^{2} in 43 parishes with 46 priests (37 diocesan, 9 religious), 36 deacons and 16 lay religious (9 brothers, 7 sisters) .

== History ==
- It was erected 29 April 1952, as the Diocese of Fort William, on territories split off from the Metropolitan Archdiocese of Saint-Boniface and the Diocese of Sault Sainte Marie.
- Renamed on 26 February 1970 as Diocese of Thunder Bay, after its see.

== Episcopal ordinaries ==
(all Roman Rite)

Suffragan Bishops of Fort William

- Edward Quentin Jennings (born Canada) (1952.05.14 – 1969.09.18), previously Titular Bishop of Sala (1941.03.22 – 1946.02.22) as Auxiliary Bishop of Archdiocese of Vancouver (BC, Canada) (1941.03.22 – 1946.02.22), Bishop of Kamloops (Canada) (1946.02.22 – 1952.05.14); emeritate as Titular Bishop of Assidona (1969.09.18 – resigned 1970.11.23), died 1980.

Suffragan Bishops of Thunder Bay

- Norman Joseph Gallagher (1970.04.16 – death 1975.12.28); previously Titular Bishop of Adrasus (1963.06.25 – 1970.04.16), first as Auxiliary Bishop of the Military Vicariate of Canada (Canada) (1963.06.25 – 1966), then as Auxiliary Bishop of Archdiocese of Montréal (Quebec, Canada) (1966 – 1970.04.16)
- John Aloysius O'Mara (1976.05.24 – 1994.02.02), next Bishop of Saint Catharines (Canada) (1994.02.02 – retired 2001.11.09)
- Frederick Bernard Henry (1995.03.24 – 1998.01.19); previously Titular Bishop of Carinola (1986.04.18 – 1995.03.24) as Auxiliary Bishop of London (Ontario, Canada) (1986.04.18 – 1995.03.24); later Bishop of Calgary (BC, Canada) (1998.01.19 – retired 2017.01.04)
- Frederick Joseph Colli (2 February 1999 - 17 June 2024), previously Titular Bishop of Afufenia (1994.12.19 – 1999.02.02) as Auxiliary Bishop of Ottawa (Ontario, Canada) (1994.12.19 – 1999.02.02).
- Alan Campeau (Appointed 10 January 2025)

== See also ==
- List of Catholic dioceses in Canada

== Sources and external links ==
- Diocese of Thunder Bay site
- GCatholic, with Google map & satellite photo
- "Diocese of Thunder Bay". Catholic-Hierarchy.
