= St. George's Anglican Church, St. Catharines =

Church in St. Catharines, Ontario, Canada

Coordinates: 43°09′41″N 79°14′47″W

A front view of St. George's Anglican Church

St. George's Anglican Church is an Anglican church in St. Catharines, Ontario and is the oldest church in the city. It is a part of the Anglican Diocese of Niagara and was first established in 1792 (234 years ago).

In 1836 (190 years ago), the original wooden structure was destroyed by a fire. The structure was replaced with a stone church and reopened in 1840 (186 years ago).

St. George's has multiple programs in support of persons facing food or housing insecurity. In 2026, St George's celebrated the thirty year anniversary of the Community Breakfast Program, serving hot meals every morning to anyone in need. In the winter of 2025, St George's partnered with the Region in order to provide space for 40 emergency overnight beds during cold weather alerts.
