= Diocese of Saint Catharines =

Catholic ecclesiastical territory

Coordinates: 43.1608°N 79.2467°W

Diocese of Saint Catharines Dioecesis Sanctae Catharinae
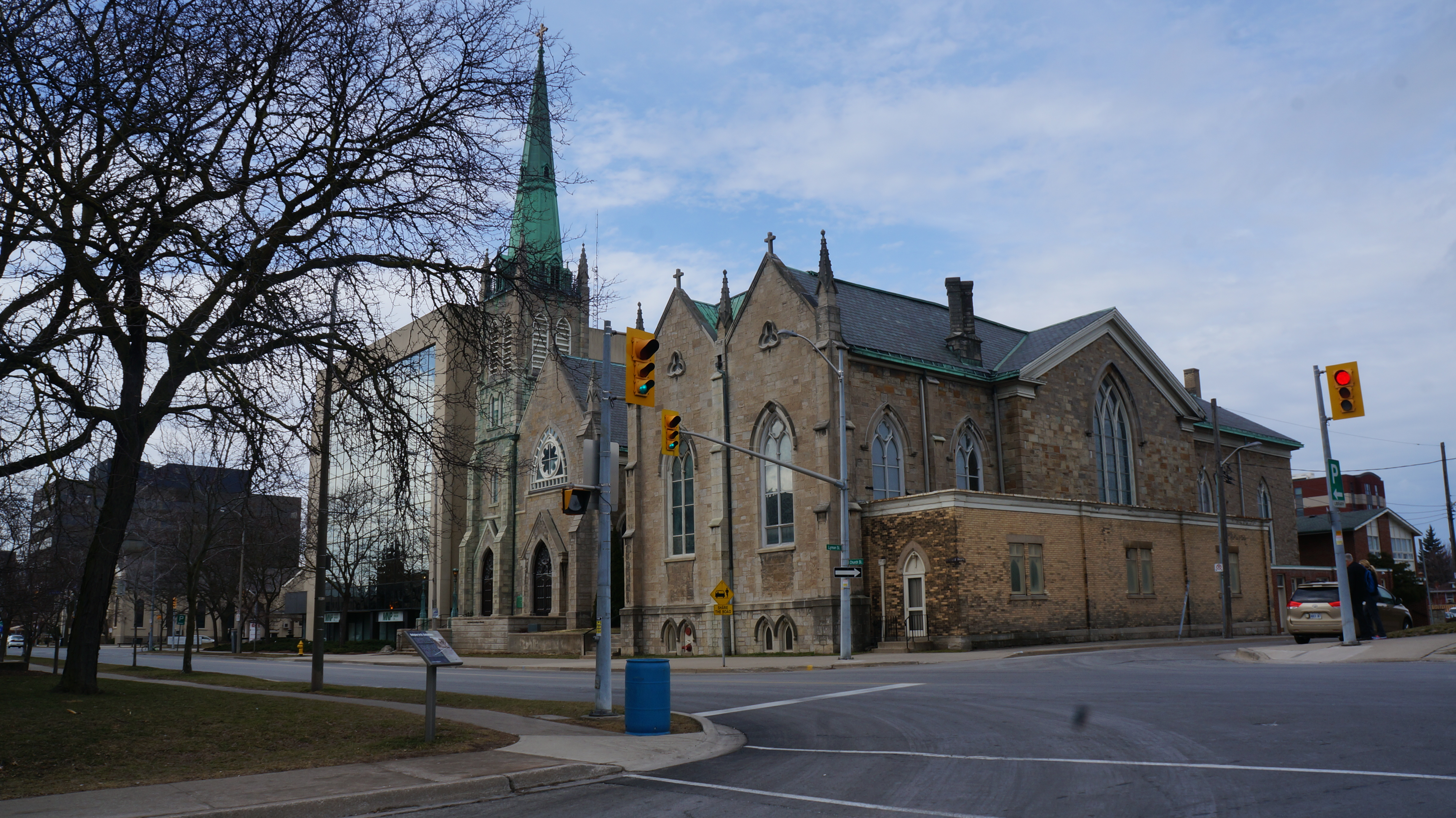
- Cathedral of St. Catherine of Alexandria

Location
- Country: Canada
- Ecclesiastical province: Toronto
- Population: 160,000 (34.6%)

Information
- Denomination: Roman Catholic
- Rite: Roman Rite
- Established: 22 November 1958
- Cathedral: Cathedral of St. Catherine of Alexandria, Saint Catharines
- Patron saint: Saint Catherine of Alexandria

Current leadership
- Pope: Leo XIV
- Bishop: Gerard Paul Bergie
- Metropolitan Archbishop: Francis Leo
- Bishops emeritus: James Matthew Wingle

Website
- saintcd.com

The Roman Catholic Diocese of Saint Catharines (Latin: Dioecesis Sanctae Catharinae in Ontario) (erected 22 November 1958) is a suffragan of the Archdiocese of Toronto in St. Catharines, Ontario. It covers the municipalities of Niagara Region and Haldimand County.

== Bishops ==
=== Ordinaries ===
- Thomas Joseph McCarthy (9 November 1958 Appointed - 7 July 1978 Resigned)
- Thomas Benjamin Fulton (7 July 1978 Appointed - 2 February 1994 Retired)
- John Aloysius O’Mara (2 February 1994 Appointed - 9 November 2001 Retired)
- James Matthew Wingle (9 November 2001 Appointed - 7 April 2010 Resigned)
- Gerard Paul Bergie (14 September 2010 Appointed - )

=== Other priests of this diocese who became bishops ===
- Frederick Joseph Colli, appointed Auxiliary Bishop of Ottawa, Ontario in 1994
- Richard John Grecco, appointed Auxiliary Bishop of London, Ontario in 1997
- Wayne Joseph Kirkpatrick, Installed as 10th Bishop of Antigonish, Nova Scotia February 3, 2020

== History ==
The Diocese of St. Catharines underwent considerable change and consolidation from 1982 to 1997, in terms of episcopal leadership, spiritual renewal, the first ever lay diocesan congress, and Catholic secondary schools. Bishop John A. O'Mara made the congress the primary diocesan instrument to prepare local Catholics for the Great Jubilee in the year 2000. Priests and people have also celebrated many notable anniversaries and undertaken a number of church renovations and expansions, the most impressive among them being the wholesale restoration of the cathedral.

The founding bishop of the diocese, Most Rev. Thomas J. McCarthy, died on November 15, 1986. He had been bishop for twenty years, from 1958 to 1978, during which time he guided the local church through the many reforms in liturgy and governance brought about by the implementation of Vatican II.

== Schools ==
Since 1982 Catholic secondary education in the diocese has experienced tremendous growth in the number of students and new schools. Added to the roster of high schools were St. Paul in Niagara Falls (1982); Holy Cross in St. Catharines, 1985; Lakeshore Catholic in Port Colborne (1988); St. Michael in Niagara Falls (1989); Monsignor Clancy in Thorold (1989); Blessed Trinity in Grimsby (1994); St. Francis and Ecole secondaire Jean Vanier (Saint-Jean Brebeuf) in St. Catharines (1995). Major renovations and expansion have been carried out at Lakeshore Catholic, St. Paul, Notre Dame, Denis Morris and Holy Cross.

- Niagara Catholic District School Board
- Brant Haldimand Norfolk Catholic District School Board
- Conseil scolaire catholique MonAvenir

== Restoration ==
The largest restoration project was the cathedral parish of St. Catherine of Alexandria. More than one million dollars was spent on the work, which included a new pipe organ, work on the foundation, and repairs to the bell tower. The diocese also renovated the former Church of the Resurrection on Merrittville Highway near Brock University for a diocesan pastoral centre. It houses the Chancery, the diocesan archives, the Marriage Tribunal, the Office of Religious Education, the diocesan newspaper and a pastoral/theological resource library.

== Present cathedral ==
The first Catholic church at St. Catharines was built to meet the spiritual needs of the Irish labourers who built the first Welland Canal which was opened in 1829. It was a wood structure on the same site as the present cathedral. On November 12, 1831, Bishop Alexander Macdonell of Kingston blessed and opened this church which was the first Roman Catholic Parish church to be built in the Niagara Peninsula. This first Catholic Church was burned down by an arsonist on August 23, 1842. Fortunately the second Welland Canal was being built between 1842–45 and thus there were once again many Irish labourers in the area. There was much sickness in the work camps and Dr. Constantine Lee, then Pastor at St. Catharines, contracted one of the diseases while ministering to the workers and died in the winter of 1842–43. Often there were delays in construction of the canal, so the Irish workers used their free time to build a new parish church. Father McDonagh laid the cornerstone on Ascension Day, May 25, 1843. The Irish Canal workers continued to build the church for the next two years — for which there is a commemorative stone in Latin, dated 1844, by the entrance to the church. Father McDonagh opened the new church, which was dedicated to St. Catherine of Alexandria on June 10, 1845. During the latter part of the nineteenth century many additions were made to the church to give it the structure it has now. In the post-Vatican II period its interior was updated somewhat to give the church the appearance that it has today. For almost a century the church was usually the seat of the Deanery of St. Catharines, the Dean residing at its Rectory. In 1945 it celebrated the centennial of the opening of the present church. On November 25, 1958, it became the Cathedral Church of the newly formed Diocese of St. Catharines.

== Crest ==
The first crest was designed when the new Diocese of St. Catharines was established in 1958. This crest consisted of the Bishop's mitre, and the broken Catherine Wheel superimposed upon the Welland Canal. This was replaced by a second crest in 1983, which hoped to incorporate still more of the theological, historical and geographical features of the Diocese. The components of the new crest are: The crest is divided into left and right halves from top to bottom by the Welland Canal — portrayed in the crest by six links going from right to left, back and forth three times. The crest is divided into a top and bottom half by two wavy lines, representing the two major rivers in the St. Catharines Diocese — the Grand River to the left and the Welland river to the right. The blue background represents the sky and the rest and peace that only Heaven can give.

It symbolizes the desire of the Diocese for peace with its neighbours in the United States of America, as well as within the local Niagara Peninsula community, an area of Canada which has had more than its share of battles over the centuries.

== Conclusion ==
In 1997, the Diocese of St. Catharines numbered about 150,000 Catholics, with about 50 parish and mission churches and served by some 100 priests. There were twenty religious communities of fathers, brothers, and sisters who ran a wide variety of educational, social, medical and charitable institutions within the Diocese. Catholic chaplains were also assigned to major religious and secular institutions. The Catholic community has contributed to all walks of life in the Niagara Peninsula over the years. In addition to their spiritual role, first as missionaries, then as chaplains and finally as parish priests, the clergy have taken a strong hand over the years in building up the institutional and spiritual life of the area with the help of religious communities. The laity over the years have served as explorers, traders, soldiers, farmers, canal builders, railroad workers and factory labourers. In addition to their spiritual and charitable contributions the laity have added immensely to the social, intellectual and cultural life of the Peninsula community.

== Churches ==
Name	Photo	Location	Notes
St. Helen Church		Beamsville	
St. Patrick Church		Caledonia	
St. Stephen Church		Cayuga	
Sacred Heart Church		Chippawa	
St. George Church		Crystal Beach	
St. Michael the Archangel Church		Dunnville	
St. Ann Church		Fenwick, Ontario	
St. Alexander Church		Fonthill	
St. Michael Church		Fort Erie	
St. Joseph Church		Grimsby	
Our Lady of Lourdes Church		Hagersville	
Église de Saint-Antonie-de-Padoue		Niagara Falls	
Monastery of Mount Carmel		Niagara Falls	
Our Lady of the Scapular Church		Niagara Falls	
Shrine of Our Lady of Peace		Niagara Falls	
St. Ann Church		Niagara Falls	
St. Patrick Roman Catholic Church		Niagara Falls	
St. Thomas More Church		Niagara Falls	
St. Vincent de Paul Church		Niagara-on-the-Lake	The parish was established in 1826 and the church was built in 1834. A nine side addition was added in 1964.
Église de Saint-Jean-de-Brébeuf		Port Colborne	
Shrine of the Our Lady of the Holy Rosary		Port Colborne	
St. John Bosco Church		Port Colborne	
St. Patrick Church		Port Colborne	
St. Therese of Lisieux Church		Port Colborne	
Star of the Sea Church		Port Dalhousie	
St. Martin of Tours Church		Smithville	
St. Joseph Church		Snyder	
Cathedral of St. Catherine of Alexandria		St. Catharines	
Église de l’Immaculée-Conception		St. Catharines	
Our Lady of Perpetual Help Church		St. Catharines	
St. Alfred Church		St. Catharines	
St. Denis Church		St. Catharines	
St. Julia Church		St. Catharines	
St. Mary of the Assumption		St. Catharines	
St. Patrick Church		St. Catharines	
St. Thomas Aquinas Church		St. Catharines	
Church of St Aloysius		Thorold	
Holy Rosary Church		Thorold	
St. Elizabeth Church		Wainfleet	
St. Ann Church		Walpole	
Eglise Sacré-Cœur		Welland	
Our Lady of Hungary Church		Welland	
St. Andrew the Apostle Church		Welland	
St. Anthony of Padova Church		Welland	
St. Kevin Church		Welland	
St. Mary Church		Welland	
Sts. Peter and Paul Church		Welland	
