= Église Sainte-Geneviève (Montreal) =

Coordinates: 45.480°N 73.8725°W

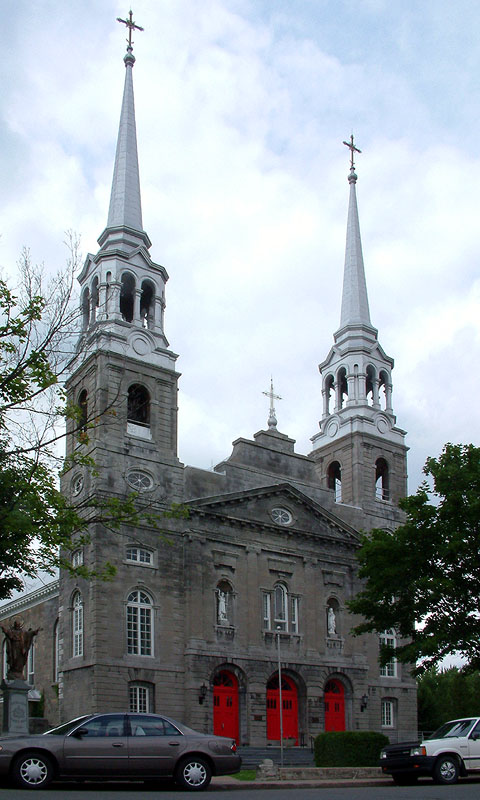

Religion
- Affiliation: Roman Catholic
- Province: Quebec
- Year consecrated: 1844
- Status: active

Location
- Country: Canada
- Interactive map of Église Sainte-Geneviève

Architecture
- Architect: Thomas Baillargé
- Type: Parish church
- Style: Baroque and Spanish revival

Specifications
- Direction of façade: SSE
- Length: 46 m
- Width: 20 m
- Height (max): 20 m
- Spire: Two
- Spire height: 34 m
- Materials: Stone

The Église Sainte-Geneviève (French pronunciation: [eɡliz sɛ̃t ʒənvjɛv], "Church of St. Genevieve") is a parish church located in the former village of Sainte-Geneviève, Québec (now part of Montreal) on the north-west shore of the Island of Montreal overlooking the Rivière des Prairies. Its affiliation is Roman Catholic and it is administered under the Diocese of Montreal by La Paroisse Sainte-Geneviève de Pierrefonds, founded by Antoine Faucon in 1741. Construction of the church, headed by Louis-Marie Lefèvre, was completed in 1844 and was designed by architect Thomas Baillargé.

== History ==
In 1731 the Société de Saint-Sulpice (Sulpician Order of priests), a Catholic mission in Quebec, granted the first concession of territory to be apportioned to the Paroisse Sainte-Geneviève, one of eighteen parishes that occupied, by 1834, the Island of Montreal. Situated along the north-west shore of the Rivière des Prairies, between Saraguay to the east and Senneville to the west, it was divided in 1731 into 85 smaller parcels of land, and a chapel was constructed there, on parcel number 67, completed in 1739. Antoine Faucon, parish founder, began registering with parishioners two years later.

In 1751 a larger church was constructed and stood until 1847 when it was razed and re-integrated into current structures on the property. A presbytery was also built in 1830. In 1843, Louis-Marie Lefèvre, the fifth priest of the parish from 1828 to 1872, undertook the promoting of a new church and commissioned Québécois architect Thomas Baillargé (1791–1859) to begin work on a layout.

=== Architecture ===
Construction began in 1843 and borrowed heavily from Neo-classic, Colonial and Spanish revival, using materials that were quarried locally. The facade was finished in dimension stone and capped off by two silver spires, or flèches, that towered 34 metres (111 feet) above the ground. In 1868, Monseigneur Ignace Bourget, bishop of the diocese of Montreal, ordered that two statues, one of Saint Anne and the other of Saint Joachim, occupy niches over the main doors.

Interior

Between 1844 and 1847, interior work continued, under the creative direction of Victor Bourgeau, by head contractor Felix Barbeau. The main altar was built by Ambroise Fournier and the side altars by Charles Dauphin in 1863. The stained glass windows were created by O'Shea of Montreal in 1926 and three paintings, situated behind the main altar that depict Sainte-Geneviève, were painted by renowned Quebec artist Ozias Leduc. The crypt, which lies on a foundation measuring a thickness of 90 centimetres (3 feet), contains the remains of Louis-Marie Lefèvre, church founder, who was laid to rest there in 1972.

== Parish ==
Parishioner membership today is estimated to be approximately 8,500 families.

Principals of the parish

- Abbot Robert Sirois, parish priest
- Zbigniew Skowronek, vicar
- Monseigneur Paul-Emile Charbonneau, Sunday vicar
- Abbot Jean D' Avila Prévost
- Jean-Pierre Guertin, deacon
- Jean-Paul Laniel, deacon

Address

- Église Sainte-Geneviève (Sainte-Genevieve Church)
- 16037 Boul Gouin Ouest (West)
- Montreal, QC, CANADA H9H 1C7
- Tel: 514.696.4489 Téléc: 514.620.7179

=== Trivia ===
- On the church grounds, towards the rear of the property that overlooks the scenic riverbank of Rivière des Prairies is a cemetery (sepulchre), used until 1965, that has the remains of 737 parishioners.

== Photos ==
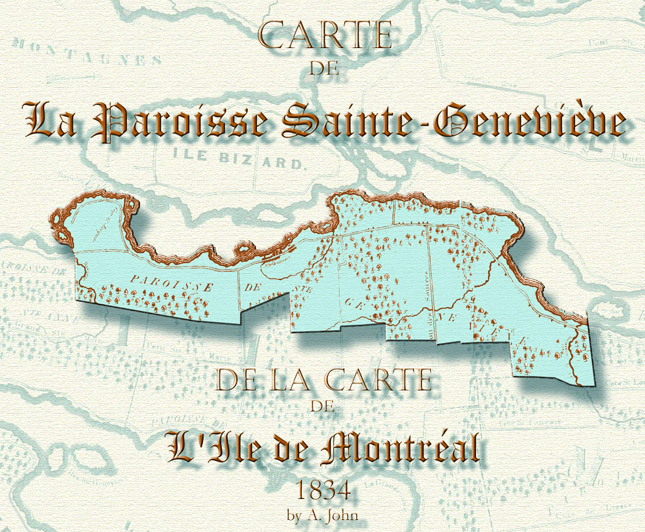
