= St. Patrick's Cathedral (Thunder Bay) =

- Thunder Bay Cathedral
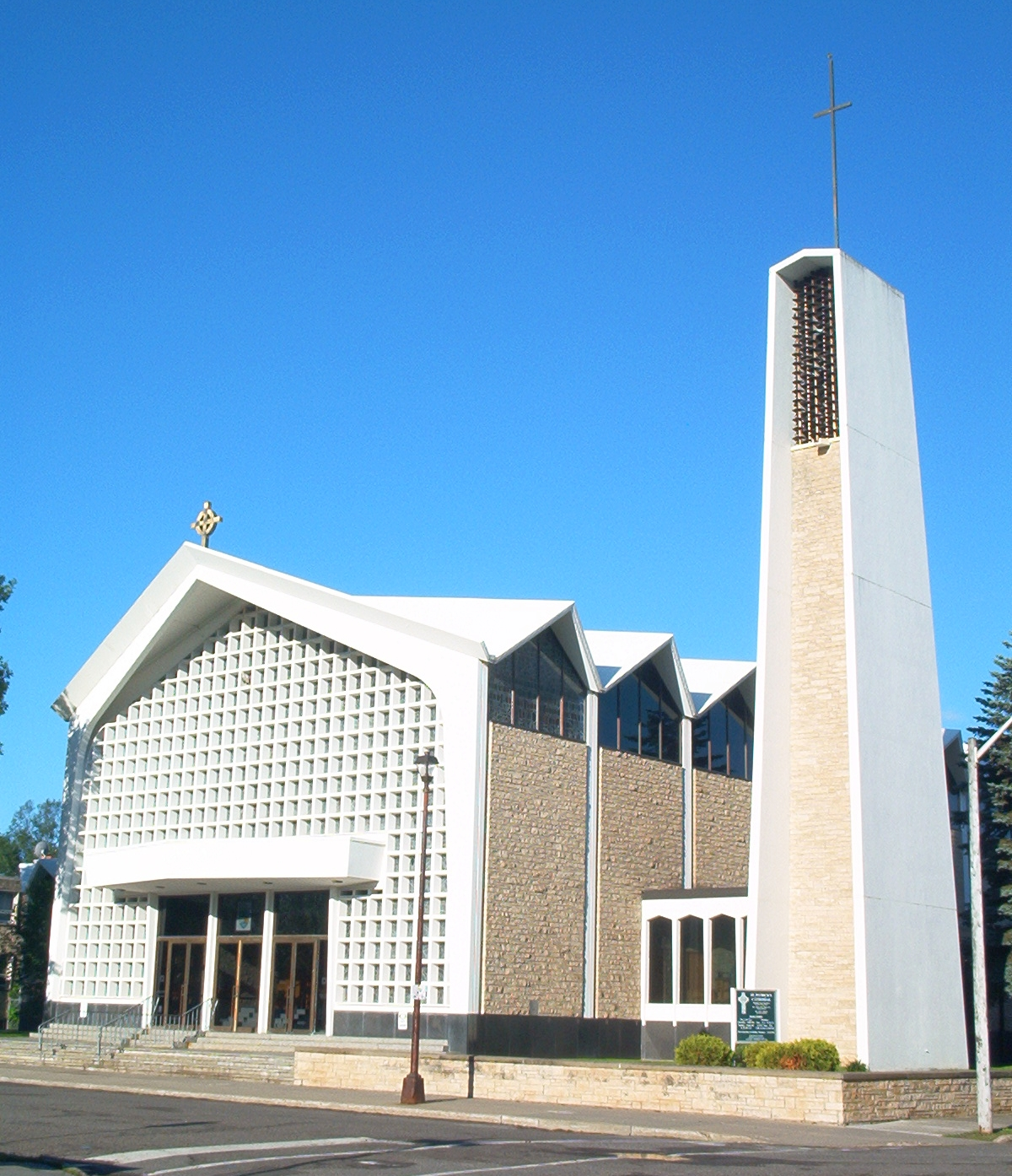
- Front of the cathedral
- St. Patrick's Cathedral
- 48.382241°N 89.249002°W
- Location: Thunder Bay, Ontario
- Country: Canada
- Denomination: Roman Catholic
- Website: StPatricksCathedral.ca

History
- Status: Active
- Founded: October 10, 1891
- Founder: Society of Jesus
- Dedication: Saint Patrick
- Dedicated: 26 August 1894
- Consecrated: 22 August 1952 (cathedral)

Architecture
- Functional status: Cathedral
- Architect(s): H. Rochon; Jean-Paul St Jacques
- Groundbreaking: 15 September 1963
- Completed: 8 September 1964
- Construction cost: $900,000

Administration
- Province: Toronto
- Diocese: Thunder Bay
- Deanery: Central

St. Patrick's Cathedral or Thunder Bay Cathedral is the Roman Catholic cathedral for the Diocese of Thunder Bay. It is situated on the corner of Donald and Archibald Streets in the city.

== History ==
=== Origin ===
The cathedral was founded by the Society of Jesus. They set up the Immaculate Conception Mission (French: Mission de L’Immaculée Conception) for the Fort William First Nation. In July 1849 two French Jesuit missionaries, Fr Pierre Choné (1808-1879) and Fr Nicolas Frémiot (1818-1854) came to the area and started the mission. From there, St. Patrick's Church was one of many churches that was missioned to the First Nations in Northern Ontario, as well as St. Andrew's Church, which was handed over to the diocese in 1997.

=== Construction ===
St. Patrick's was built in 1892, the same year as Thunder Bay was incorporated as a town. The foundation stone was laid on 10 October 1891, and the first Mass was celebrated on 21 August 1892. The Jesuit parish priests made plans for the construction of an elementary school later that decade.

In Autumn 1924, the Jesuits handed over administration of the parish to the Diocese of Sault Sainte Marie.

=== Reconstruction ===
In 1952, the Diocese of Fort William was created and St. Patrick's became its cathedral. In 1970, the diocese was renamed and it became the Diocese of Thunder Bay. From 1955, plans were drawn up to build a new larger cathedral. Three plots of adjacent land was purchased for a total of $50,000. In September 1962, the old church was demolished. A year later, 15 September 1963, the foundation stone of the new cathedral was laid and a year after that, on 8 September 1964, the first Mass was celebrated.

== Parish ==
There are three Sunday Masses at the cathedral. There is one at 5:00pm on Saturday evening and at 8:30am and 10:30am on Sunday morning. There are weekday Masses at 9:00am from Tuesday to Friday.

== See also ==
- Diocese of Thunder Bay
