= St. Peter's Church, Toronto =

St Peter's Church
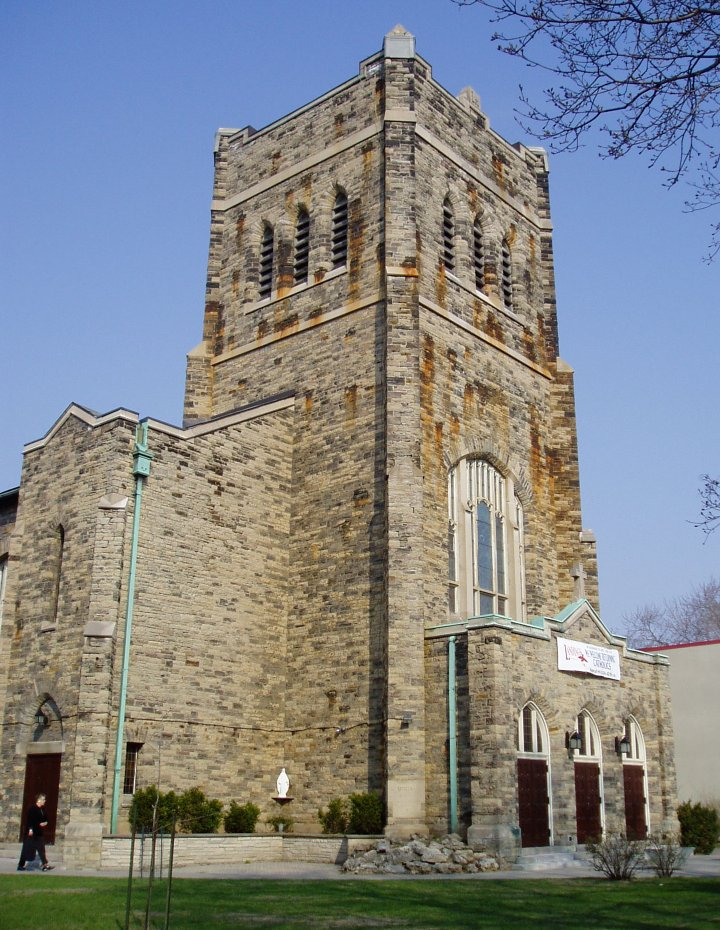
- St Peter's Church
- 43.666065°N 79.411919°W
- Location: 840 Bathurst Street; Toronto, Ontario; M5R 3G1
- Denomination: Roman Catholic
- Website: stpeterstoronto.ca

History
- Status: Active
- Founded: 1906
- Dedication: Saint Peter
- Events: Rebuilt 1925, lift installation 2015

Architecture
- Functional status: Parish church
- Architect: Arthur W. Holmes

Administration
- Archdiocese: Toronto
- Deanery: Downtown

St. Peter's Church is a Catholic parish in Toronto, Ontario, Canada. It is situated close to Bathurst Street in the Mirvish Village area in Downtown Toronto. Until June 2015, it was administered by the Paulist Fathers and was their only presence in Canada. Since then, it has been administered by the Archdiocese of Toronto.

== History ==
The church was originally built in 1906-1907 and was designed by the architect Arthur W. Holmes. He worked on many of the churches in Toronto built around that time, such as the Church of the Holy Name, St. Francis of Assisi and St. Patrick's Church. A Casavant Brothers' organ was installed in 1911; the opening concert was given Jan 12th, the organ played by F. A. Moure and the choir directed by A. Leitheuser.

In 1914, the Archbishop of Toronto, Neil McNeil invited the Paulist Fathers to the city to serve the Newman Centre in the University of Toronto (which they did until 1936) and the parish of St Peter's.

By 1925, the present church was completed to accommodate the growing number of Catholics in the area. In 2011, the bell tower of the church needed renovation because it had become structurally unsafe. The parish raised $400,000 to restore it.

In December, 2015, St. Peter's Church installed a lift system at its front entrance. This Garavanta Lift helped to make the church compliant with the Ontarians with Disabilities Act.

== Parish ==
The parish has four Sunday Masses every week, one at 5:00pm on Saturday evening, 9:00am, 11:15am on Sunday morning and 6:00 pm on Sunday evening. The current pastor is Father Michael McGourty.

The archdiocese owns St. Peter's Parish Centre, at 840 Bathurst Street, which hosts various functions related to the parish and the Archdiocese.
