= List of Catholic churches in Toronto =

This is a list of Roman Catholic churches in Toronto, Ontario, Canada.

The Archdiocese of Toronto covers the city of Toronto and the surrounding areas of the Greater Toronto Area. Toronto is also home to many Eastern Rite churches not part of the archdiocese.

== Archdiocese of Toronto ==
| Congregation | Location | Founded | Style | Notes | Image |
|---|---|---|---|---|---|
| All Saints | Etobicoke | 1964 | | | |
| Annunciation of the Blessed Virgin Mary | North York | 1962 | Modernist | | |
| Blessed Sacrament | Yonge and Lawrence | 1926 | Art Deco | | |
| Blessed Trinity | Bayview Village | 1966 | Modernist | | |
| Canadian Martyrs | East York | 1949 | Modernist | | |
| Christ the King | Long Branch | 1938 | | Polish | |
| Corpus Christi | The Beaches | 1920 | Gothic Revival | | |
| Epiphany of Our Lord | Scarborough | 1974 | Modernist | | |
| Holy Angels | Etobicoke | 1960 | Modernist | | |
| Holy Cross | East York | 1928 | | | |
| Holy Family | Parkdale | 1900 | Palladian | | |
| Holy Name | The Danforth | 1913 | Baroque Revival | | |
| Holy Rosary | Forest Hill | 1909 | Gothic Revival | | |
| Holy Spirit | Tam O'Shanter-Sullivan | 1956 | | | |
| Immaculate Conception | Silverthorn | 1954 | | | |
| Immaculate Heart of Mary | Scarborough | 1951 | Palladian | | |
| Nativity of Our Lord | Etobicoke | 1962 | | | |
| Newman Centre | University of Toronto | 1922 | Richardson Romanesque | University of Toronto Catholic centre, administers St. John Henry Newman Church. | |
| Our Lady Help of Christians | The Annex | 1951 | | Slovene | |
| Our Lady of Fatima | Scarborough | 1951 | Art Deco | | |
| Our Lady of Good Counsel | Dufferin Grove | 1985 | | Caribbean | |
| Our Lady of Guadalupe | Silverthorn | 1984 | | Spanish | |
| Our Lady of Lourdes | St. James Town | 1886 | Neoclassical | Served by the Jesuits | |
| Our Lady of Mount Carmel | Downtown | 1908/1870 (Note: built c. 1870, renamed "Our Lady of Mount Carmel" in 1908) | Gothic Revival | Chinese-Canadian | |
| Our Lady of Peace | Etobicoke | 1951 | Gothic Revival | | |
| Our Lady of Perpetual Help | Moore Park | 1923 | | | |
| Our Lady of Sorrows | Etobicoke | 1940 | Gothic Revival | | |
| Our Lady of the Assumption | Glen Park | 1949 | Gothic Revival | Filipino | |
| Our Lady of the Miraculous Medal | Etobicoke | 1960 | Modernist | Slovenian | |
| Our Lady of the Rosary | Scarborough | 1986 | | Portuguese | |
| Our Lady of Victory | Mount Dennis | 1939 | Palladian | | |
| Our Lady Queen of Croatia | Dufferin Grove | 1951 | Modernist | Croatian | |
| Our Lady Queen of Poland | Scarborough | 1983 | Postmodernist | Polish | |
| Precious Blood | Scarborough | 1932 | | | |
| Prince of Peace | Scarborough | 1983 | | | |
| Resurrection of Our Lord Jesus Christ | Etobicoke | 1954-56, redesigned in 1975-76 (demolished, a new one was built in 2000 at different place) | Modernist (architect Stasys Kudokas, later - Alfredas Kulpa-Kulpavičius) | Lithuanian | Lithuanian Resurrection of Our Lord Jesus Christ Parish and Church. Designed by Lithuanian architect Stasys Kudokas in 1954-56 |
| Sacre-Coeur | Downtown | 1887 | Gothic Revival | Francophone | |
| Sacred Heart of Jesus | Etobicoke | 2001 | | Korean | |
| Santa Cruz | Trinity-Bellwoods | 1974 | | Portuguese | |
| St. Agnes' | Trinity-Bellwoods | 1914 | Gothic Revival | Portuguese | |
| St. Aidan's | Scarborough | 1988 | Postmodernist | | |
| St. Alphonsus | Forest Hill | 1966 | Gothic Revival | | |
| St. Ambrose | Etobicoke | 1953 | | | |
| St. Andrew Kim's | Don Mills | 1981 | Modernist | Korean | |
| St. Andrew's | Etobicoke | 1965 | Modernist | | |
| St. Ann's | Riverside South | 1908 | Palladian | Also home to Native Peoples' Mission | |
| St. Anselm's | Leaside | 1938 | Modernist | | |
| St. Anthony's | Dovercourt | 1909 | Gothic Revival | | |
| St. Augustine of Canterbury | Jane and Finch | 1967 | Modernist | Served by the Institute of the Incarnate Word | |
| St. Barnabas | Scarborough | 1976 | | | |
| St. Bartholomew's | Scarborough | 1968 | Brutalist | | |
| St. Basil's | Downtown | 1855 | Gothic Revival | Part of St. Michael's College | |
| St. Benedict's | Etobicoke | 1955 | | | |
| St. Bernard de Clairvaux | Amesbury | 1951 | | | |
| St. Bonaventure's | Don Mills | 1958 | Modernism | Franciscan | |
| St. Boniface | Scarborough | 1955 | Neo Gothic | | |
| St. Brigid's | East Danforth | 1920 | Gothic Revival | | |
| St. Casimir's | Roncesvalles | 1949 | Gothic Revival | Polish | |
| St. Catherine of Siena | East Danforth | 1965 | Modernist | | |
| St. Cecilia's | The Junction | 1909 | Gothic Revival | Also home to Vietnamese Martyrs Parish | |
| St. Charles Borromeo | Lawrence Heights | 1948 | | | |
| St. Clare's | Oakwood | 1913 | Baroque Revival | | |
| St. Clement's | Etobicoke | 1967 | | | |
| St. Dunstan's | Oakridge | 1923 | Modernist | | |
| St. Edith Stein | Thorncliffe Park | 1972 | Modernist | | |
| St. Edward the Confessor | Willowdale | 1942 | Modernist | | |
| St. Elizabeth of Hungary | Willowdale | 1928 | Modernist | Hungarian | |
| St. Eugene's Chapel | Lawrence Manor | 1943 | | | |
| St. Fidelis | Lawrence Heights | 1975 | | | |
| St. Francis of Assisi, Toronto | Little Italy | 1902 | Gothic Revival | | |
| St. Gabriel of the Sorrowful Virgin | Bayview Village | 1951 | Neo-modernist | Served by the Passionists | |
| St. Gregory's | Etobicoke | 1957 | Modernist | | |
| St. Helen's | Brockton, Toronto | 1875 | Gothic Revival | Portuguese | |
| St. James | Runnymede | 1920 | Modernist | | |
| St. Jane Frances | Jane and Finch | 1970 | Modernist | Served by Franciscan Friars | |
| St. Joan of Arc | near High Park | 1919, 1966 | Modernist | Original church built 1919 at Dundas St W and Edna Ave. Move to Bloor St in 1966 because of subway construction. | |
| St. John Bosco | Fairbank | 1960 | Modernist | | |
| St. John the Baptist | Trinity-Bellwoods | 1981 | Modernist | Spanish | |
| St. John the Evangelist | Weston | 1913 | | | |
| St. John XXIII | Flemingdon Park | 1977 | Modernist | | |
| St. John's | The Beaches | 1909 | Gothic Revival | | |
| St. Joseph's | Leslieville | 1878 | Modernist | Also home to Our Lady of Good Health, a Tamil parish | |
| St. Joseph's, Scarborough | Scarborough | 1929 | | | |
| St. Jude's | Emery | 1961 | | | |
| St. Lawrence Martyr | Scarborough | 1959 | Italianate | | |
| St. Leo's | Mimico | 1908 | | Also serves Italians | |
| St. Louis-de-France | Don Mills | 1967 | Modernist | French | |
| St. Margaret of Scotland | Ledbury Park | 1950 | Modernist | | |
| St. Maria Goretti | Scarborough | 1955 | Modernist | | |
| St. Mark's | Etobicoke | 1955 | | | |
| St. Martin de Porres | Scarborough | 1968 | | | |
| St. Mary of the Angels | Davenport | 1915 | | | |
| St. Mary's | Downtown | 1852 | Gothic Revival | | |
| St. Mary's | Carleton Village | 1914 | | Polish | |
| St. Matthew's | Earlscourt | 1933 | Modernist | | |
| St. Michael's Cathedral | Downtown | 1845 | Gothic Revival | The Roman Catholic cathedral of Toronto | |
| St. Monica's | Yonge and Eglinton | 1908 | Modernist | | |
| St. Nicholas of Bari | Earlscourt | 1976 | Modernist | | |
| St. Norbert's | North York | 1968 | | | |
| St. Patrick's | Downtown | 1850/1908 (Note: existed as a parish c. 1850, current building built 1908) | Romanesque Revival | Also home to St. Patrick's German Parish | |
| St. Paul's Basilica | Corktown | 1822 | Italianate | Oldest Roman Catholic congregation in Toronto | |
| St. Paul the Apostle | The Junction | 1930 | | Maltese | |
| St. Peter's | The Annex | 1896 | Gothic Revival | | |
| St. Philip Neri | North York | 1951 | | | |
| St. Pius X | Bloor West Village | 1951 | Modernist | | |
| St. Roch's | Humber Summit | 1968 | Modernist | | |
| St. Rose of Lima | Scarborough | 1959 | | | |
| St. Sebastian's | Brockton | 1967 | | Portuguese | |
| St. Stanislaus Kostka | Downtown | 1911 | Gothic Revival | Polish | |
| St. Stephen's Chapel | Downtown | 1977 | | | |
| St. Teresa's | New Toronto | 1924 | | Polish | |
| St. Theresa's | Scarborough | 1934 | Mission Revival Style | | |
| St. Thomas Aquinas | Fairbank | 1930 | Gothic | | |
| St. Thomas More | Scarborough | 1964 | | | |
| St. Timothy's | The Peanut | 1966 | Modernist | | |
| St. Vincent de Paul | Roncesvalles | 1914 | Neo-Classical | Also home to the Catholic Parish of St. Thomas More, an Anglican Use parish | |
| St. Wenceslaus | Dovercourt | 1952 | Industrial | Czech | |
| St. Wilfrid's | North York | 1965 | Modernist | | |
| Transfiguration of Our Lord | Etobicoke | 1959 | | | |

== Eastern Rite ==
| Congregation | Eparchy/Church | Location | Founded | Notes | Image |
|---|---|---|---|---|---|
| Byzantine Slovak Cathedral of the Nativity of the Mother of God | Slovak | Trinity-Bellwoods | 1959 | Cathedral, and sole remaining church of the Eparchy of Sts. Cyril and Methodius | |
| St. Alphonsa Syro-Malabar Catholic Cathedral | Rite: Syro-Malabar, Eparchy: Syro-Malabar Catholic Eparchy of Mississauga | Mississauga | 2007 | Cathedral of the rapidly growing Syro-Malabar Catholic Eparchy of Mississauga | |
| St. Thomas Syro-Malabar Catholic Church | Rite: Syro-Malabar, Eparchy: Syro-Malabar Catholic Eparchy of Mississauga | Scarborough | 1977 | Second largest church in the Syro-Malabar Catholic Eparchy of Mississauga | |
| Christ the Good Shepherd at St. Michael U.C.C. | Ukrainian | New Toronto | | | |
| Church of the Holy Protection | Ukrainian | Christie Pits | | | |
| Dormition of the Mother of God Ukrainian Catholic Church | Ukrainian | Trinity-Bellwoods | | | |
| Holy Eucharist Ukrainian Catholic Church | Ukrainian | Riverdale | | | |
| Our Lady of Lebanon Maronite Catholic Church | Maronite | Parkdale | | | |
| Our Lady of Comfort & Mercy Eritrean | Eritrean | Corso Italia | | Meets at St. Nicholas of Bari | |
| St. Basil The Great Ukrainian Catholic Church | Ukrainian | Oakwood-Vaughan | | | |
| St. Demetrius the Great Martyr Ukrainian Catholic Church | Ukrainian | Etobicoke | 1959 | Ukrainian Greek Catholic Church | |
| St Gregory the Illuminator Armenian Catholic | Armenian | York Mills | 1973 | | |
| St. Josaphat's Cathedral | Ukrainian | Junction Triangle | | | |
| St. Mary's Syro Malankara Catholic Church | Syro-Malankara | North York | | Meets at St. Norbert's Catholic Church | |
| St. Nicholas Ukrainian Catholic Church | Ukrainian | Trinity-Bellwoods | | | |
| Sts. Peter and Paul Ukrainian Catholic Church | Ukrainian | Malvern | 1979 | | |
| Annunciation Byzantine Romanian | Romanian Church United with Rome, Greek-Catholic | Moore Park | 2001 | Meet at Our Lady of Perpetual Help church | |
| Good Shepherd Chaldean | Chaldean Catholic Church | North York | 1988 | Built in 2000 | |
| Holy Family Coptic | Coptic Catholic Church | Etobicoke | 1994 | | |
| Jesus the King Melkite Catholic Church | Melkite Greek Catholic Church | | 1870,1960 | | |

== See also ==
- List of Anglican churches in Toronto
- List of Orthodox churches in Toronto
- List of Presbyterian churches in Toronto
- List of United Church of Canada churches in Toronto
