= St. Helens Catholic Church =

St. Helen's Church
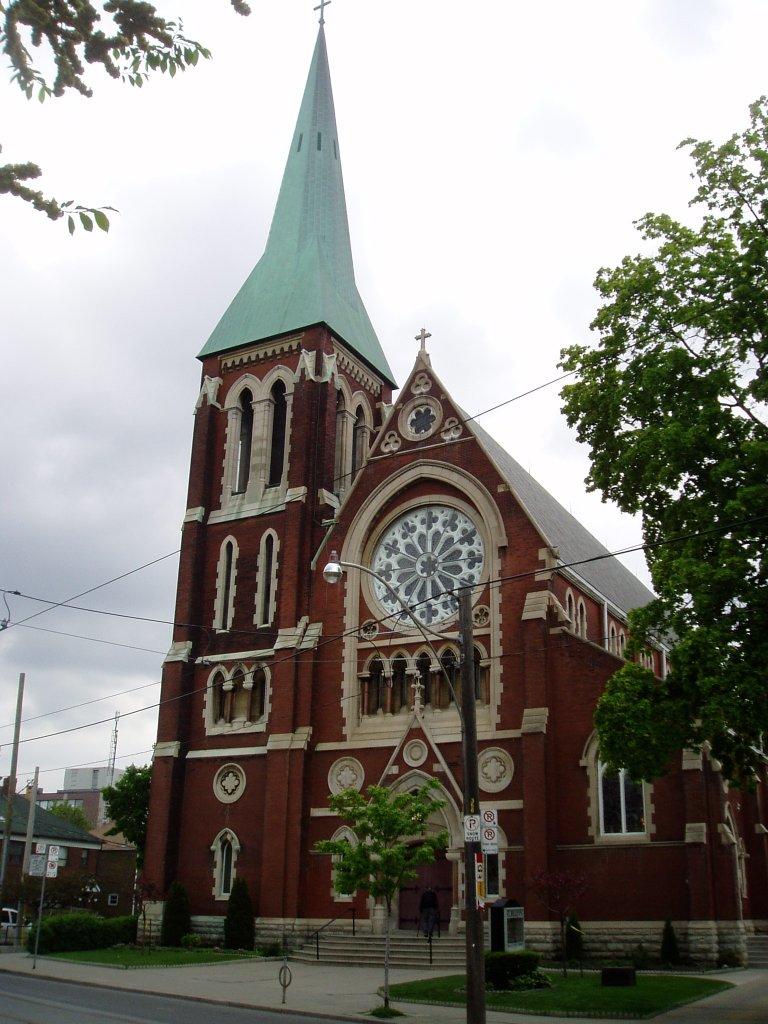
- St. Helen's Church
- 43.650249°N 79.437487°W
- Location: 1680 Dundas Street West; Toronto, Ontario, Canada
- Denomination: Catholic Church
- Website: sthelensto.archtoronto.org

History
- Founded: 1875

Architecture
- Architect: Arthur William Holmes
- Style: Gothic Revival
- Years built: 1908-1909

Administration
- Archdiocese: Toronto

Clergy
- Pastor: Rev. Vando Marques Gomes

St. Helens Catholic Church is located in Toronto, Canada.

== History ==
St. Helen's Parish was established in 1875 in Brockton village, just outside the city of Toronto's western boundaries. The parish was formed from St. Mary's Parish. The first pastor for the church was Rev. Father Shea. St. Helen's Church was original located on the southwest corner of Lansdowne Avenue and Dundas Street West, one block west of its current location. St. Helen's Catholic School was established in the basement of the building, before a school building was built next door.

St. Helen's was the focal point of Catholic life in Toronto's 19th-century western suburbs. In a city dominated by Protestants, many of the streets surrounding the church had Catholic majorities, yet the neighbourhood's Catholics were generally well integrated with the Protestant majority. The parish grew quickly as English-speaking Catholics found work in the neighbourhood's chocolate factories, railway yards, foundries, and industry. As a result, a new St. Helen's Church was built 1909 and the original church was demolished.

Arthur William Holmes, a prominent ecclesiastical architect, designed the existing Gothic Revival-style church on Dundas Street. The new building was completed in 1909; however, the spire was not erected until 1920.

Holmes designed the building in a style typical of large Anglican and Catholic churches in England and Ireland. The front of the church includes a large rose-window above a gothic arch, similar to St. Mary's Church on Bathurst Street. The church's interior design is traditional, reflecting the style of Pope Pius X, who was "implacably hostile to modernizing, liberalizing trends in the Church."

The new church was the second largest Catholic church in Toronto, after St. Michael's Cathedral Basilica. In the 1950s, the church became home to a thriving Italian congregation and later a vibrant Portuguese congregation, as the neighbourhood became known as Little Portugal. In 2000, the church received a papal blessing from Pope John Paul II to mark its 125th anniversary.

== See also ==
- List of Roman Catholic churches in Toronto
