= Nachum Kaplan =

Rabbi (1811–1879)

Rabbi Menachem Nachum Kaplan
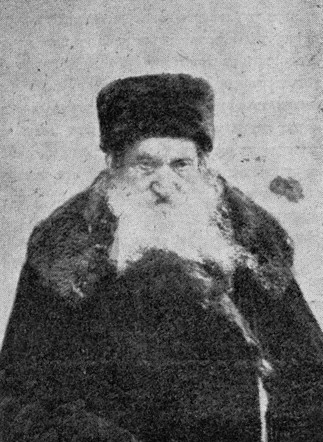

Personal life
- Born: 1811 Baisogala, Russian Empire
- Died: October 25, 1879 (age 68) Grodno, Russian Empire
- Buried: Grodno
- Spouse: Itta
- Parent(s): Uziel and Meida Kaplan

Religious life
- Religion: Judaism
- Synagogue: Chevrah HaShas
- Position: shammash
- Yahrtzeit: 8 Cheshvan, 5640 A.M.
- Residence: Grodno

Reb Menachem Nachum ben Uzziel Kaplan (1811 – October 25, 1879) was a Lithuanian Talmudist, philanthropist, and Talmid Chacham who was known throughout Lithuania and Poland as Reb Nachum'ke of Horodna or Reb Nahum Grodner.

Rabbi Kaplan was well-versed in the Talmud and the poskim as well as in kabbalah and Acharonim. Yet, he refused to render halachic decisions (except for one occasion when it was a matter of life and death) and held the humble position of shammash (sexton) in the Synagogue Chevra Shas. His piety, simplicity of life, and dedication to the community earned him recognition among the Russian Jewry.

== Biography ==
Rabbi Nachum was born in Baisogala to Uziel Kaplan, a laborer in a whisky distillery, and his wife, Meida.

In his youth, he studied under Rabbi Karpl Atlas of Baisogala (grandfather of Rabbi Meir Atlas) and his sons, Binyamin Beinush and Meir. Later he studied at Šiauliai under Rabbi Mordechai Ganker, and afterwards at the yeshiva of Rabbi Chalavna Lapidus, the maggid of Luokė, after which he studied at Vilnius. At age 19, he decided to leave Vilnius in order to study at Ashmyany under Rabbi Avraham Kahana of Horodna (known today as Grodno). After studying for a while at Ashmyany, he went on to study at the Yeshiva of Mir.

When he was about twenty years old, he married Itta, the daughter of Yosef Eliezer (a chimney sweep by trade) of Nesvizh, and moved into the latter's home in Nesvizh. Throughout the day, he studied Gemara, halacha, and works of hashkafah such as Chovot HaLevavot and Menoras HaMaor until he committed them to memory.

When he was in his early twenties, he decided to leave Nesvizh and traveled to Valozhyn, where he studied at the Volozhin Yeshiva under Rabbi Eliezer Yitzchak Freid. Afterwards, he headed for Kaunas where he studied Gemara and halacha under the rav of the city, Rabbi Menachem Mendel Rabinowitz. He also studied Midrash and Aggadah under Rabbi Eliyahu Ragoler of Slabodka. During this time, he traveled to Torez where he studied the teachings of the Vilna Gaon under a student of Rabbi Chaim of Volozhin.

Afterwards, he returned to Nesvizh and a short while later he moved to Horodna. During the almost fifty years that he lived there, he was offered many prominent positions. Yet, he refused opportunities for leadership in public life, choosing instead the position of shammash in the Synagogue Chevra Shas in Horodna, a position he retained for the rest of his life.

In the last years of his life, he suffered from a serious spinal disorder, a severe intestinal ailment, swelling of the feet, and other discomforts. Yet, on Simchat Torah, he led the congregation in spirited singing and dancing, clutching a Sefer Torah in one arm while his free hand held his stomach to ease the pain.

A Hebrew language biography of Rabbi Nachum was written by Rabbi Yisrael David Miller who knew Rabbi Nachum personally. Rabbi Miller was stricken by the cholera pandemic that struck Horodna in 1872 and firmly believed that Rabbi Nachum's prayers saved his life.

Rabbi Nachum died at Grodno on October 25, 1879. Twenty thousand people attended his funeral which took place the next day.

His son-in-law was Rabbi Gavriel Zev Margolis.
