= St. Paul the Apostle Church (Toronto) =

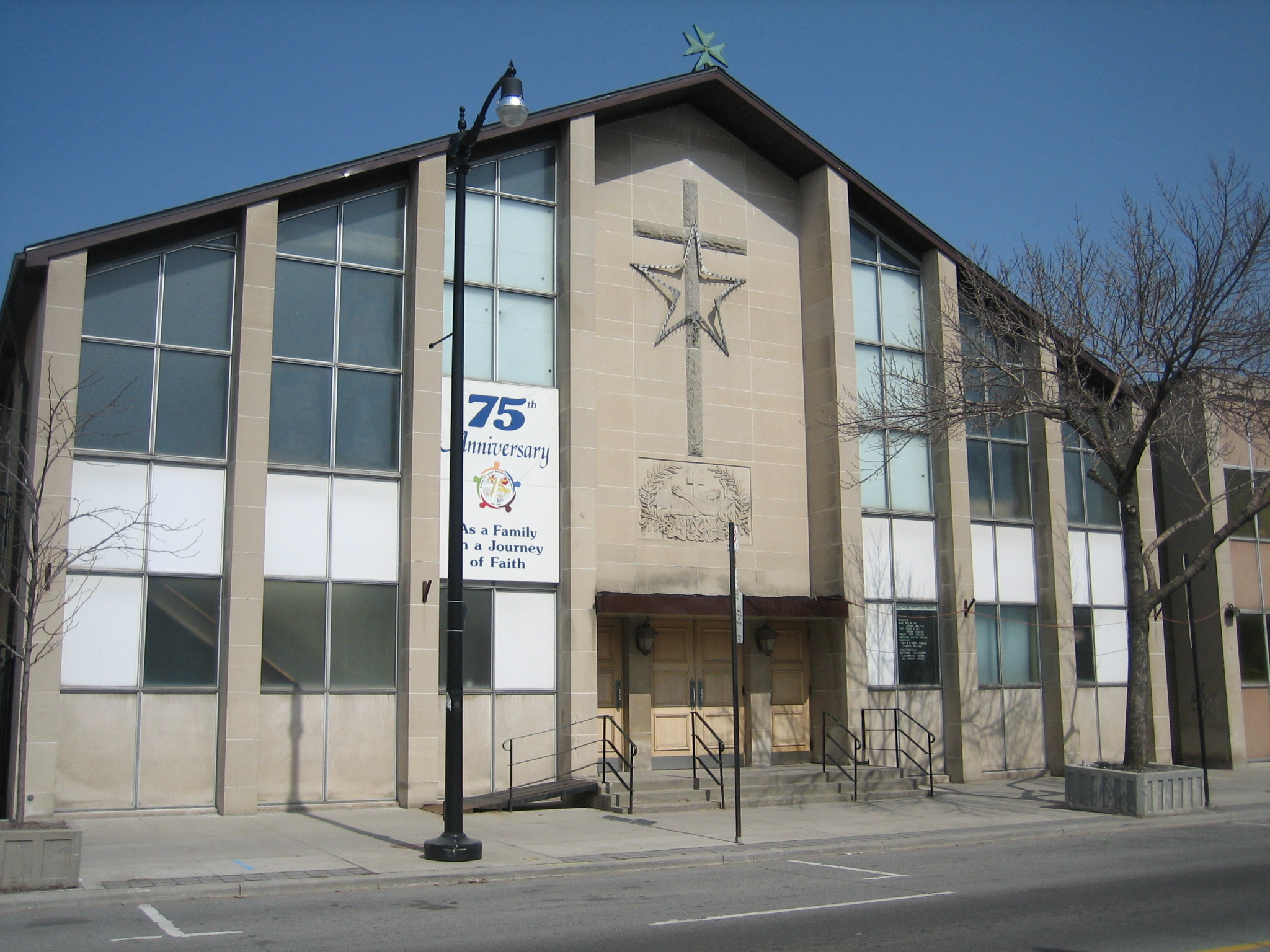
- St. Paul the Apostle Church on Dundas Street West (2005)
- St. Paul the Apostle Church
- 43.665854°N 79.477437°W
- Location: 3224 Dundas Street West; Toronto, Ontario
- Country: Canada
- Denomination: Roman Catholic
- Website: stpaultheapostleto.archtoronto.org

History
- Founded: 1930
- Dedication: St. Paul the Apostle

Administration
- Diocese: Archdiocese of Toronto

St. Paul the Apostle is a Roman Catholic church in Toronto, Ontario, Canada. It is located at Dundas Street West in The Junction neighbourhood.

The church was primarily built in 1930 by the Maltese-Canadian community of Toronto. A larger, new church was built on the ground by the same community in 1956.

== See also ==
- List of Roman Catholic churches in Toronto
