= Gavriel Zev Margolis =

American Orthodox rabbi

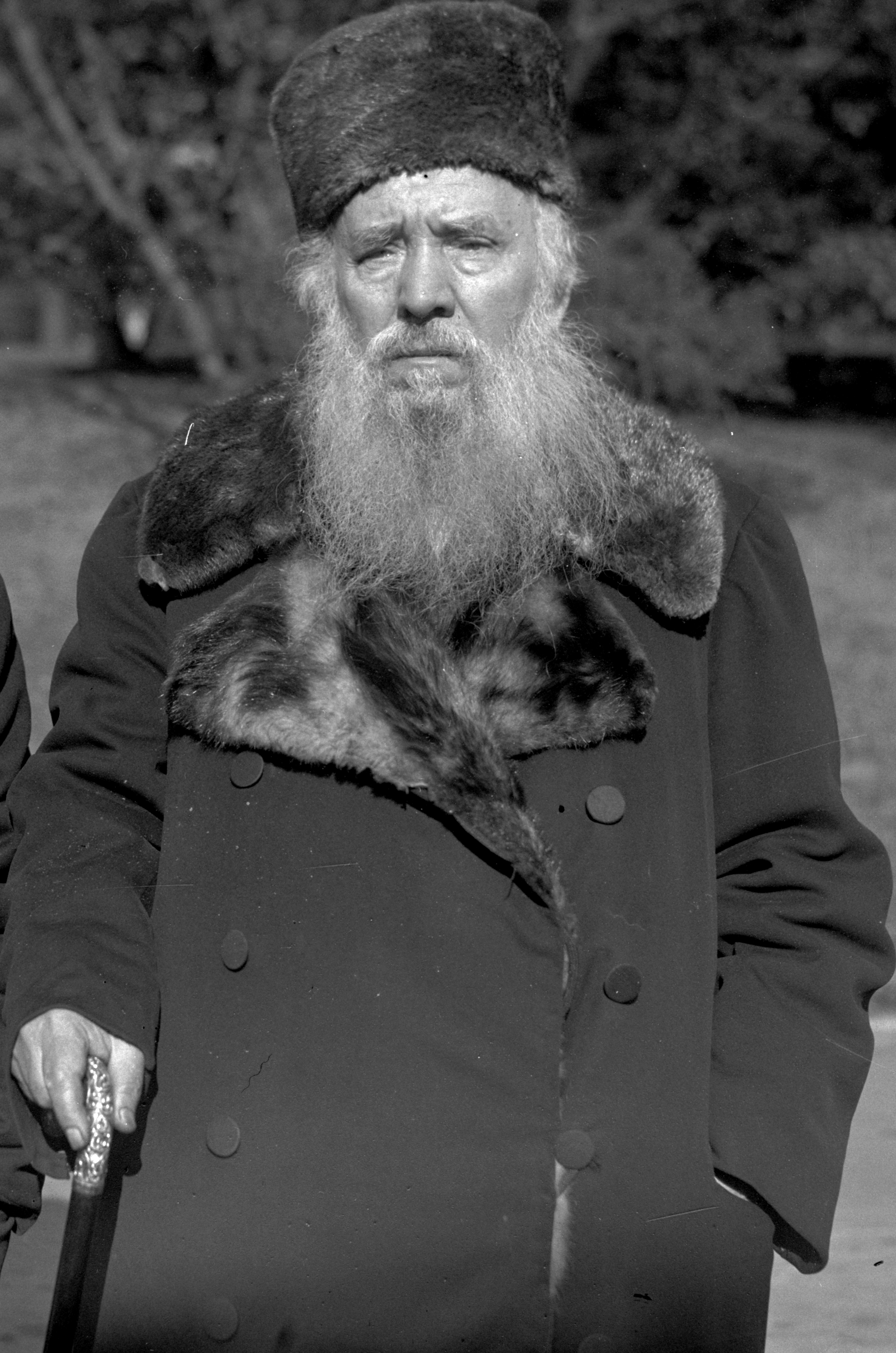
Rabbi Gavriel Zev Margolies, 1925

Rabbi Gavriel ("Reb Velvel") Zev Margolies (1847 in Vilna – 1935 in New York City) was an Orthodox Rabbi in the United States known for being an uncompromising traditionalist.

== Biography ==
Margolis was born 27 Cheshvan 5608, which corresponds to November 5-6, 1847, in Vilnius, Lithuania. He married Shelma Esther Kaplan in 1866; his father in law was Nachum Kaplan.

Margolis was ordained by Rabbi Jacob Barit and Rabbi Naphtali Judah Berlin. He taught and preached in Grodno (where his father-in-law Rabbi Nachum Grodno lived), before being invited to Vilna to assist Rabbi Eizele Charif publish his commentary on the Jerusalem Talmud. He later served as the head of the rabbinical courts in Mogilev Province, and Jasionowka.

In 1907 Margolis immigrated to the United States, settling in Boston, where he served as chief rabbi of seven local congregations. Moses Z. Margolies had served in the position of Orthodox rabbi in Boston for the previous seven years.

In 1910 he helped form a kosher supervising agency in Rochester, New York.

In 1911, at the request of the Board of Directors of Congregation Adas Yisroel of New York due to a dispute about kashrus among other religious concerns in the city, he moved to New York and became the rabbi of the synagogue, The synagogue later changed its legal name to United Hebrew Community of New York/Adas Yisroel of New York. Margolis held the position for the rest of his life. He had an apartment in the synagogue's building.

He was soon thereafter appointed as New York's Chief of Rabbinic Courts and was the founder and president of the Knesseth HaRabbonim (Assembly of Hebrew Orthodox Rabbis) for 25 successive years. He was also president of the Central Council of Rabbis of Greater New York.

He was involved in a number of disputes in his lifetime due to his religious views, and frequently sparred with many other rabbis in the city over communal matters. He was against Secular Zionism. And also had concerns about the process of study of the Rabbis ordained by Yeshiva College. Additionally, he had issues with the Aguddas Harabbonim for supporting Yeshiva College even after he expressed his concerns.

Margolis was a prolific author of Jewish commentary. Among the many seforim/books that he wrote are: Shem Olam, Toras Gavriel, Chruzei Margolios, Agudas Eizov and Ginzei Margolios on the Book of Esther, Shir Hashirim, the Book of Ruth, Koheles and Eichah.

He died on the 10th of Elul 5695 / September 8, 1935, just a few months before his 88th birthday. At the time, he was the oldest serving rabbi in America, and was called the "Dean of the Rabbinate." (Both of the descriptions would be applied one year later to Moses Z. Margolies upon his passing; Margolies was born three years later than Margolis.)

His funeral was attended by more than 10,000 people in front of his synagogue and home, stretching a quarter mile down the streets of the Lower East Side, and he was buried on the grounds of Adas Yisroel of New York United Hebrew Community of New York in Montefiore Cemetery in Queens.

Joshua Hoffman wrote a thesis entitled: "The American Rabbinic Career of Rabbi Gavriel Zev Margolis".
