= Baisogala =

- Town
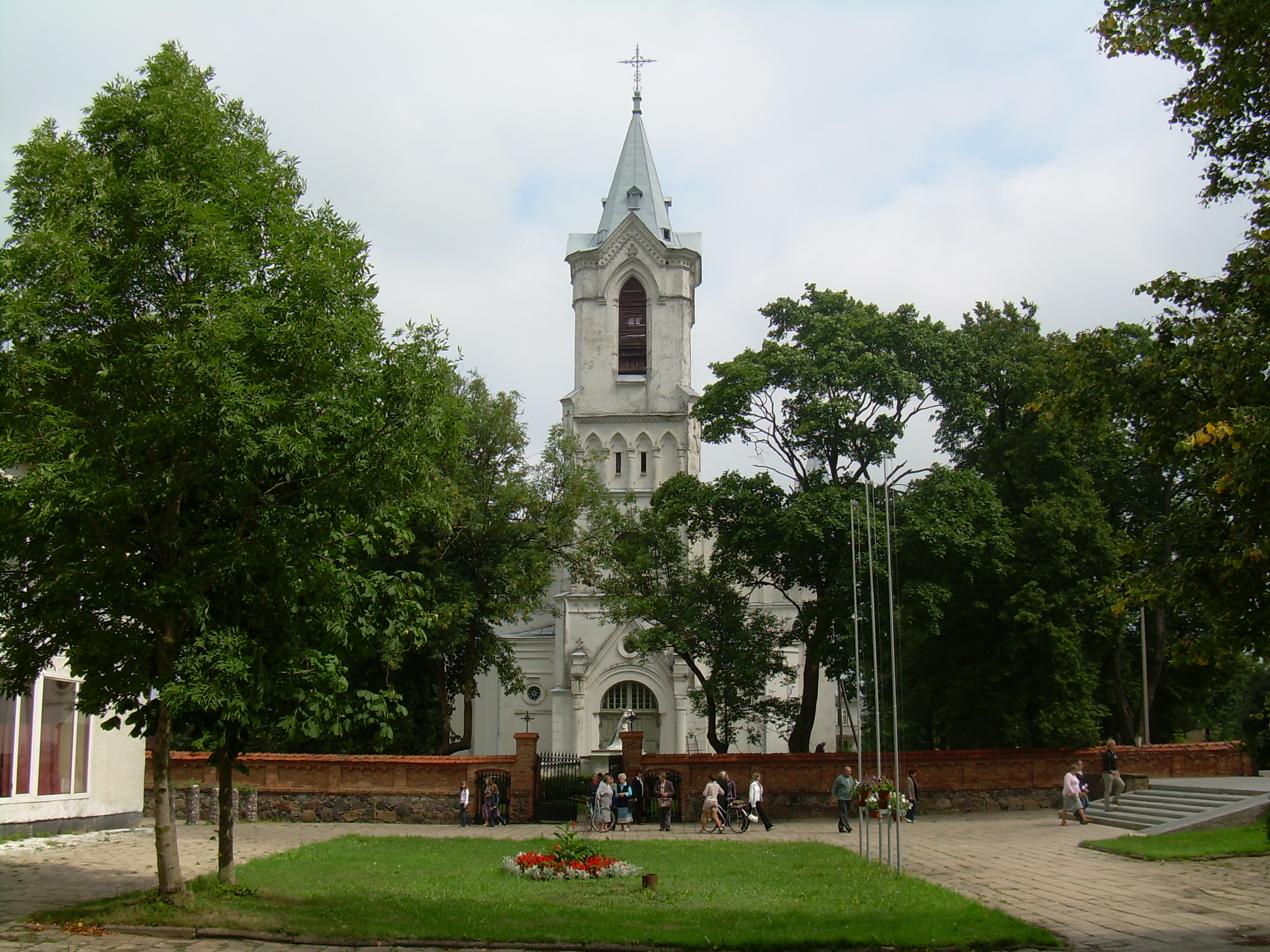

- Coat of arms

- Location of Baisogala
- Coordinates: 55°38′20″N 23°43′20″E
- Country: Lithuania
- Ethnographic region: Aukštaitija
- County: Šiauliai County
- Municipality: Radviliškis district municipality
- Eldership: Baisogala eldership
- Capital of: Baisogala eldership
- First mentioned: 1539

Population (2011)
  - Total: 1,694
- Time zone: UTC+2 (EET)
  - Summer (DST): UTC+3 (EEST)

Baisogala is a small town in Lithuania. It is situated on the crossroads of Kėdainiai–Šeduva and Raseiniai–Šeduva roads. According to the 2021 census, it had 1,694 residents.

== History ==
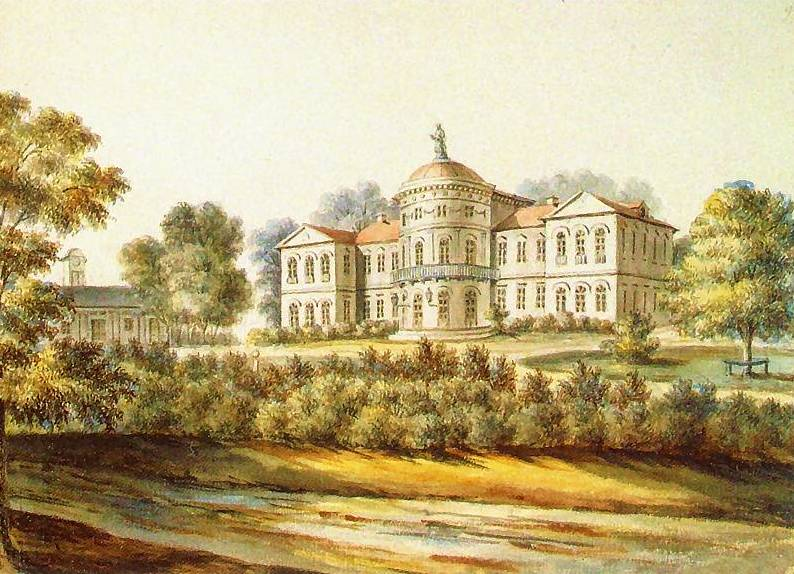
Baisogala Manor, 19th century

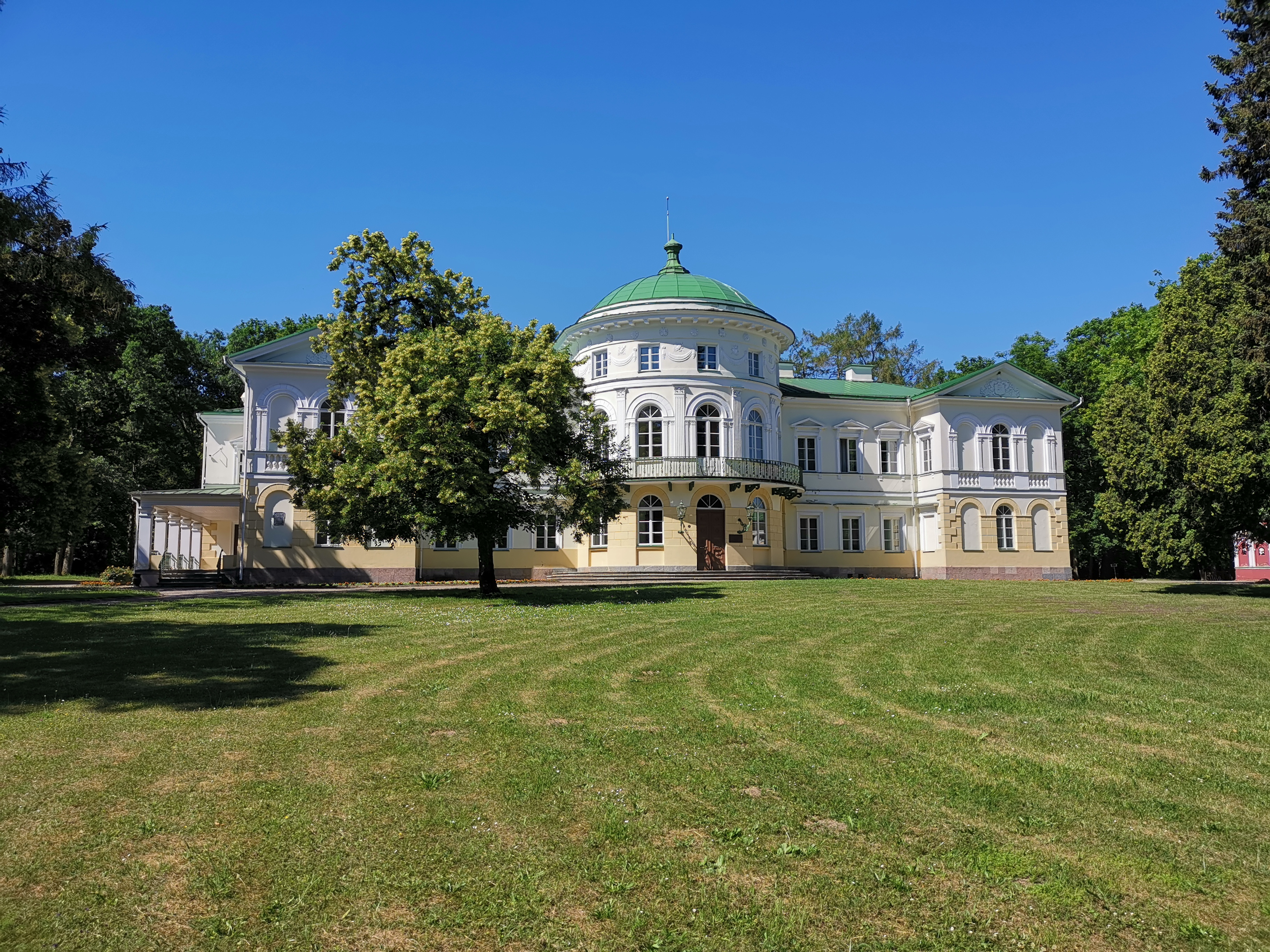
Baisogala Manor, 2019

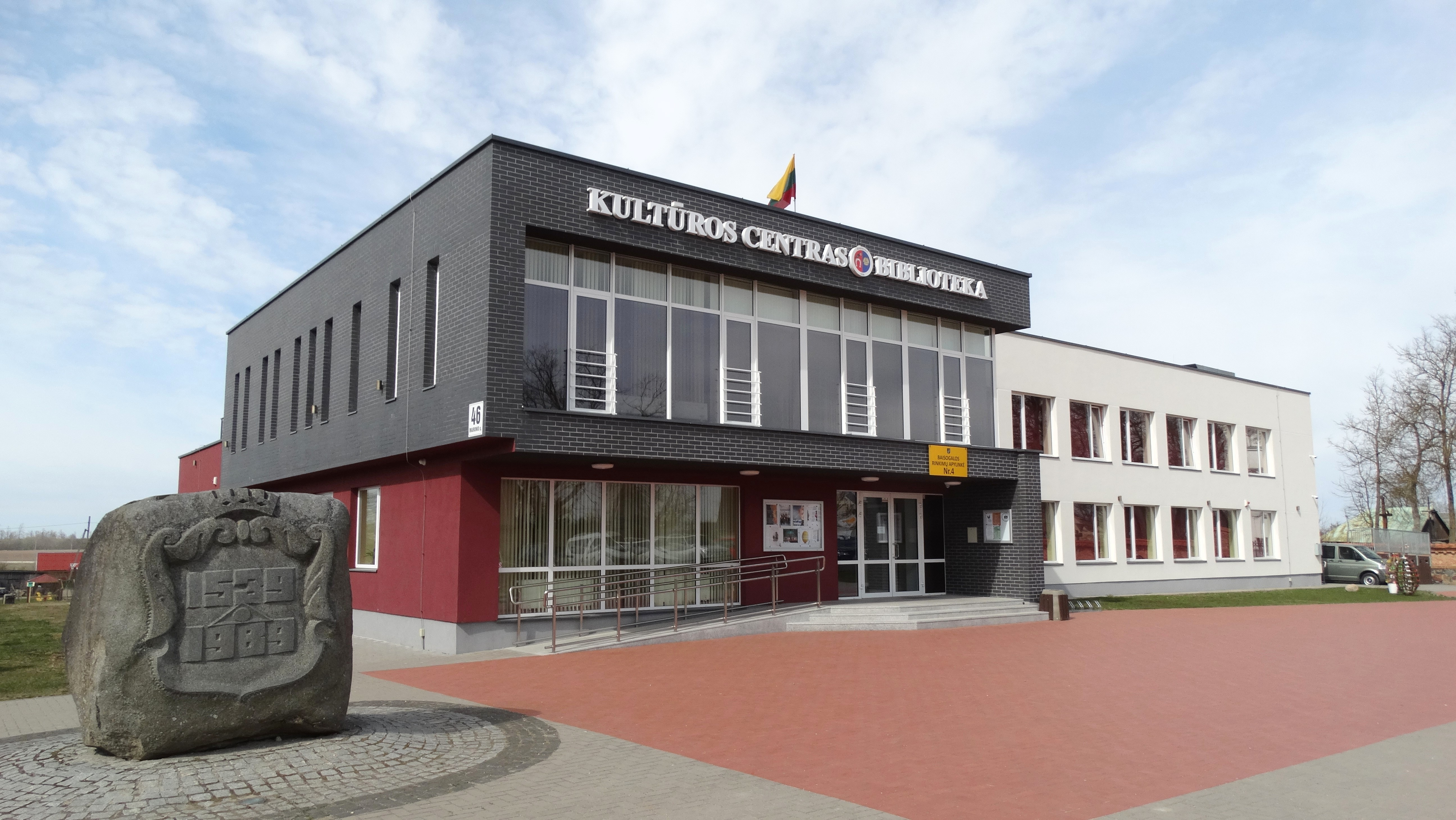
Basiogala culture centre

Baisogala is first mentioned in written sources in 1539 when King Sigismund I the Old established a parish with seat in the town. Archeologists discovered cemeteries from the 5th and 6th centuries near the town suggesting the people inhabited the area well before the 16th century. In the 17th century, the town was granted to the Radvila family and changed hands a few times. In 1791 the town was granted city privileges according to the Magdeburg law. Eventually, the town was bought in 1830 by Joseph Komar, a former colonel of Napoleon Bonaparte. The Komar family remained in Baisogala until 1940 when the Soviets arrested and deported the family to Kazakhstan. Their large and decorated manor is quite well preserved and surrounded by 12 hectares (30 acres) of park.

=== Religion ===
The first church was built by King Sigismund II Augustus, but it did not survive. The church in the present location was built in 1781 and rebuilt in 1882 with financial support from the Komar family.

== Economy ==
In 2024, the government signed a deal with a German defence company Rheinmetall to build an artillery ammunition plant. The company will invest €180m into the plant, becoming a major employer in Baisogala. The groundbreaking ceremony for the factory was on November 4, 2025.

== Notable people from Baisogala ==
- Nachum Kaplan
- Arvydas Každailis
- Alfredas Kulpa-Kulpavičius
- Estanislao Shilinsky Bachanska
