= Baisogala Manor =

Coordinates: 55°38′12″N 23°43′01″E

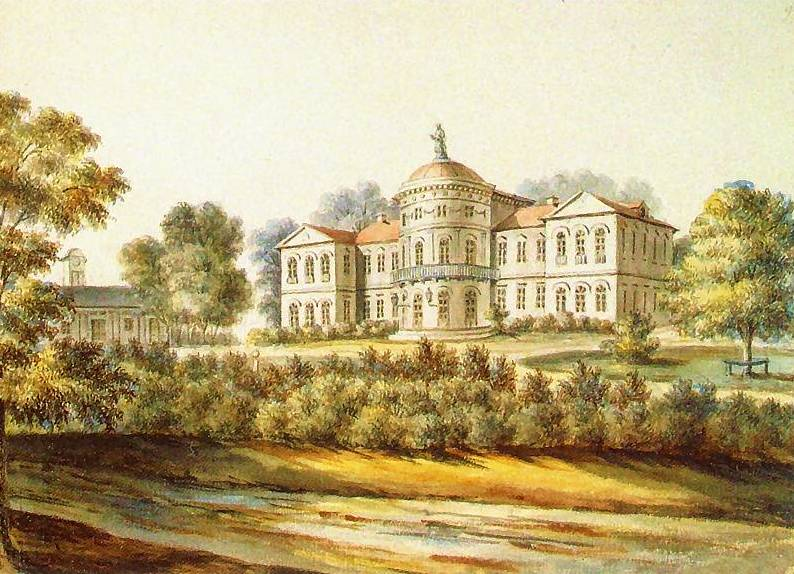
- Baisogala Manor (by Napoleon Orda)
- Interactive map of the Baisogala Manor area

General information
- Type: Residential manor
- Location: Baisogala, Lithuania
- Renovated: 2008

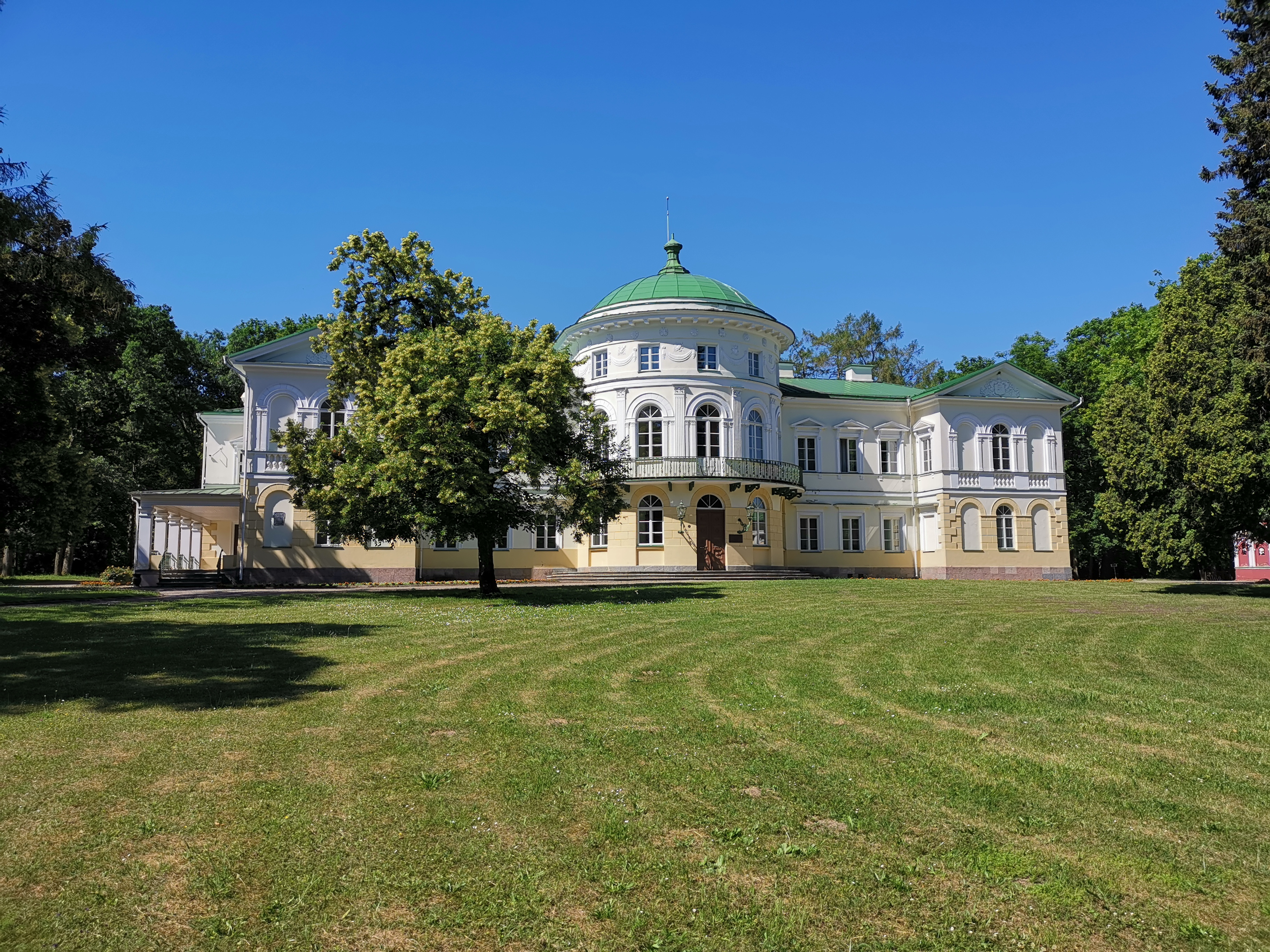
Baisogala Manor (2019

Baisogala Manor is a former residential manor in Baisogala town, Radviliškis district. During the Soviet occupation, it was used as an administrative building of Institute of Animal. The manor was reconstructed in 2008.
