= Immaculate Conception Church (Peterborough, Ontario) =

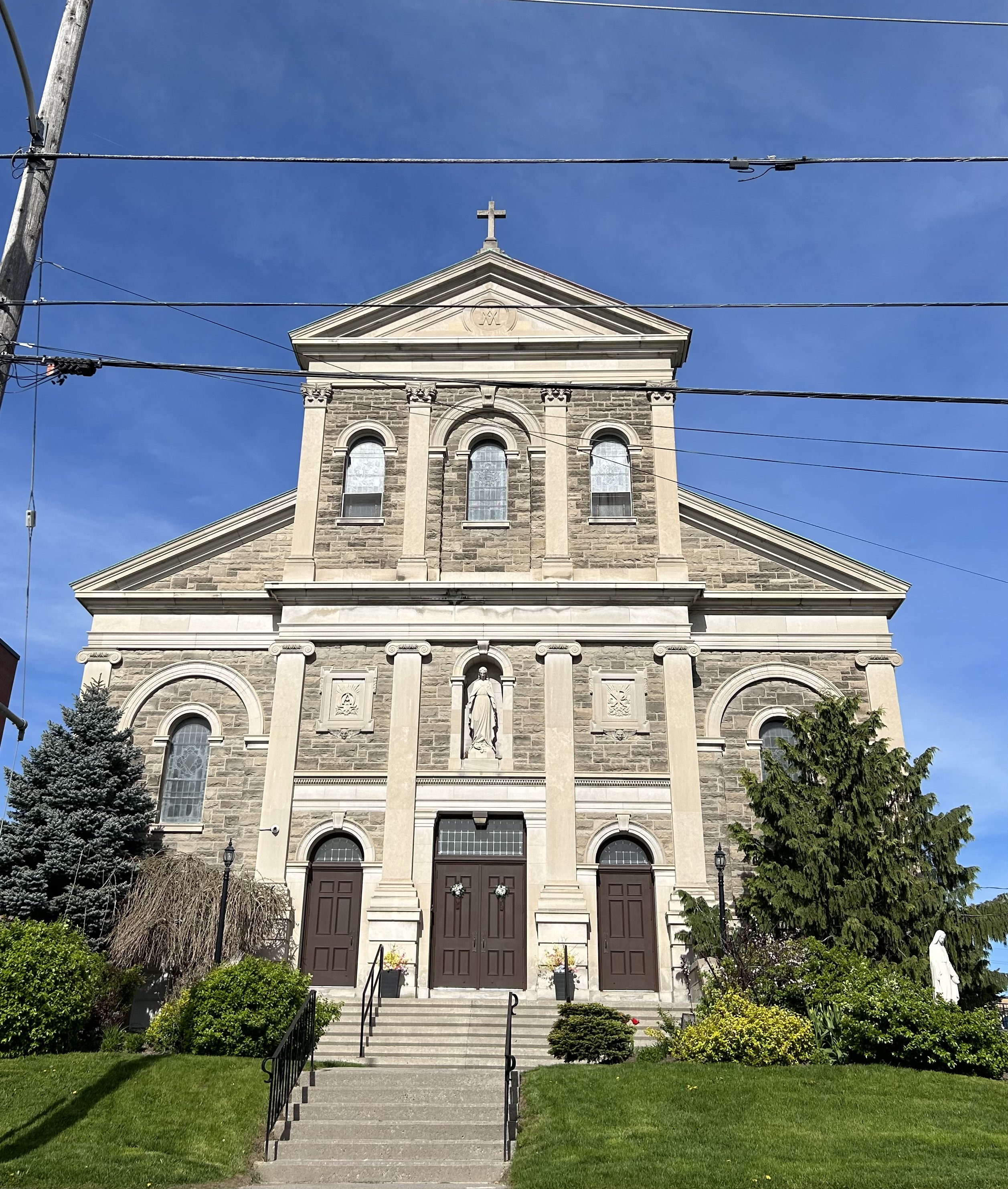
- The church in May 2024
- Immaculate Conception Church
- 44°18′20.451″N 78°18′30.513″W
- Location: 386 Rogers Street; Peterborough, Ontario; K9H 1W7
- Language(s): English; Polish
- Denomination: Roman Catholic
- Website: www.immaculatepeterborough.ca

History
- Dedication: Mary, Mother of God, under her title of Immaculate Conception

Architecture
- Architect: Arthur W. Holmes
- Architectural type: Neoclassical
- Groundbreaking: 1914
- Completed: 1930

Administration
- Archdiocese: Kingston
- Diocese: Peterborough

Clergy
- Priest: The Rev. Fr. Jozef Vano

Immaculate Conception Church is a Roman Catholic parish church in Peterborough, Ontario, Canada. It is located at 386 Rogers Street in the city's East City neighbourhood. It was the third parish church established in Peterborough. The Neoclassical building was designed by Arthur W. Holmes and completed in 1930.

== History ==
In 1914, to serve the rising population of the former Village of Ashburnham, Bishop M. J. O’Brien established the parish. A site beside the existing St. Joseph's Hospital and House of Providence was chosen and the basement of the church was completed and consecrated on December 6, 1914. In 1930, Bishop Denis O'Connor ordered the construction of the rest of the church which had been on hold since the outbreak of the First World War. The Neoclassical building was designed by Arthur W. Holmes was completed and solemnly blessed on December 8, 1933. A major restoration was undertaken in 1998. Accessibility to the church was improved in 2019.

In 2005, the care of the church became entrusted to the Franciscans under the leadership of Fr. Jerzy Żebrowski. Fr. Żebrowski began offering services in Polish.

A fire on May 27, 2026, caused minor damage.
