= Holy Rosary Church (Toronto) =

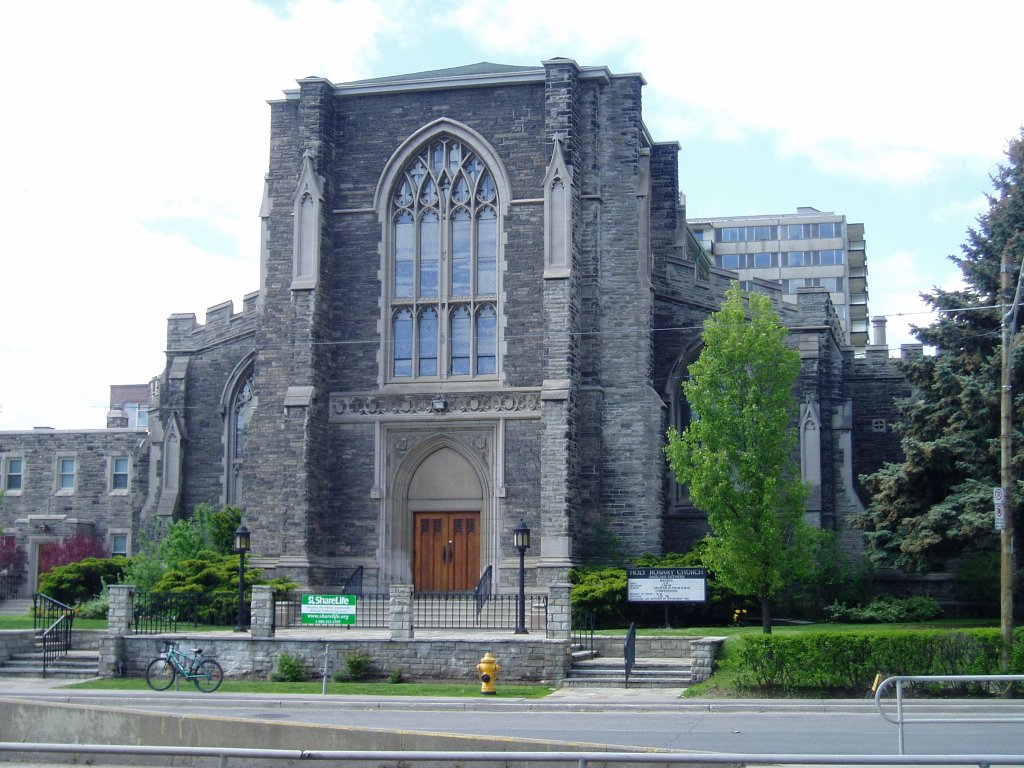
- Holy Rosary Church
- 43.684497°N 79.413898°W
- Location: 354 St. Clair Avenue West; Toronto, Ontario
- Denomination: Roman Catholic
- Website: holyrosary.ca

History
- Dedication: Our Lady of the Most Holy Rosary

Architecture
- Architect: Arthur William Holmes
- Style: Gothic Revival
- Years built: 1926–1927

Administration
- Archdiocese: Toronto

Clergy
- Pastor: The Rev. Fr. Peter Turrone

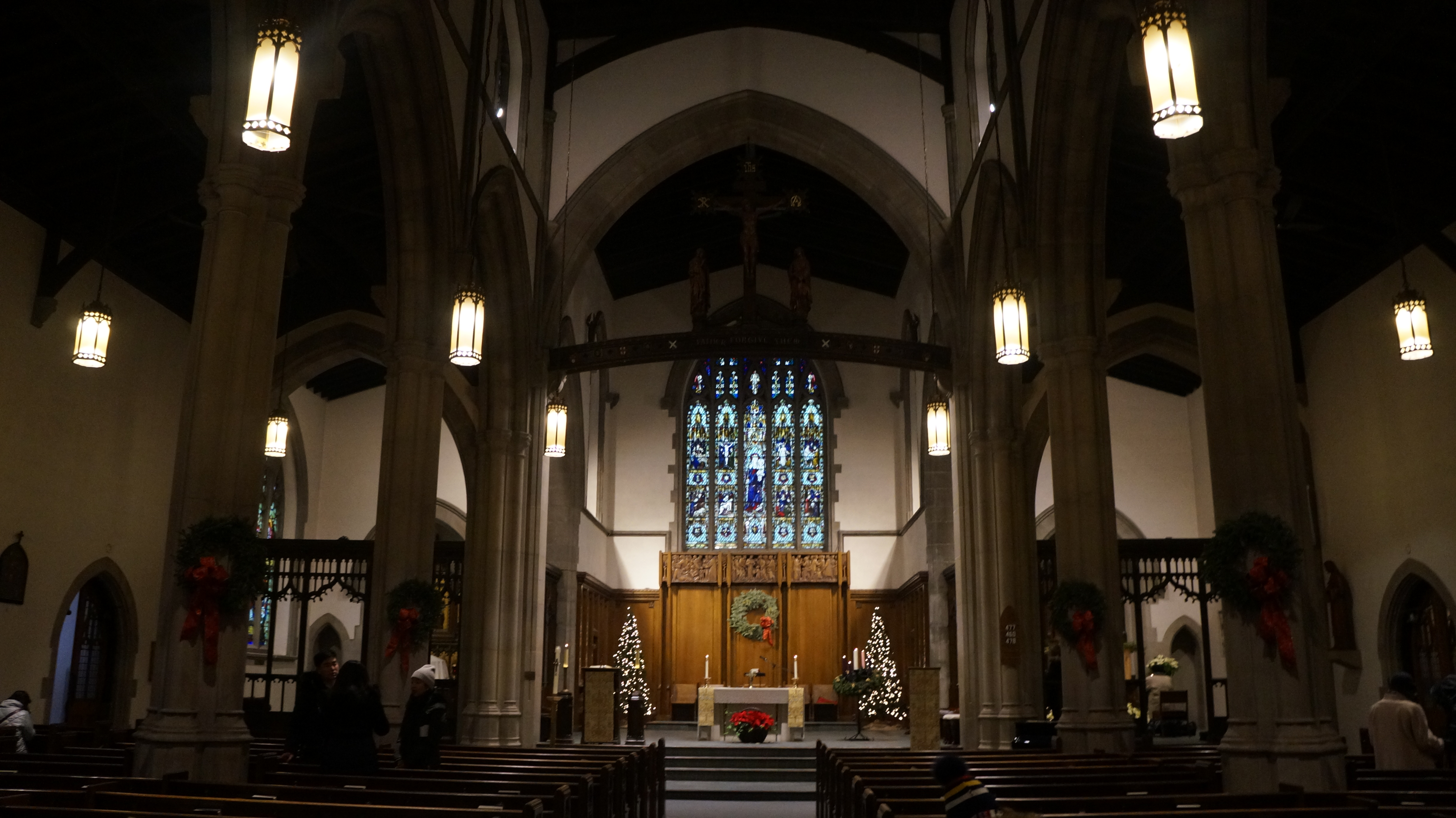
Interior

Holy Rosary Church is a Roman Catholic church in Forest Hill, Toronto, Ontario.

== History ==
In 1882, Basilian Fr. Lawrence Brennan, parish priest of St. Basil's Church, purchased 50-acres of what was then remote farmland on St. Clair Avenue West. The land was intended to be a farm for St. Michael's College and Fr. Brennan constructed a novitiate to train priests. On May 8, 1892, the cornerstone was laid for the novitiate and a chapel to serve as a parish church for the Irish population in the area. The parish was established in 1909.

The parish grew rapidly and in 1924 Fr. Michael Oliver was appointed priest and instructed to oversee the construction of a new church. Archbishop Neil McNeil laid the cornerstone for the new church on May 30, 1926. Fr. Oliver admired English Gothic churches and modeled the new Holy Rosary Church after St. Mary's Church in St. Neots, Huntingdonshire. The church was designed by prominent Toronto-based Catholic architect Arthur William Holmes. Construction cost $150,000. The new church was blessed and opened on May 8, 1927.

The first stained glass windows were dedicated in 1928 in memory of John Franklin Brown Jr., a parishioner who died in the First World War. Another memorial window was dedicated in 1945.

== See also ==
- List of Roman Catholic churches in Toronto
