= Alfredas Kulpa-Kulpavičius =

Lithuanian architect and artist

Alfredas Kulpa-Kulpavičius (March 28, 1923 – May 16, 2007) was a Lithuanian architect and artist best known for his work on Canadian churches.

== Biography ==
Kulpa-Kulpavičius was born in Baisogala. Between 1941 and 1943, he studied at Vytautas Magnus University and from 1942 to 1943 at the Kaunas Institute of Applied Arts. In 1944, he fled to Germany and studied at Leibniz University Hannover from 1946 to 1948, and the Darmstadt Technical University from 1948 to 1952. Beginning in 1952, he lived in Canada, where he established his architectural company in Toronto.

Kulpa-Kulpavičius was responsible for work on many buildings, many of them churches. These include Our Lady's Church, Montreal (1952), St. St. Casimir's Church, Winnipeg and St. Gregory's Church, Toronto (1959), Lithuanian Martyrs' Church, Mississauga, Providence of God Church and Cultural Center, Detroit and St. Thomas Church, London (1978), Corporation Canadien Tire Building, Toronto (1979) etc. He was also the creator of small-scale architectural structures such as crosses and tombstones and built a collection of Canadian Inuit stone sculptures.

He returned to Lithuania in 2006.
