= Church of the Holy Name, Toronto =

Church of the Holy Name
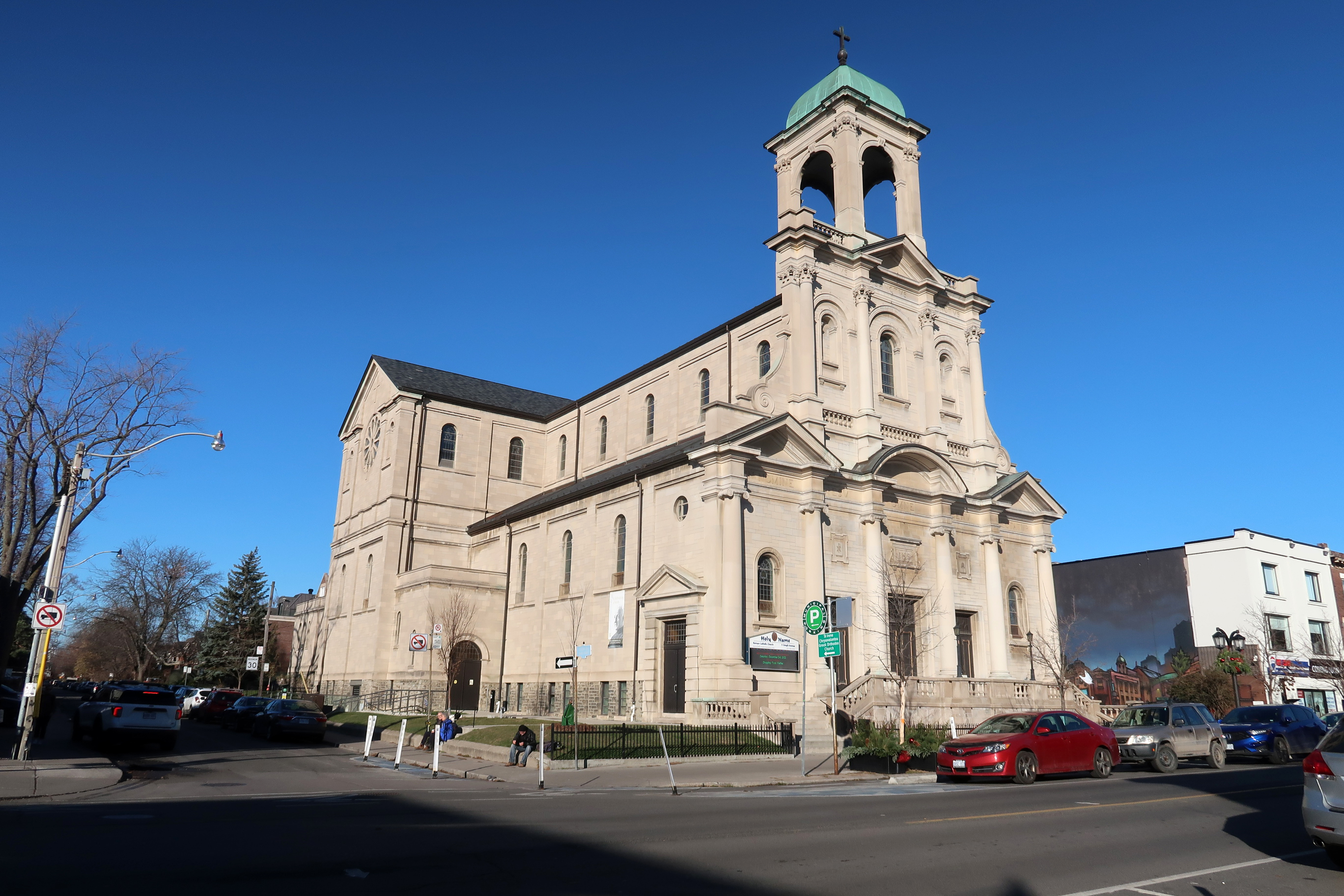
- Church of the Holy Name
- 43°40′44″N 79°20′45″W
- Location: 71 Gough Avenue; Toronto, Ontario; M4K 3N9
- Denomination: Roman Catholic
- Website: holynameto.archtoronto.org

Architecture
- Architect: Arthur W. Holmes
- Years built: 1913-1926

Administration
- Archdiocese: Toronto

The Church of the Holy Name in Toronto, Ontario, Canada is a historic church built during 1913 to 1926. The church was designed by architect Arthur W. Holmes to resemble the Basilica di Santa Maria Maggiore in Rome. It is asserted to be "unchallenged as the Danforth's most impressive architectural landmark."

The Church of the Holy Name is located on The Danforth, slightly west of Pape Avenue. Historically, Danforth Avenue started off as a sleepy byway, with large stretches of open fields. The dirt road became dusty in the summer and muddy during wet weather. Over time the Danforth streetscape evolved to consist of scattered houses, the occasional church, most notably Church of the Holy Name, and the occasional hotel.

The Church of the Holy Name has remained an architectural landmark along Danforth Avenue.
