= Arthur W. Holmes =

Canadian church architect

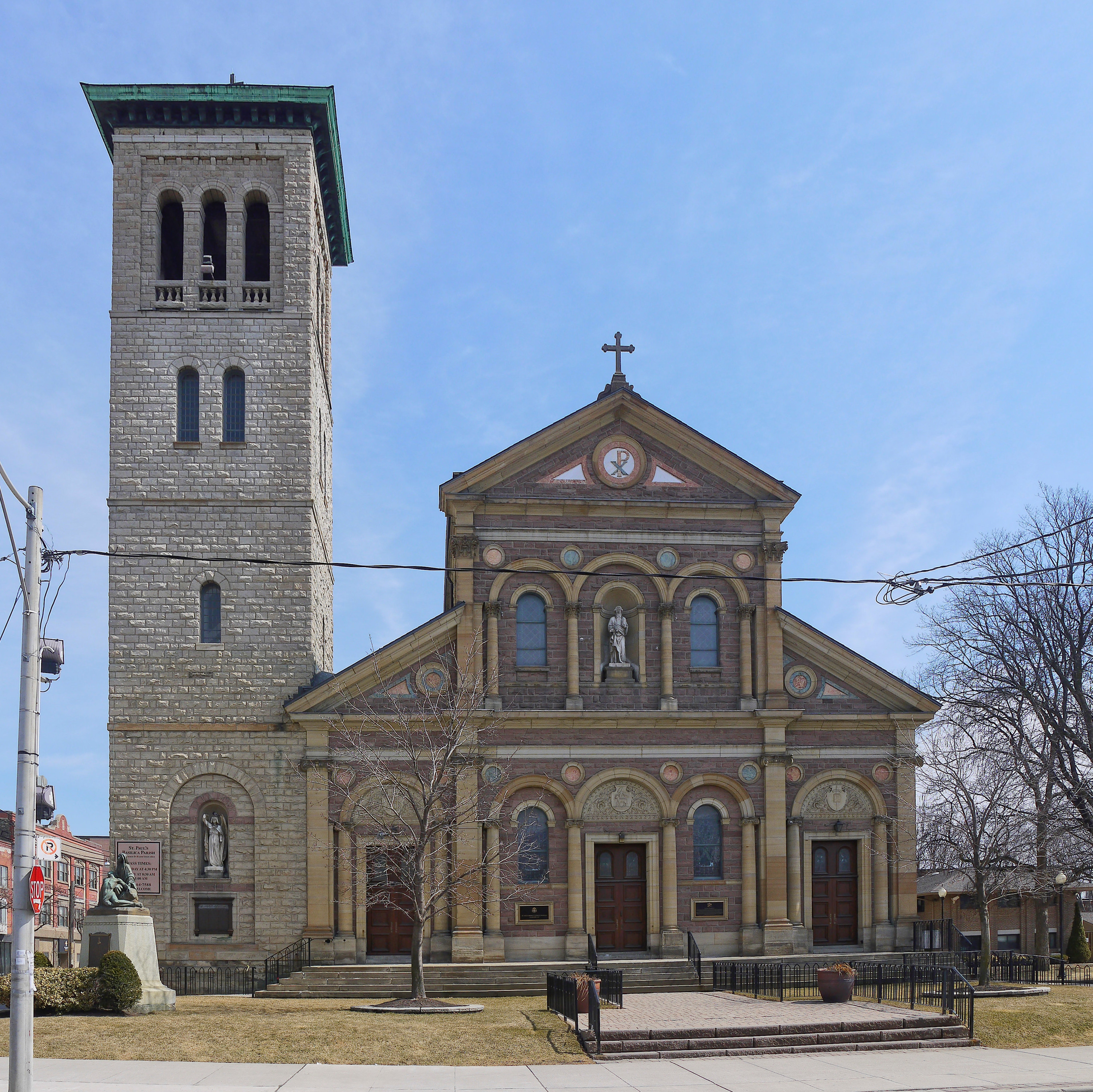
St. Paul's, Toronto

Arthur William Holmes (1863–1944) was an architect who designed numerous buildings, particularly churches, in Toronto and other places in Ontario during the late nineteenth and early twentieth century.

== Biography ==
He was born in London, England, and before he left for Canada in 1885, he trained under the supervision of George Edmund Street.

From 1887 to 1891 he worked as a student and assistant for Joseph Connolly. At some point during his first years in Toronto he converted to become a Roman Catholic. From then on, most of his work was the designing and construction of Roman Catholic churches, schools, colleges and residences.

From 1898, he worked almost exclusively on Roman Catholic parish churches. After Joseph Connolly died in 1904, Holmes completed the bell tower on St. Paul's in Toronto. Demand for Holmes as an architect increased so he hired an assistant, Charles Read, to help him with his work.

Much of work shows considerable emulation of Catholic churches in Europe. From 1910 to 1913, he worked on St. Augustine's Seminary in Scarborough, Ontario, which show the influence of the Cattedrale di Santa Maria del Fiore in Florence. He used the refectory of Queen's College, Oxford as the model for the college chapel. In 1914, he designed the Church of the Holy Name in Toronto and drew heavily on the Church of the Gesù in Rome. From 1926 to 1927 he worked on St. Thomas Aquinas Church, next to the Newman Centre on the St. George Campus of the University of Toronto. Later, he used the Gothic Revival architecture style more often, such as the Teefy and Brennan Halls of St. Michael's College, Toronto which was built in 1936.

He died in Toronto on 15 March 1944 and was buried in Mount Hope Catholic Cemetery. His wife, Madeleine Kormann Holmes, predeceased him.

== Works ==
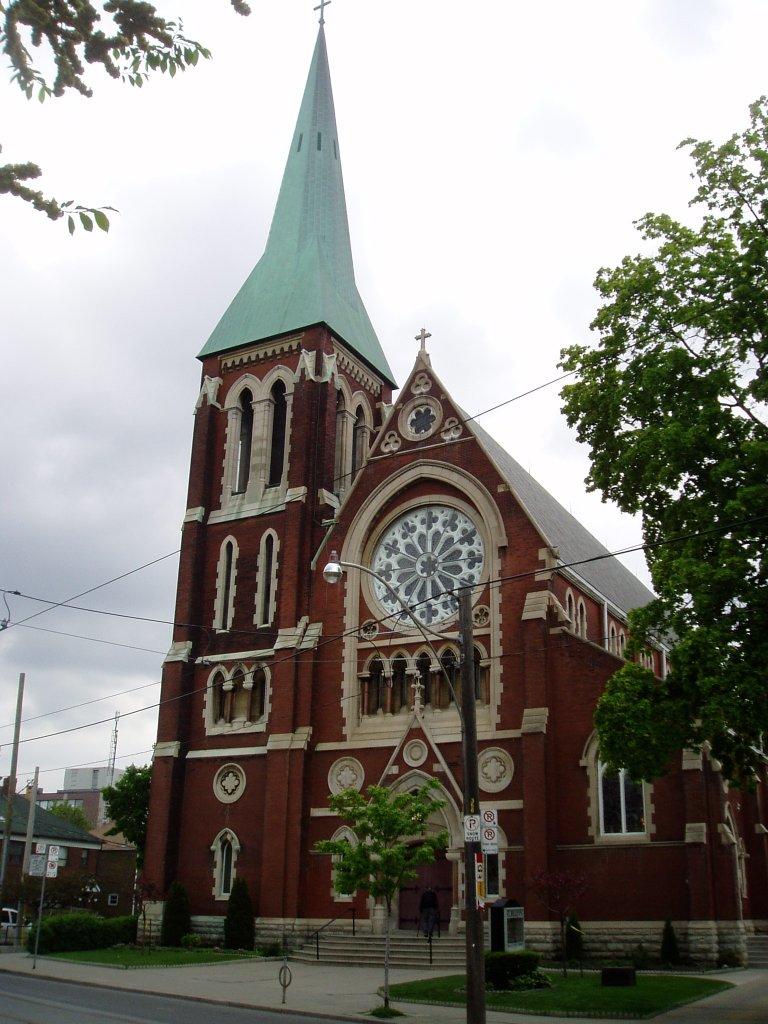
St. Helen's Catholic Church, Toronto

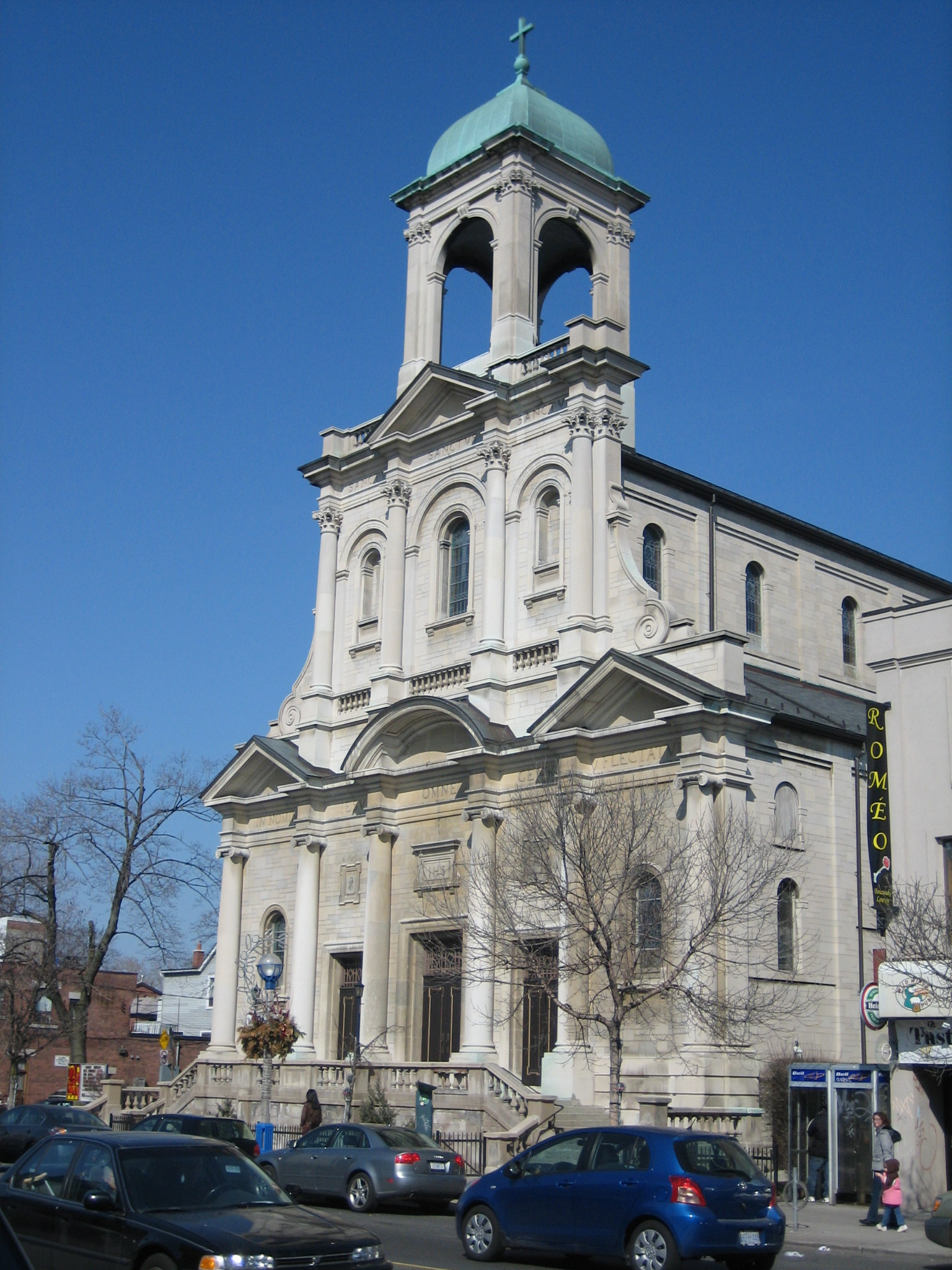
Church of the Holy Name, Toronto

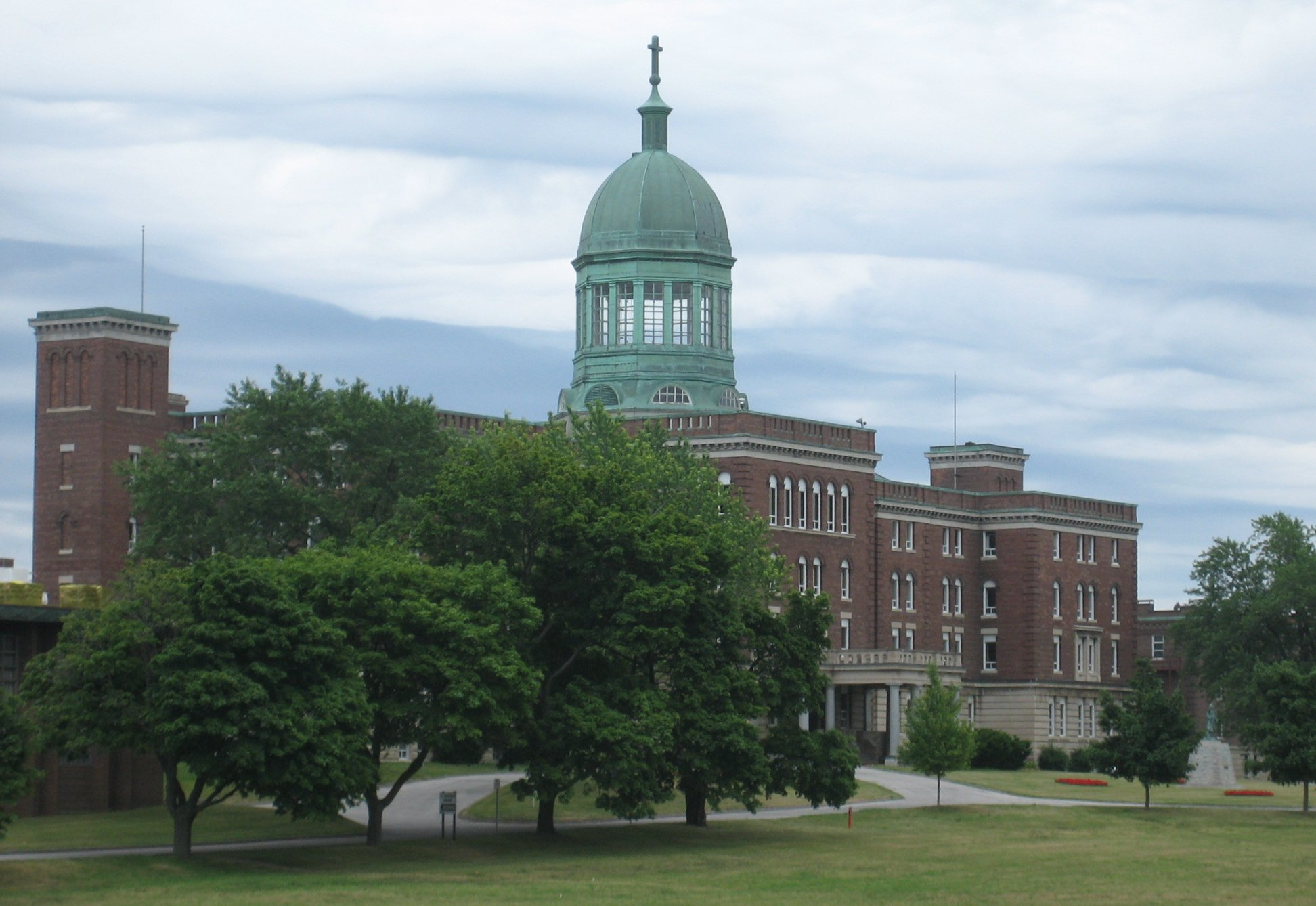
St. Augustine's Seminary

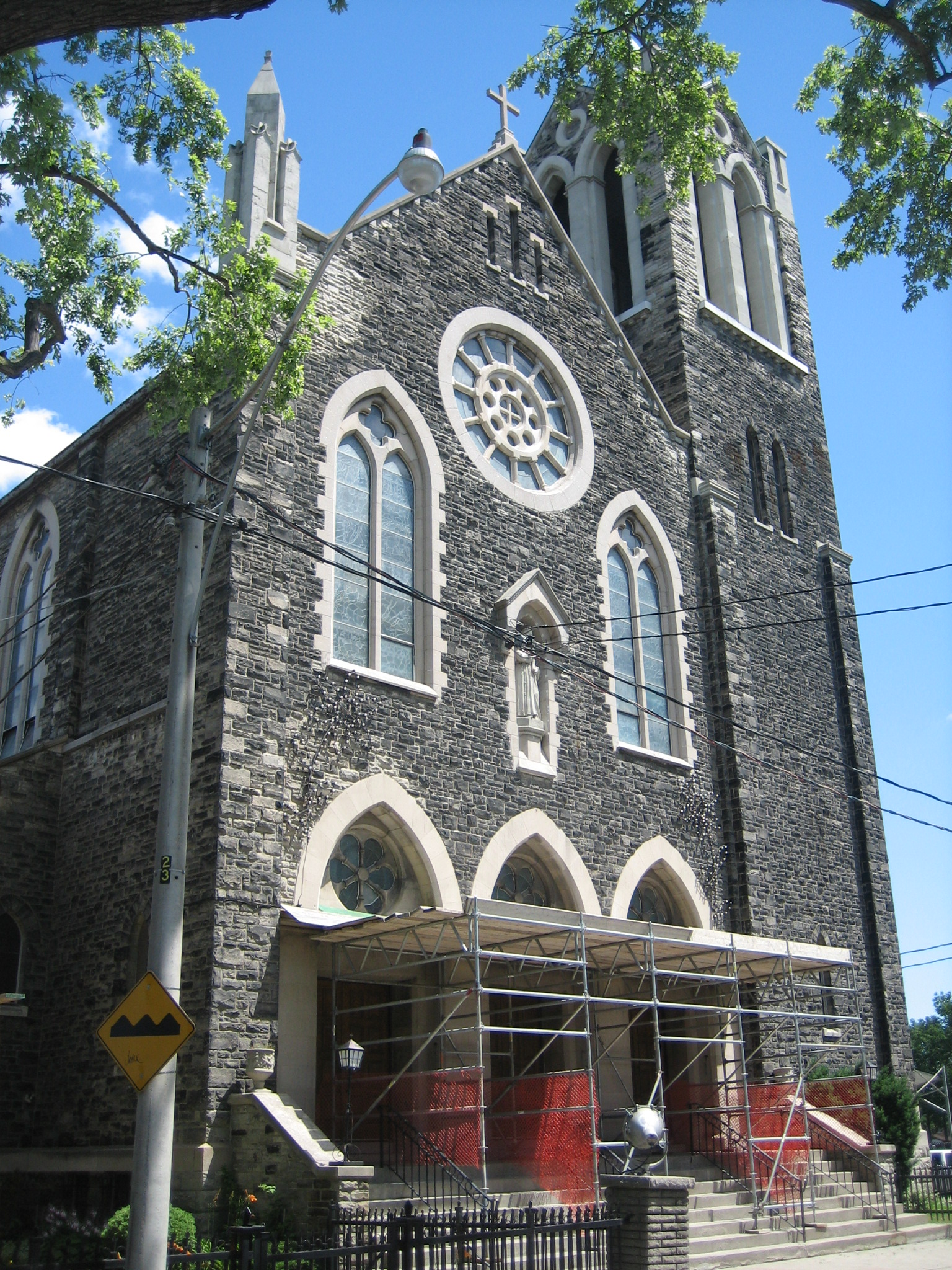
St. Francis of Assisi, Toronto

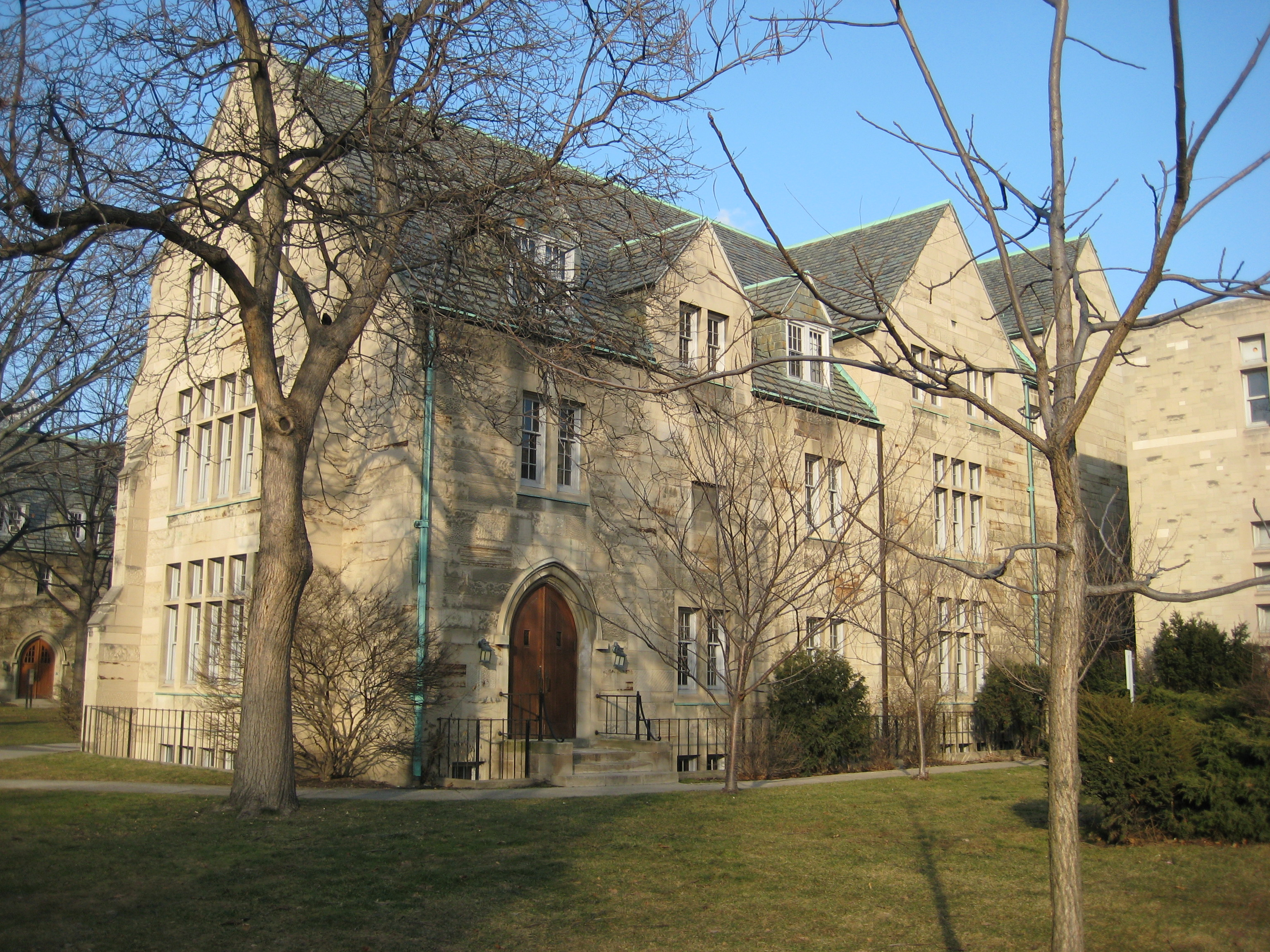
St. Michael's College, Toronto

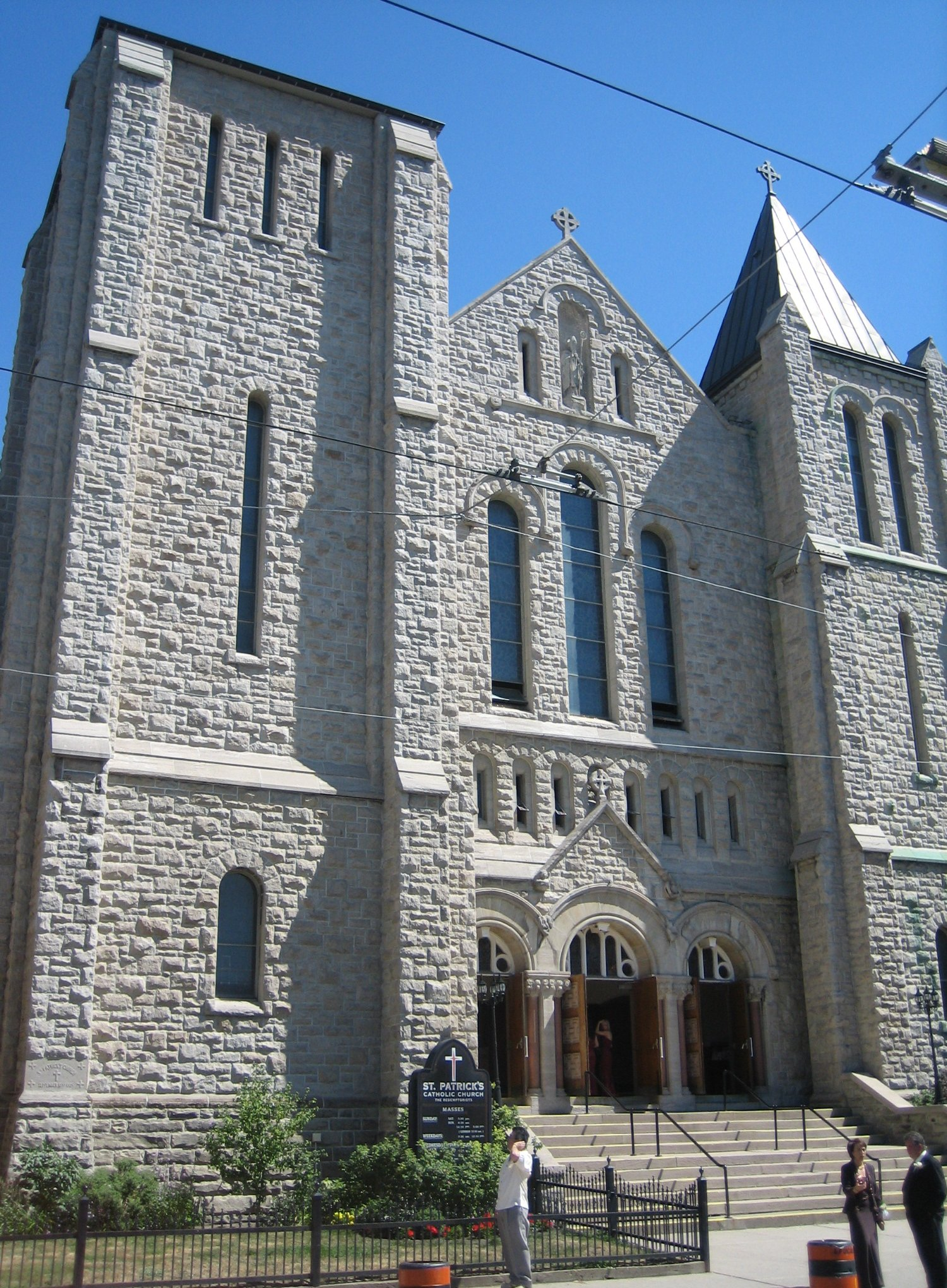
St. Patrick's Church, Toronto

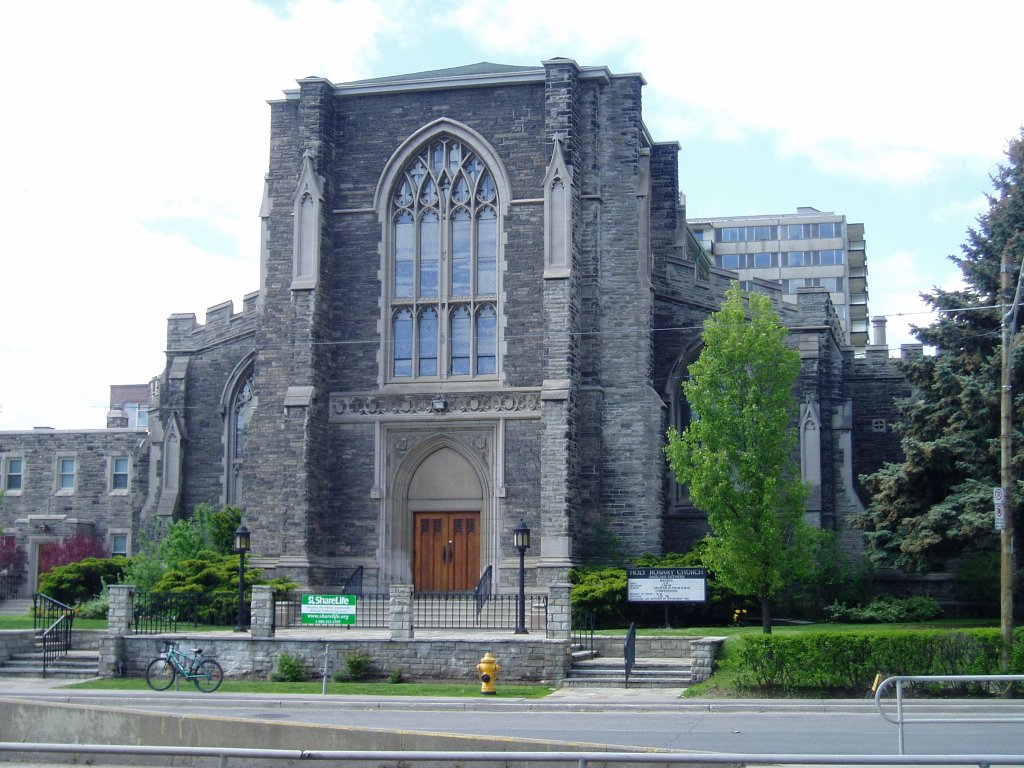
Holy Rosary Church, Toronto

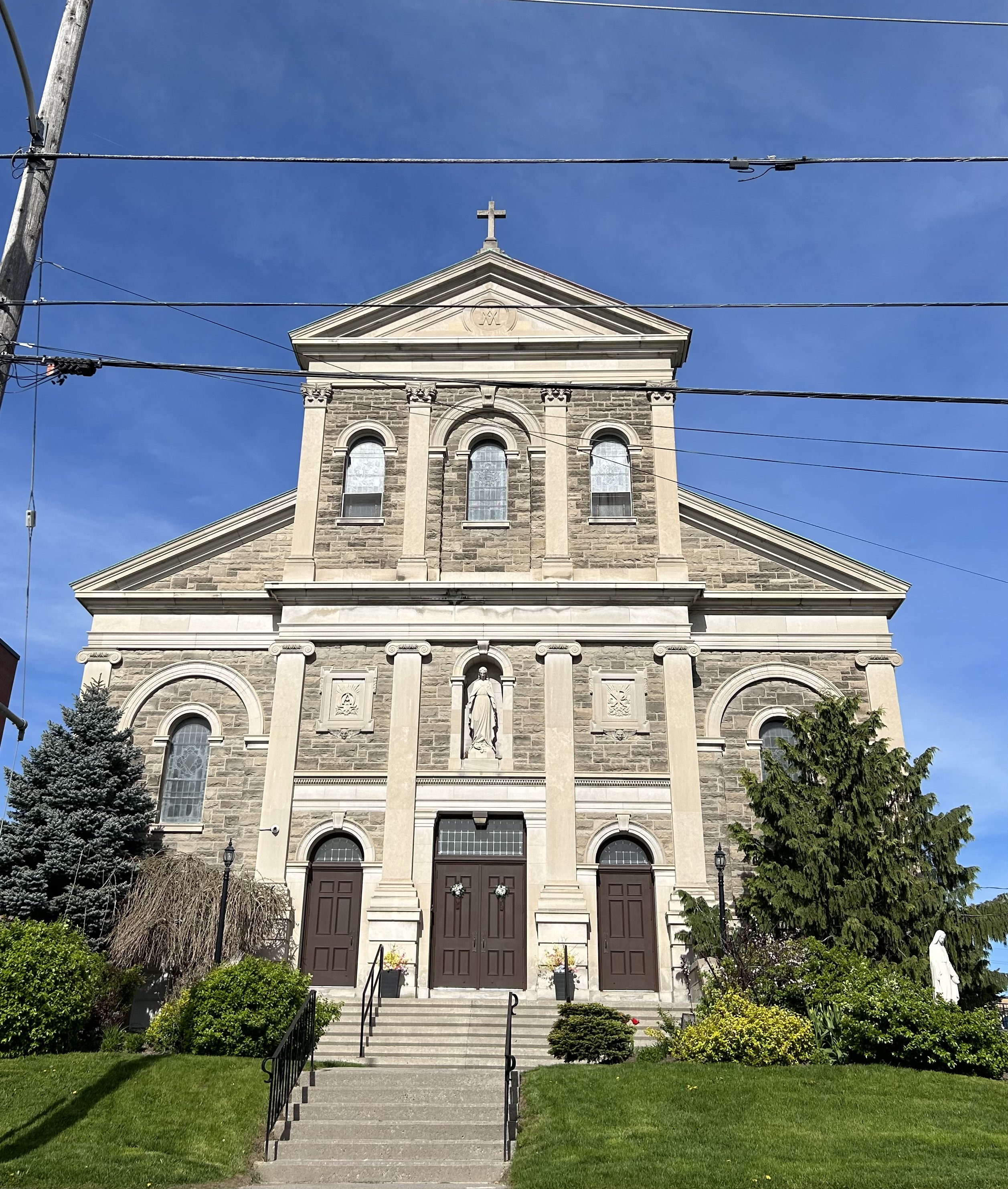
Immaculate Conception Church, Peterborough

== See also ==
- Joseph Connolly
