= St. Francis of Assisi (Toronto) =

Coordinates: 43.65351°N 79.41449°W

Church of St. Francis of Assisi
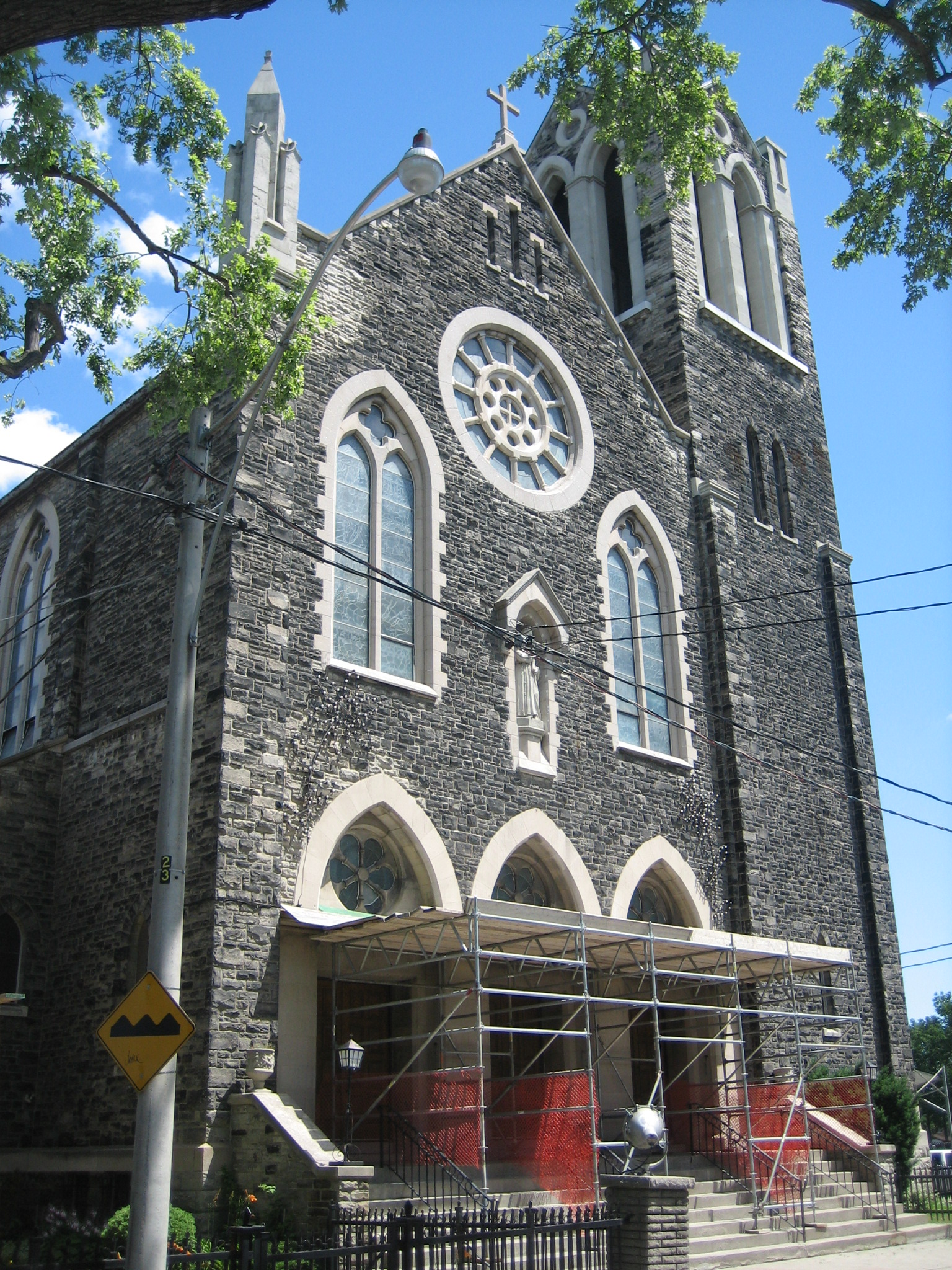
- Church Undergoing Restoration Work
- Church of St. Francis of Assisi
- Location: 101 Grace Street; Toronto, Ontario, Canada
- Denomination: Roman Catholic
- Website: http://www.stfrancis.ca/

History
- Status: Parish church
- Founded: 1902
- Dedication: Saint Francis of Assisi

Architecture
- Architect: Arthur W. Holmes
- Style: Gothic Revival
- Years built: 1914-1915
- Groundbreaking: September 14, 1914
- Completed: October 31, 1915

Administration
- Diocese: Archdiocese of Toronto

Clergy
- Priest(s): Rev. Ricardo Mendoza, FM (Administrator)
- Pastor: Vacant

Saint Francis of Assisi is a Roman Catholic church founded in 1902 in Toronto, Ontario, Canada. It is located in the west end neighbourhood of Little Italy and Trinity-Bellwoods and within the Roman Catholic Archdiocese of Toronto.

== History ==
The original church and parish community of St. Francis of Assisi was established in 1902 on the corner of Dundas and Grace Street.

During the construction of the original church, Mass was celebrated in 1902 and the first part of 1903 at St. Francis of Assisi Separate School located at the time on Manning Avenue. The architect of the building was Charles J. Read who designed the church in a modern gothic style at a cost of $20,000. The church was opened and blessed by Archbishop O'Connor on Sunday, June 7, 1903.

The first Pastor of St. Francis was Fr. William Alfred McCann, made a Prelate of Honour of His Holiness Pope Pius XI on September 29, 1935.

Due to the rapid development of the surrounding area, in 1910 it was decided a new and larger church was to be constructed. A total of 10 houses where purchased and demolished to make way for the new church. The architect appointed to design the new church was Arthur William Holmes. Holmes designed numerous churches and buildings for the Archdiocese of Toronto including St. Augustine's Seminary.

After four years of planning and securing the site, building began on an imposing roman gothic stone structure measuring 158 feet long by 57 feet wide including transepts. The cornerstone of the new St. Francis Church was laid on September 14, 1914 by Archbishop McNeil.

The church itself was completed at a cost of $115,000 and was blessed by Archbishop McNeil on October 31, 1915. The parish hall was opened on November 3, with a concert put on by St. Francis' Glee Club.

The exterior of the church is built from a combination of locally quarried Credit Valley gray sandstone and so-called Roman stone, a manufactured, fictive stone created from a concrete mixture which was poured into sand moulds. The technology for creating such fictive limestone was relatively new, but by 1910 it was being used extensively as a substitute for quarried stone.

The interior paint scheme was restored in 2018 to a monochromatic paint scheme from 1945 to allow the colours from the stained glass windows to be magnified within the Nave. The decoration intensifies in the transepts and into the sanctuary to emphasize the importance of that sacred space and the beauty of the East stained glass window, depicting the Crucifixion of Christ. The entire sanctuary area was restored to its original design with the reconstruction of Holmes' ambulatory screen as the backdrop of the altar.

Two Guido Nincheri frescos depicting Christ in the Garden of Gethsemane and the Entombment of Christ were unveiled and restored along with all the East wall artwork. The restoration of the coffered ceiling artwork over the sanctuary was donated by a parishioner of the Italian community in memory of his late wife.

A point of distinction are the rather large clerestory stained glass windows. There are a total of twenty-one stained glass windows in the church. Sixteen windows where executed by N. T. Lyon Glass Co. Limited of Toronto, one window depicting the Empty Tomb by Robert McCausland Limited and four windows depicting scenes from the life of St. Francis by the studios of George Boos of Munich, Germany. The George Boos windows where commissioned before the outbreak of the First World War but not delivered and installed until sometime after the war.

== Pipe organ ==
The church has a pipe organ made in 1914 by the Canadian Pipe Organ Company Ltd. very much in the style of Casavant organs of that time. This organ includes some innovations such as brass pipe lips and thin-walled lead principals.

== Pastors ==
1) Msgr. William Alfred McCann, 1903-1950

2) Fr. Daniel J. O’Neil, 1950-1957

3) Fr. George Nincheri O.S.M., 1957-1968

4) Fr. Ambrose De Luca O.F.M., 1968-1970

5) Fr. Arthur Lattanzi O.F.M., 1970-1976

6) Fr. Januarius M. Izzo, O.F.M., 1976-1979

7) Fr. Primo Piscitello, O.F.M., 1979-1982

8) Fr. Angelo Bucciero, O.F.M., 1982-1990

9) Fr. Frederick Mazzarella, O.F.M., 1990-1992

10) Fr. Gregory Botte, O.F.M., 1992-2012

11) Fr. Jimmy Zammit, O.F.M., 2012-2019

12) Fr. Francis Walter O.F.M, 2019-2022

13) Fr. Massimo Buttigieg, 2022-2025
