= St. Patrick's Church (Toronto) =

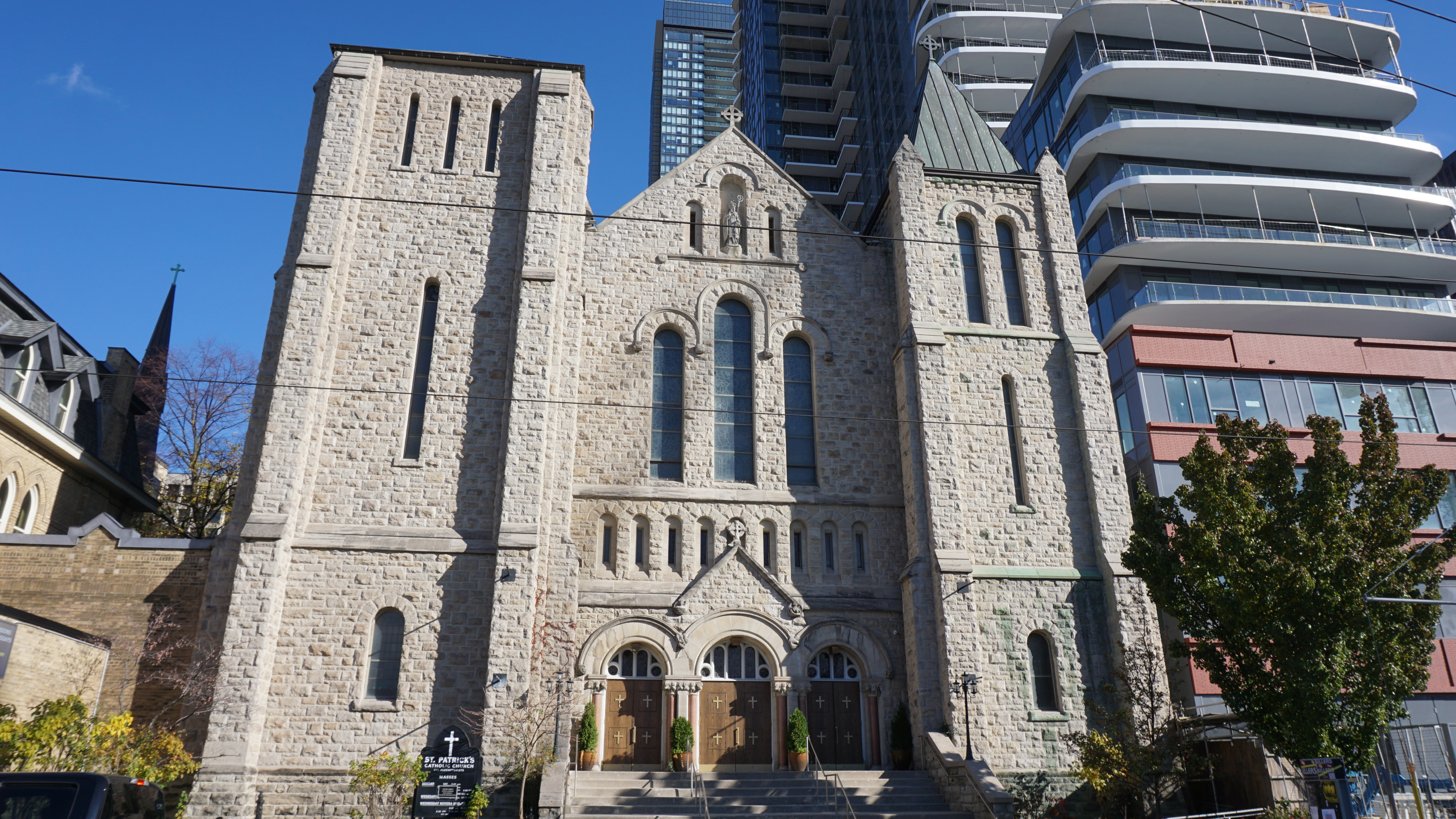

- Location of St. Patrick's Church in Toronto
- 43.654685°N 79.391332°W
- Location: 131 McCaul Street; Toronto, Ontario, Canada; M5T 1W3
- Denomination: Roman Catholic
- Website: www.stpatrickstoronto.ca

History
- Dedication: St. Patrick

Architecture
- Architect: A.W. Holmes
- Style: Romanesque Revival
- Completed: 1908

Administration
- Archdiocese: Toronto

Clergy
- Pastor(s): Rev. Thomas O'Rourke, C.Ss.R

St. Patrick's Roman Catholic Church on McCaul Street in Toronto, Ontario, Canada, is the church for the city's fifth oldest Roman Catholic parish. St. Patrick subway station nearby and the adjacent St. Patrick Street were named after the church. St. Patrick's is the home of the Canadian National Shrine of Our Mother of Perpetual Help.

== History ==
The parish was reportedly established in 1861 and had its own church in 1908, although evidence of baptismal records date back to at least to February 4, 1858 upon the baptism of John Dogerty [Dougherty], son of Bernard Dogerty [Dougherty] and his wife Mary Ann McConnell. The Romanesque Revival church was designed by architect Arthur W. Holmes.

== St. Patrick's Gregorian Schola ==
The St. Patrick's Gregorian Choir was established on October 28, 2006 at St. Patrick's Church for the Saturday 5:00 p.m. Holy Mass, under director, organist, pianist, and composer Surinder S. Mundra. One of the first choirs in the Toronto region specializing in Gregorian chant in its proper liturgical context. The aim of the choir from its beginning is to promote through the chant, a deep love and reverence towards the Sacrifice of Holy Mass. In addition to serving their regular function as resident choir for the Saturday Masses, they have organized regular Christmas Organ Fundraising concerts held yearly in the church, and have sung at celebrations of Tridentine Mass at many other churches.

== Gallery ==
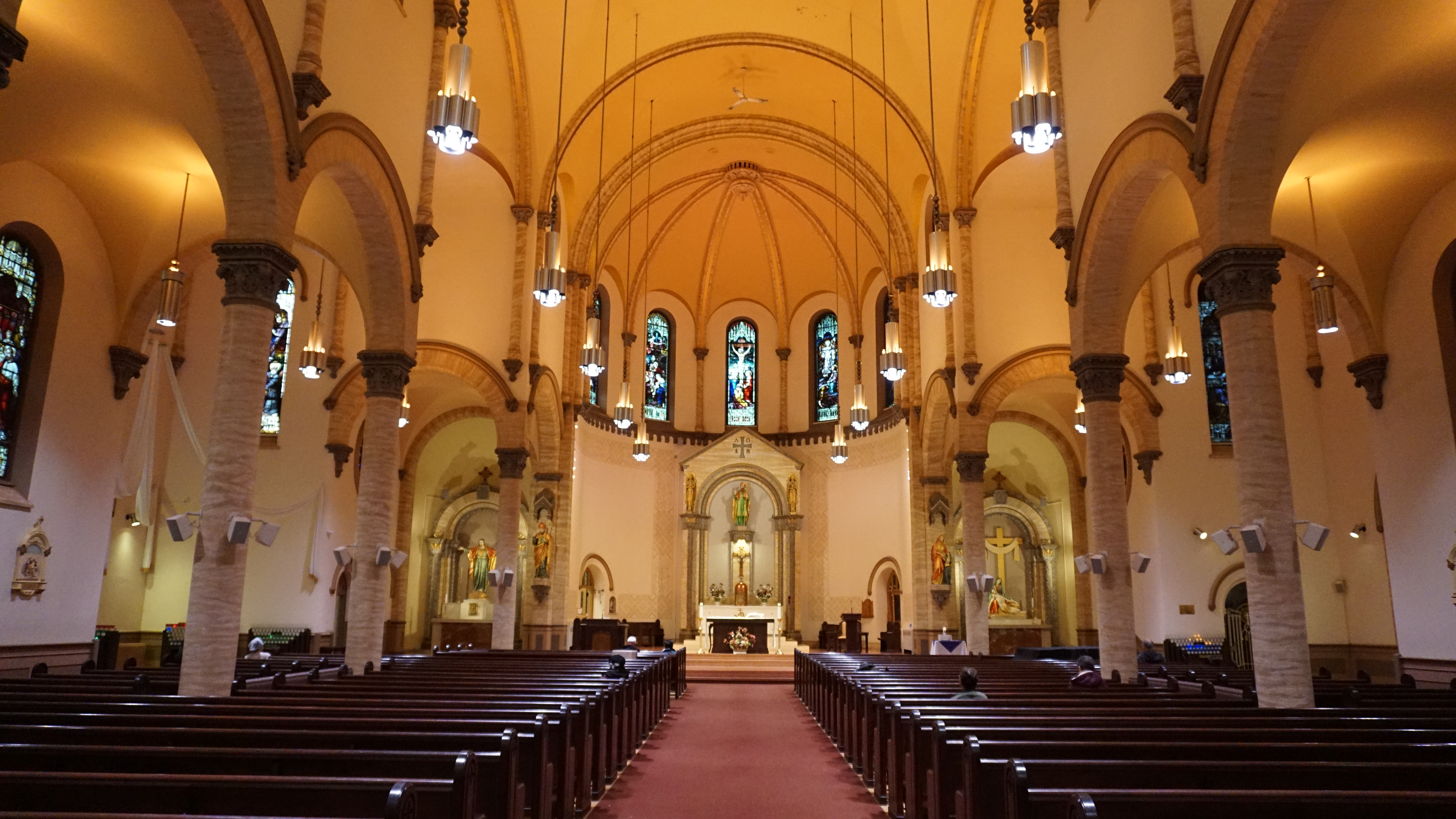
Interior

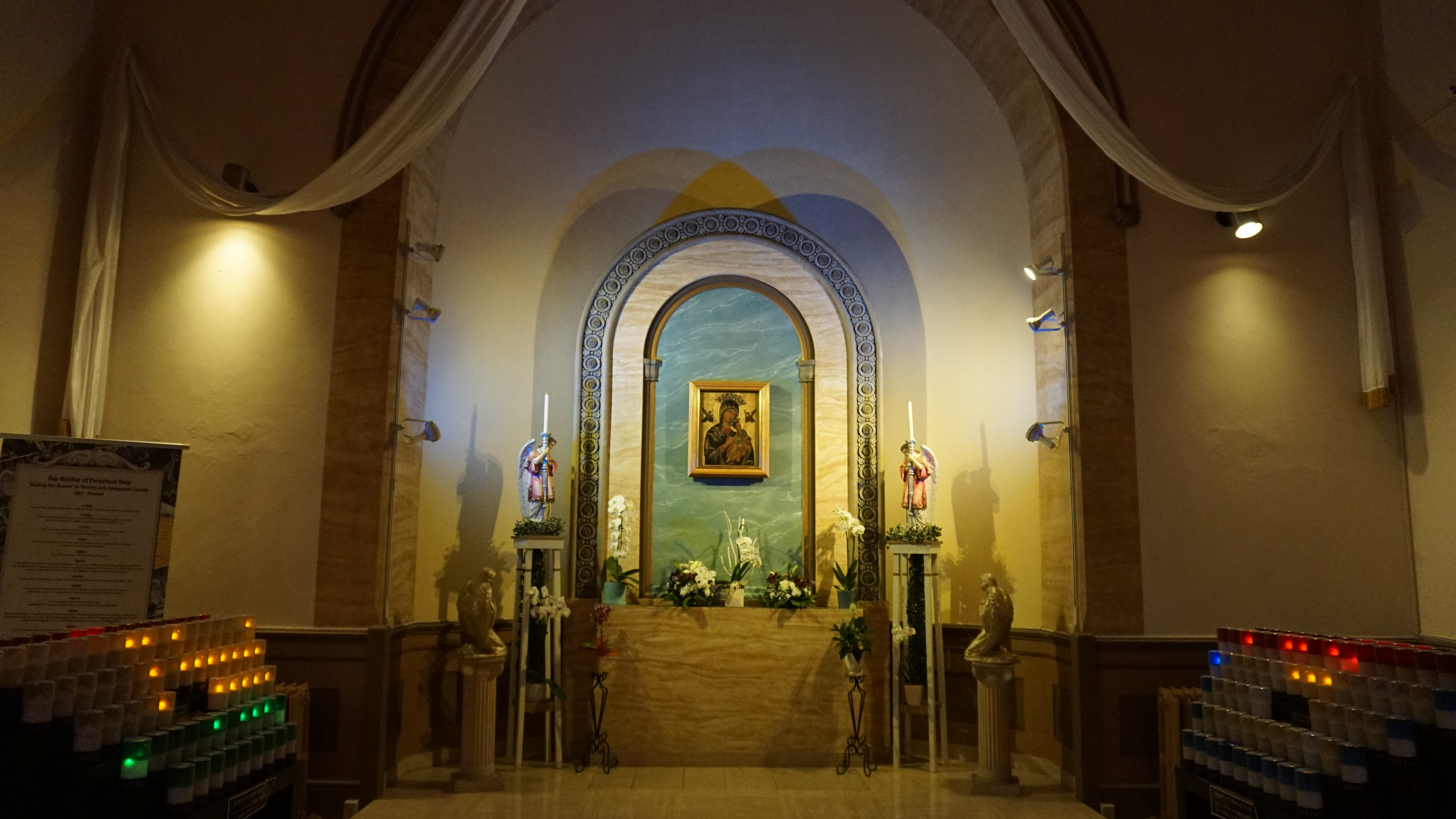
National Shrine of Our Mother of Perpetual Help

== See also ==
- Congregation of the Most Holy Redeemer
