= Jacob Barit =

Russian Rabbi

Jakob Barit
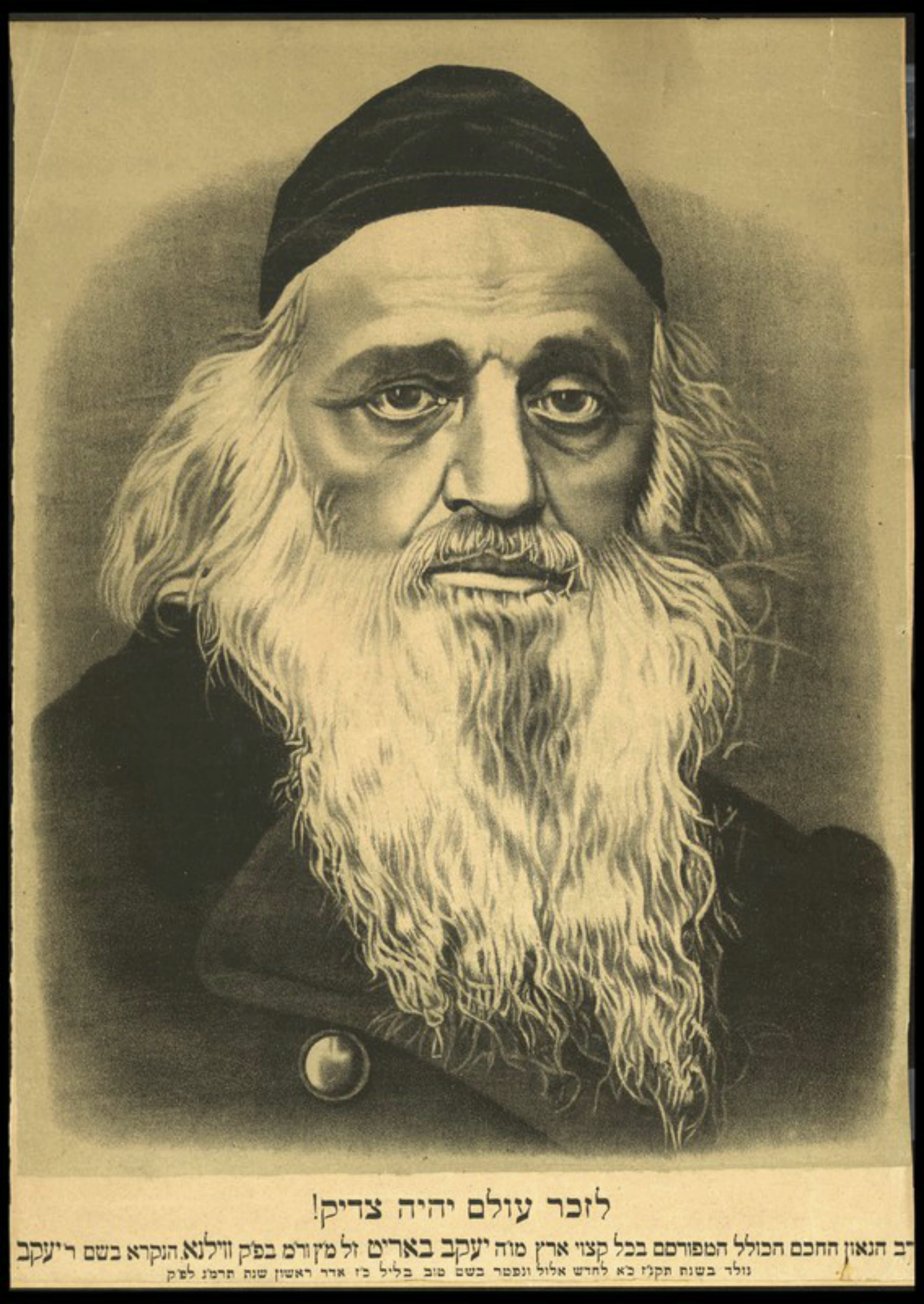

Personal life
- Born: 12 September 1797 Simno, New East Prussia, Prussia
- Died: 6 March 1883 (aged 85) Vilna, Russia

Religious life
- Religion: Judaism

Jakob Barit, also known as Rabbi Yaakov Brit or Yankele Kovner (12 September 1797 – 6 March 1883) was a Russian Rabbi and communal worker. He died in Vilna at the age of 85.

== Biography ==
Barit lost his parents early in life and at the age of fourteen came to the city of Kovno, where he studied Talmud in the bet ha-midrash of the suburb Slobodka. At the age of eighteen, he married the daughter of a wealthy relative, and with the financial assistance of that relative, he continued his Talmudic studies for another six years, when his wife died and he removed to Vilna. There he entered the bet hamidrash of Rabbi Hayyim Nachman Parnes, at the same time studying modern languages and sciences; and he soon acquired a fair knowledge of Russian, German, French, algebra, and astronomy. Like many of the Russo-Jewish scholars of that time, he started a whisky distillery business, and with his versatility and energy made quite a success of it. But unfortunately, private distilleries in cities were prohibited by the Russian government by the law of 1845, and as a consequence Barit was financially ruined.

When Sir Moses Montefiore visited Vilna in 1846, he spent considerable time in Barit's house, and was guided by his advice as to the form of the petition to Emperor Nicholas I, on behalf of the oppressed Russian Jews.

In 1850, when Hayyim Parnes established a yeshiva for the education of rabbis, Barit was appointed principal (rosh-yeshibah), a position he held for twenty-five years until sickness forced him to resign. About twenty-five learned Talmudic students attended his lectures daily, and many of the eminent Russian rabbis and scholars were graduates of his yeshivah, such as Yisrael Meir Kagan and Eliyahu Shlomo of Lida. He was much admired for the logical and shrewd style of his lectures, which differed much from the scholastic and sophistic style of the Polish Talmudists of his time. While he refused to hold the office of a rabbi, he was for many years one of the dayyanim (judges) of the Vilna community.

== Authority as Delegate ==
Barit's chief merit, in addition to his work in these two posts, was his valuable services rendered to the Jews of Vilna and to those of all Russia in representing their interests before the Russian government. From 1849, when he was chosen as a delegate by the Jewish community of Vilna, he was always the representative speaker on behalf of that important community. In 1852, he was one of the delegates from Vilna to petition Czar Nicholas I in regard to the oppressive conscription duties of the Jews by the ukases of January 8, 1852 and of August 16, 1852. Barit was a man of great tact and political wisdom, a pleasant and impressive speaker, and conversationalist. In 1855, when a project was laid before the government to appoint chief rabbis in the capitals of the various governments of Russia, Vladimir Ivanovich Nazimov, then governor-general of Vilna, recommended Barit to be chief rabbi of the government of Vilna.

A Rabbinical Committee attached to the Ministry of the Interior had been established by the law of May 26, 1848, to consider questions involving the Jewish religion, but had rarely been called together. When the Committee was again summoned to St. Petersburg by the edict of May 25, 1857, Barit was appointed as one of the members and acted as its chairman for the whole session of six months. He acted in the same capacity at the Rabbinical Conference of 1861, which lasted about five months. In both of these assemblies, Barit bravely defended the honor of his co-religionists against the calumnies of their enemies, and his arguments, coming from the heart, found their way into the hearts of the authorities, the judges of the Jewish question.

In 1862, he was one of the delegates that were elected by the Jewish communities to congratulate Emperor Alexander II at the one thousandth anniversary of the foundation of the Russian Empire. In 1871, when Governor-General Kaufman called an assembly of specialists to investigate the accusations against the Jews made by Jacob Brafman (himself a baptized Jew) in his work Kniga Kahala. Barit was appointed member of the assembly and fully convinced the Christian members of the evil design and the unfounded and false character of Brafman's statements. The president of the assembly, Spasski, was so pleased with Barit's able and truthful defense of the Jews, that he paid him a visit and presented him with his photograph. Barit was appointed by the government as one of the inspectors of the Vilna City Hospital, and was of great help there to Abraham Lebensohn in rebuilding it, when it was in a dilapidated condition. He was also a useful member of the Vilna Talmud Torah, which made good progress by his aid to the president Jonah Gerstein.

In 1873, Barit had an attack of apoplexy, from which he never fully recovered. However, he continued his work in the yeshiva until 1877 when his malady finally prevented him from continuing. Although Barit was strictly orthodox, he was highly esteemed by the progressists, both Jewish and Christian. Governor-General Nazimov was his real friend, and when he left Vilna in 1863, and Barit came to take leave of him, Nazimov, in the presence of many members of the aristocracy, kissed Barit on the forehead, and afterward sent him his portrait as a memento of his friendship.
