= Simnas Lake =

Lake near Simnas town, Lithuania

Coordinates: 54°23′58″N 23°38′21″E

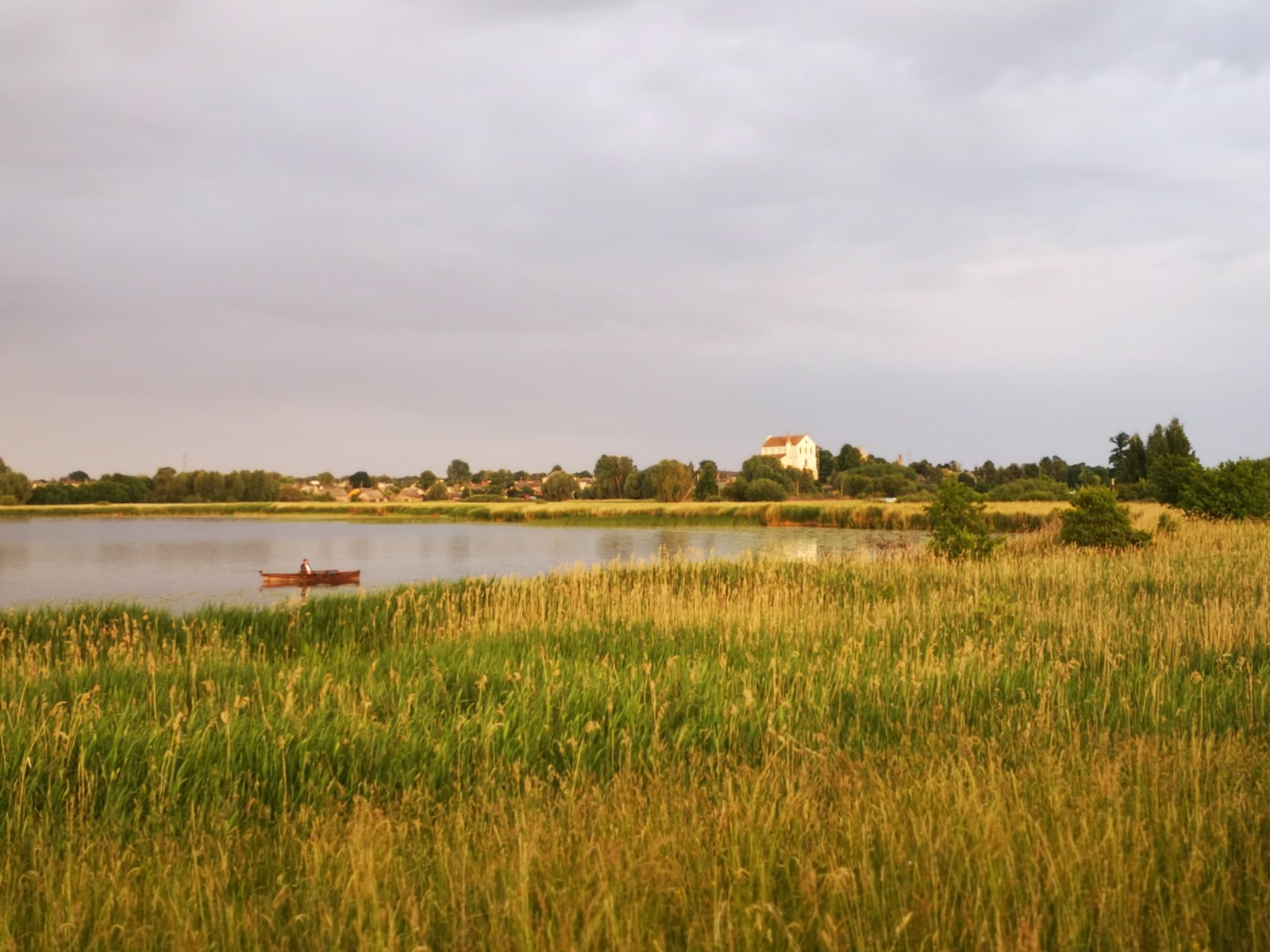
Simnas Lake and a church in a distance

Simnas Lake is a lake in Alytus County, Lithuania. It lies in the north of Simnas town. The lake is about 2.4 square kilometres (0.93 sq mi) in area, 2.8 kilometres (1.7 mi) length and 1.3 kilometres (0.81 mi) width. It is the 4th largest lake in Alytus county and 13th largest in South Lithuania. Depth average 2.3 metres (7 ft 7 in) with deepest place of 4.6 metres (15 ft). Lake was formed by melting glaciers. Water clarity is about 1 metre.

River Dovinė (Spernia) flows in from Dusia lake, Simnyčia river from Giluitis lake and two nameless streams. Flows out Bambena river to Žuvintas lake. In 1972 the dam was built on river Bambena which raised the lake's level. With river water loads of organic and biogenic material reach the lake, which leads to the lake's entropy - it is ageing fast and boggy.

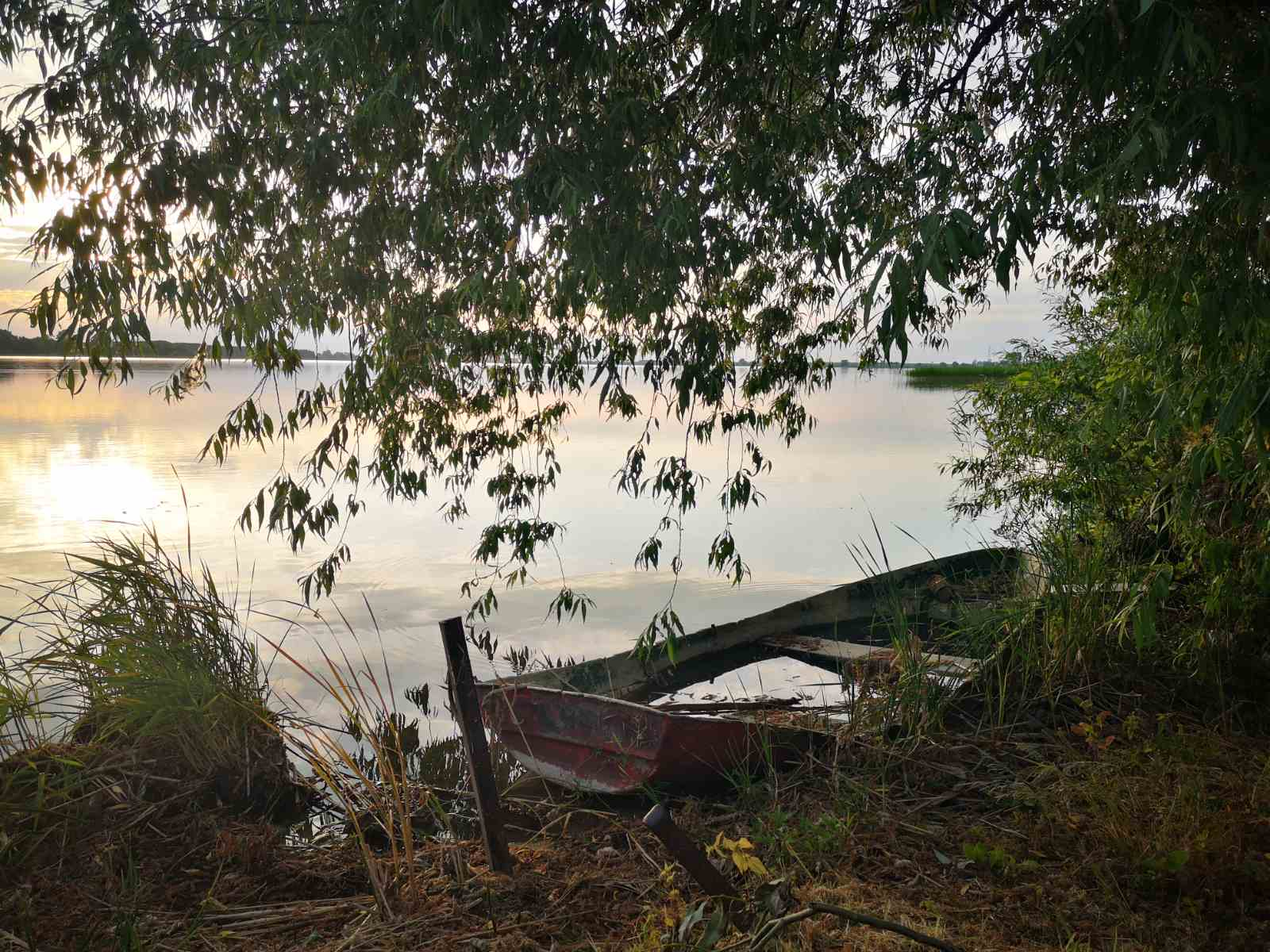
Abandoned fishing boat

Throughout the lake's history, it was someone's property, but since 1940 the lake belongs to the state. Fishing is allowed in the lake with a fishing ticket. Every year the lake is stocked by newly bred fish. Sprat fish contains 76% of fish stock in the lake, valuable fish 19% and 5% crayfish respectively.

In the north of the lake was a clay quarry. Clay was dug from the lake's bed and used for the last 500 years to make bricks. Due to this activity, the lake's shape in that part has been changed.
