= Simnas =

- Town
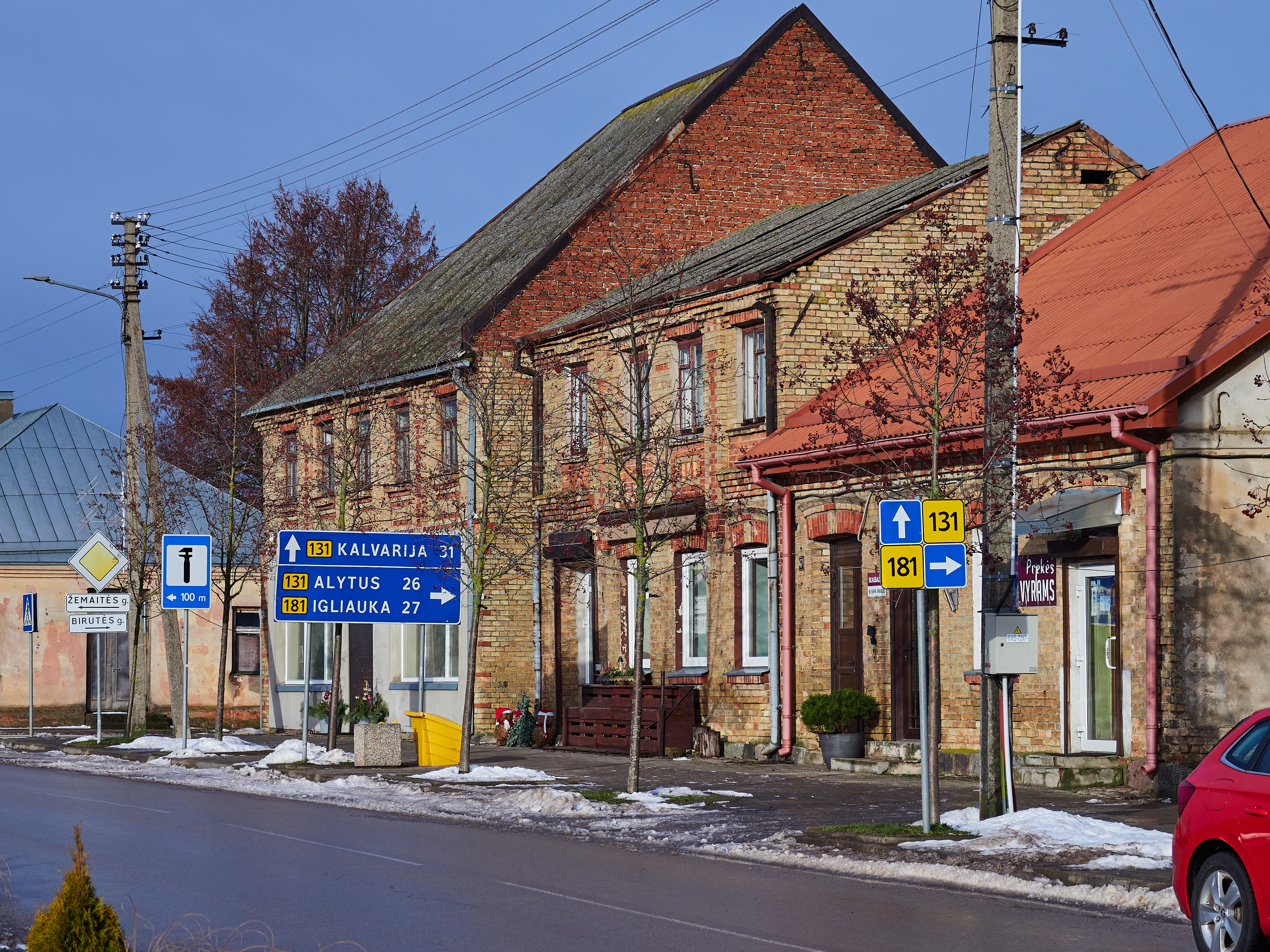
- Old houses in the city center

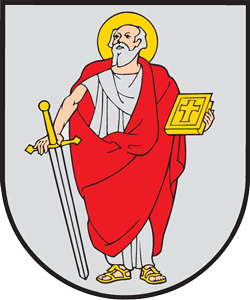
- Coat of arms

- Location of Simnas
- Coordinates: 54°24′0″N 23°39′0″E
- Country: Lithuania
- Ethnographic region: Dzūkija
- County: Alytus County
- Municipality: Alytus district municipality
- Eldership: Simnas eldership
- Capital of: Simnas eldership
- First mentioned: 1382
- Granted Magdeburg rights: 1626

Population (2022)
  - Total: 1,209
- Time zone: UTC+2 (EET)
  - Summer (DST): UTC+3 (EEST)

Simnas is small town on the river Dovinė between Simnas and Giluitis lakes, in Alytus district, Alytus county, in the south of Lithuania. It lies on the 131 a national primary road from Alytus to Kalvarija. Simnas is located within the ethnographical region Dzūkija. According to the 2022 data, 1209 people live in the town with 3148 in Simnas eldership. It is most populous settlement in Alytus district.

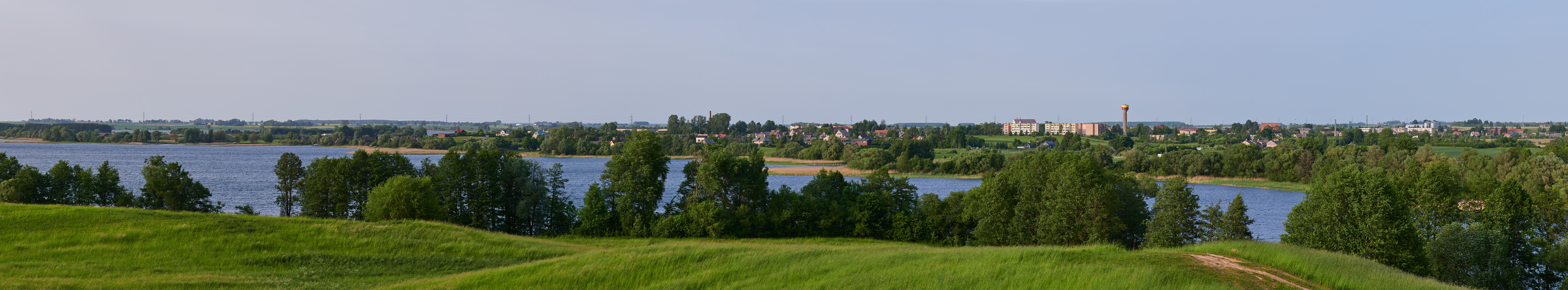
Simnas along Giluitis lake.

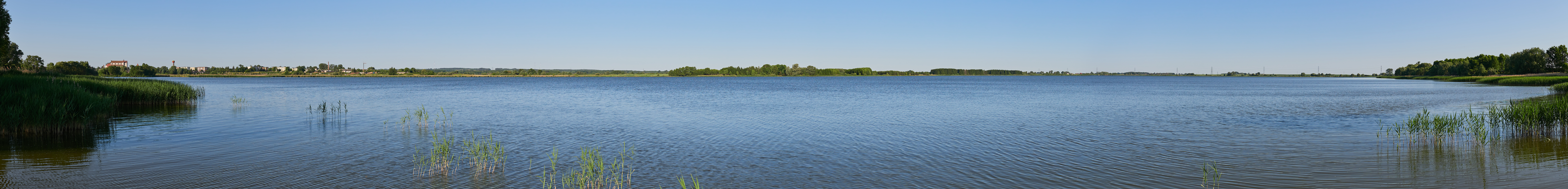
Simnas lake

== History ==
Simnas started as a hunting hut for the Grand Duke of Lithuania in a strategic place where a river flows into a lake. Gradually, the living place around the hut turned to an estate. Wigand of Marburg, a German chronicler, describes Lithuanians victory under the leadership of Grand Duke Vytautas against Crusades in Simnas (Samenike in chronicle) near the lake in 1382. In Lithuanian chronicle, Simnas' name was mentioned in the Grand Duke of Lithuania Alexander Jagiellon writings in 1494 as a manor with peasants for the first time. The origin of Simnas' name is unclear and remains a mystery. There is no other similar or analogic name in the Baltic language. Some local lore says that two giants - Simas and Sinas - lived around the place and after their death half the name of each was added together to create the current town name. Another version of the name is the corruption of the human name Simonas. But most historians believe that the name origin is hydronym, taken from a lake's name where the hunting hut stood.

In 1506, Grand Duke of Lithuania Alexander Jagiellon donated Simnas manor to nobleman Jonas Zaberezinskas. As a good statesman and organizer, he built a brick church in 1520-1526. This is another mystery about Simnas because neither wooden nor old churches have ever been mentioned before in any written sources. Around the church began to develop settlements. The Simnas coat of arms was created in 1536, depicting St. Peter and Paul. In a letter of the Grand Duke of Lithuania in 1549, Simnas mentioned the town. 10 years later a new road was laid from Simnas to Königsberg, showing the importance of the town and its location. More ever, in 1613, Simnas was marked on the map for the first time.

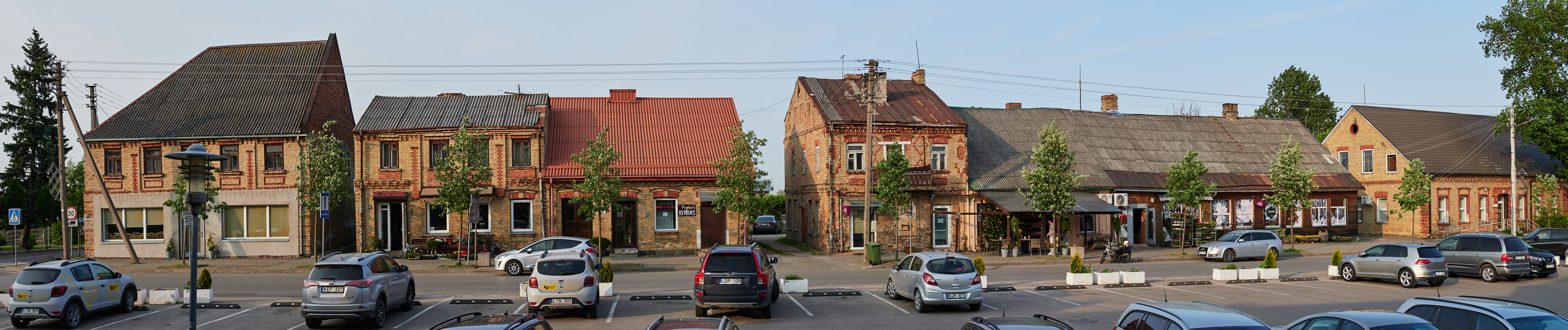
Town central square.

In 1603, Simnas went into the hands of Paweł Stefan Sapieha, the member of a wealthy politician family. Due to his efforts, in 1626, Simnas was granted Magdeburg town rights by Sigismund III Vasa. Which means that at that time Simnas had a mayor, town hall, court, judge, jail, shops, inns, mills, cobbled road and footpath and held annual fair and markets. After that situation in a town dramatically changed: a coat of arms image of St. Peter was dropped, St. Paul remained, who gave a hint to a patron of the town - Povilas (Paul) Sapiega. The townspeople dropped Lithuanian and turned to the Polish language. Even Mass in a church became the official Polish language in 1639.

To accelerate the town's economy, the decree of 1 July in 1639 allowed Jews to enter and live in the town; to have land, property, keep business and to be exempt from taxes. Prosperity started to rise but after the Russian invasion of Lithuania in 1655, the town was looted and went into disrepair.

Political curiosity - in a 20 years gap Simnas changed three ruling countries: after the Third Partition of Poland in 1795, Simnas became part of Prussia; in 1807, Simnas fell under the rule of the Polish Duchy of Warsaw on behalf of France; after defeating Napoleon in 1815, for the next 100 years Simnas was occupied by Russia, although initially as part of the autonomous Congress Poland.

Living under occupation, life did not stop but continued with population growth. Places to bury deceased people around the church was overfilled, so local authorities, in 1858, established a new cemetery in a former hunting manor estate where the town started. After the January Uprising of 1863-1864, the tsarist government understood the importance of roads to the military. A new road was laid between Simnas and Marijampolė. Traffic increased and it led to the opening of the Post station and office in 1872. The letter collection and delivery was carried twice a week in town and once a week in its suburbs. Along with traffic activity on the road, infectious diseases followed and in 1871, a cholera epidemic attacked town. Many people and animals died. After the withdrawal of the epidemic, a new law was introduced that every house must keep a toilet cabin. Defecation around the corner was banned. In 1878, a pharmacy was opened. The streets and footpaths were paved. In 1882, a fire station was built.

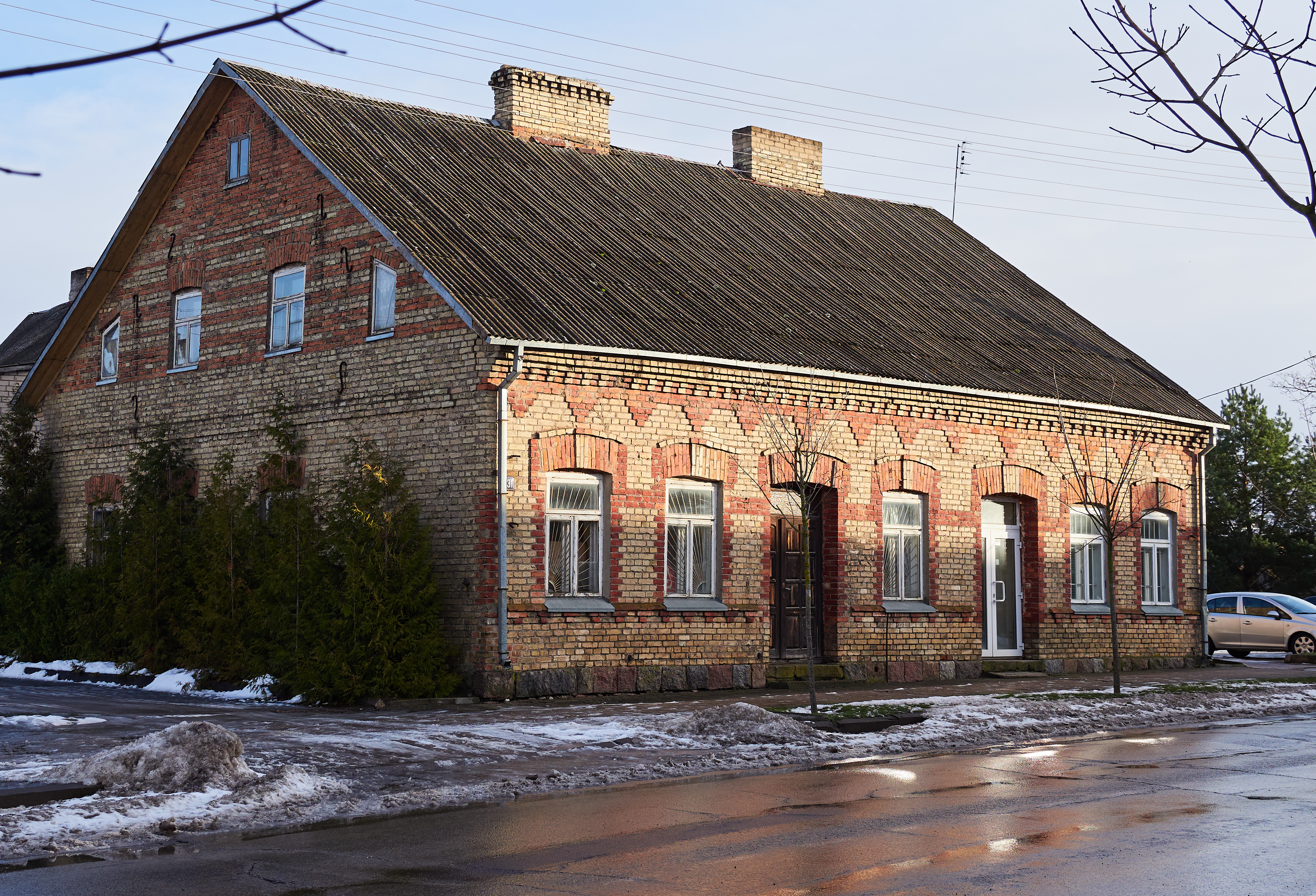
Old Post office

A Census of 1888 showed that town population was 1870 people of whom 944 Jews and 926 Polish. No one declared themself as Lithuanians. Official state language was Russian. 10 times a year the town held an annual fair. In 1897, the railway was built on the South side of the town and a telegraph office opened. A new road between Simnas and Alytus was laid. The Police station had 6 policemen to keep order around.

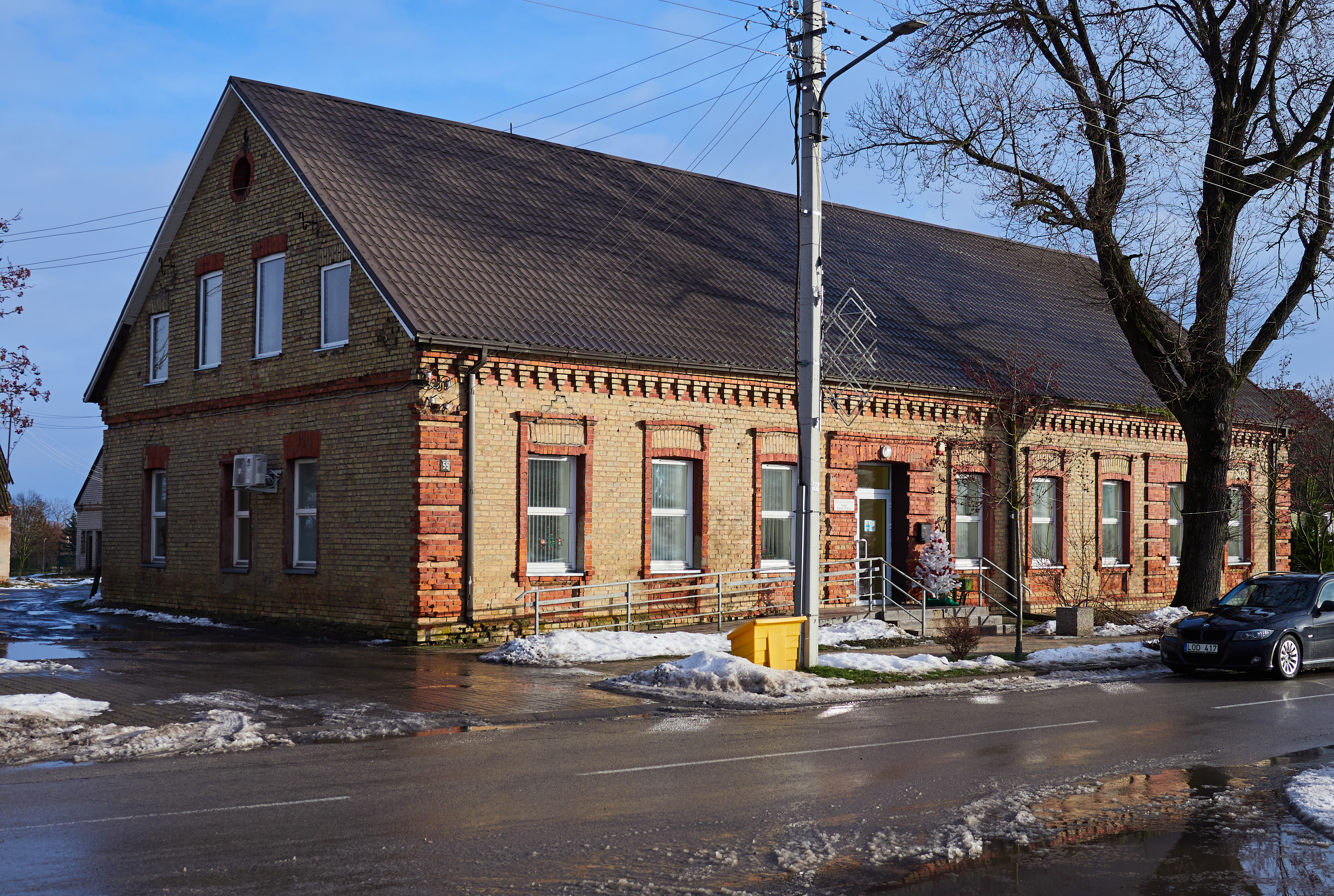
Medical clinic

In the end of the 19th century, national revival began. People started to demand to use the Lithuanian language. After fighting, in 1897 first Mass in a church was held in Lithuanian language. In 1899 the town suffered a disaster - after a faulty chimney a fire started and devastated the town. Half of it, from church to Simnas lake, turned to ashes. Another disaster followed after the beginning of World War I in 1914. Fighting three times happened in the town limits, so after all, wooden houses were burned. Before World War I German intelligence reported that Simnas had 1979 people of whom 786 are Jews.

After the Declaration of Independence in 1918, a new era began. In 1919, the first telephone started to operate in post offices. In 1927, a power station was built and all town streets were lit. 25 households had telephones. In 1929, townspeople had 3 cars and 1 truck. In 1935, a nursing home for women was built, followed by a hospital which had a dentist and midwife; creamery in 1937; secondary school in 1939 and central sewage system laid across town. The town operated 93 shops of which only 4 were Lithuanians, the rest of them jewish; 2 pharmacies, 2 distilleries, 3 banks, 2 hotels, 5 restaurants, 4 pubs, 1 beer bulk warehouse, 2 inns, 2 tea shops, 3 wool mills, 2 shoe workshops and a lemonade factory. In 1893, both lakes - Simnas and Giluitis - became property of Jews.

After World War I until World War II, the town had a militia which operated at night with 3 volunteers. Their duties were to keep order at night, guard from theft, to silent drunken behavior and fire monitoring.

In 1940, the town faced a second Russian occupation; then German invasion for 4 years and finally in 1991, after regaining an Independence of Lithuania, Simnas gradually became a beautiful town.

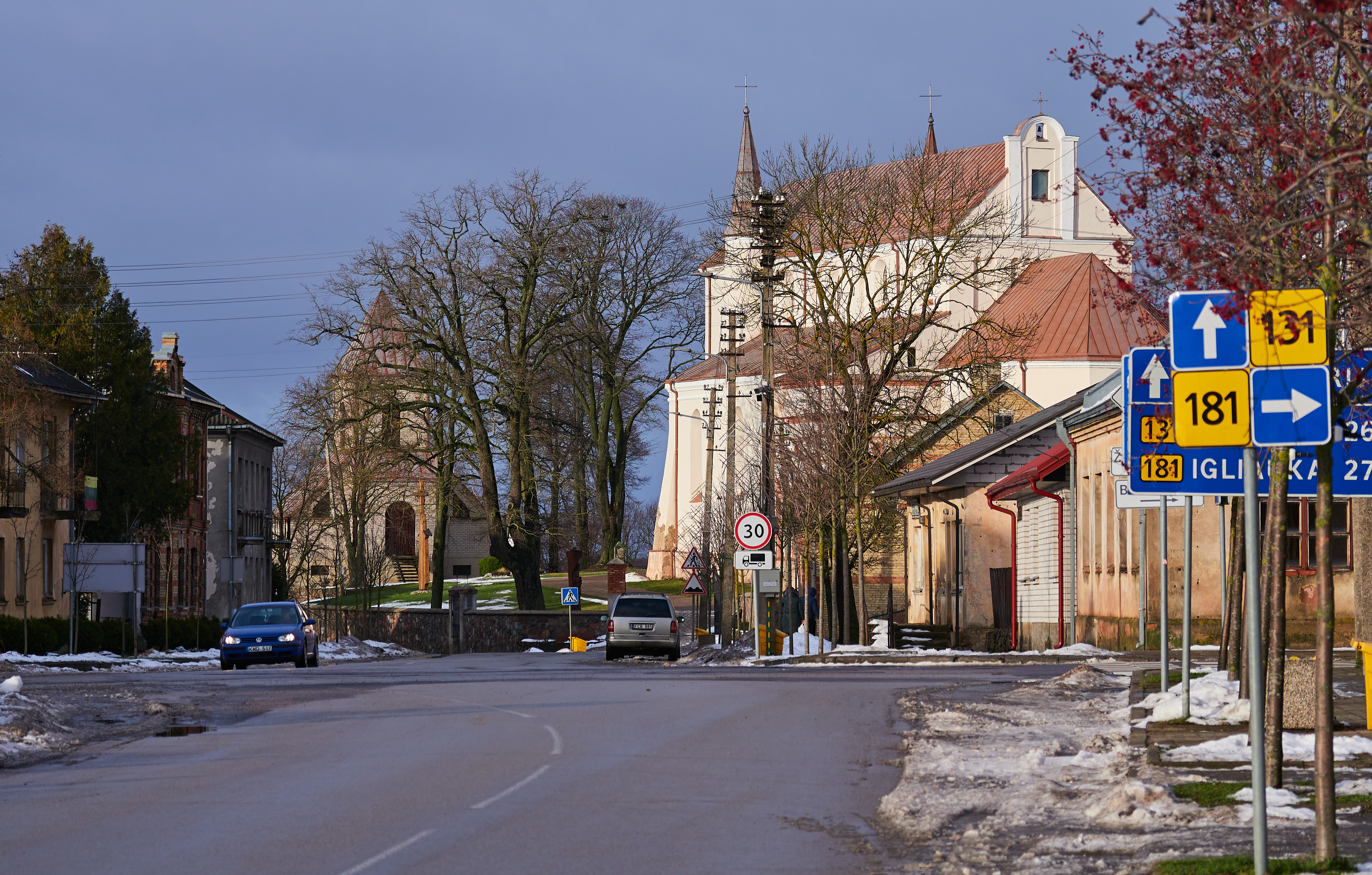
Main street

== Demographics ==
Since the beginning of settlement in the 14th century, the population increased steadily, despite wars and epidemics, and the number of inhabitants never decreased. Being Lithuanians, from 1626 until 1918, townspeople spoke Polish. In 1639, more Jews arrived, dividing the population in half, both religiously and socially, but strife never happened. During 160 years of Russian occupation, only a few Russian speakers settled in the town.

From the 18th century, town population reached a peak of around 2000 people and remained until 2004, when Lithuania joined European Union. During World War II entire Jews population was wiped out: over 600 were perished in Holocaust, others emigrated. The number of inhabitants after the war rose fast due to industrial activity which attracted new residents.

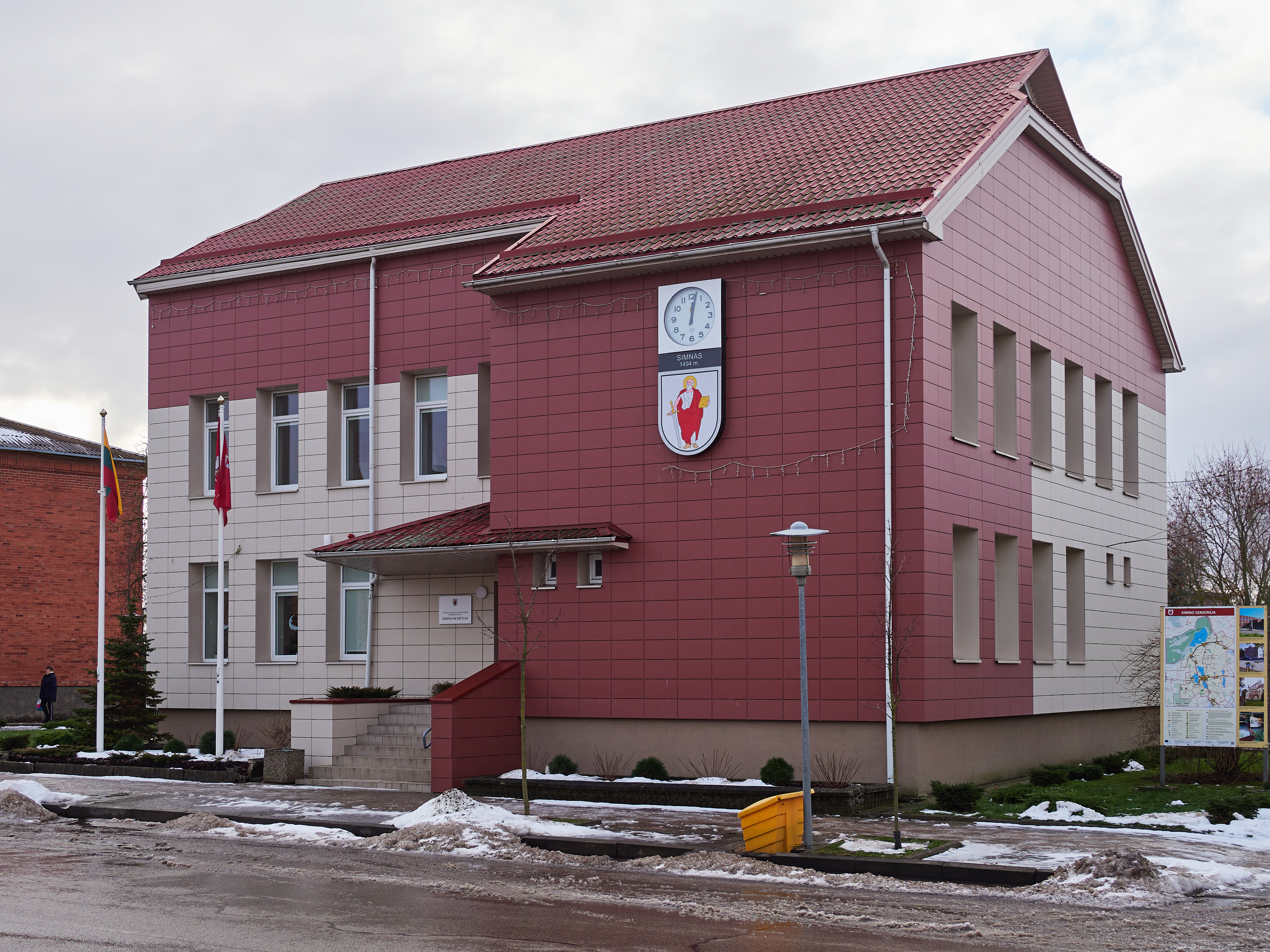
Town council

After joining the European Union in 2004, around one third (30%) of townspeople emigrated for countries like: Great Britain, Ireland, Denmark, Germany, Scandinavia and USA. Electronic Census in 2021 showed that the population in town remained 1209. Ethnically 98% of residents are Lithuanians with a strong Catholic background.

== Geography ==
Simnas town is surrounded by 3 lakes: Simnas lake in the north, Giluitis lake in the west and Kalesninkai lakes in the south which contains 12 large and small fish breeding ponds. Throughout town runs the river Dovinė, formerly Spernia, which flows into Simnas lake.

January is the coldest month and July is warmest with average -3'C and 16'C respectively. Thunder occurs more frequently, up to 45 times a year, compared to the rest of the country due to a combination of sandy soil and woodlands in the southside of the town.

== Economy ==
"Alytaus Melioracija" (from 1959) is the main employer and the backbone of the town. Even two living estates were built to accommodate workers. The company activities are: reclamation systems; hydrotechnical structures; landfill construction; engineering work; pond digging; plant hire; road, street and bridge building.

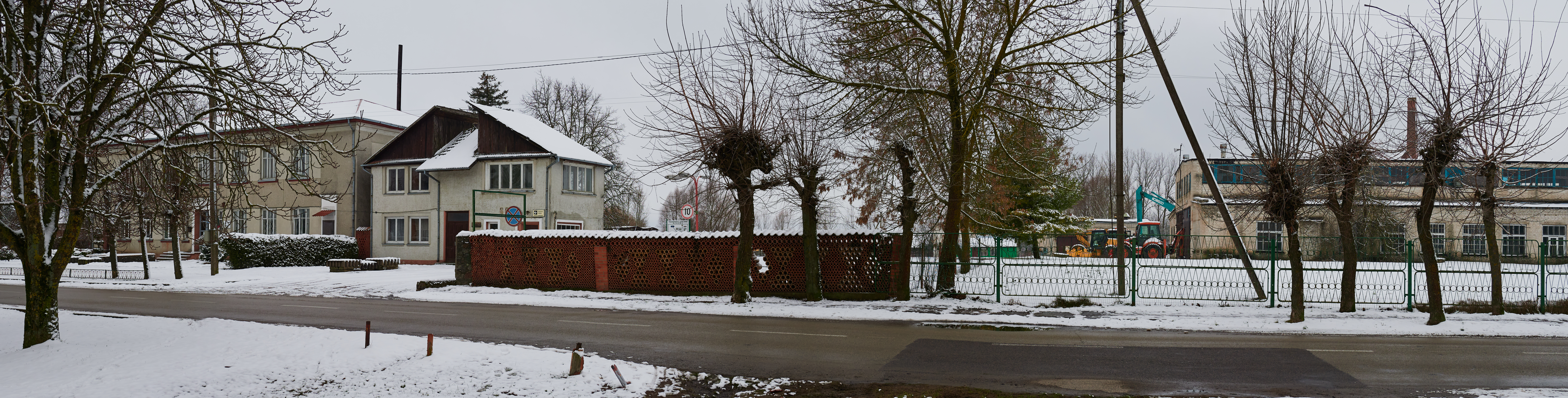
"Alytaus Melioracija".

Sewing factory, the division of "Alytaus Dainava" (from 1979), which makes casual, classic wear and formal suits. "Simno Eksperimentinis Žuvú veislynas" (from 1964) breeds fish, crawfish and fills up rivers and lakes with live fish.

"Simno komunalininkas" is a town management company, responsible for cold and hot water supply; heat delivery to houses in a winter time; operating a sewage system and water treatment plant; cleaning town streets and maintaining green spaces.

The town has a Fire station, Heating station, Post office, pharmacy, medical and dental clinics, 2 fuel stations, few garages and a number of shops. Police station ceased to operate some years ago. Surprisingly, there are no hotels, restaurants and pubs in the town.

== Education ==
Education in Simnas has a long story. In 1667, mentioned the school building with clerk and teacher Augustinas Obryckis. Parish school (in Polish language) was established in 1782 with 10 pupils. After the 1864 rebellion, Tzar authorities closed school and opened Russian school which lasted until World War I. In 1918, primary school was opened in Lithuanian language. Soon after Jews opened school in the synagogue in 1920 and for a short period of time, 1921 - 1924, Polish school acted.

In 1943, a secondary school was built which become Gymnasium in 2007.

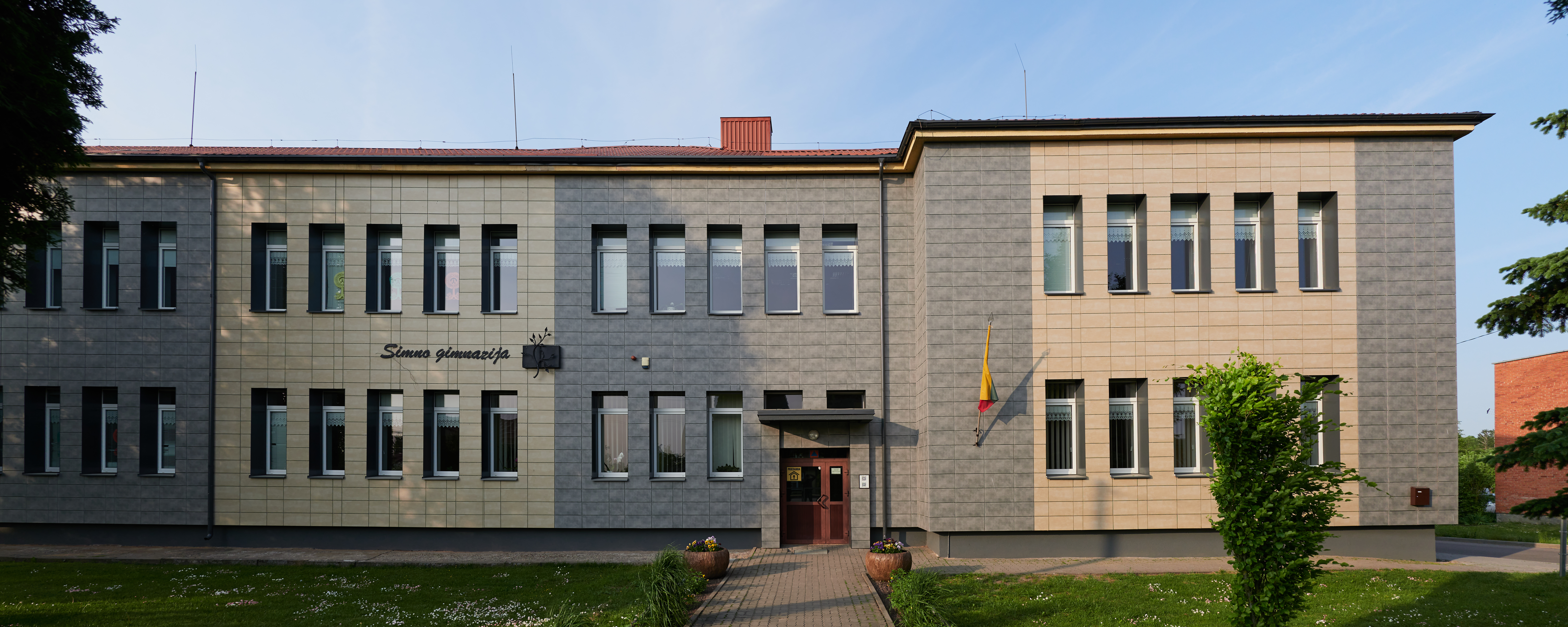
Gymnasium.

During a short stint with secondary school, 1944 - 1949, worked Anzelmas Matutis, lithuanian language teacher, who later became a famous and renowned children poet.

In 1959, the school was built for orphans and children from poor families. In 1968, it became a Special school for children with learning difficulties. In 1970, the school opened a gymnastic class for movement disorder and in 1993 class for children with mild mental retardation.

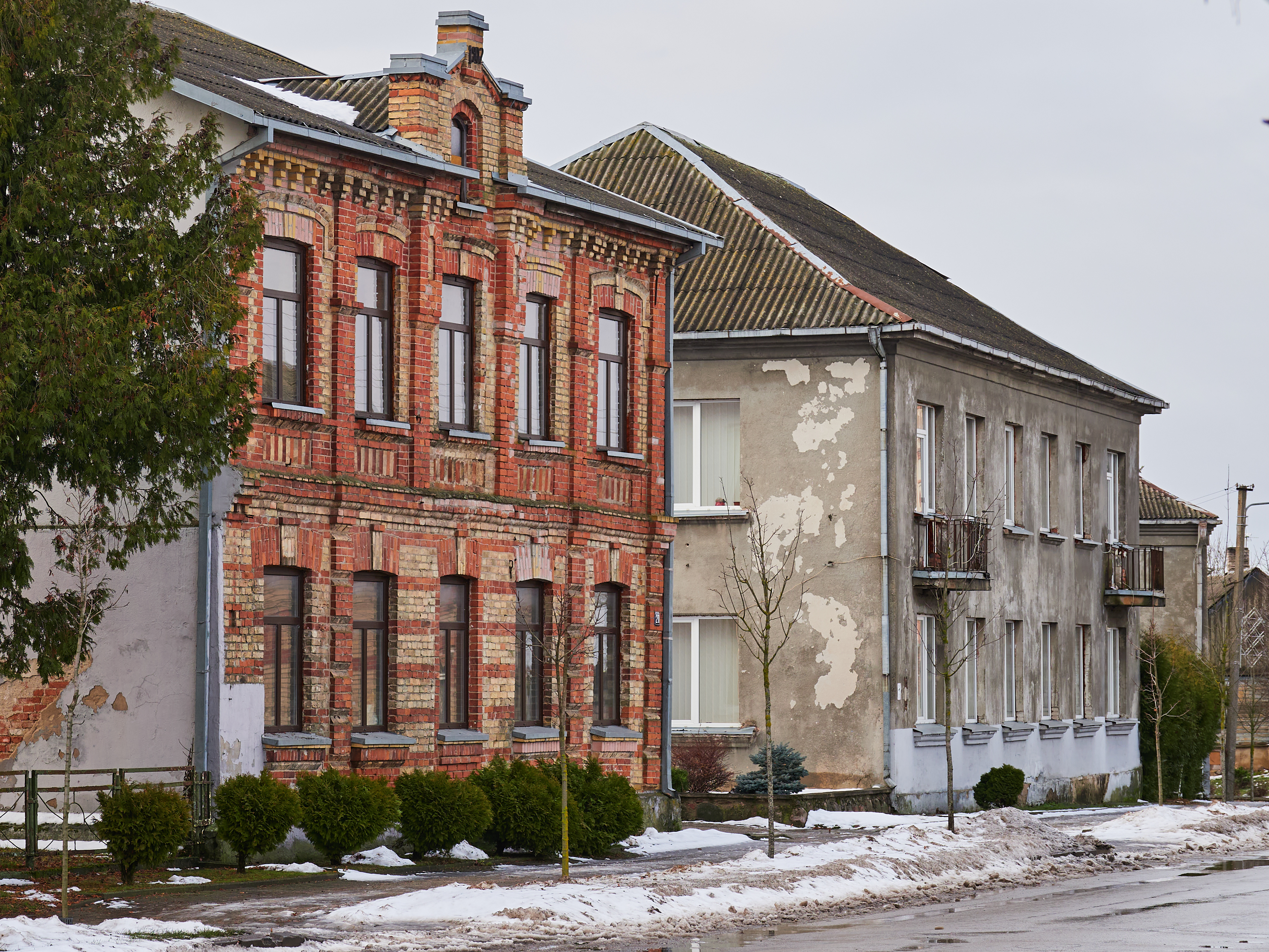
Special school.

In 1986, Technical school was opened for construction and agriculture sectors. Today a few modules were added such as cookery, stitching and car repair service.

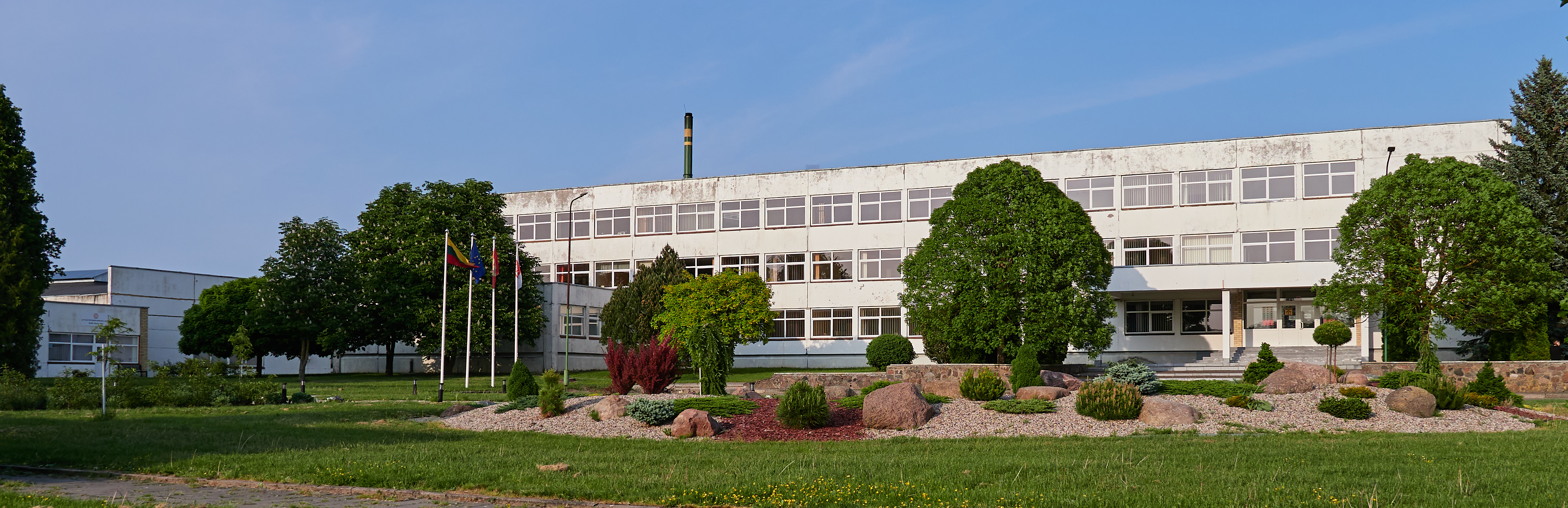
Technical school.

== Culture and Arts ==
Since the beginning of the Lithuanian national revival in the end of the 19th century, gradually started to establish cultural organizations. In 1893, the Catholic society "Žiburys" was founded, a pioneer of the temperance movement. In 1906, "Žiburys" established a library in town and in 1910 organized a first theatre play. It sparked the creation of the town theatre in 1937. After World War II, a cultural centre was established 1944 - 1952 in the parish hall. Due to growing population demand, the cultural centre relocated to a derelict synagogue. It had more space. The newly built cultural centre was opened in 1984 with cinema, library, discoteque, conference and rehearsal halls. As of 2022, the Centre hosts 2 dance groups and 6 music bands.

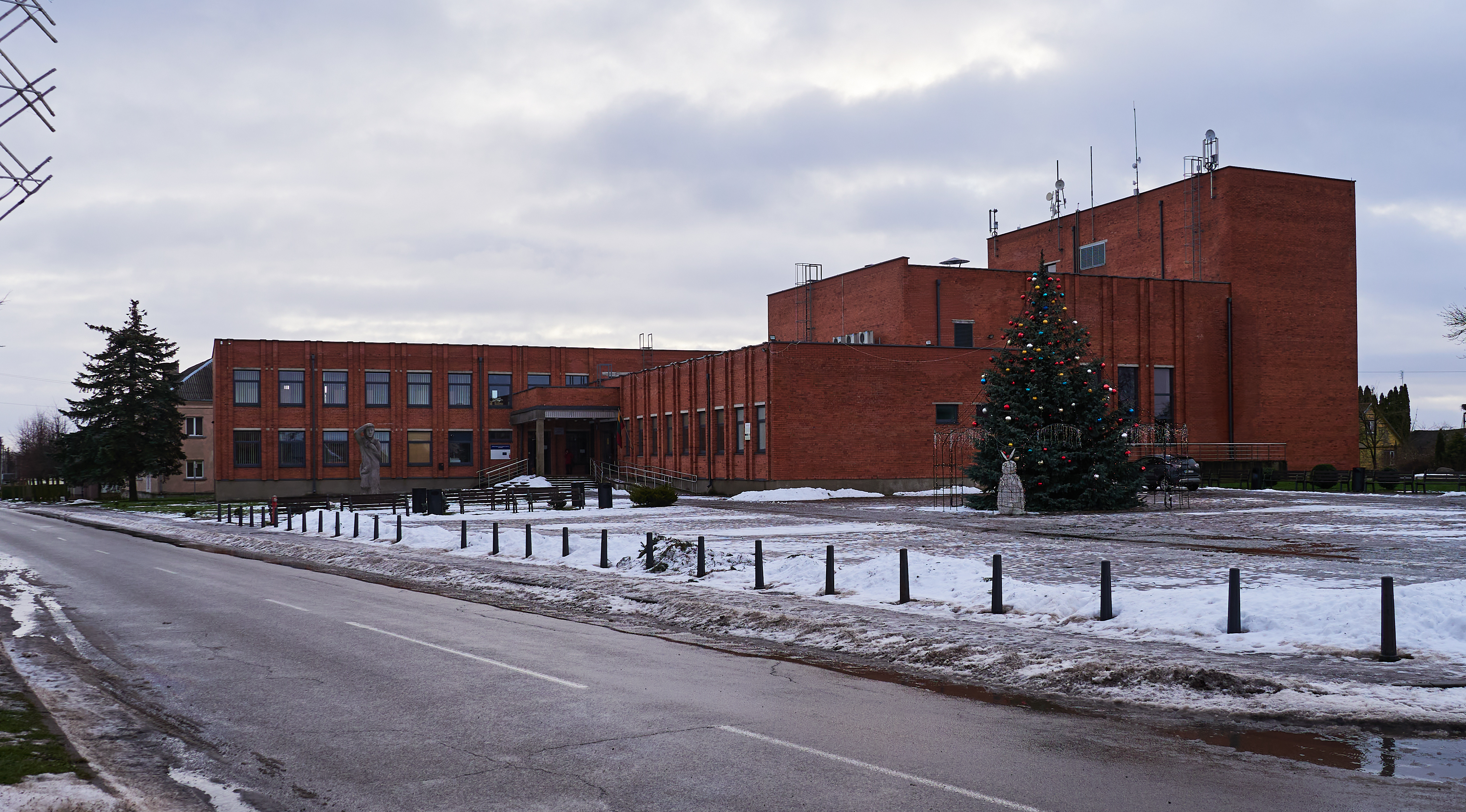
Cultural Centre.

From 1994, Special school has the theatre "Runa". Every year they produce one play and all actors are children or teens with impaired intellect.

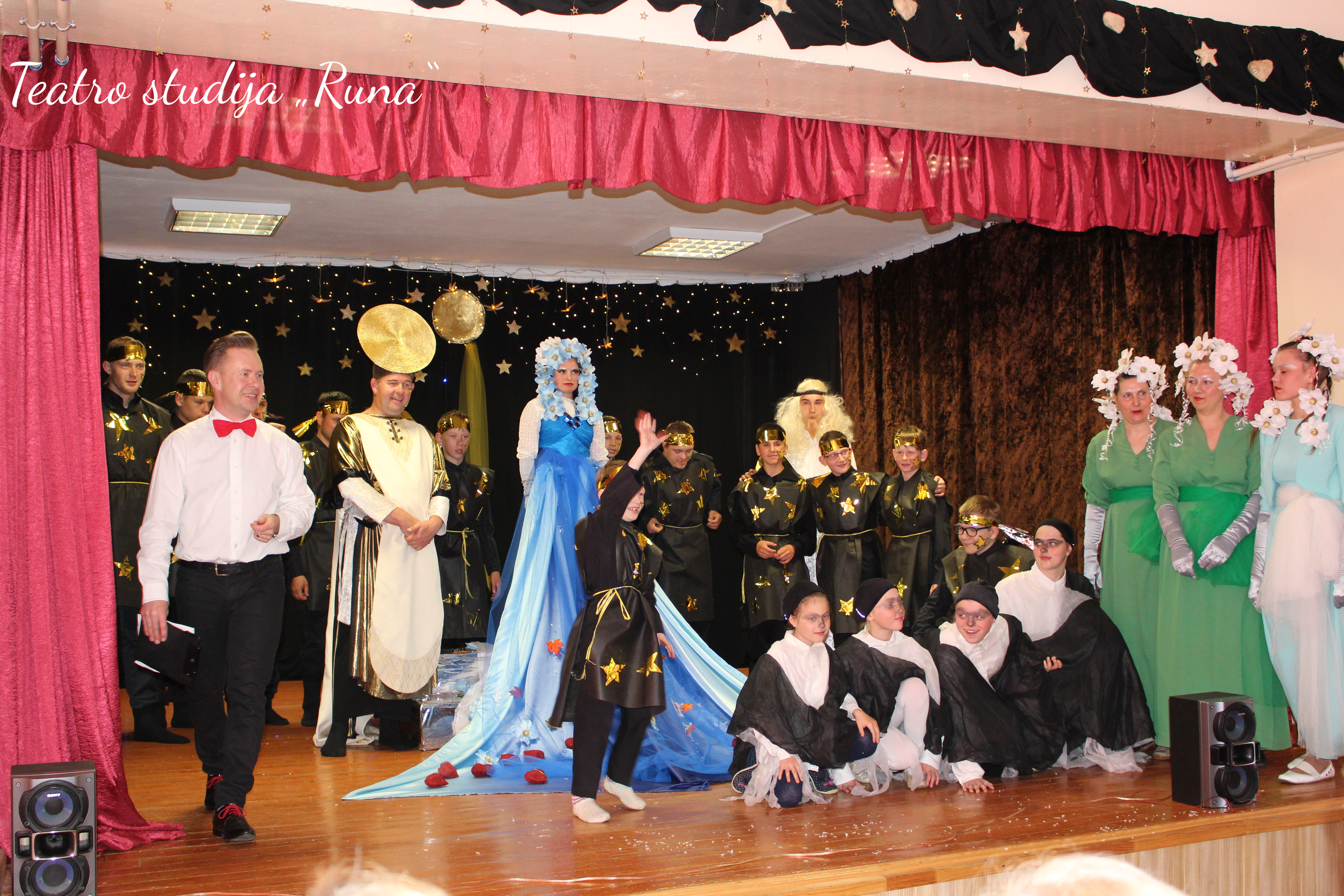
Actors of theatre "Runa".

The first newspaper "Kelias į Komunizmá" circulated 1951 - 1959. Town had its own printing house.

In 1972, on the outskirts of town, the Catholic Church started publishing the underground newspaper "Lietuvos Bažnyčios Kronika". Newspapers reported about the situation in Lithuania, how soviet authorities supprest everyday life and about their crimes against humanity. It was printed in two languages: Lithuanian - to circulate across Lithuania, and in English - to distribute in the Western world. The newspaper lasted until 1989 and throughout its life span it never was caught by soviet security. It is a unique phenomenon and the only newspaper of its kind in Lithuania and in the entire Soviet Union.

In 2000, Simnas had a short lived newspaper Simno Kronika.

Vytautas Babravičius - Simas (b.1952), journalist and musician, a pioneer of country music in Lithuania, who released 9 albums, took the stage name Simas because it is allusion to Simnas town, where he attended a Special school for orphans.

Robertas Slavėnas (1963 - 2019), musician and composer, who released 1 album and contributed composing and playing songs for local musicians, lived in Simnas.

Arvydas Šeškevičius (1939 - 2023), the professor cardiologist, a pioneer in palliative care in Lithuania, was born in Simnas. He wrote 5 books about palliative care, and as a local historian he wrote 6 books about Simnas.

Ksaveras Sakalauskas - Vanagėlis (1863 - 1938), teacher, writer and poet was born 2 km away from Simnas. He attended Simnas primary school. Some of his poetry turned to folk songs.

Antanas Aleksandravičius (1885 - 1970), sculptor with over 842 works was born 6 km away from Simnas.

Matas Menčinskas (1896 - 1942), sculptor and painter with around 200 works was born 6 km away from Simnas.

Emilija Liegutė (1930 - 2022), writer and playwright, attended Simnas secondary school. She wrote 32 books and 6 plays.

Anzelmas Matutis (1923 - 1985), children poet, worked as a Lithuanian language teacher in Simnas secondary school. He wrote 36 books.

Vytautas Kasiulis (1918 - 1995) was born in Simnas. He is the most prominent modern art painter, best known Lithuanian painter in the world. In his portfolio over 900 works, of which nearly 600 paintings.

Danutė Vepštienė (b.1946), former primary school teacher, wrote 3 poetry books. She lives in Simnas.

== Places of interest ==
Simnas Church was built 1520 - 1526. It's the oldest church in Southern Lithuania and the only cross-shaped church in the entire Lithuania.

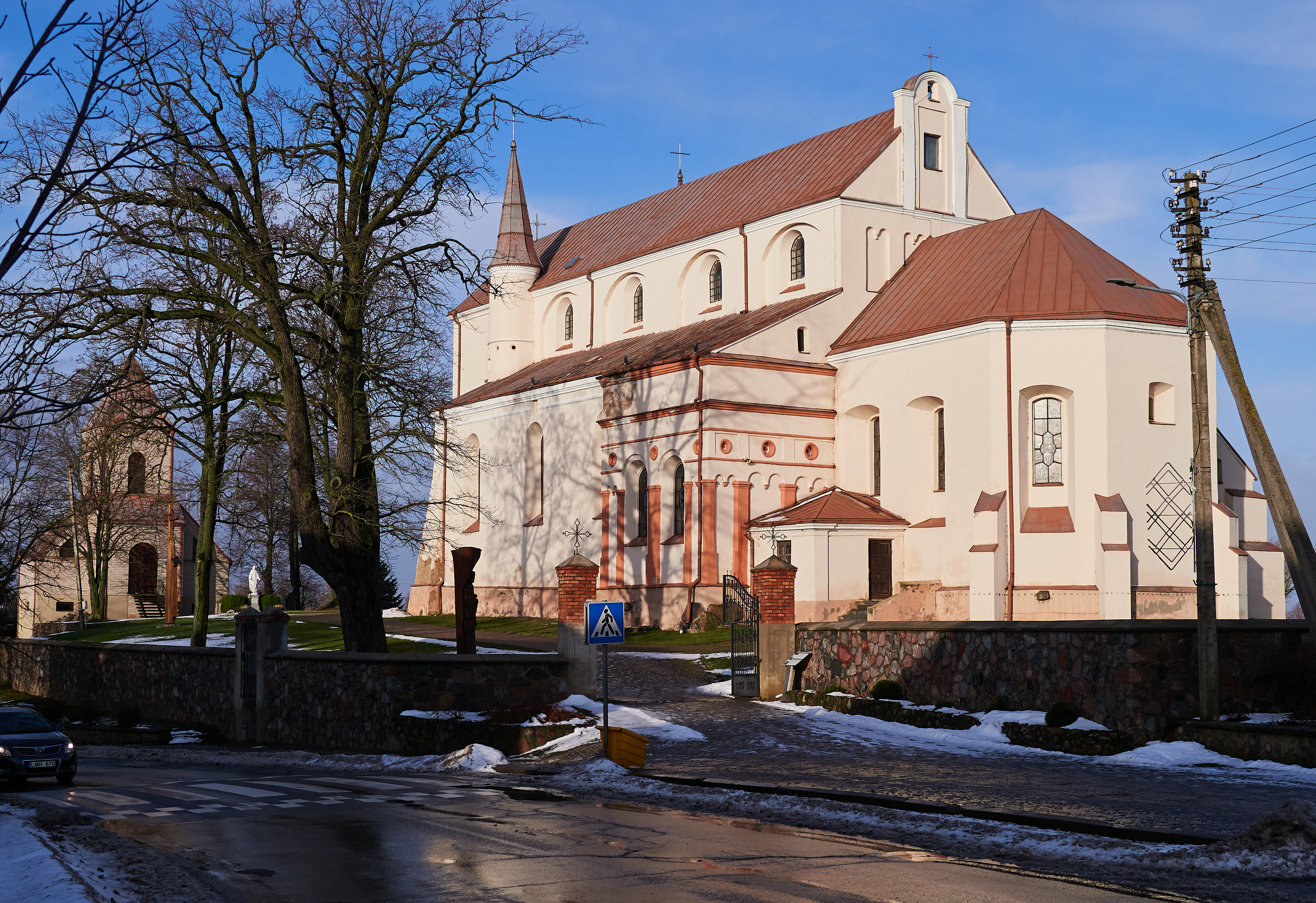
Church, built in 1520.

100 years passed after the baptism of Lithuania. The country was sparsely populated and there were a few churches and no parishes. Every nobleman started to build a private church in a manor estate with privilege to the new priest. When Jonas Zaberezinskis got Simnas manor from the Great Duke of Lithuania in 1506, he acted in the same way. The church was built in 1520 and looked like a castle with narrow windows and wall thickness up to 1,5 metres. According to some accounts, the church shape was designed under influence of Italian Renaissance architect Aristotele Fioravanti works in Moscow, Russia.

The first priest of the church got privileges as follows: 3 villages in his possession, inn in Simnas, fire wood and timber for free, free fish from Simnas lake, to use a grain mill free of charge, 4 rich farmers to supply food and cash, 10% of summer harvest from Simnas manor. People were charged for church service and everyone must donate Christmas money for church.

In 1551, the nobleman of Simnas manor died leaving no heirs and the church became property of the king. He leased the church to a nobleman for a symbolic charge. The church was built without a proper roof, so for the next 300 years the church had a roof made of planks and covered by straw and sawdust. Only in the beginning of the 1800s was the roof was covered by clay slates.

In 1738, the organ was mentioned in the church log book. When Napoleon's army retreated back from an unsuccessful company in Russia in 1812, the church was converted to military hospital and devastated by soldiers.

The church had a trellis fence around the churchyard and in 1778, the fence was replaced by a wooden fence made of planks and stone pillars. Finally, in 1887, a stone fence was built and stands today.

From 1626, Mass was held in the Polish language, but the national revival started and from 1897, the Mass became Lithuanian. During World War I, fighting in town limits happened 3 times, but cannons were unable to penetrate church walls. World War II did little damage to the church, but on retreat, German soldiers set a fire and after 2 days of burning the church was burned down to the core. Gradually, over the periods of time, the church was restored and now fully stands.

German soldiers' cemetery located 2 km away from Simnas, in the outskirts of Mergalaukis village. Around 400 World War I soldiers are buried there. In the centre of the cemetery is the grave of Lieutenant Ernst Wurche. He was a friend of famous German writer and poet Walter Flex and became the prototype of the main character of his novel "The Wanderer Between Two Worlds". The main action of the book takes place in Simnas and around town. The book was printed in 1916 with around 700 000 copies.

Žuvintas biosphere reserve is the oldest (1937), the first reserve and largest wetland in Lithuania. Its size is 70 km². It's a bird sanctuary and the only biosphere sanctuary in Lithuania. A boggy, shallow lake with an average depth of 0,6 m and loads of floating vegetation islands. It is the only one lake of its kind in Lithuania.

In Aleknonys, 11 km away from Simnas, is a visitor centre. In 2011, the sanctuary was included to the UNESCO list.

Ąžuoliniai (Bambininkai) windmill is standing 7 km away from Simnas. Built in 1929, it is the biggest windmill in Southern Lithuania.

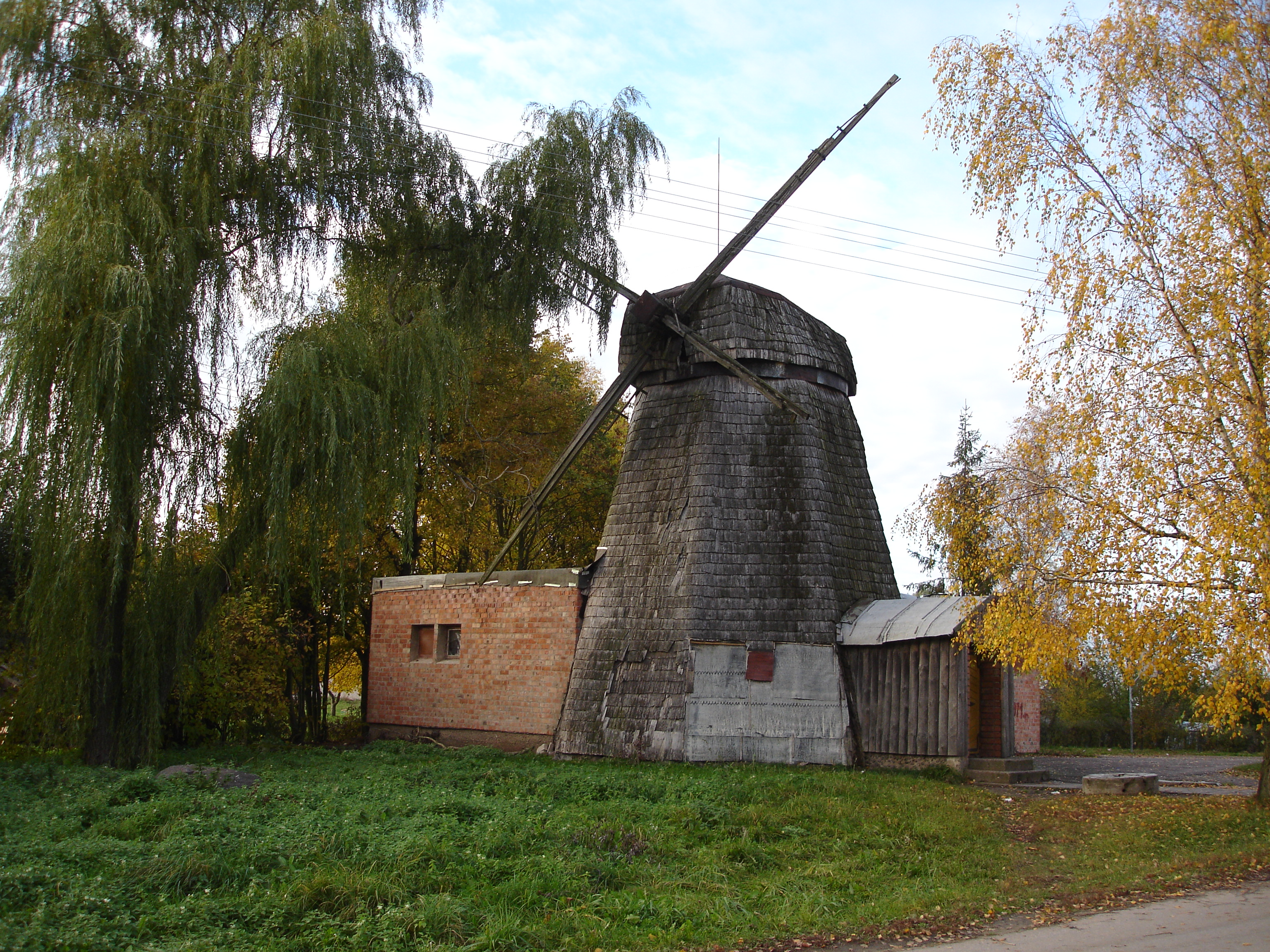
Ažuoliniai (Bambininkai) windmill. Photo circa 2006.

== Sport ==
At the dawn of the 20th century, people started to demand more entertainment. In 1926, Jews established the sports club "Maccabi". In 1934, Lithuanians formed a football team and built a pitch. Since then, football has become the most popular sport. Throughout its long history, the football team has changed the name many times: "Žalgiris" (1945), "Rajono Koopsajunga" (1955), "Kooperatininkas" (1957), "Nemunas" (1958), "Dzūkija" (1970), "Melioratorius" (1979), "Peletrūnas" (1985), "Dzūkija" (1996) and football club "FK Simnas" (2001).

Today, the town has two football pitches - of natural lawn and artificial grass, built in 2010.

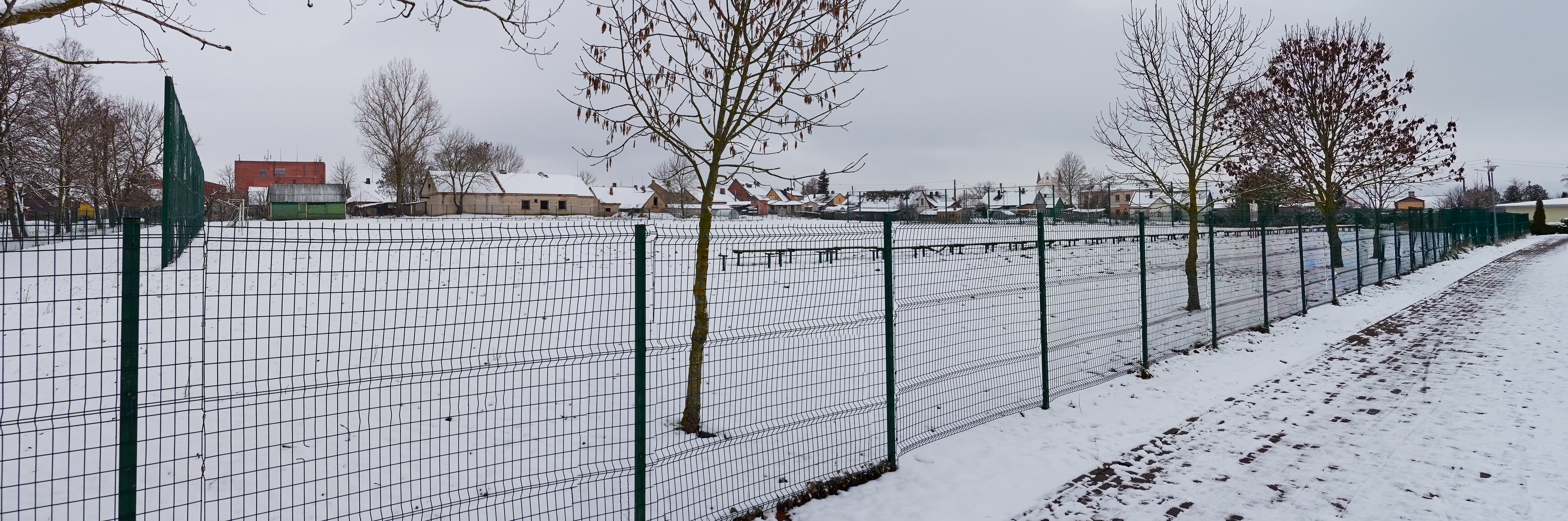
Football pitch.

They were the 3rd place winner in the Premier League and LFF Cup winner as a manager in 2009, and the 1st League winner (Lithuania) as a manager in 2016.

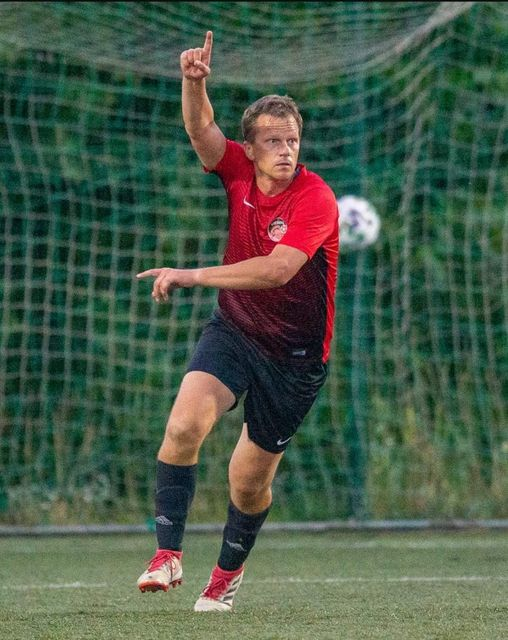
Aurimas Šarapajevas.

Indoor soccer championship winner as manager in 2019. His trained player Justinas Marazas played for Lithuania International.

Gintaras Šalkauskas (b.1977), disabled in a wheelchair. 6-times winner of special Athletics and Weightlifting games (Lithuania) in 1999 - 2004 period. 3-times winner of Arm bending championship in 2001, 2002 and 2004, Lithuania.

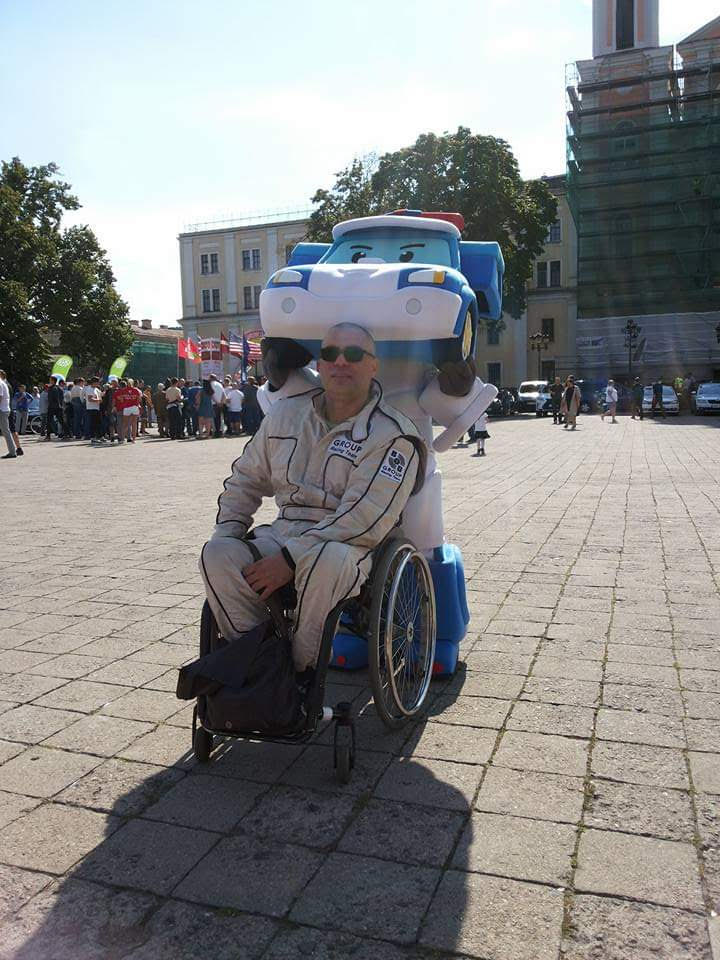
Gintaras Šalkauskas

From 2002, he turned to motor sport. In 2006 and 2008, he won the Rally Around Lithuania Cup. He was 1st out of 12 cars driven by disabled drivers. In 2007, 2012 and 2013, he won Rally Around Lithuania President Cup among disable drivers. Mini rally class "Open 4WD" champion in 2017, Lithuania.

Valdemaras Chomičius (b.1959), basketball player and coach, was born in the outskirts of Simnas. He is World champion, Europe champion (2 times), Olympic games champion, Soviet Union champion (3 times), Russian league and Ukraine league champion. When he was an infant, his family left Simnas for Kaunas.

== Events ==
Every year on the first weekend in March, the town has the Kaziuko Kermošius fair. It is dedicated to St. Casimir, patron of Lithuania. A craft fair and food festival is held in the town's central square, lasting all day and finishing with concerts at night.

Since 2005, on the first weekend in June and next to Giluitis lake, an annual beach volleyball competition has been organized by the sport club "Ąžuolas". It attracts volleyball lovers from all over Lithuania.

On 23 June every year, the town celebrates St. John Night with ceremonies and concerts.

== Jews ==
The decree of 1 July in 1639 allowed Jewish people to enter and live in Simnas; to have property, land and business and be exempt from taxes. It had the purpose of stimulating the local economy. It went very well and the jewish community in Simnas gradually started to grow. From the 18th century, half of the town population were Jews. They were friendly and conflicts never happened.

Jacob Barit (1797 - 1883), a Talmudist and communal worker was born in Simnas. However, there were two attempts to make a pogrom against Jews in 1881 and 1886. It was told purposely, that Jews were waiting for the arrival of the Antichrist and they needed to steal ceremonial things from the Catholic church for their rituals. A Mob, armed with stakes and stones, was roaming and waiting for Jews. It was a remote echo of Jews pogroms in Russia. Due to a clever catholic priest, who on Sunday Mass explained to people about delusion, the skirmish never happened.

In 1905, the new brick synagogue was built instead of wooden. In 1920, a primary school worked inside a synagogue.

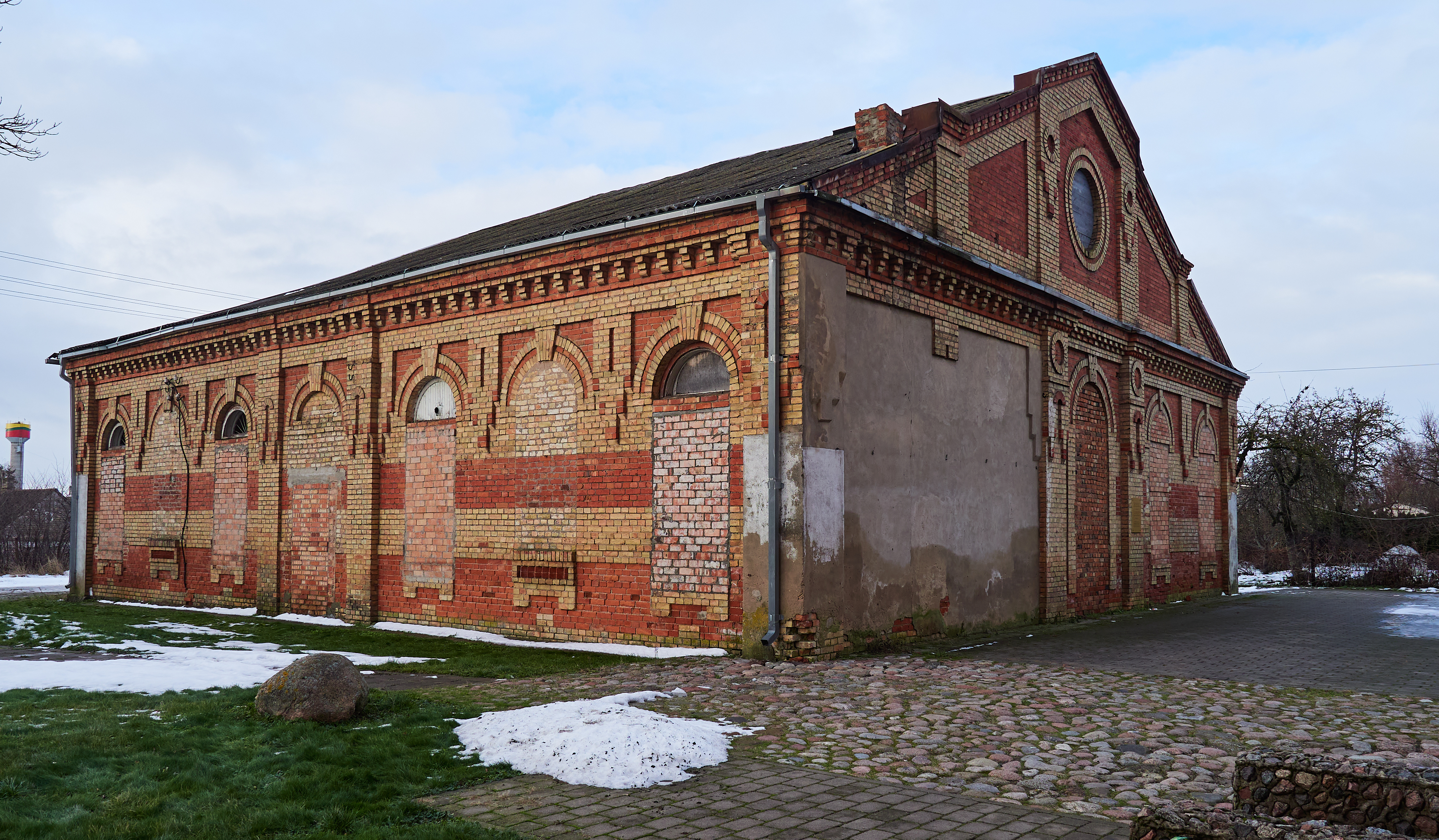
Synagogue. Photo circa 2022.

After World War I, the situation dramatically changed for good. Ultimately, Lithuania was arguably the most generous country in Eastern Europe with respect to Jewish national autonomy in the early 1920s. Between 1918 and 1941, it was the Golden Age for Simnas Jews. In fact, nearly all the town's economy was in the Jews hands. They held 89 shops out of 93, inns, hotels, pharmacies, breweries, distilleries, mills and small factories in and around Simnas. Even Simnas, Giluitis and Žuvintas lakes became property of Simnas Jews. Simnas lake owner was Nahum Ishlondsky, Giluitis lake owner was Shaul Bialotzky and Avraham Goldberg and Žuvintas lake owners were Nahum and Zev Ishlondsky. A few Jews had manors and worked as agricultural merchants. Jews were flexible for local clients and always gave goods in "bargain", which mean "credit" in jewish.

There were two Jewish cemeteries in the outskirts of the town. Nearly 90% members of the Fire brigade were Jews. In 1926, Jews established the sports club "Maccabi". The census in 1923 showed that in Simnas lived 314 men and 348 women of Jews. The first car in town was obtained by a wealthy Jew, Boris Bialockij. Main street was covered by yellow - red brick buildings on both sides which belonged to Jews.

Tragedy, the German Invasion happened on 22 June in 1941. On the first day of Simnas bombardment, 4 jews were killed. Other casualties of the first day of war in Simnas: 27 lithuanians, 14 german soldiers, 4 russians and 19 soviet soldiers. On 6 July 1941, 3 Jews as communist were put to the shooting squad. On the same day, Chana Angenitzky, doctor's wife, was taken out to Marijampolė jail and killed. On 22 August 1941, around 113 male Jews were arrested and brought to Alytus. On 28 August, they were killed in Vidzgiris forest. On 1 September 1941, around 69 male Jews and a few women were taken out to Alytus. On 9 September, they were killed in Vidzgiris forest.

On 10 September 1941, the rest of Jews were gathered in the ghetto, a former soviet army barracks outside the cemetery, close to Simnas lake. On 12 September, all Jews were stripped down to underwear and barefoot escorted 3 km distance down to Pošnelė forest. Men were killed first and women after. German precise raport to high commandment: 68 elderly men, 197 women and 149 children, in total 414. Simnas Jews were killed by a shooting squad of 3 German and 40 Lithuanians. 7 Jews escaped massacre, 3 were caught and 4 survived. One of the survivors is Dovydas Gamskis, who later became a soviet clerk in the capital city. Two brothers, one of them Aba Gefen (Weinstein) later became an Israel diplomat. He wrote memoirs in the book "Defying the Holocaust: a Diplomat Report".

In 1965, a memorial was erected in a Jews massacre place in Pošnelė forest by local sculptor Vladas Krušna. Today, as of 2023, at least 34 people from Simnas and villages 15 km radius around Simnas, have Righteous Among the Nations honorific from Israel.

The synagogue 1941 - 1952 was closed. During the 1952 - 1984 period, the building was turned into a Cultural centre. In 1985, it was converted to a sport school and finally closed in 2014. In 2016, local authorities put the building up for sale, but after a protest of the Jews community and Cultural heritage department, the sale was suspended. Now the synagogue is derelict and stands as a silent blame to society.
