= Aaron James (organist) =

Charles Aaron James FRCCO
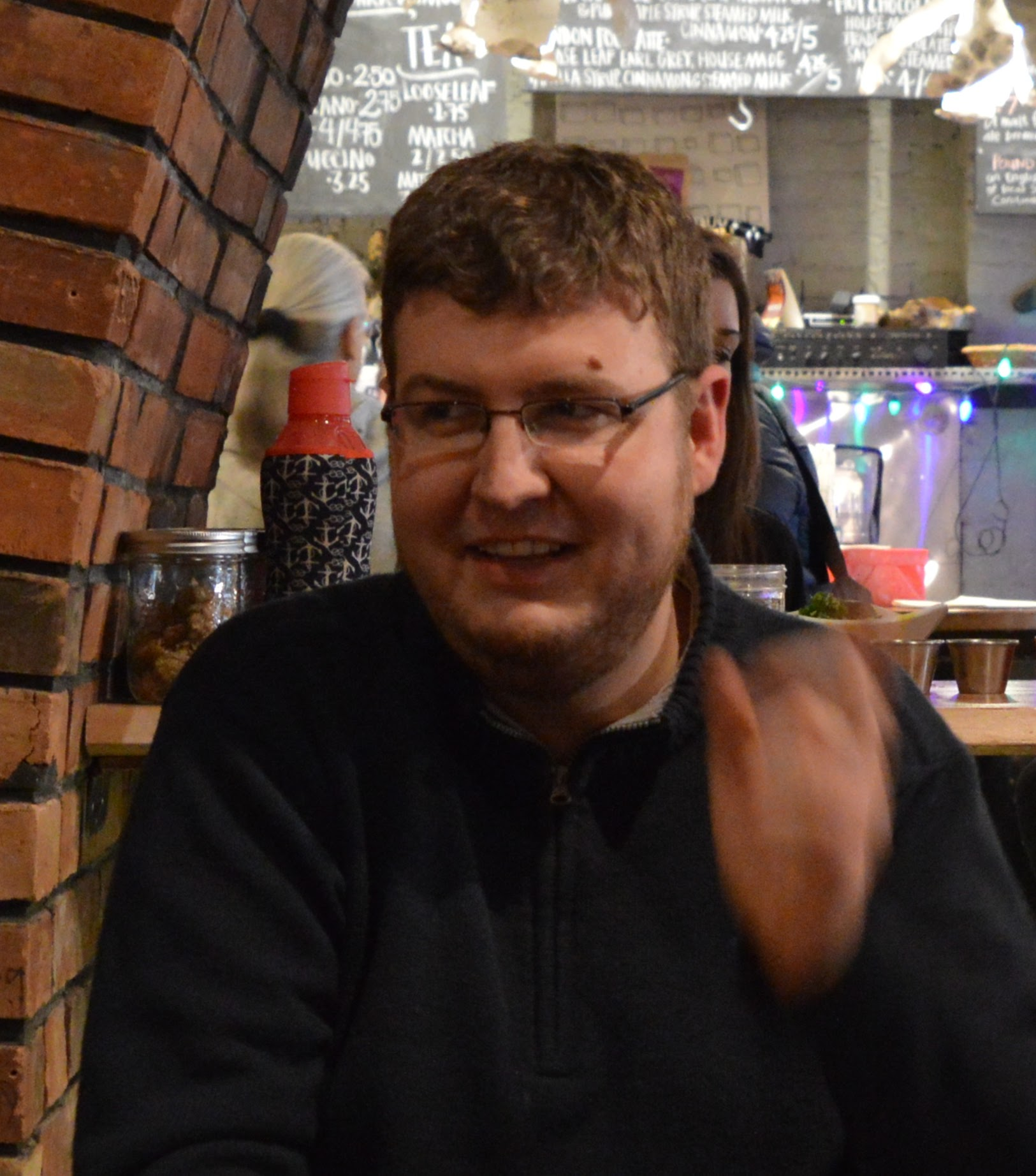
- Born: 1 September 1986 (age 40); Toronto, Ontario, Canada
- Other names: Aaron James; C. Aaron James
- Occupation: organist

Academic background
- Education: Eastman School of Music; University of Western Ontario
- Thesis: Transforming the motet: Sigmund Salminger and the adaptation and reuse of Franco-Flemish polyphony in Reformation Augsburg (2016)
- Doctoral advisor: Honey Meconi

Academic work
- Discipline: musicologist
- Institutions: St. Philip's Seminary; University of Toronto
- Main interests: Early music; Renaissance music; Benedictus Appenzeller

Charles Aaron James FRCCO (born 1 September 1986) is a Canadian musicologist, organist, pianist and composer.

== Early life and education ==
Aaron James was born in Toronto, Ontario. He studied organ performance at the University of Western Ontario, earning a Bachelor of Music in 2009. He attended the Eastman School of Music at the University of Rochester, where he completed a Master of Music in Organ Performance and Literature in 2011, a Doctor of Musical Arts in Organ Performance and Literature in 2015, and a Doctor of Philosophy in musicology in 2016.

James became a Fellow of the Royal Canadian College of Organists by examination in 2012, having received a first in the RCCO National Organ Playing Competition the previous year. He studied organ with Paul Merritt of the University of Western Ontario, as well as with Hans Davidsson and Edoardo Bellotti of the Eastman School of Music.

== Career ==
James served as Director of Music at St Mary's Church in Auburn, New York, where he reinaugurated the parish's restored 1890 Carl Barckhoff pipe organ. He also taught music history and theory at the University of Rochester. In 2017, James became the organist and director of music at the Holy Family Roman Catholic Church in Toronto, where he directs a children's choir, the professional Toronto Oratory Choir, and the St. Philip's Seminary Schola Cantorum. He also teaches organ literature for the Faculty of Music at the University of Toronto.

James is also a performer of contemporary music, having given national or world premieres of new compositions, including works by Emily Hall, Martin Herchenröder, Michael Nyman, Daniel Ochoa and Kyle Quarles. He also performs on the piano.
