= Raymond J. de Souza =

Canadian Catholic priest and columnist (born 1971)

The Reverend Raymond J. de Souza
- Church: Catholic

Orders
- Ordination: 20 July 2002 by Anthony Giroux Meagher

Personal details
- Born: 17 June 1971 (age 55) Sarnia, Ontario, Canada
- Education: University of Cambridge; Queen's University; St. Philip's Seminary; Pontifical North American College; Pontifical University of the Holy Cross

Raymond Joseph de Souza (born 17 June 1971) is a Canadian columnist for the National Post newspaper, and was the founding editor-in-chief of Convivium Magazine before it ceased publication. He also writes columns for the National Catholic Register, the Catholic Herald, and The Catholic Register. He was ordained into the priesthood in 2002 for the Archdiocese of Kingston, Ontario, and is the pastor of Holy Cross Church in Kemptville.

De Souza teaches at Queen's University at Kingston in the Department of Economics and previously at the Duncan MacArthur Faculty of Education, and is also chaplain of the Queen's football team, the Golden Gaels. Despite his involvement with the Queen's football team, De Souza is well known to be an avid indoorsman.

De Souza has completed a Master of Public Administration in public policy at Queen’s University, and a Masters of Philosophy in development economics at the University of Cambridge. His theological training was at St. Philip's Seminary in Toronto and at the Pontifical North American College, and the Pontifical University of the Holy Cross in Rome. He has been a Senior Fellow of Massey College at the University of Toronto since 2016.

He was born in Sarnia, Ontario, Canada on 17 June 1971. His parents were Indians born in Kenya and his grandparents were from Goa in Portuguese India.

He was described by George Weigel, a well-known Catholic author and papal biographer, as "Canada's finest Catholic commentator".

== External page ==
- Official website
- Columns Page for The Catholic Thing
