= Aaron James =

Aaron James may refer to:

- Aaron James (basketball) (born 1952), American basketball player
- Aaron James (American football) (born 1979), American college football coach
- Aaron James (Australian footballer) (born 1976), Australian rules footballer
- Aaron James (English footballer) (born 2005), English association football defender
- Aaron James (organist) (born 1986), Canadian organist and musicologist
- Aaron James, American who received the world's first whole-eye transplant in 2023
