= St. Philip's Seminary =

Catholic seminary in Toronto, Canada

Coordinates: 43.63780°N 79.43441°W

St. Philip's Seminary - The Oratory of St. Philip Neri
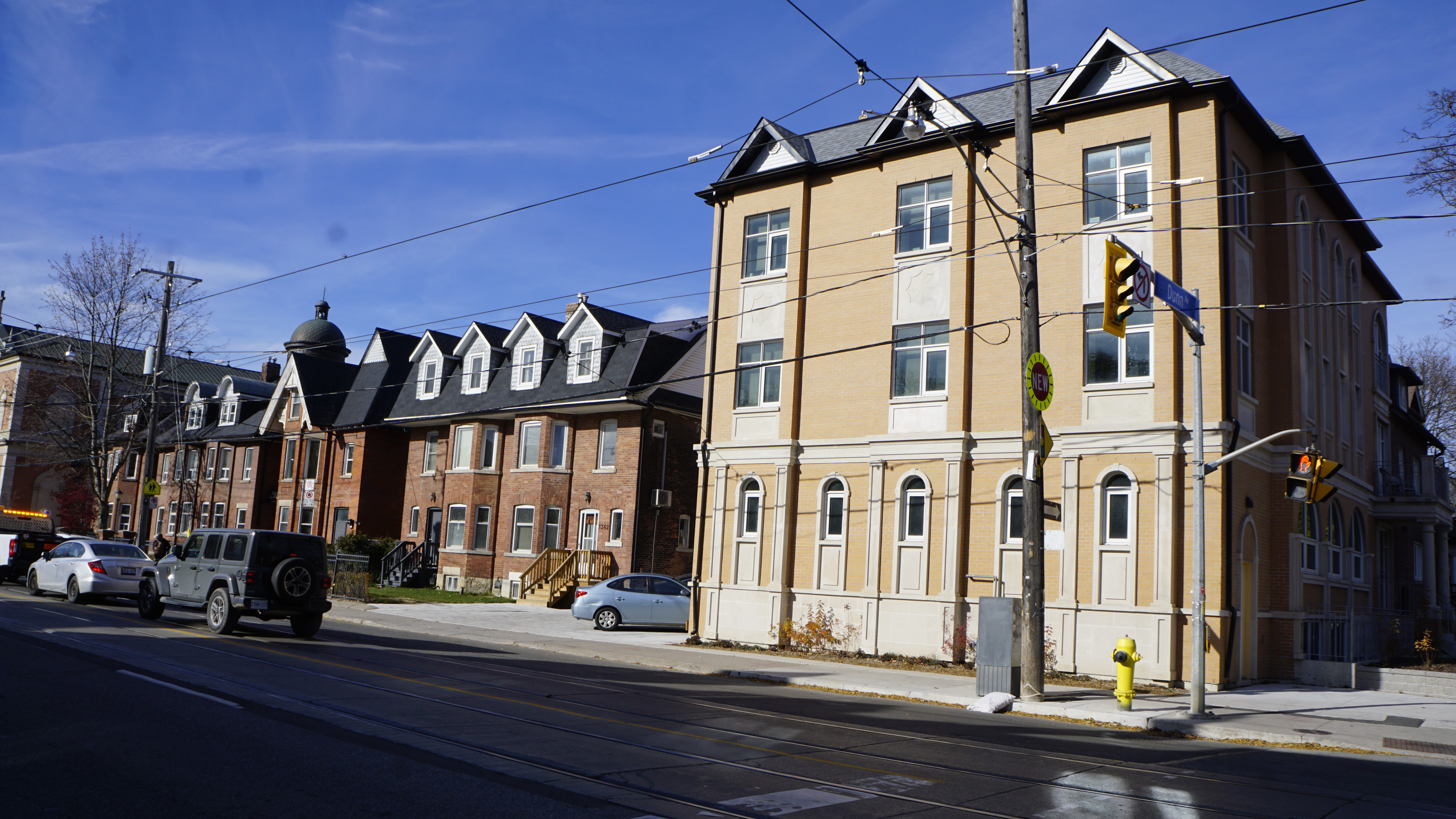
- Motto: Domus Mea Domus Orationis Vocabitur
- Type: Diocesan Seminary
- Established: 1984
- Affiliations: Holy Family Roman Catholic Church, Parkdale, St. Vincent de Paul Roman Catholic Church (Toronto)
- Religious affiliation: Roman Catholic
- Rector: Very Rev. Paul Pearson, Superior of the Oratory
- Dean: Very Rev. Paul Pearson, Superior of the Oratory
- Location: Toronto, ON, Canada
- Campus: Urban
- Colours: Blue and White
- Website: www.oratory-toronto.org

Saint Philip's Seminary is an apostolate of the Toronto Oratory, a Catholic society of apostolic life. It has been authorized to grant degrees by the province of Ontario. It accepts students for the priesthood who are sponsored by their diocese or by their religious order.

== History ==
The Philosophy Division of Saint Philip's Seminary was founded in 1986, Gerald Emmett Cardinal Carter requested Fr. Jonathan Robinson, C.O. to provide a place for the philosophical preparation of seminarians for the Archdiocese of Toronto, especially those in residence at Serra House, the archdiocesan house of discernment. In the fall of 1988, a residential program providing intellectual training, spiritual and personal formation was made available to seminarians from Dioceses and Religious Communities. In 2007, a three-year course of studies with an expanded set of degrees was provided at the request of the Archdiocese of Toronto and St. Augustine's Seminary. The Congregation for Education in January 2011 instituted the three-year course of philosophical studies as the norm for seminarians. From its beginning, St. Philip's Seminary was staffed by the Oratorians from the next door Toronto Oratory; they continues to operate the seminary.

== Principles ==
- Seminarians need a program of philosophy of a high intellectual calibre, explicitly directed towards the subsequent study of theology;
- Seminarians need a program of formation focussing upon the development of a clear understanding of and a deep love for the priestly vocation.

== Status ==
The seminary has trained men for Roman Catholic priesthood and provided continuing education courses for adults in matters relating to the Roman Catholic faith since its inception. However, the Ontario legislature officially recognized the seminary as a degree-granting institution through the passage "An Act respecting The Oratory of Saint Philip Neri, 1990".

== Academic programs ==
- Bachelor of Catholic Thought (2 years)
- Bachelor of Thomistic Thought (3 or 4 years)
- Master of Theology (3 years)
