= Toronto Oratory =

Catholic community of priests in Canada

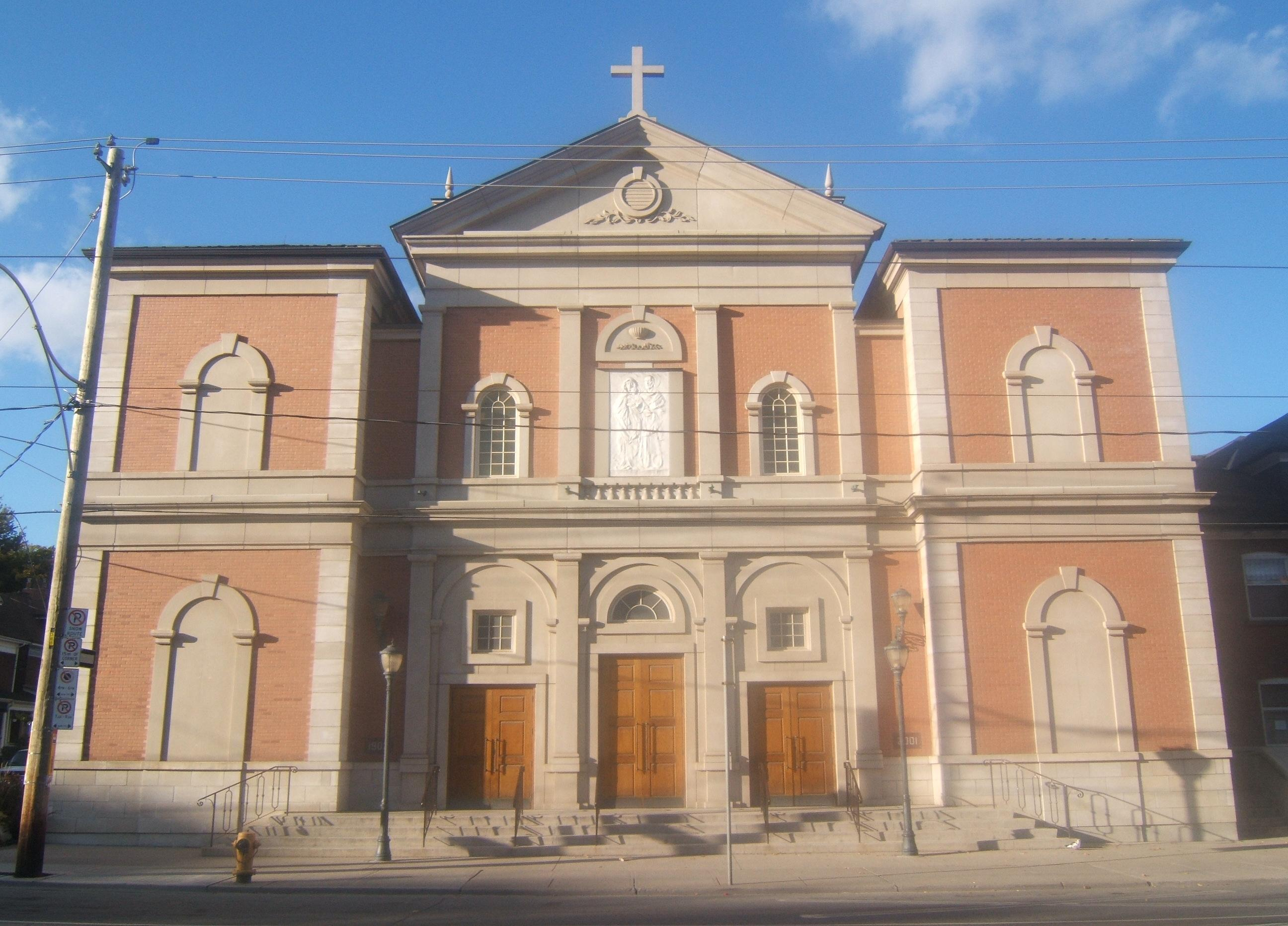
- Holy Family Roman Catholic Church, Parkdale is the main church of the Toronto Oratory

Monastery information
- Order: Oratory of Saint Philip Neri
- Established: 1976 (as the Montreal Oratory)
- Diocese: Toronto
- Controlled churches: Holy Family (Toronto), St Vincent de Paul (Toronto)

People
- Founder: Fr Jonathan Robinson
- Archbishop: Francis Leo
- Important associated figures: Fr Paul Pearson (Provost)

Architecture
- Website: www.oratory-toronto.org

The Toronto Oratory is a Catholic community of priests living under the rule of life established by its founder, Philip Neri (1515-1595). It is housed next to the Holy Family Church in Toronto, Ontario, Canada.

== History ==
In the early 1970s, Fr Jonathan Robinson, at that time a priest of the Archdiocese of Montreal, gathered together several young men to live as a pious community considered to be under the patronage and inspiration of St Philip Neri. On 1 November 1975 (Solemnity of All Saints), the Holy See gave its approval to this community and thereby erected the Montreal Oratory. In 1979, the Apostolic Visitor of the Oratory recommended that the Oratory be transplanted to Toronto. At the invitation of Cardinal Carter, the Oratory moved to Toronto and was put in charge of Holy Family Church. In 1995 they were asked to take over the neighbouring parish of St Vincent de Paul on Roncesvalles Avenue. In 1997, Holy Family Church burnt down, and the Oratory used St Vincent's as their main church until the new Holy Family was finished in 2001. In 2022 the Toronto Oratory Web site reported ten priests, two lay brothers, and four brother in priestly formation, making it the largest English-speaking Oratory.

== Oratorian Fathers ==
The Oratorian Fathers are a congregation of secular priests living a community life together voluntarily without having taken vows. Religious activities include several masses offered each day, officiating at weddings and funerals, and Catholic priestly services such as hearing confessions.

== See also ==
- Holy Family Roman Catholic Church, Parkdale
- St Vincent de Paul Roman Catholic Church, Toronto
