= St. Vincent de Paul Roman Catholic Church (Toronto) =

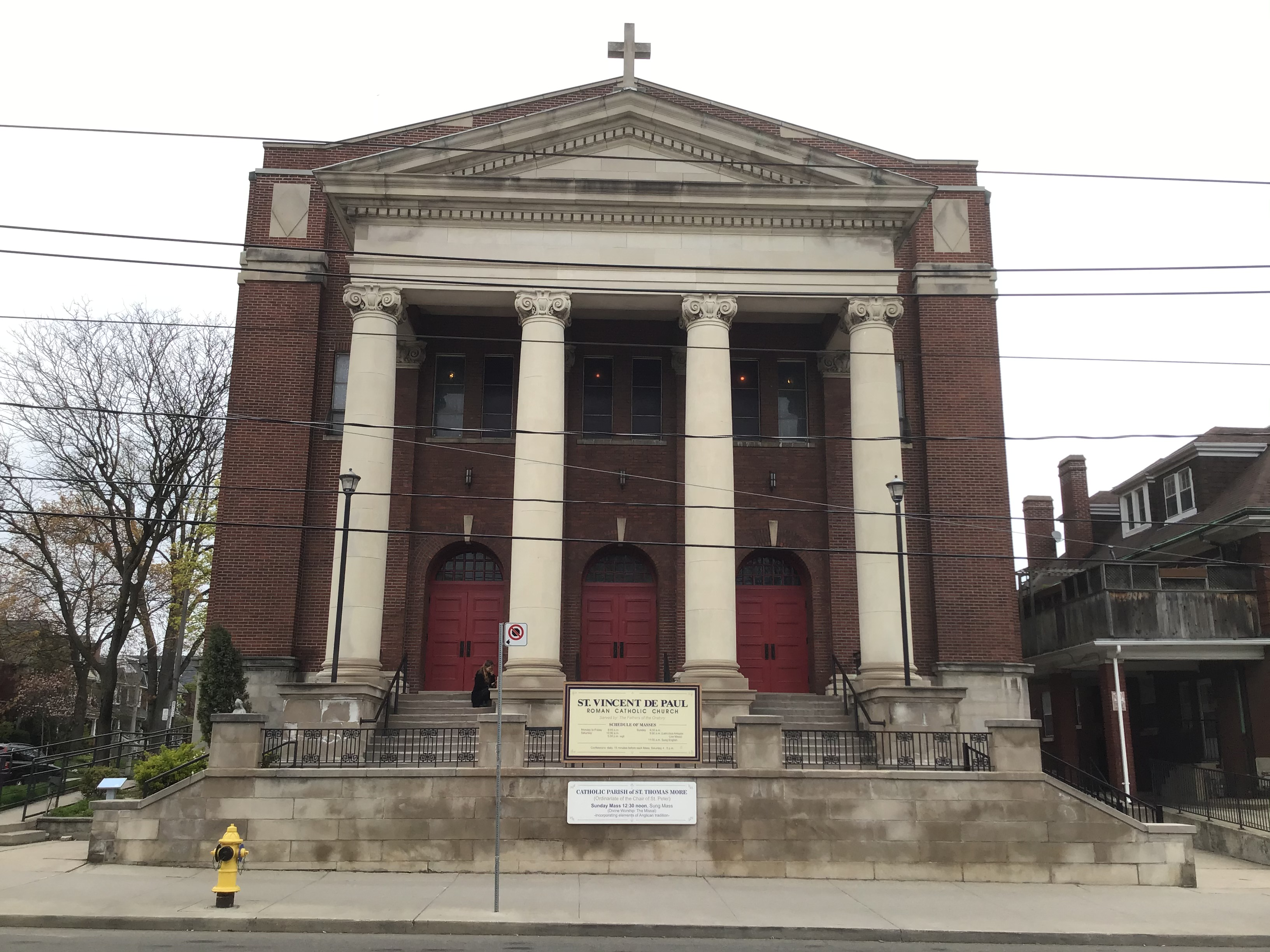
- St. Vincent de Paul Church on Roncesvalles Ave.
- St. Vincent de Paul Roman Catholic Church
- 43°38′49.5″N 79°26′56.34″W
- Location: Toronto, Ontario
- Country: Canada
- Denomination: Roman Catholic
- Website: Oratory-Toronto.org

History
- Founded: 1914
- Dedication: St. Vincent de Paul

Administration
- Diocese: Archdiocese of Toronto

Clergy
- Pastor(s): Fr Daniel Utrecht, C.O.

St Vincent de Paul is a parish of the Roman Catholic Church in Toronto, Ontario, Canada, in the Archdiocese of Toronto. It has been served since 1995 by clergy of the Oratory of St. Philip Neri and St. Philip's Seminary who reside at their primary parish of Holy Family Roman Catholic Church, Parkdale. The parish church is located on Roncesvalles Avenue west of downtown Toronto, and also serves the Catholic Parish of St Thomas More, a congregation in the Personal Ordinariate of the Chair of Saint Peter.

== History ==
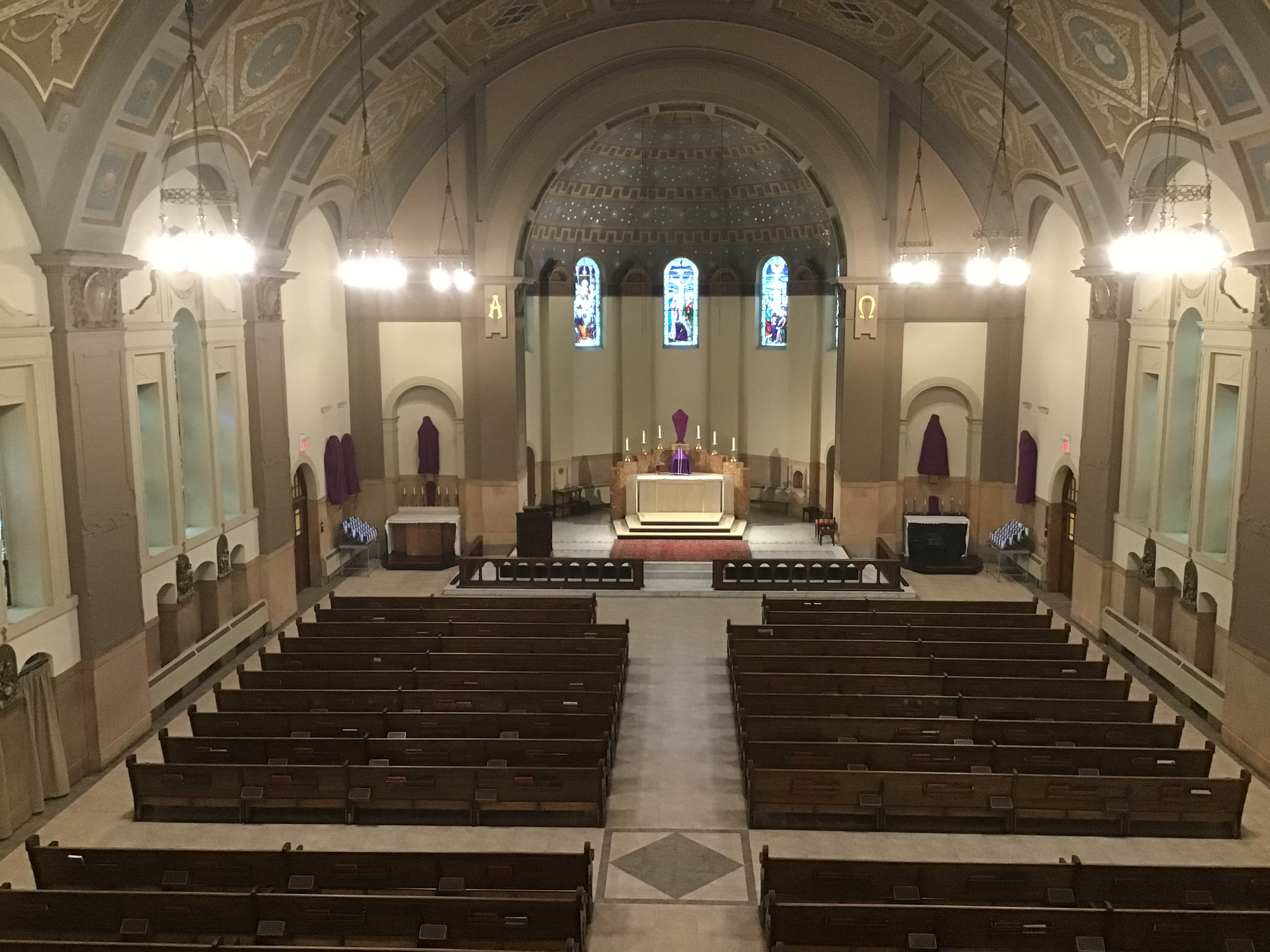
Interior (during Passiontide)

In 1900, Holy Family Church was created in the Parkdale neighbourhood, out of Toronto's original west end parish of St. Helen's, Brockton at a time when development was already spreading north from Parkdale to the new 'Howard Park' residential district. By 1914, at the end of the first large wave of non-British immigration to Toronto, many Catholics had arrived in the city and the population was considered sufficient for a second parish near Parkdale on Roncesvalles Ave which was developing as a commercial heart of the Howard Park neighbourhood.

The parish was initially intended to be called the Church of the Immaculate Conception, however another parish in Toronto, St Mary's on Bathurst Street, was already under that patronage. It was then decided that the parish would be named after the Apostle of Charity, St Vincent de Paul. The parish was established under Fr Launcelot Minehan in 1914 with the first Mass being celebrated on September 27, 1914. In the early days, the parish operated out of a store front on Roncesvalles Avenue, which operated as a church, school, and parish hall as needed. In early 1915, plans were drawn up for the new church building. Designed by Mr James Michael Cowan, the plans adopted elements from the Madeleine in Paris, France, but adapted to local circumstances and financial resources. The sod was turned by Fr Minehan on April 28 of 15 with Archbishop McNeil blessing the cornerstone on August 15 and dedicating the original basement church on October 24 of the same year. Due to the First World War and the accompanying financial hardships, the basement church would serve the social and religious needs of the parish for the next seven years.

In 1921, a committee was formed to discuss completion of the church and after consideration decided to begin construction the next year.

On Friday, September 14, 1923, the finished building would be opened to the neighbourhood. On the following Sunday, Archbishop McNeil would arrive to perform the dedication of the church.

During the first sixteen years, the parish had no rectory and Father Minehan lived first in the large apartment next door; later, he took an apartment at 266 Roncesvalles Avenue. The present location of the rectory was a tennis court which was the center of much of the social life of the parish. The tennis club which formed in 1923 not only organized tennis but also parish outings and drama productions. The tennis club was later moved to part of the present site of the St. Joseph's Health Centre.

In February 1931, Father G. Kirby, at the time rector of St. Michael’s Cathedral, was appointed Pastor of St. Vincent de Paul parish, He updated the parish's administrative ability and built a rectory, installed a Casavant organ in the Church, and began to retire the $100,000 debt of the parish. Monsignor Kirby was pastor for 28 years. The societies of the parish expanded, the school grew, the sports programmes sponsored by the parish involved many people; and from this community came many religious vocations and vocations to the priesthood. The newly renovated hall below the church was dedicated to Monsignor Kirby.

While St, Vincent’s was flourishing the Second World War, which disrupted the lives of so many, was destined to have a particular effect on the parish. Following the war, many displaced persons came from Europe to Canada and many came to the large cities. A new Polish parish, St. Casimir’s was formed in 1948 and built a Church also on Roncesvalles in 1952. As the children of the families who had lived in the neighbourhood grew, they moved to the suburbs and gradually the family homes were sold to new immigrants and refugees. The majority of the Catholics in the area were Polish and belonged to St. Casimir’s parish. It would be another thirty-five years before this would again begin to change.

While the number of parishioners was decreasing, there were still many needs to which response was given particularly to the poor and needy. Father Peter Vallely was pastor from 1968 to 1971 and inspired an active young peoples group. Father Chris Bennett succeeded him until 1979 and in that time updated the exterior of the church. Father Joe Driscoll was pastor until the Oblates of Mary Immaculate were asked to take the parish in 1985 and at the same time use the facilities to minister to the Native Peoples in Toronto. Father Driscoll was a person of great hospitality and during his pastorate welcomed the Maronite Catholics and priests into the parish from 1979 to 1983.

By the 1990s, the parish had become a centre for the Oblates' work with Toronto's native Canadian community. The site was poorly chosen for this as few native Canadians lived in the area and this work is now carried out at St. Anne's Parish in the Riverdale neighbourhood. In 1995, responsibility for the parish was given to the Toronto Oratory of Saint Philip Neri in addition to their running Holy Family, a parish they have been running since 1979 and at which they still live. With the extension of a general permission to celebrate the Extraordinary Form of the Mass through Quattuor abhinc annos and Ecclesia Dei and with the approval of Archbishop Aloysius Ambrozic, one weekly Sunday Mass in the Extraordinary Form started June 1, 1997.

== School ==
- St. Vincent de Paul Catholic Elementary School
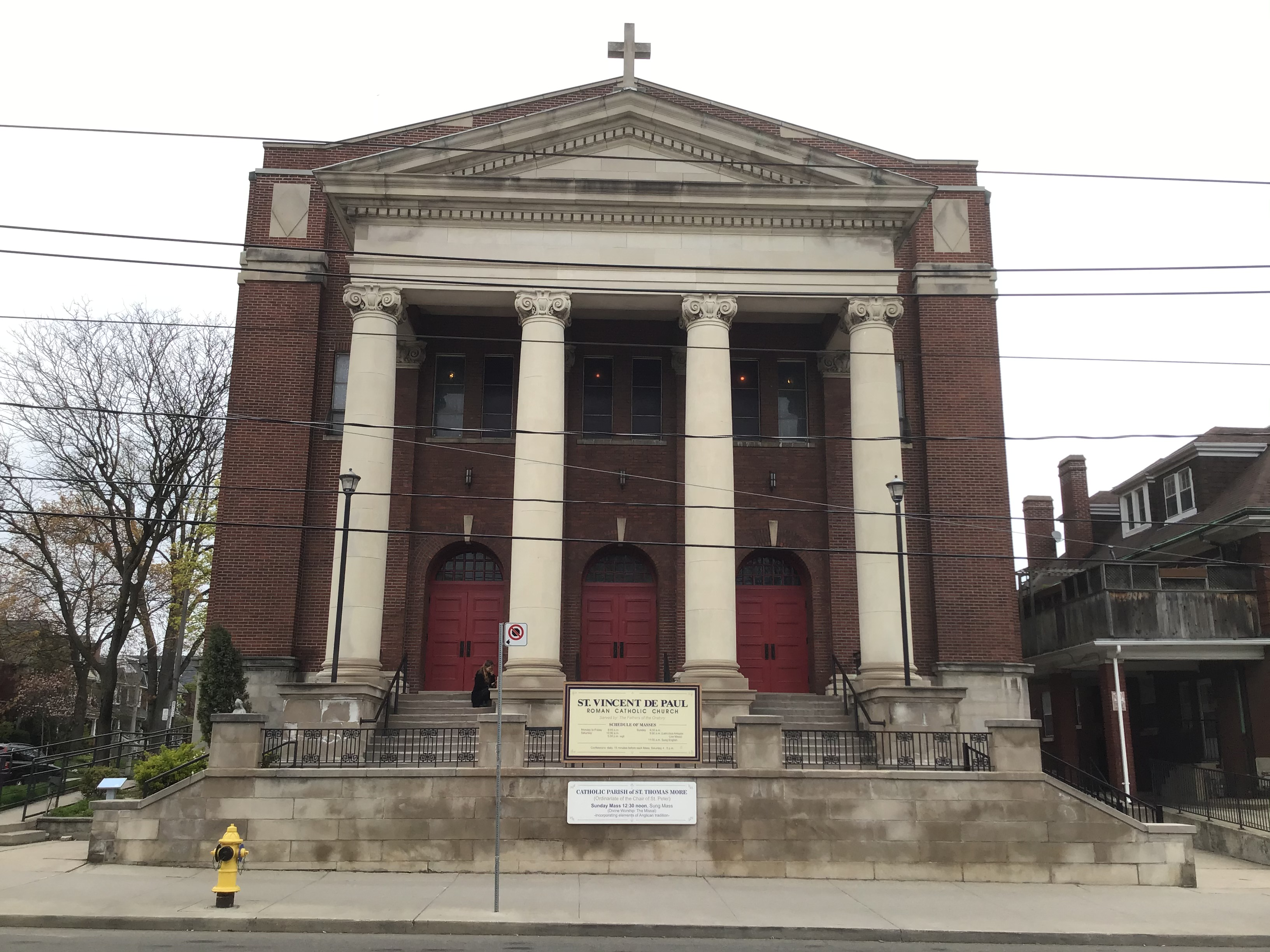
Exterior.

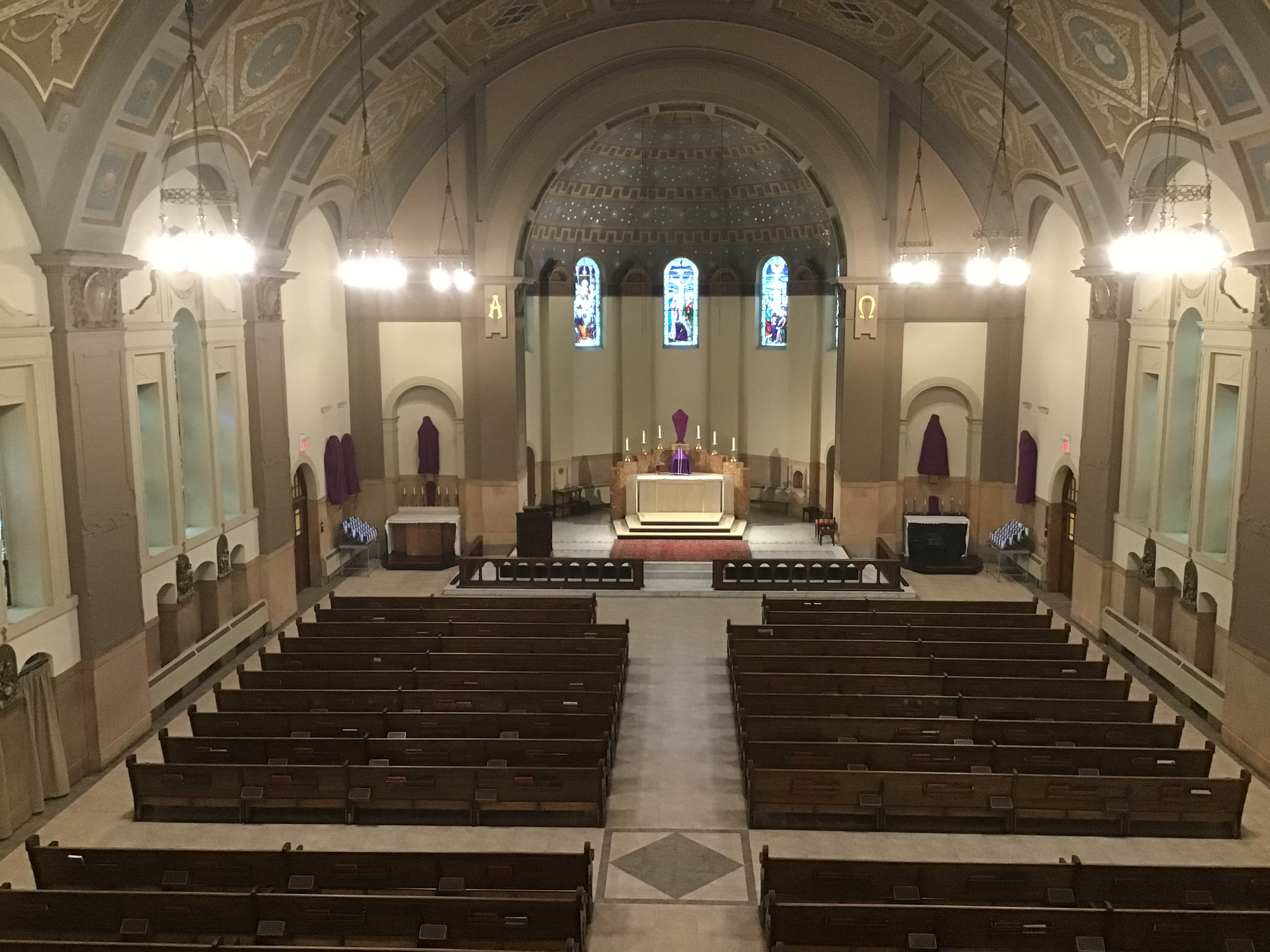
Interior in Passiontide

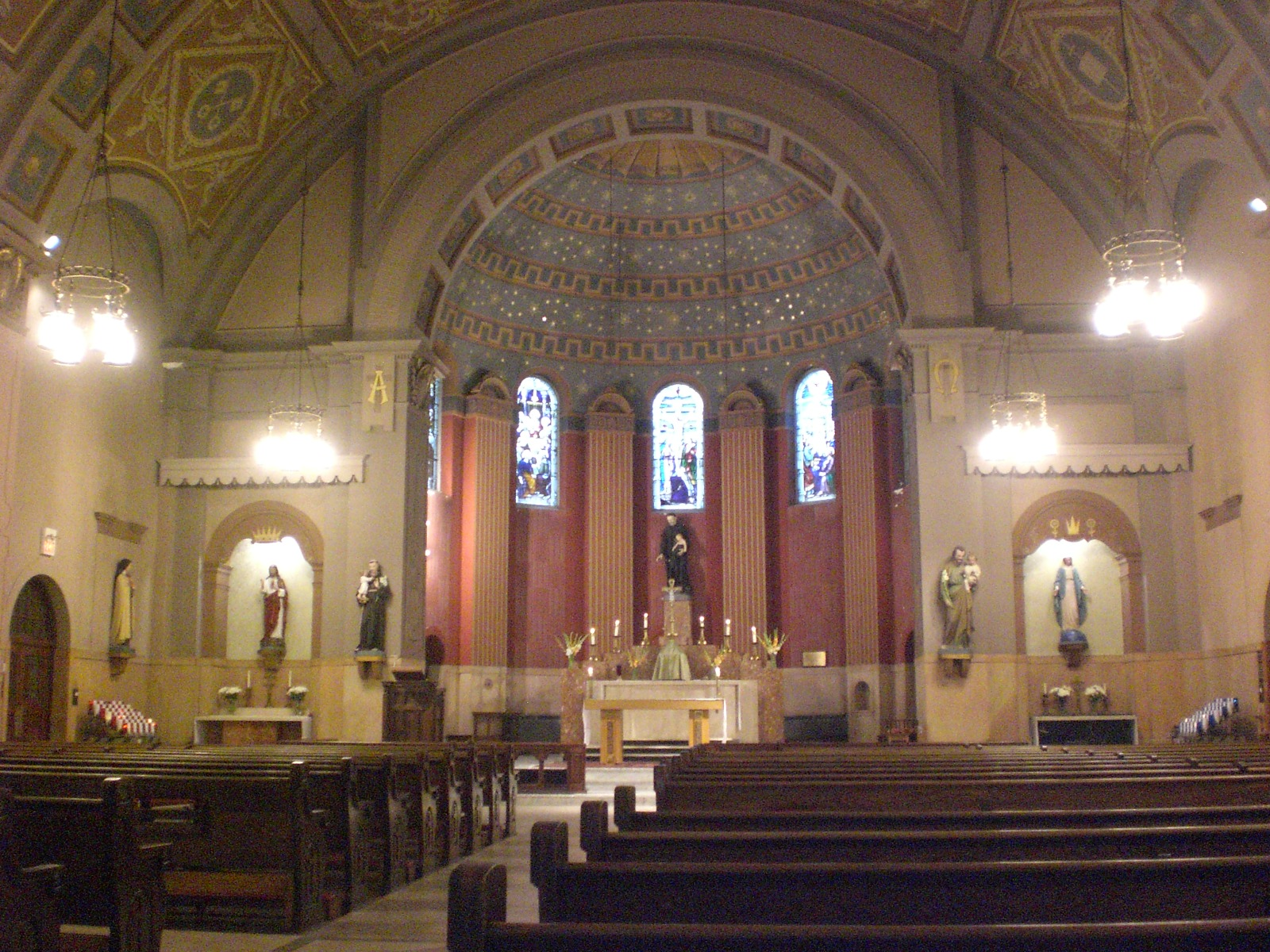
Interior, 2013.

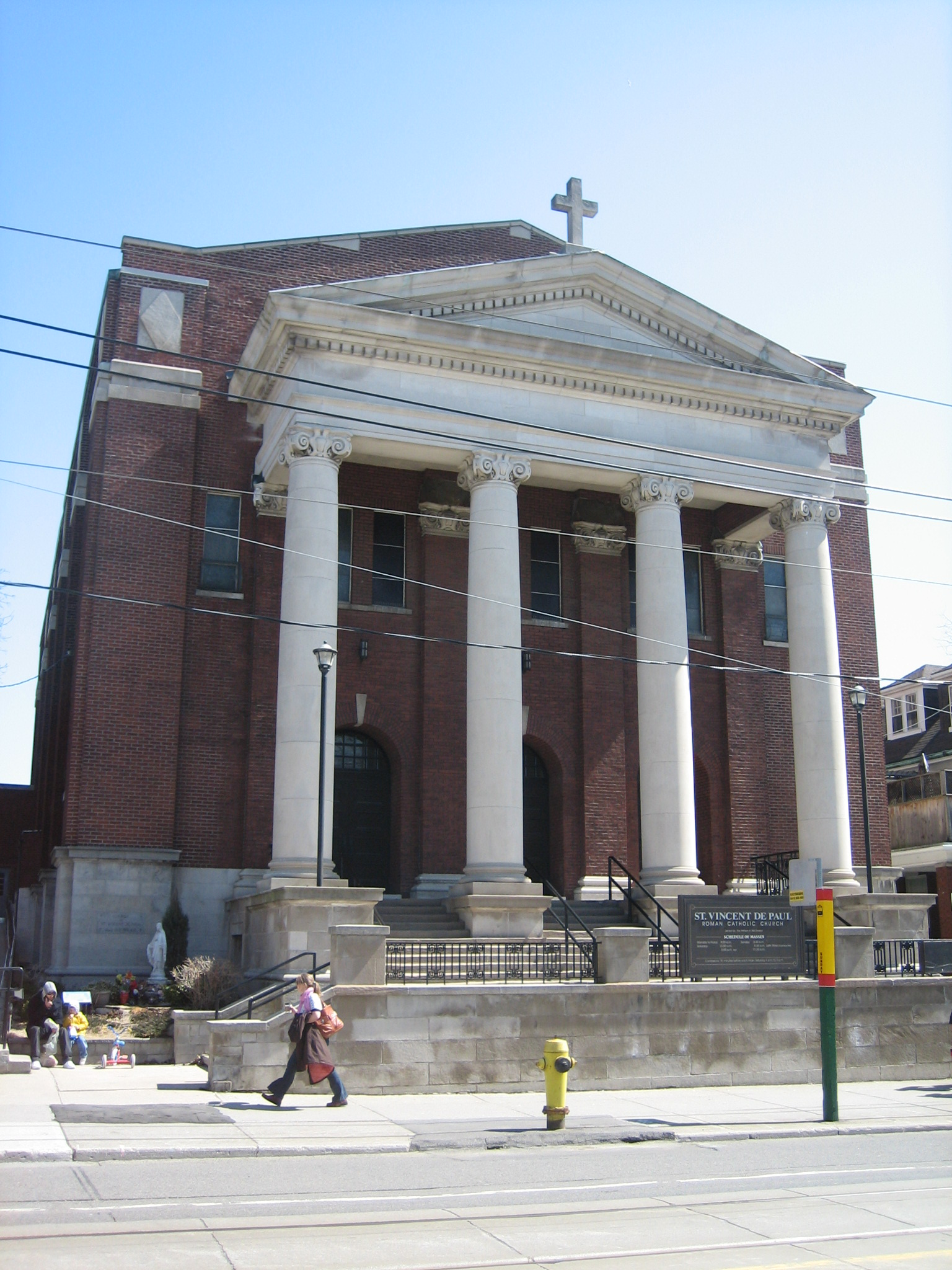
Exterior. 2009.

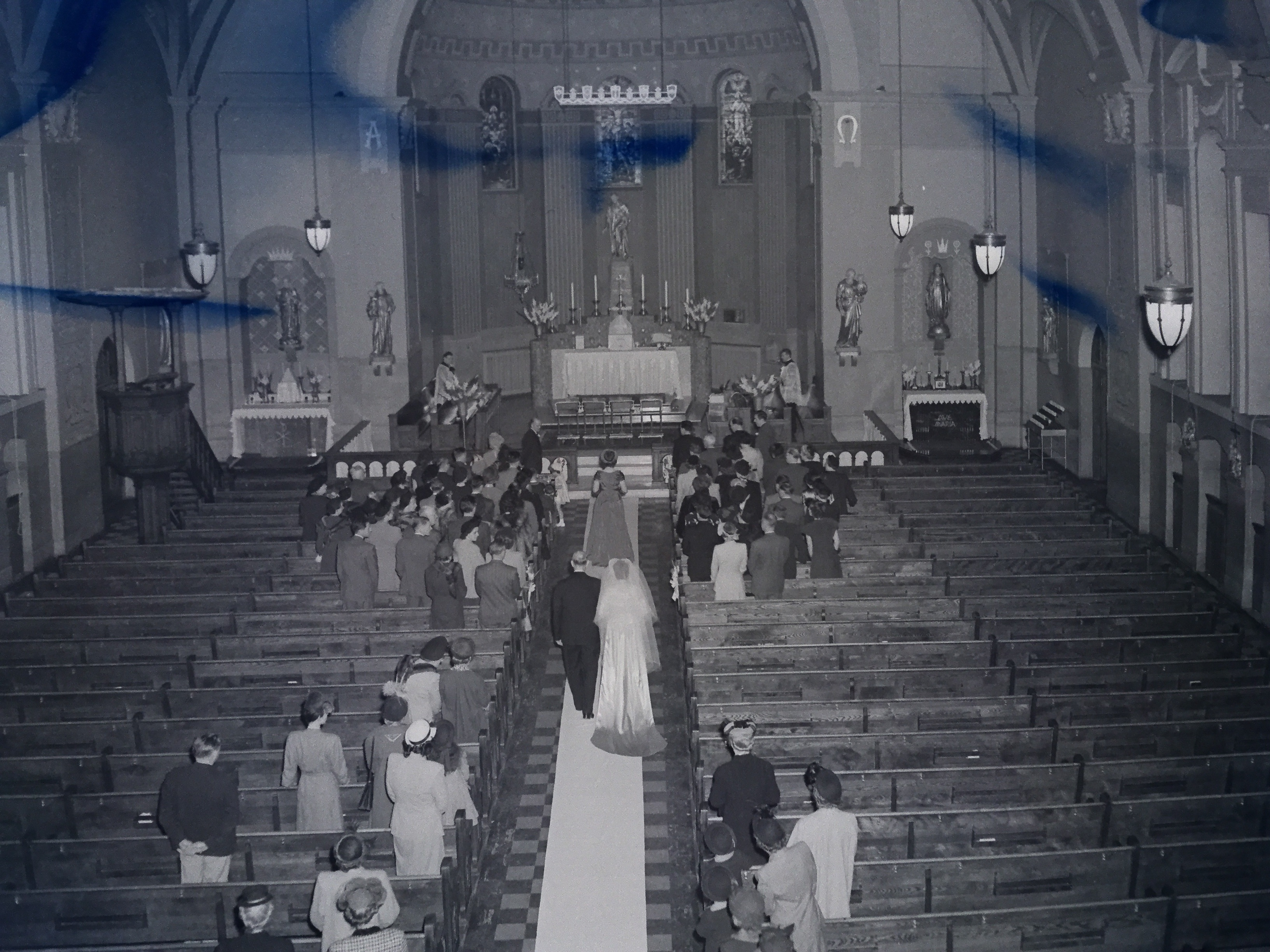
Interior at a wedding. 1949.

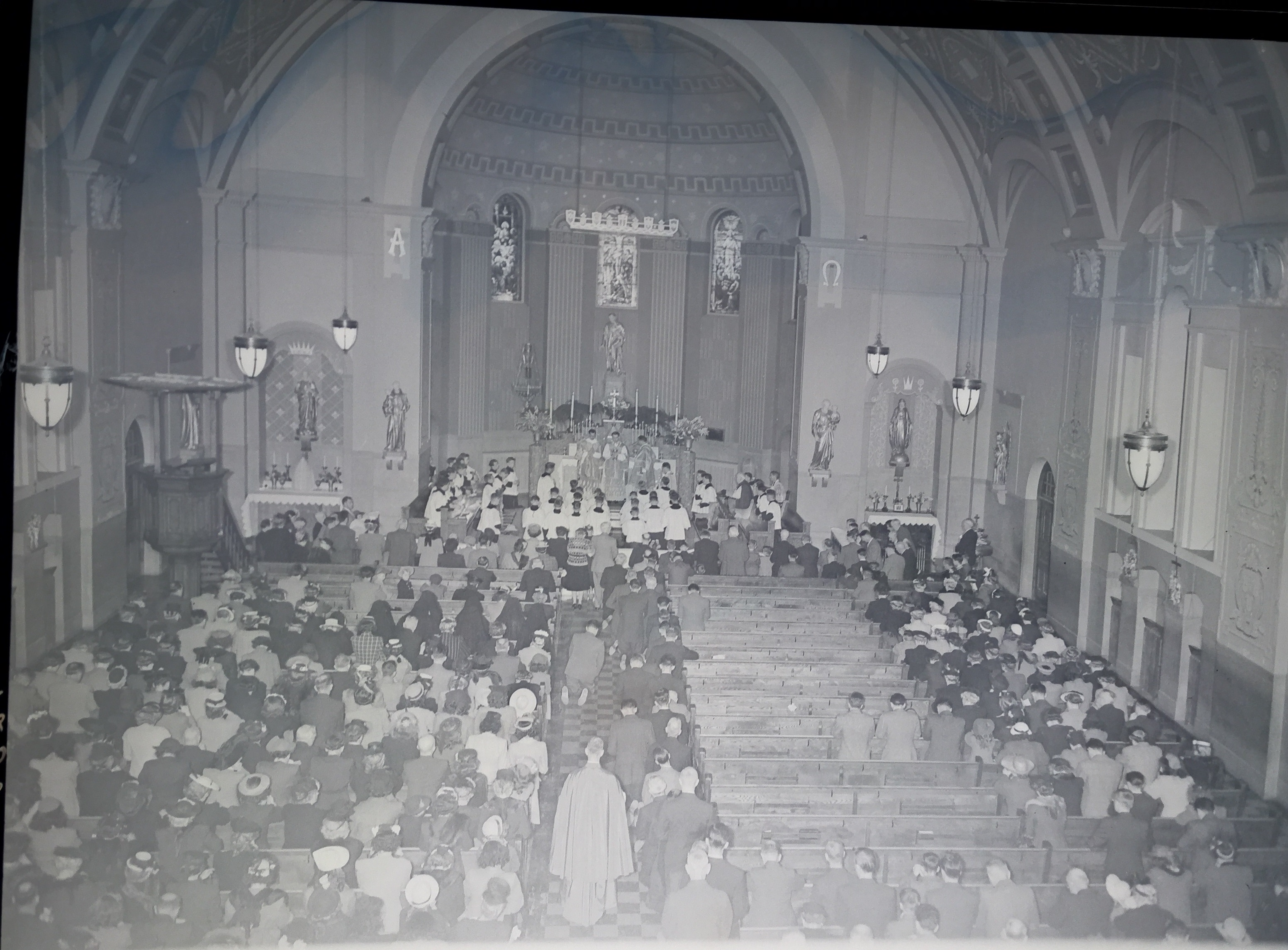
Interior at a First Mass, 1946.

== See also ==
- Oratory of St Philip Neri
- Roncesvalles, Toronto
- Holy Family Roman Catholic Church, Parkdale
- Roman Catholic Archdiocese of Toronto
