= Holy Family Roman Catholic Church (Toronto) =

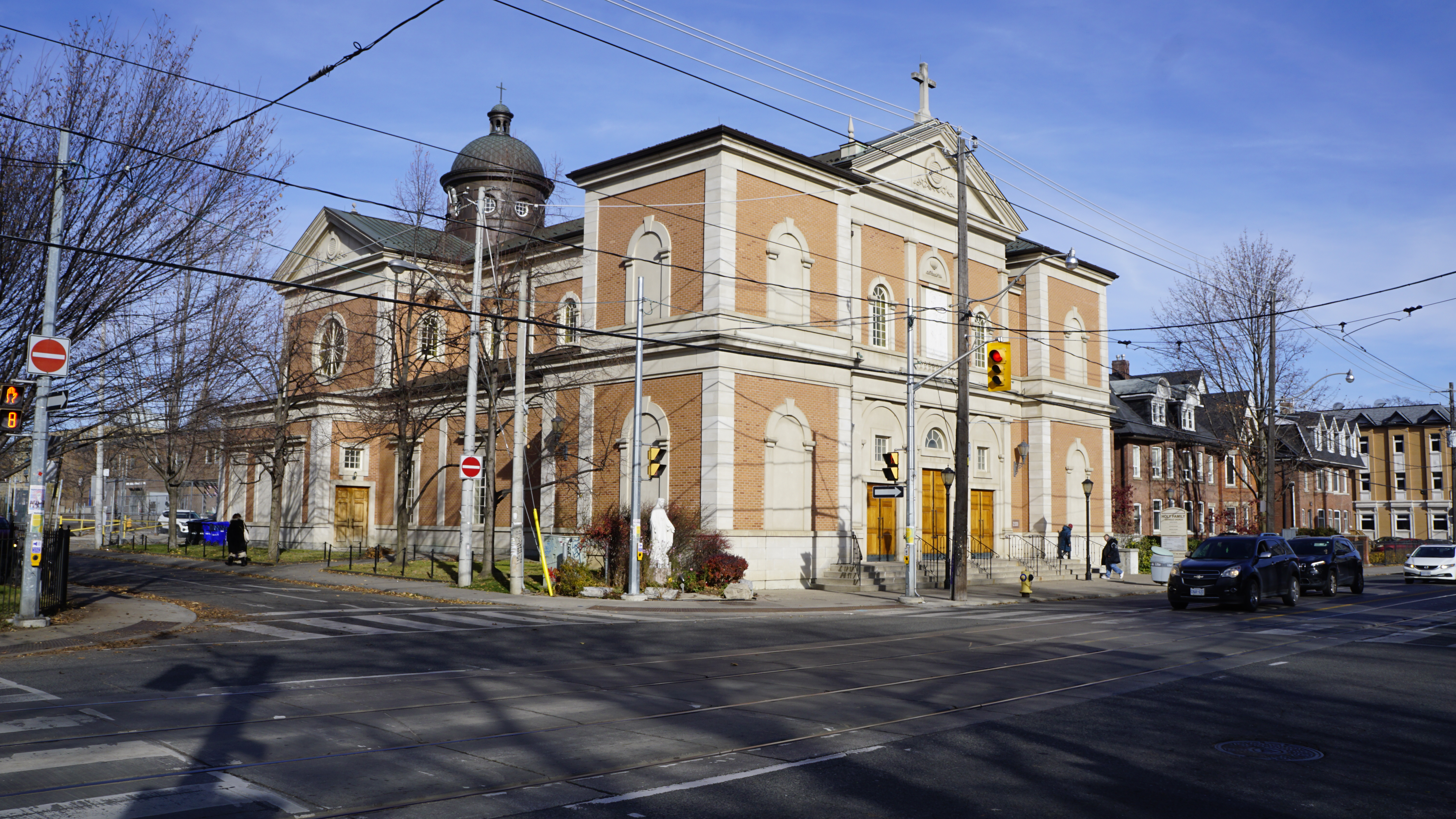
- The new Holy Family Church on King Street West

- Location within Toronto
- 43°38′16″N 79°26′04″W
- Location: Parkdale, Toronto
- Country: Canada
- Denomination: Roman Catholic
- Website: https://oratory-toronto.org/

History
- Founded: 1902
- Dedication: Holy Family

Administration
- Diocese: Archdiocese of Toronto

Clergy
- Pastor(s): Fr. Martin Hilbert, C.O.

Holy Family is a Roman Catholic church in Toronto's west end neighbourhood of Parkdale and within the Roman Catholic Archdiocese of Toronto. It has been served since 1979 by clergy of the Oratory of St Philip Neri who also run a seminary from the location.

== History ==
Although a village since 1879 with two Anglican churches, the wealthy Toronto suburb of Parkdale had few Catholic residents until after amalgamation with Toronto. Later, Holy Family would serve the local Catholic institutions on Queen Street (now the Queensway) that had been created in St. Helen's Parish in the 1870s during Parkdale's first period of growth as an independent village; Sacred Heart Orphanage (now St. Joseph's Health Centre) and Our Lady of Mercy Palliative Care Centre originally run by the Sisters of St. Joseph, that first opened in Toronto Architect John Howard's 'Sunnyside' home, as well as Our Lady of Charity convent and school for wayward girls (now demolished) that was opened out of Parkdale founder Captain O'Hara's 'West Lodge' home by the Good Shepherd Sisters.

From 1900, Holy Family existed as a mission church of St. Helen's, Brockton, with the pastor there, Fr. Walsh, travelling to Parkdale on Sundays to celebrate mass. Holy Family Roman Catholic Church was created out of St Helen's, Archbishop O'Connor laying the cornerstone for the new church on June 22, 1902; school was constructed behind the church at the same time. When the church was built, plans were already underway for new parishes to be carved out of Holy Family; St. Leo's (Mimico) existed as a 'mission' church of Holy Family until separating in 1909 taking the independent village of Swansea. Shortly after, in 1914, St. Vincent de Paul parish was created to serve the growing Howard Park (Roncesvalles) neighbourhood to the north of Parkdale.

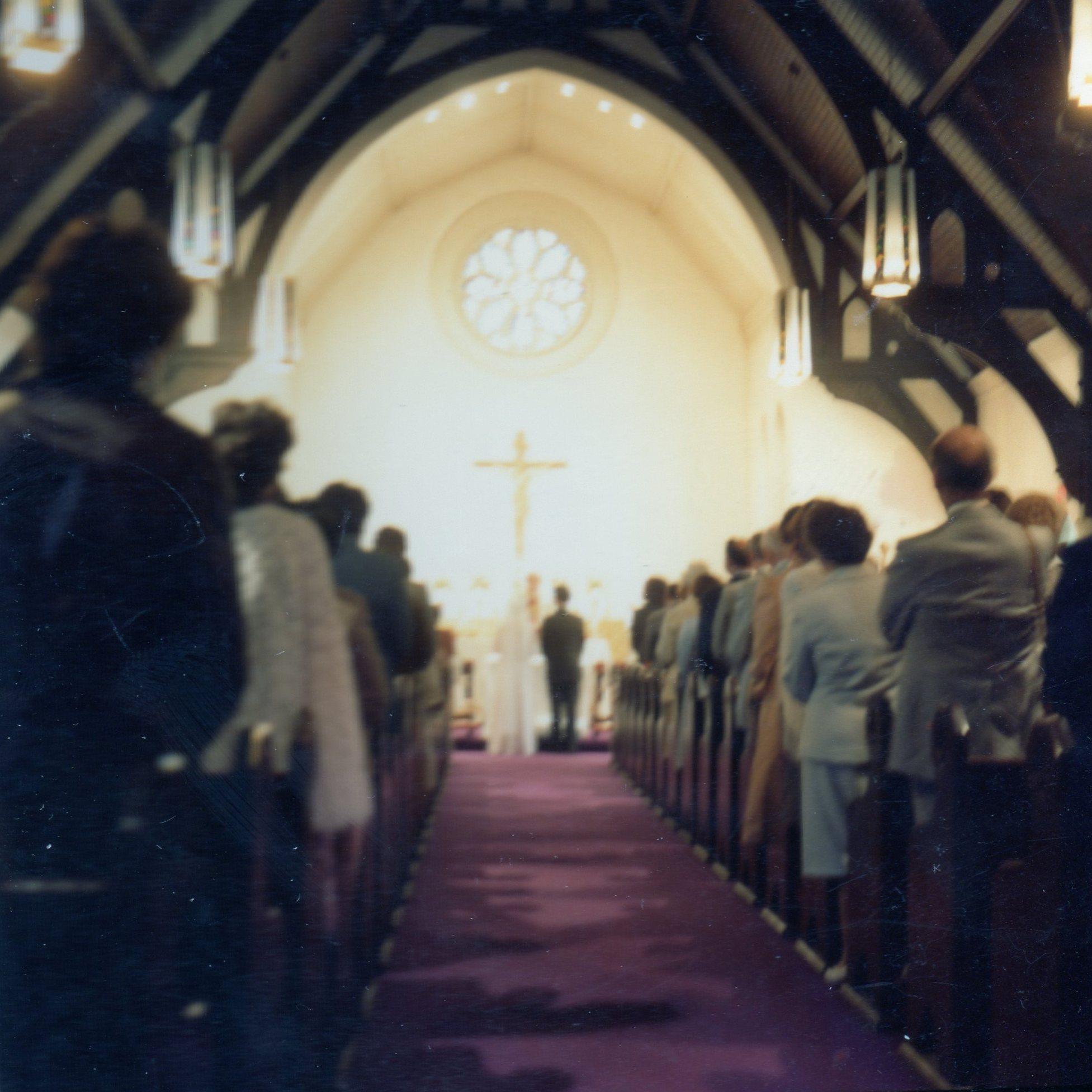
Interior of the old Holy Family (front)

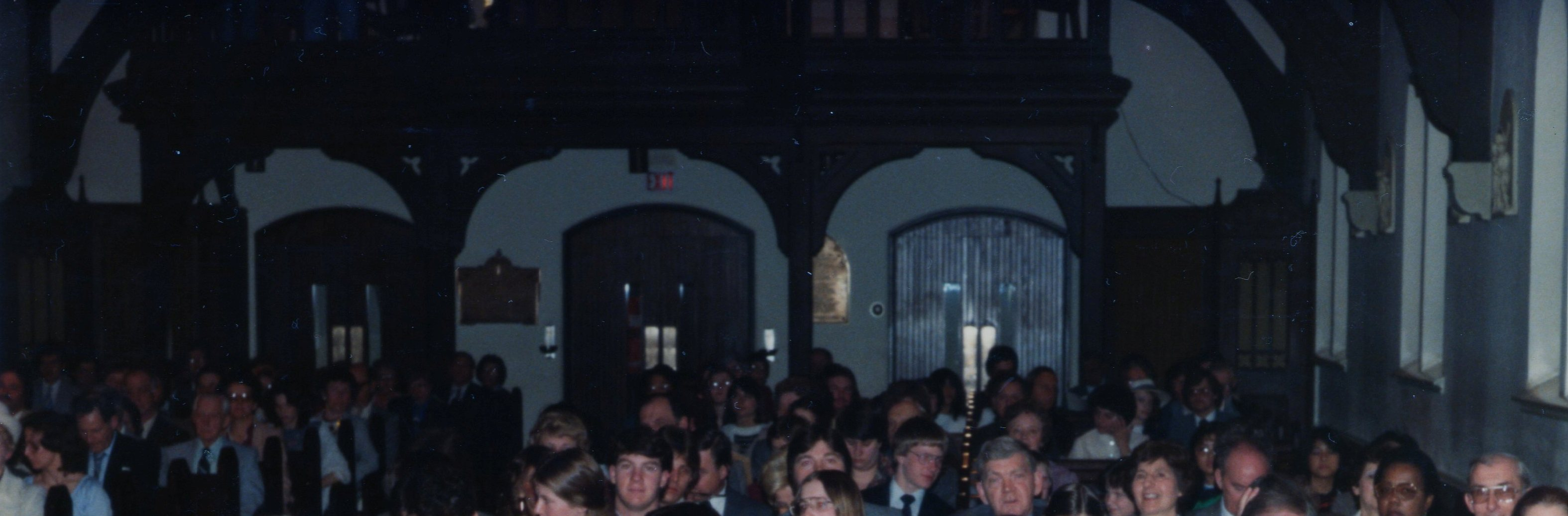
Interior of the old Holy Family (back)

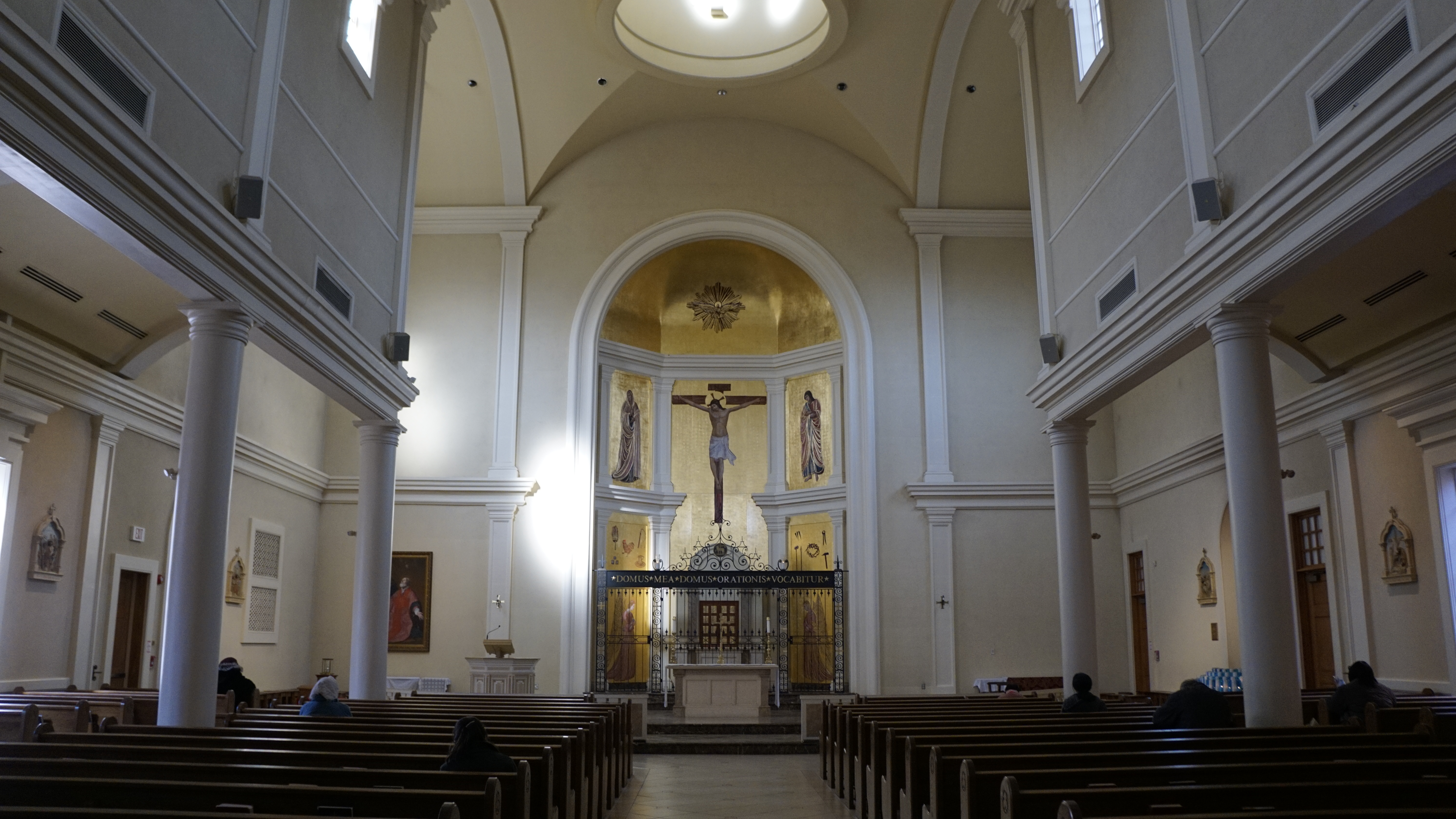
Interior of the new Holy Family (front)

For many years the parish was led by Monsignor Coyle who oversaw the growth of the parish during a time when Parkdale was urbanising with a continuing influx of Catholic residents as the first high-density apartments were built. Also prominent in the parish was long time organist Evaleen O'Donoghue Ferguson, daughter of politician Daniel John O'Donoghue as well as Parkdale MPP (1948–1951) Lloyd Fell (CCF). A history of the parish was written for its 50th anniversary, also an occasion when the parish celebrated the ordination of one of the many parishioners to receive the sacrament of Holy Orders.

After the death of Msgr. Coyle, Monsignor Brennan (Rector of St. Augustine's Seminary) was appointed pastor; he led the parish during a time of liturgical reforms in the Latin Rite. In the post war years Parkdale lost much of its affluence while it redeveloped as a high-density immigrant reception neighbourhood, leading to an exodus of many older residents and the closure of many Protestant churches because of declining membership. Holy Family weathered the changes which brought a great shift in the ethnic composition of the parish as older families moved out. Today the parish has a very large Filipino community.

Recent History

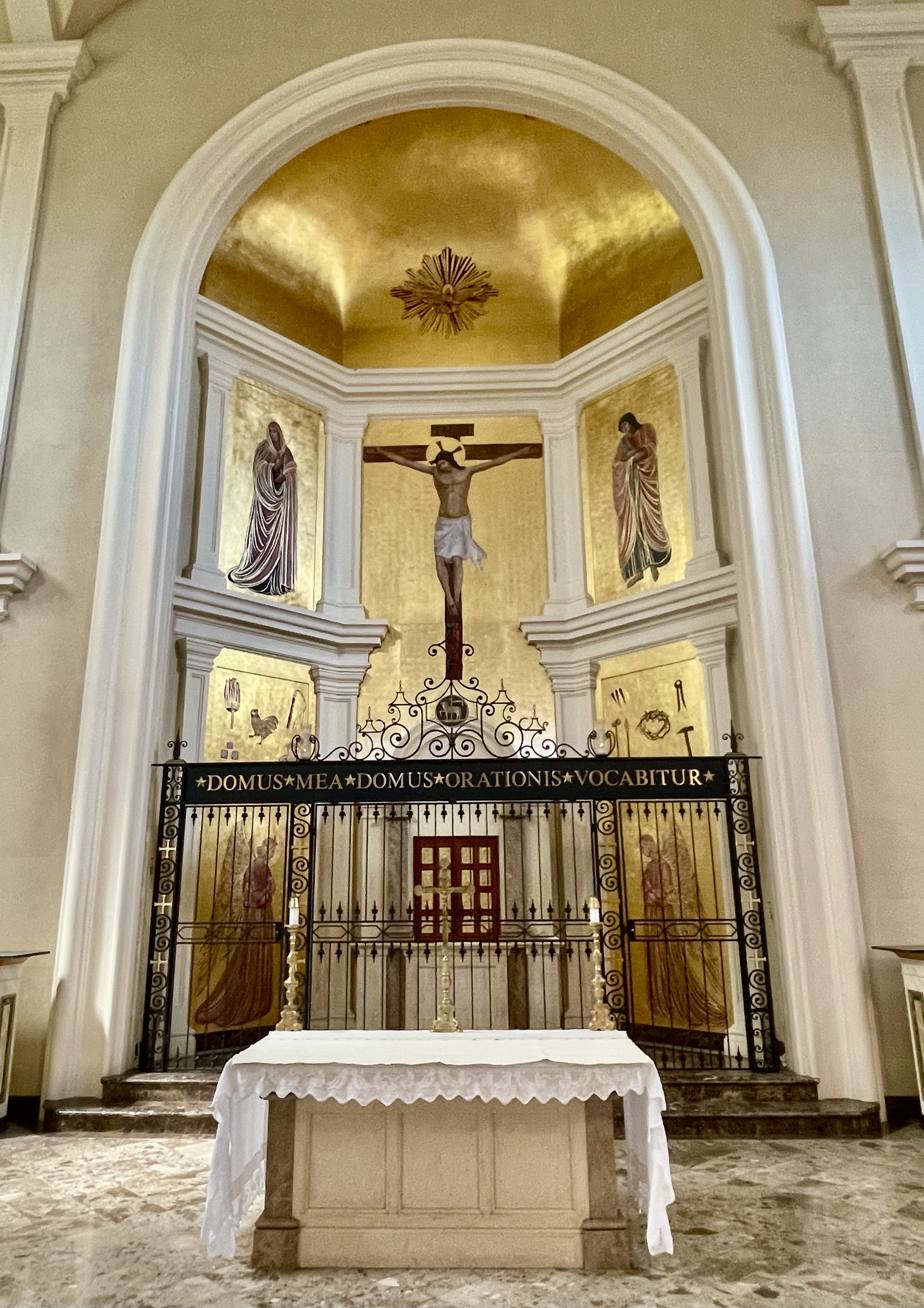
The sanctuary of Holy Family, Toronto, Ontario.

In 1979, the three priests of the Oratory of Saint Philip Neri in Montreal, led by Fr. Jonathan Robinson, were invited by Toronto's Archbishop to move to Holy Family parish. The fathers of the Oratory also opened a seminary, purchasing many homes along King St to create a complex of connected buildings; this seminary has provided a constant stream of new clergy for the parish. Holy Family parish also works with the needy in Parkdale, opening St. Philip's Centre in the 1980s. In 1995 the Oratorians at Holy Family were given the additional care for the declining St Vincent de Paul parish to which some of them moved for a time. In 1997, a fire destroyed the original Holy Family church and in the following year's funds were raised to build a new church on the site as the congregation worshipped at Holy Family School. Work on the new church commenced on October 7, 1999, and the dedication was performed on February 25, 2001. The new church was designed in the Roman Renaissance style by Brian Atkins of Atkins Architect, Mississauga with Mauro Franzoni as Project Architect. The Oratorian priests of Holy Family, having maintained a tradition of the weekly celebration of the mass in Latin since their arrival, in 2007 made the parish one of a small number of churches in the Archdiocese of Toronto to begin celebrating a daily Tridentine Mass. After receiving a generous donation in 2018, the Holy Family Parish commissioned Ken Woo, a New York City based artist, to complete a series of apsidal paintings for the sanctuary of the Church.

== Pastors ==
- Fr. David Roche, C.O. (former Pastor)
- Fr. Martin Hilbert, C.O. (current Pastor)

Priests in the parish

- Fr. Jonathan Robinson, C.O. (Founder of Toronto Oratory) – died 2020.
- Fr. Daniel Utrecht, C.O. (also current Pastor of St. Vincent de Paul)
- Fr. Juvenal Merriell, C.O.
- Fr. Paul Pearson, C.O.
- Fr. Thomas Trottier, C.O.
- Fr. Marco Guillen, C.O.
- Fr. Alexander Griffiths, C.O.
- Fr. Christopher Huynh, C.O.
- Fr. Derek Cross, C.O.
- Fr. Michael Eades, C.O.
- Fr. Philip Cleevely, C.O. (came from Birmingham, U.K. in 2011)

== 'Children' Parishes ==
- St. Leo's
- St. Vincent de Paul

== School ==
- Holy Family Elementary School and Community Centre Founded 1902

== See also ==
- Parkdale
- Roman Catholic Archdiocese of Toronto
