= Master of Religious Education =

Academic degree

The Master of Religious Education (MRE) is a terminal academic degree in preparation for professional teaching ministry, usually offered by Christian institutions. The curriculum includes two years of theological study and sometimes a thesis. Although related to many Master of Arts in religious education or Master of Theology degrees, the primary focus of the MRE is to prepare individuals for teaching, as such often requiring previous experience or training in education in order to enroll. Often, the difference in title is based on the history, philosophy or policies of the institution offering the degree. In North America, institutions that offer accredited MRE programs are usually approved by the Association of Theological Schools.

== List of institutions awarding Master of Religious Education degrees ==
This is a partial list of institutions of note who award a Master of Religious Education (MRE) degree.

=== North America ===
==== Canada ====
- Newman Theological College
- University of Ottawa
- University of Toronto (through Emmanuel College, Knox College and St. Augustine's Seminary)

==== United States ====
- Lincoln Christian University
- Loyola University New Orleans
- Oklahoma City University
- Unification Theological Seminary
- Liberty University
- Rochester University

=== Australia ===
- BBI – The Australian Institute of Theological Education

=== Philippines ===
- The University of the Immaculate Conception, Davao City
