= Robert Joseph Bedard =

21st-century Canadian Catholic priest

Orders
- Ordination: 6 June 1955

Personal details
- Born: 17 July 1929 Ottawa, Ontario, Canada
- Died: 6 October 2011 (aged 82)
- Denomination: Roman Catholic
- Parents: Henry and Eileen Bedard
- Education: St. Augustine's Seminary

Robert "Bob" Joseph Bedard, CC (17 July 1929 – 6 October 2011), was a Canadian Roman Catholic priest and the founder of the Companions of the Cross.

== Biography ==
Bedard was born in Ottawa to Henry and Eileen Bedard. He attended Corpus Christi School and graduated from St. Patrick's College High School in 1948.

In 1951, he entered St. Augustine's Seminary in Toronto and was ordained a priest on 6 June 1955 at his home parish, Blessed Sacrament. The class of 1955 was the largest ordination class in the seminary's history.

His first assignment was as a curate at Assumption Parish in Eastview (now Vanier), where he was active in youth ministry. He formed a small group of boys aged 12 to 16 to encourage vocations to the priesthood.

He served at Assumption Parish from July 1955 to September 1958, where he was affectionately known as “Father Bob.”

In 1958, he began teaching at St. Pius X Preparatory Seminary, becoming its principal in 1961. During his tenure, the St. Pius X High School shooting occurred, Canada's second recorded school shooting. Bedard encountered the aftermath, including the suicide of the perpetrator, Robert Poulin. The incident had a profound impact on him, reportedly causing a temporary breakdown and lifelong PTSD.

He continued teaching at St. Pius X High School for 20 years.

From 1975 to 1978, Bedard served as the Archdiocese of Ottawa's official liaison to the Charismatic Renewal, appointed by Archbishop Plourde. From 1977 to 1981, he lived in a community household as chaplain to the New Jerusalem Community. He later founded the Ottawa Renewal Centre and launched the Lamplighter newsletter (1982–84).

He also made hundreds of television appearances, most notably on Food for Life.

== Companions of the Cross ==
In May 1985, Bedard founded the Companions of the Cross, a community of priests and seminarians. In May 1990, he began serving full-time as the community's leader. The group was recognized as a Society of Apostolic Life by Archbishop Marcel Gervais in May 2003.

As of 2026, the Companions of the Cross included nearly 50 priests and had produced two bishops, Christian Riesbeck and Scott McCaig.

He advocated for a model of companionship in which priests lived together in community while serving multiple parishes. Ottawa Archbishop Terrence Prendergast, S.J., who invited the Companions to Halifax, said Bedard's “main thing was to support seminarians in their formation and support priests in their priesthood by community life.”

== Death ==
Bedard experienced serious illness for more than two years prior to his death on 6 October 2011.

== Personal life ==
Bedard enjoyed hockey and was an avid supporter of the Ottawa Senators.

He also served as pastor of St. Mary's Parish in Ottawa.

== Recognition ==
On 28 September 1997, he received the Pro Ecclesia et Pontifice medal from Archbishop Gervais on behalf of Pope John Paul II.

His memoir, 'Give God Permission: The Memoirs of Fr. Bob Bedard', was published by the Companions of the Cross.

A documentary on his life, 'Permission', was released on 4 June 2025.

== Publications ==
=== Books ===
- 'Give God Permission' (6 June 2010), ISBN 0986645702
- 'The Catholic Disciple' (13 May 2019), ISBN 0986645710
- 'Evangelization: A Challenge for the Catholic Church' (23 June 2020), ISBN 1686826419

== See also ==
- Marie-Marguerite d'Youville, French-Canadian founder of The Sisters of Charity of Montreal
- Marie Rose Durocher, French-Canadian founder of the Sisters of the Holy Names of Jesus and Mary
