= Ottawa shooting =

Ottawa shooting may refer to:

- St. Pius X High School shooting, which occurred in Ottawa
- 2014 shootings at Parliament Hill
