= Robert Bédard =

Robert Bédard may refer to:

- Robert Joseph Bedard (1929–2011), Canadian Roman Catholic priest
- Robert Bédard (tennis) (born 1931), Canadian tennis player
- Robert Bédard (wrestler) (1932–2019), Canadian wrestler
