= Toronto School of Theology =

Consortium of seminaries affiliated with the University of Toronto

- Coat of arms of the school
- Motto: Óynepãoynteó (Greek)
- Motto in English: "We work together with Him" (2 Corinthians 6.1)
- Type: Ecumenical consortium of theological colleges
- Established: 1964; 62 years ago
- Academic affiliations: University of Toronto
- Director: Darren Dias
- Location: Toronto, Ontario, Canada
- Purpose: Higher theological education, graduate and entry-level degrees
- Website: www.tst.edu

The Toronto School of Theology (TST) is an ecumenical consortium of seven theological colleges affiliated with the University of Toronto. Its seven member schools are Emmanuel College, Knox College, Regis College, St. Augustine's Seminary, the University of St. Michael's College, Trinity College Faculty of Divinity, and Wycliffe College. Since 2022, Regis College and the University of St. Micheal's College have operated academically as the federated Regis St. Michael's Faculty of Theology.

The Toronto School of Theology is the largest ecumenical consortium for theological education in Canada. The TST consortium offers professional and academic degrees, for different educational purposes. Some are primarily professional in character, while others are oriented to general theological studies or research. All degree programs operate at the post-baccalaureate level, and degrees are conferred conjointly by the University of Toronto.

== History ==
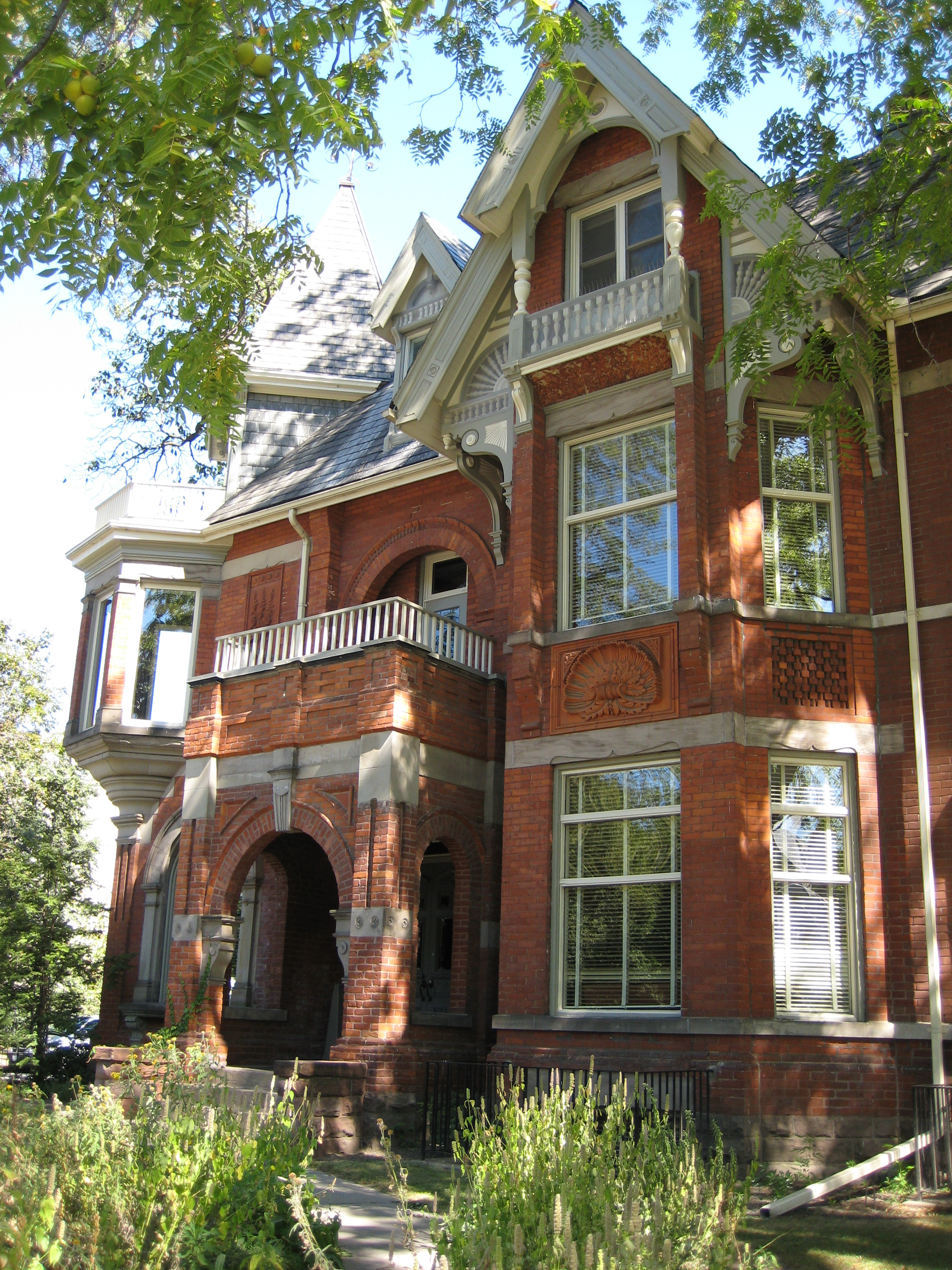
The administrative offices of the Toronto School of Theology

In 1944, the Toronto Graduate School of Theological Studies (TGSTS) was formed to promote collaboration in the Doctor of Theology and Master of Theology programs at Emmanuel, Knox, Trinity, and Wycliffe Colleges. In 1964, the TGSTS was incorporated and this year is considered the official year when the current Toronto School of Theology was established. In 1966, the Graduate Theological Division of St. Michael's College joined TGSTS.

During 1969-70, the success of this venture led to the foundation of the current Toronto School of Theology (TST). Regis College and St. Augustine's Seminary entered into the consortium as member schools, and collaboration began in two professional programs, the MDiv and the MRE, supplementing the cooperation that already existed in the ThD and ThM programs. TST was incorporated in April 1970, by an amendment to the Letters Patent of the TGSTS.

In 1978, TST and its member schools entered into a Memorandum of Agreement with the University of Toronto, making possible the conjoint granting of degrees in theology by the University and the member schools of TST. TST committed itself to the University's academic standards, and began appointing the University's representatives to its Board of Trustees, its academic councils, and its faculty appointments committees. Finally, in 1979 a Memorandum of Agreement with the University of Toronto made it possible for the member schools to grant conjoint basic and advanced degrees in theology.

The Toronto School of Theology's Arms and Flag were registered with the Canadian Heraldic Authority on March 1, 2001. The school's motto is the Greek word συνεργουντες (synergountes), which is taken from 2 Corinthians 6:1 and means "We work together with Him" (or more loosely translates to "Co-worker").

== Member institutions ==
The Toronto School of Theology consists of seven member theological schools and is the largest ecumenical consortium for theological education in Canada.

=== Full members ===
Name	Founded	Denomination
Emmanuel College	1928	United Church of Canada
St. Augustine's Seminary	1913	Roman Catholic, Diocesan
Wycliffe College	1877	Anglican, Evangelical
Regis College (through the Regis St. Michael's Faculty of Theology)	1930	Roman Catholic, Jesuit
Knox College	1844	Presbyterian Church in Canada
University of St. Michael's College (through the Regis St. Michael's Faculty of Theology)	1852	Roman Catholic, Basilian
Trinity College, Faculty of Divinity	1851	Anglican Church of Canada

=== Affiliated institutions ===
Name	Founded	Denomination	Parent Institution
Conrad Grebel University College	1963	Mennonite	University of Waterloo
Institute for Christian Studies	1967	Christian Reformed	—N/a
NAIITS An Indigenous Learning Community	1999	Evangelical	—N/a

== Academics ==
=== Programs ===
The seven member colleges of the Toronto School of Theology offer basic degrees, master's degrees, and doctoral degrees in theology.

The majority of TST's degrees are awarded conjointly by a TST member college and the University of Toronto, while a few degrees, certificates and diplomas are solely awarded by a TST member college.

==== Basic degrees ====
The following degrees are offered conjointly by Toronto School of Theology member colleges and the University of Toronto. The degrees are listed below according to the categories of the Association for Theological Schools.

- Master of Divinity
- Master of Religious Education
- Master of Theological Studies
  - Theology, Spirituality and the Arts
  - Urban Community Development
- Master of Psychospiritual Studies
  - Spiritual Care stream and Certificate in Spiritual Care and Psychotherapy
  - Spiritual Care focus
- Master of Arts in Ministry and Spirituality
- Master of Sacred Music

The following certificates are offered conjointly by TST member colleges and the University of Toronto. Not all TST member colleges offer all certificates.

- Certificate in Theological Studies (CTS)
- Certificate in Theology and Interreligious Engagement (CTIE)

==== Graduate degrees ====
The Toronto School of Theology has the largest graduate program in theology in Canada. TST offers two advanced master's degrees, the Master of Theology (ThM) and the Master of Arts in Theology (MA). Both degrees are granted conjointly by the University of Toronto and the TST member school in which the student is registered. TST's doctoral program leads towards the Doctor of Philosophy in Theological Studies (PhD), granted conjointly by the University of Toronto and the TST member school in which the student is registered. The Doctor of Ministry (DMin) program is a professional doctoral degree granted conjointly by the University of Toronto and the TST member school in which the student is registered.

The following graduate degrees are awarded conjointly by a TST member college and the University of Toronto:

- Doctor of Philosophy (PhD) in Theological Studies
- Master of Arts (MA) in Theological Studies
- Master of Theology (ThM)
- Doctor of Ministry (DMin)

=== Reputation and rankings ===
In the 2021 QS World University Rankings, the Toronto School of Theology/University of Toronto was ranked first in Canada and 11th in the world for Theology, Divinity & Religious Studies. The journal First Things, an organ of the Institute on Religion and Public Life in New York, ranked the Toronto School of Theology fourth among graduate programs in theology. The Toronto School of Theology was also ranked third for the number of doctoral students that have graduated and gone on to positions in member schools of the Association of Theological Schools.

== Toronto School of Theology libraries ==
Students have access to the libraries of every member school, including Knox's Caven Library, St. Michael's Kelly Library, Trinity and Wycliffe's John W. Graham Library, and the libraries of Emmanuel College, Regis College, and St. Augustine's Seminary. Students, moreover, have access to the University of Toronto Libraries system, including Robarts Library, Canada's largest library and the fourth largest academic library system in North America.

== Journals ==
The Toronto Journal of Theology is published semi-annually. It promotes progressive publication of current opinion on the full range of scholarship represented by diverse Christian traditions through the analysis of issues in Biblical Studies, History of Christianity, Systematic and Pastoral Theology, and Christian Ethics and engagement of cross-cultural perspectives in discussing theological issues.

== See also ==
- Higher education in Ontario
