= Robert Dobbie =

The Reverend Robert Dobbie, UCC Doctor of Divinity by Honoris Causa (Victoria University in the University of Toronto)
- Born: 3 December 1901; Dundee, Scotland (United Kingdom)
- Died: 2000, Canada
- Education: B.A. (Glasgow) (1924); B.D. (Glasgow) (1927); B.D. External (London) (1934); M.Th. (London) (1940)
- Occupations: Pastor, University Teacher
- Years active: 1927-1974 (47 years)
- Known for: Old Testament Exegesis

Ecclesiastical career
- Religion: Christianity
- Church: United Church of Canada (Congregational)
- Congregations: Dunfermline, Scotland (UK) (1927-1936); Cambuslang, Scotland (UK) (1936-1941); Ardrossan, Scotland (UK) (1941-1946)
- Offices held: Lecturer, Glasgow University, Glasgow, Scotland (United Kingdom) (1946-1947); Lecturer, St. Andrew's University, St. Andrews, Scotland (United Kingdom) (1947-1955); Professor, Emmanuel College, Toronto (Canada) (1955-1969); Professor, Carleton University, Ottawa, (Canada) (1969-1974)
- Title: The Reverend Doctor

Robert Dobbie (1901–2000) was a Pastor hailing from Dundee, Scotland who taught Old Testament at the Universities of Glasgow (1946–1947), St. Andrews (1947–1955), Toronto (1955–1969) and at Carleton (1969–1974).

Robert Dobbie was active in contributing to Old Testament scholarship. Wolfgang Roth was a student at Dobbie in Toronto. Dobbie also used to compose hymns.

Dobbie was a member of the Society of Biblical Literature and was at one time elected as Vice-President of the Canadian section of the Society of Biblical Literature. Dobbie used to contribute to Old Testament scholarship through his writings which appeared in biblical journals like The Expository Times, Vetus Testamentum, Canadian Journal of Theology, Scottish Journal of Theology, International Review of Missions.

Dobbie last taught at Carleton University where he was Visiting Professor of Religion from 1969 onwards.

== Hymns ==
- Eternal Father, Lord of space and time
- Eternal God, we consecrate these children

== Writings ==
- 1955, The Text of Hosea Ix 8
- 1958, Sacrifice and Morality in the Old Testament
- 1958, Jeremiah and the preacher
- 1958, A Meditation on Jonah
- 1959, Deuteronomy and the prophetic attitude to sacrifice
- 1962, The Biblical Foundation of the Mission of the Church. I: The Old Testament

== Achievements ==
The Senate of the Victoria University in the University of Toronto conferred an honorary degree of Doctor of Divinity by Honoris Causa upon Dobbie in 1979.
