= Christ the King Basilica =

Church in Ontario, Canada

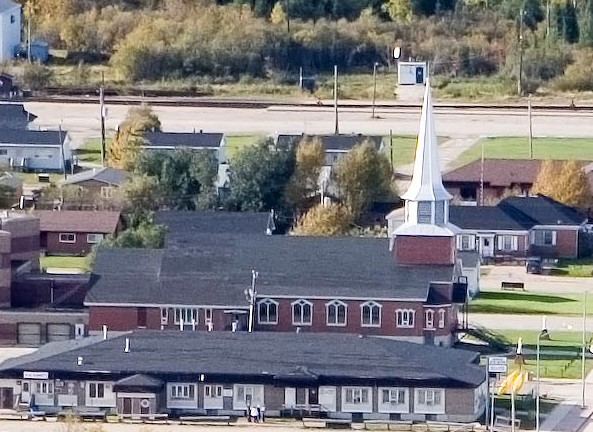
- Christ the King Basilica
- 51.273313°N 80.645063°W
- Location: 2 Bay Rd, Moosonee, Ontario; K0C 1A0
- Country: Canada
- Denomination: Roman Catholic
- Website: Parish website

History
- Former name(s): Christ the King Church; Christ the King Cathedral
- Status: minor basilica
- Dedication: Christ The King

Administration
- Archdiocese: Diocese of Hearst–Moosonee

Christ the King Basilica is a Roman Catholic minor basilica dedicated to the Christ the King located in Moosonee, Ontario, Canada. The basilica served as the cathedral of the Diocese of Moosonee from 1936 to its suppression in 2018.

On June 22, 2020, the church was designated as a minor basilica.
