= Wolfgang Roth =

Wolfgang Roth is the name of:

- Wolfgang Roth (politician), German politician
- Wolfgang Roth (scholar), German scholar and pastor
