= Military Ordinariate of Canada =

Catholic ecclesiastical jurisdiction in Canada

Military Ordinariate of Canada Ordinariatus Militaris Canadensis Ordinariat militaire du Canada
- The Coat of Arms of the Military Ordinariate of Canada

Location
- Country: Canada
- Ecclesiastical province: Immediately exempt to the Holy See

Information
- Denomination: Catholic Church
- Sui iuris church: Latin Church
- Rite: Multiple (primarily the Roman Rite)
- Established: 17 February 1951; 75 years ago

Current leadership
- Pope: Leo XIV
- Bishop: Scott McCaig, C.C.

The Military Ordinariate of Canada (French: Ordinariat militaire du Canada, Latin: Ordinariatus Militaris Canadensis) is a Latin Church military ordinariate of the Catholic Church.

It is immediately exempt to the Holy See and its Roman Congregation for Bishops. With no cathedral, the ordinariate's headquarters are at Canadian Forces Support Unit (Ottawa), Uplands site - Building 469, Ottawa, Ontario K1A 0K2. The current episcopal Ordinary is Scott McCaig. The Roman Catholic Military Ordinary is a member of the ecumenical Interfaith Committee on Canadian Military Chaplaincy (ICCMC).

== Statistics ==
Catholic chaplains provide a wide range of religious and spiritual services to Canadian Armed Forces members and their families, such as the celebration of the Sacraments, counselling and religious formation. As per 2014, it provides pastoral care to Roman Catholics serving in the Canadian Forces and their families in 22 parishes with 37 priests (36 diocesan, 1 religious), 7 deacons and 1 lay religious brother.

== History ==
The military vicariate of Canada was canonically erected on 17 February 1951 by Pope Pius XII, but Catholic Military bishops have served the Canadian Army since 1939.

The need to appoint a bishop was only felt during the Second World War, while chaplains had already been represented since the Boer War.

On 1986.07.21 it was promoted as Military Ordinariate of Canada. Since the promulgation of the apostolic constitution Spirituali militum curae by Pope John Paul II, the administration of chaplaincies was made much easier.

=== Sex abuse controversies ===
On 7 September 2020, Canadian Armed Forces spokesman Maj. Travis Smyth acknowledged that Capt. Jean El-Dahdouh, a Montreal-based Maronite Order military chaplain found guilty the previous year of assault and sexual assault after a series of incidents at the upscale Nordik Spa-Nature in Chelsea, Quebec, was still a member of the Canadian military, but he was now expected to soon be released from the armed forces. On 16 November 2020, documents which the Canadian Forces sought keep sealing for 40 years were public. The documents revealed that Canadian Forces knew that Catholic Chaplain Capt. Angus McRae had victims before his 1980 sex abuse conviction for children to his quarters at an Edmonton military base and gave them alcohol before sexually assaulting them.

== Episcopal office holders ==
It twice had an Auxiliary Bishop of the Military Vicariate :

- Norman Joseph Gallagher (1963.06.25 – 1966)
- Francis John Spence (1967.04.01 – 1970.08.17 see below), Titular Bishop of Nova (1967.04.01 – 1970.08.17), next Bishop of Charlottetown (Canada) (1970.08.17 – 1982.03.14)

=== Military Bishops ===
- Charles Leo Nelligan (appointed 20 September 1939 – resigned 19 May 1945), while Bishop of Pembroke (Canada) (1937.08.16 – 1945.05.19); emeritate as Titular Bishop of Phœnice (1945.05.19 – 1970.11.16), died 1974
- Maurice Roy (appointed 8 June 1946 – see below became first Military Vicar 17 February 1951), while first Bishop of Trois-Rivières (Canada) (1946.02.22 – 1947.06.02), then Metropolitan Archbishop of Québec (Canada) (1947.06.02 – retired 1981.03.20)

=== Military Vicars ===
- Maurice Roy (see above appointed 17 February 1951 – retired 12 March 1982), created Cardinal-Priest of Nostra Signora del SS. Sacramento e Santi Martiri Canadesi (1965.02.25 – death 1985.10.24), President of the Pontifical Council for the Laity (1967.01.06 – 1976.12.16), President of the Pontifical Commission of Justice and Peace (1967.01.06 – 1976.12.16), President of the Committee for the Family (1973.01.11 – 1976.12.16)
- Francis John Spence (see above appointed 21 July 1986 – see below became first Military Ordinary 21 July 1986)

=== Military Ordinaries ===
- Francis John Spence (see above appointed 21 July 1986 – resigned 28 October 1987), while Metropolitan Archbishop of Kingston (Canada) (1982.04.24 – 2002.04.27), later President of Canadian Conference of Catholic Bishops (1995–1997)
- André Vallée, Society of Foreign Missions (P.M.E.) (appointed 28 October 1987 – 19 August 1996), Titular Bishop of Sufasar (1987.10.28 – 1996.08.19), later translated to the Diocese of Hearst (1996.08.19 – retired 2005.11.03), died 2015; previously Superior General of Society of Foreign Missions (1973.07.05 – 1979.06.05)
- Donald Thériault (appointed 25 March 1998 – retired 2016.04.08), no other office
- Scott McCaig, Companions of the Cross (C.C.) (appointed May 31, 2016 – ...), previously General Superior of Companions of the Cross (2006 – 2016.04.08)

== See also ==
- List of Catholic dioceses in Canada
- Roman Catholic Archdiocese for the Military Services, USA § Patron saints
- Royal Canadian Chaplain Service

== Sources and external links ==
- GCatholic.org, with Google map and satellite photo
- Roman Catholic Military Ordinariate of Canada (Official Website)
- Diocèse militaire du Canada. Missa.org (in French)
- Military Chaplaincy
- Military Ordinariate of Canada (Catholic-Hierarchy)
