= Scott McCaig =

Canadian Catholic bishop

His Excellency, The Most Reverend Scott McCaig CC
- Bishop of the Military Ordinariate of Canada
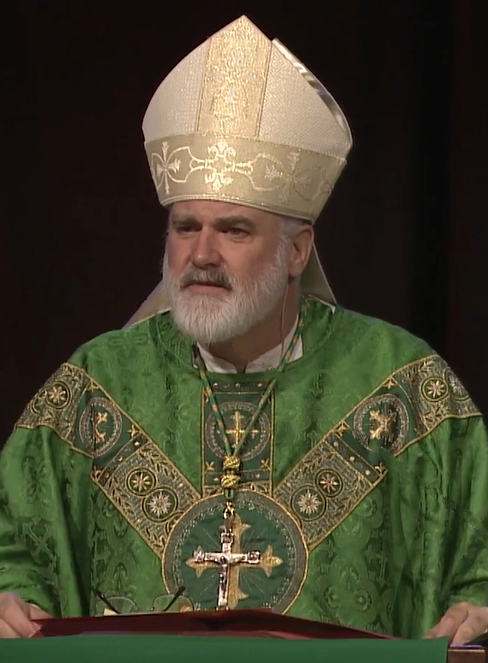
- Bishop McCaig in 2022
- Diocese: Military Ordinariate of Canada
- Installed: May 31, 2016
- Predecessor: Donald J. Thériault
- Previous post: General Superior of the Companions of the Cross 2006-2016

Orders
- Ordination: June 3, 1995 by Archbishop Marcel André J. Gervais
- Consecration: May 31, 2016 by Archbishop Terrence Prendergast

Personal details
- Born: Scott Cal McCaig; December 12, 1965 (age 60) Duncan, British Columbia, Canada
- Denomination: Roman Catholic
- Education: Carleton University; Saint Paul University; University of Toronto
- Motto: Juxta Crucem Cum Maria; (By the cross with Mary)
- Coat of arms: Scott McCaig's coat of arms

Styles of Scott McCaig
- Reference style: His Excellency; The Most Reverend
- Spoken style: His Excellency; Your Excellency
- Religious style: Bishop

Ordination history of Scott McCaig
History
Priestly ordination
- Ordained by: Archbishop Marcel André J. Gervais
Episcopal consecration
- Principal consecrator: Archbishop Terrence Prendergast
- Co-consecrators: Bishop Donald Joseph Thériault; Bishop Christian Heribert Riesbeck
- Source(s):"{{{1}}}/{{{2}}}". Catholic-Hierarchy.org. David M. Cheney.

Scott Cal McCaig (born December 12, 1965) is a Canadian bishop of the Roman Catholic Church. He is currently bishop of the Military Ordinariate of Canada. Pope Francis appointed McCaig to this post on April 8, 2016. He served as General Superior of the Companions of the Cross from 2006 to 2016.

== Early life ==
McCaig was born December 12, 1965, in Duncan, British Columbia, on Vancouver Island. His parents grew up in Northwestern Ontario. He grew up in Kamloops, British Columbia.

== Conversion ==
McCaig was baptised Presbyterian and grew up as a cultural Christian of the Presbyterian and Anglican denominations. His first experience in any church was a Catholic wedding. After high-school, McCaig spent a year skiing and hiking in Lake Louise, where he first began questioning his belief in the existence of God.

While attending community college in Kamloops, as a history undergrad, he began dating a devout Catholic woman. She and her family, some of which were clergy, stirred McCaig's existential questions. After she left for Europe, McCaig dropped several of his college courses to study the existence of God and the divinity of Jesus. C.S. Lewis' apologetic argument for the divinity of Jesus known as Lewis' trilemma shifted McCaig's interest. His study of the revelations of Fatima and Lourdes, and the lives of Faustina Kowalska, Padre Pio and Pope John Paul II affirmed his belief in the divinity of Jesus and the existence of God.

McCaig then began to seek where to find Jesus out of the thousands of Christian denominations. McCaig engaged with members of various Christian denominations in attempts to determine the validity of the five solae. These discussions led him to discover the theme of various denominations claiming to be faithful to the doctrine of the early Church Fathers' beliefs and practices, bringing him to study the early Church fathers. While studying McCaig began taking RCIA. While taking RCIA, before his conversion, McCaig began co-leading the Sacred Heart Cathedral young adults group, with a recent convert. McCaig studied Ignatius of Antioch, Pope Clement of Rome, Polycarp and Irenaeus, and saw the existence of apostolic succession, Petrine ministry, real presence of Christ in the Eucharist, intercession of saints, prayer for the dead, church hierarchy in bishops, deacons, priests, and three levels of holy orders. McCaig's study of the early Church fathers convinced him to enter into full communion with the Catholic Church receiving the sacraments of confirmation and first communion at Easter Vigil, on April 18, 1987.

== Education ==
McCaig has a BA in History from Carleton University, a bachelor’s degree in sacred theology from the Pontifical University of St. Paul University in Ottawa, and a Master's degree in Divinity from St. Augustine’s Seminary and the University of Toronto.

== NET Ministries ==
In the spring of 1987, two weeks after entering into full communion with the Catholic Church, McCaig took the Sacred Heart Cathedral youth group to a NET retreat. In autumn 1987, McCaig got accepted to serve with NET Youth Ministries for one year from 1987 to 1988.

While serving on NET, McCaig met Bob Bedard, the founder of the Companions of the Cross, at a charismatic conference in Notre Dame. Bedard took McCaig, three of the other NET missionaries, and some seminarians out for food. McCaig and two of the other NET missionaries later joined the Companions of the Cross.

McCaig is the second NET alumnus to be appointed bishop, after Bishop Andrew H. Cozzens. He continues to assist in the training of missionaries with NET Ministries of Canada.

== Companions of the Cross ==
While discerning his vocation in St. Andrew's Cathedral in Victoria, British Columbia, McCaig recalls asking God, "If you really, really want me to be a priest, then I need you to speak to me in a way I will really understand." He then went to the back of the church and opened a copy of The B.C. Catholic newspaper and saw Sean O'Sullivan's "Dare to be a priest like me" advertisement, that he saw ten years prior on a road sign in Ontario. Within a few months he visited Bedard and moved to Ottawa.

In 1989, McCaig joined the Society of Apostolic Life the Companions of the Cross in Ottawa. He was ordained to the priesthood in 1995. From 2000 to 2006, he served as an associate pastor, parish administrator, hospital chaplain, and Director of Formation for the Companions.

In 2006, McCaig was elected General Superior of the Companions of the Cross. He was re-elected in 2012 and served until his appointment to the Military Ordinariate of Canada in 2016.

== Military Ordinariate of Canada ==
On April 8, 2016, McCaig was appointed to the Military Ordinariate of Canada by Pope Francis. Following his appointment he stated "It’s a crucial necessity to support the troops and support those protecting our freedoms and upholding human dignity."

On May 31, 2016, on the Feast of the Visitation, McCaig was consecrated as a bishop at Notre Dame Cathedral and installed as the bishop of the Military Ordinariate of Canada.

In May 2017, McCaig led a military delegation of over 60 people on a pilgrimage to Lourdes, France. Maj-Gen. Chapdelaine stated this pilgrimage was part of a program for the spiritual resilience of Canadian Armed Forces members who seek to deepen their faith.

== Other work ==
McCaig serves on the Board of Renewal Ministries Canada and has participated in missionary outreach to over fifteen countries in Africa, Eastern Europe, and Southeast Asia.

Since 2013, McCaig has served on the board of Catholic Christian Outreach. He is involved in the spiritual formation of the members of the movement.

He is the co-chaplain to the Spiritual Motherhood of Priests Apostolate in Ottawa.
