= Bishop of Moosonee =

Bishop of Moosonee can refer to:

- Roman Catholic Bishop of Moosonee
- Anglican Bishop of Moosonee
