= Foreign Missions Society =

Foreign Missions Society or Société des Missions-Étrangères may refer to:

Catholic

- Société des Missions Étrangères de Paris (Paris Foreign Missions Society) (MEP), founded in Paris, France in 1660
- Pontifical Institute for Foreign Missions (PIME), independently founded in Milan in 1850 and Rome in 1874, and merged in 1926.
- Saint Joseph's Missionary Society of Mill Hill (MHM), founded in London in 1866.
- Catholic Foreign Mission Society of America (MM), founded in Hawthorne, New York in 1912
- Société des Missions-Étrangères du Québec (Quebec Foreign Missions Society) (PME), founded in Quebec, Canada in 1921
- Saint Patrick's Society for the Foreign Missions (SPS), founded in 1932, headquartered in Ireland

Protestant

- American Baptist Foreign Mission Society, founded in 1814, headquartered in King of Prussia, Pennsylvania, now International Ministries
