= At the Crossroads (1943 film) =

1943 film by Paul Guèvremont

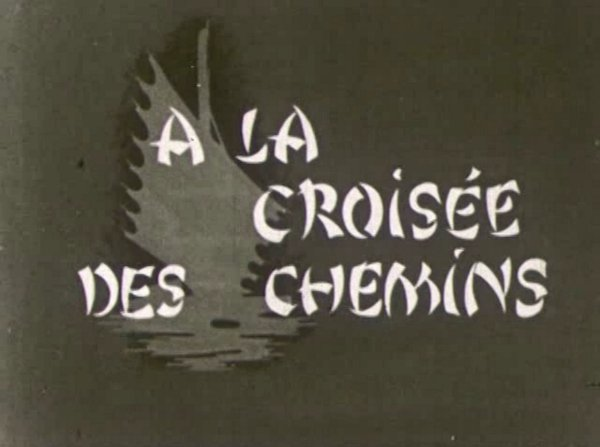
- Title credits
- French: À la croisée des chemins
- Directed by: Paul Guèvremont
- Written by: Jean-Marie Poitevin
- Starring: Paul Guèvremont; Denise Pelletier; Rose Rey-Duzil; Jean Fontaine; Camélienne Séguin; Denis Drouin; Lorenzo Barriteau
- Cinematography: Paul Morin
- Edited by: Jean-Marie Poitevin
- Music by: Fernand Gaudry
- Distributed by: Société des Missions-Étrangères du Québec
- Release date: 1943 (Canada)
- Running time: 97 minutes
- Country: Canada
- Language: French

At the Crossroads (French: À la croisée des chemins) is a 1943 Canadian film directed by Jean-Marie Poitevin and written by Paul Guèvremont. The first dramatic feature to be produced by a Quebec religious community, the Société des Missions-Étrangères du Québec, it was narrated by René Lévesque, the future premier of Quebec.

== Plot ==
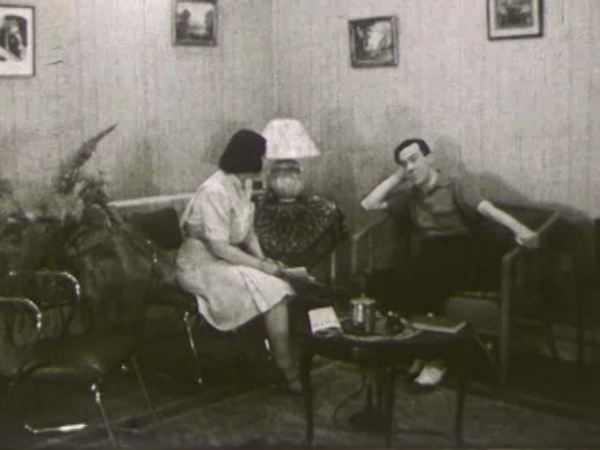
An image from the film, in which Jean tells his mother he intends to become a missionary

A young man, Jean Liber (Paul Guèvremont), who, at the end of his cours classique, decides to leave his rich, happy family and his fiancée, Pauline (Denise Pelletier), in order to become a missionary in China. This story of his struggle, 'at the crossroads' between love and God's calling, is clearly a pretext for a film designed to encourage young men to enter missionary work.

== Production ==
At the Crossroads was the first fictional feature-length film made in sound in Quebec. It was an adaptation of Guy Stein's La folle aventure.

== Importance ==
À la croisée des chemins was based on a religious drama by Guy Stein, La folle aventure, which had been staged in 1942 for the 300th anniversary of the founding of Montreal. Canadian film historian Peter Morris wrote: "It [the film] offers a remarkable ideological portrait of Quebec before the Quiet Revolution. Clearly apparent are the values of a lifestyle fostered by a militant Catholic Church: friendship, warmth, and an unproblematic family life. Equally apparent (at least in retrospect) are destructive self-sacrifice, repressed sexuality, and mutually sustaining links between religious and economic establishments."

== Works cited ==
- Loiselle, André (2003). Stage-Bound: Feature Film Adaptations of Canadian and Québécois Drama. McGill–Queen's University Press. ISBN 9780773571464.
