= Ewart College =

Former women's college in Toronto

Coordinates: 43.6665°N 79.4000°W

- Type: Public women's college
- Active: October 11, 1897–1991 (merged with Knox College, Toronto)
- Affiliations: Presbyterian Church in Canada
- Location: Toronto, Ontario, Canada

Ewart College was a historical women's college located in Toronto, Ontario, Canada, affiliated with the Presbyterian Church in Canada. In September 1991, it merged with Knox College of the University of Toronto.

Founded on October 11, 1897, it was then called the Ewart Missionary Training Home, later to be renamed the Presbyterian Missionary and Deaconess Training School. After a new building was constructed in 1960, it was renamed for Catherine Seaton Ewart; that building, located at 156 St. George Street, is now home to Ernescliff College, an Opus Dei residence.

Founded by women, the original purpose of Ewart was to prepare women for missionary service. In later years, it focused on diaconal ministry and Christian and lay education. Following the Presbyterian Church in Canada's decision to ordain women as Ministers in 1966, the college admitted male students in the 1970s, and in 1991, along with the merger with Knox College, many Ewart graduates have taken further studies to become ordained within the Presbyterian Church.

Ewart Chapel, housed within the Chapel at Knox College, is named after Ewart College, along with the McKay Educational Resource Room. The Ewart Centre for Lay Education at Knox College, an adult education program, is also named after the institution. It offers a certificate program in Christian Faith and Life.

== See also ==
- List of current and historical women's universities and colleges
