= Charles Leo Nelligan =

Canadian bishop

Coat of arms of Charles Leo Nelligan

Charles Leo Nelligan was a Canadian bishop. As bishop of the Military Ordinariate of Canada, he praised the Knights of Columbus for their support of Canadian troops during World War II.

He was Bishop of Pembroke from 1937 to 1945.

His resting place, is located at Heavenly Rest Cemetery in Windsor, Ontario, Canada.
