= André Vallée =

André Vallée P.M.E.
- Bishop of Hearst
- Church: Catholic Church
- Diocese: Diocese of Hearst
- In office: 19 August 1996 – 3 November 2005
- Predecessor: Pierre Fisette
- Successor: Vincent Cadieux
- Previous posts: Titular Bishop of Sufasar (1987-1996); Bishop of the Military Ordinariate of Canada (1987-1996); Superior General of the Société des Missions-Étrangères du Québec (1973-1979)

Orders
- Ordination: 24 June 1956
- Consecration: 28 January 1988 by James Martin Hayes

Personal details
- Born: July 31, 1930 Sainte-Anne-de-la-Pérade, Quebec, Dominion of Canada
- Died: February 28, 2015 (aged 84)

André Vallée P.M.E. (July 31, 1930 – February 28, 2015) was a Canadian Roman Catholic prelate.

Ordained to the priesthood in 1956, Vallée was named bishop of the Military Ordinariate of Canada in 1987 and served until 1996. In 1995, he was appointed bishop of the Roman Catholic Diocese of Hearst and retired in 2005.

== Notes ==
Catholic Church titles
Preceded by Pierre Fisette	Bishop of the Roman Catholic Diocese of Hearst; 1995–2005	Succeeded by Vincent Cadieux
Preceded by Francis John Spence	Military Ordinariate of Canada; 1987–1996	Succeeded by Donald Thériault
