= Francis John Spence =

- Archbishop of Kingston
- Church: Catholic Church
- Archdiocese: Archdiocese of Kingston
- In office: April 24, 1982 – April 27, 2002
- Predecessor: Joseph Lawrence Wilhelm
- Successor: Anthony Giroux Meagher
- Previous posts: Military Ordinary of Canada (1982-1987); Bishop of Charlottetown (1970-1982); Titular Bishop of Nova (1967-1970); Auxiliary Bishop of the Military Ordinary of Canada (1967-1970)

Orders
- Ordination: April 16, 1950
- Consecration: June 15, 1967 by Maurice Roy

Personal details
- Born: June 3, 1926 Perth, Ontario, Dominion of Canada, British Empire
- Died: July 27, 2011 (aged 85)

Francis John Spence (June 3, 1926 – July 27, 2011) was a Canadian Roman Catholic prelate. Spence served as the Archbishop of the Roman Catholic Archdiocese of Kingston from 1982 until his retirement in 2002.

Spence also served as vicar and ordinary for the Canadian Forces under the Military Ordinariate of Canada from 1986 to 1987.

Spence was born in Perth, Ontario, in 1926. He was ordained a Catholic priest on April 16, 1950. Archbishop Spence died on July 27, 2011, at the age of 85.

Catholic Church titles
Preceded by Joseph Lawrence Wilhelm	Archbishop of the Roman Catholic Archdiocese of Kingston; 1982–2002	Succeeded by Anthony G. Meager
Preceded by Maurice Roy	Bishop Vicar of Military Ordinariate of Canada; 21 July 1986	Succeeded by post abolished and replaced by himself as Military Ordinariate
Preceded by new post	Bishop Military Ordinariate of Canada; 1986–1987	Succeeded by André Vallée
