= Christian Riesbeck =

Canadian Catholic bishop

His Excellency, the Most Reverend Christian Riesbeck CC
- Bishop of Saint John
- Diocese: Diocese of Saint John

Orders
- Ordination: October 12, 1996
- Consecration: March 19, 2014 by Terrence Prendergast

Personal details
- Born: February 7, 1970 (age 56)
- Denomination: Catholic Church
- Education: University of Ottawa (B. Soc. Sc.); Saint Paul University (J.C.L.)
- Motto: "Evangelii Gaudium"
- Coat of arms

Styles of Christian Riesbeck
- Reference style: His Excellency, The Most Reverend
- Spoken style: The Most Reverend

Christian Riesbeck CC (born February 7, 1970) is a Canadian Catholic prelate who currently serves as Bishop of Saint John, New Brunswick. He is a member of the Companions of the Cross.

== Early life and education ==
Riesbeck was born in Montreal, Quebec, the child of a German father and New Brunswick-francophone mother. He received a Bachelor of Social Sciences in Political Science at the University of Ottawa, a Master of Divinity from St. Augustine's Seminary, and a Licentiate of Canon Law from Saint Paul University in Ottawa. He was ordained a priest for the Diocese of Ottawa on October 12, 1996.

== Priesthood ==
After working for three years as a parochial vicar in Ottawa, Ontario, he was sent to Houston, Texas as a parish priest in 1999. There Riesbeck learned Spanish over seven weeks in order to celebrate mass for the congregation at predominantly Hispanic Queen of Peace parish. He was credited with a "remarkable turnaround" of the parish and its school.

Riesbeck was incardinated as a member of the Companions of the Cross in 2003, and served as its Assistant General Superior. In 2010, Riesbeck was appointed Chancellor of the Diocese of Ottawa and was a judge on the Catholic Church's regional marriage tribunal. Riesbeck speaks French, English, German, and Spanish.

== Episcopal ministry ==
On January 7, 2014, Christian Riesbeck was appointed an auxiliary bishop of the Diocese of Ottawa and titular bishop of Tipasa in Numidia by Pope Francis. On March 19, 2014, he received episcopal ordination by archbishop Terrence Prendergast joined by archbishop-emeritus Marcel Gervais and bishop Paul-Andre Durocher.

Riesbeck criticized Prime Minister Justin Trudeau's position on abortion and suggested it would be unseemly for him to continue receiving communion, saying he takes issue with "the fact that he considers himself to be a devout Catholic but then adheres to, or advocates for, abortion." He suggested that to ameliorate his relationship with the Catholic Church, Trudeau would "have to make a public retraction of his views."

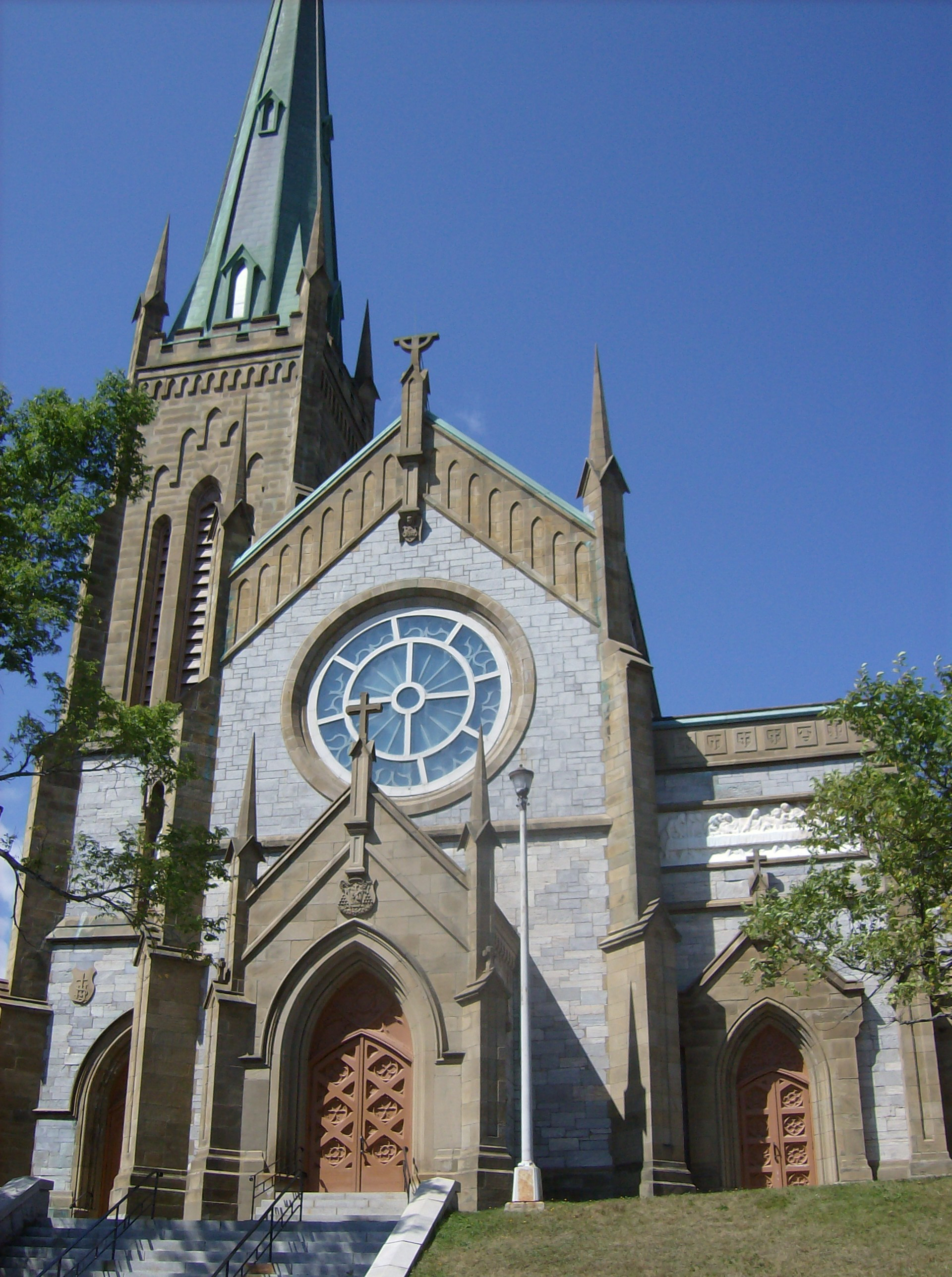
The Cathedral of the Immaculate Conception in Saint John, New Brunswick, where Riesbeck was installed as bishop.

On October 15, 2019, Riesbeck was appointed bishop of the Diocese of Saint John by Pope Francis. Riesbeck chose the episcopal motto "Evangelii Gaudium" — meaning "joy of the gospel" — in reference to Pope Francis's apostolic exhortation of the same name.
