= Wolfgang Roth (scholar) =

German pastor

Wolfgang Roth, UCC
- Born: 1 October 1930; Darmstadt, Hesse, Germany
- Died: 24 November 2013 (aged 83); Evanston, Illinois, United States of America
- Education: Victoria University, Toronto, Universities of Tübingen, Heidelberg, and Marburg
- Parent(s): Kaethe (née Fiebig) and Ludwig Wilhelm Roth
- Church: Methodist Church in India/United Church of Canada
- Congregations served: Canada
- Offices held: Pastor, Canada (−1959); Professor, Leonard Theological College, Jabalpur (1959–1967) Professor, Garrett–Evangelical Theological Seminary, Evanston, Illinois (1967–1996) Professor Emeritus, Garrett–Evangelical Theological Seminary, Evanston, Illinois(1996–2013)
- Title: Reverend Doctor

Wolfgang Max Wilhelm Roth (1 October 1930 – 24 November 2013), also known as W. M. W. Roth, was a German pastor of the United Church of Canada and an Old Testament scholar with major contribution to the growth of Old Testament scholarship for more than half a century from 1959 through 2013. Roth was a scholar in the line of Gerhard von Rad acknowledging the influence of the master-specialist of Old Testament ever since his study days at the University of Heidelberg, Germany. Roth's writings drew the attention of the world of Old Testament scholarship through his writings which began appearing in journals like Catholic Biblical Quarterly, Journal of Biblical Literature, Vetus Testamentum, theological commentaries and other theological treatises.

== Studies ==
=== Germany ===
Initial graduate studies were undertaken by Roth at the Universities of Tübingen, Heidelberg, and Marburg. Roth acknowledges the inspiration of Gerhard von Rad, his Professor at Heidelberg.

=== Canada ===
Roth studied for postgraduate and doctoral degrees at Emmanuel College under the Old Testament Professor Robert Dobbie. During Roth's study days in 1953 at the college in Toronto, he happened to be a companion of A. B. Masilamani, the Indian lyric writer who was studying at the college in 1952. In their later years, both Roth and Masilamani happened to teach at seminaries in India affiliated to the Senate of Serampore College (University). While Roth began teaching from 1959 onwards at the Leonard Theological College, Jabalpur, Masilamani was already on the faculty of a seminary located further south at the Baptist Theological Seminary, Kakinada.

== Professorship ==
=== Leonard Theological College, Jabalpur, India ===
From 1959 to 1967 Roth taught Old Testament at the Leonard Theological College, Jabalpur, which is affiliated with the Senate of Serampore College (University).

=== Garrett–Evangelical Theological Seminary, Evanston, Illinois ===
In 1967, Roth moved to the Garrett–Evangelical Theological Seminary, Evanston, Illinois where he began teaching Old Testament. He was the Frederick Carl Eiselen Professor of Old Testament Interpretation from 1981 until his retirement in 1996. The Seminary continued to keep Roth under its teaching faculty and designated him as Professor Emeritus from 1996 onwards. Roth continued to teach at the Seminary until his death in 2013.

== Writings ==
=== Books authored ===
- 1965, Numerical Sayings in the Old Testament: A Form-Critical Study
- 1968, Old Testament Theology.
- 1988, Hebrew Gospel: Cracking the Code of Mark
- 1988, Isaiah

=== Books co-authored/edited ===
- 1966 (with H. Burkle), Indian Voices in Today's Theological Debate (republished in 1972)
- 1967 (with George Johnston), The Church in the Modern World
- 1974 (with George W. Hoyer), Pentecost 2
- 1978 (with Rosemary Radford Ruether), The Liberating Bond: Covenants-Biblical and Contemporary

=== Articles written ===
- 1960, NBL,
- 1962, The Numerical Sequence x/x+l in the Old Testament
- 1963, Love in the New Testament,
- 1963 (in German), Hinterhalt und Scheinflucht
- 1963, The Historical-Critical Method and Its Function in Biblical Interpretation
- 1964, The Anonymity of the Suffering Servant
- 1964, An Approach to New Testament Christology
- 1968, A Study of the Classical Hebrew Verb SKL
- 1972, The Wooing of Rebekah: a tradition-critical study of Genesis 24
- 1972, Thought Patterns – Fetters or Opportunities?
- 1974, What of Sodom and Gomorrah? Homosexual Acts in the Old Testament
- 1975, For Life, He Appeals to Death (Wis 13:18). A Study of Old Testament Idol Parodies
- 1975, What of Sodom and Gomorrah? Homosexual Acts in the Old Testament
- 1976, The Deuteronomic Rest Theology: A Redaction-Critical Study,
- 1977, You are the Man! Structural Interaction in 2 Samuel 10–12
- 1977, The Language of Peace: Shalom and Eirene
- 1979, The Text is the Medium: An Interpretation of the Jacob Stories in Genesis
- 1980, On the Gnomic-Discursive Wisdom of Jesus Ben Sirach,
- 1981 (in German), Deuteronomistisches Geschichtswerk/Deuteronomistische Schule
- 1982, The Story of the Prophet Micaiah (1 Kings 22) in Historical-Critical Interpretation
- 1983, The Secret of the Kingdom
- 1992, Mark, John and their Old Testament Codes
- 1999, Rhetorical Criticism, Hebrew Bible
