= Roman Catholic Diocese of Moosonee =

Catholic ecclesiastical territory

Diocese of Moosonee

Location
- Country: Canada
- Ecclesiastical province: Keewatin–Le Pas

Statistics
- Population: Total; Catholics: (as of 2016); 34,900; 7,450 (21.3%)
- Parishes: 12

Information
- Denomination: Catholic
- Sui iuris church: Latin Church
- Rite: Roman Rite
- Established: 3 December 1938
- Dissolved: 3 December 2018
- Cathedral: Christ the King Cathedral

The Diocese of Moosonee (Latin: Dioecesis Musonitana) was a Latin Catholic diocese that included part of the Province of Ontario.

As of 2016, the diocese contained 12 parishes with no active diocesan priests, 3 religious priests, and 7,450 Catholics. It also had 3 religious brothers.

On 3 December 2018, this Diocese merged with the Diocese of Hearst, to create the new Diocese of Hearst–Moosonee.

== History ==
- 3 December 1938: Established as the Apostolic Vicariate of Baie de James from the Diocese of Haileybury and Apostolic Vicariate of Northern Ontario.
- 13 July 1967: Elevated as the Diocese of Moosonee.
- 31 May 2007: Lost territory to the Roman Catholic Diocese of Amos.
- 3 December 2018: Officially suppressed and its territory united into the Roman Catholic Diocese of Hearst to create the Roman Catholic Diocese of Hearst–Moosonee.

== Diocesan bishops ==
The following is a list of the Vicars apostolic and bishops of Moosonee and their terms of service:

- Henri Belleau, OMI (1939–1964)
- Jules Leguerrier, OMI (1964–1992)
- Vincent Cadieux, OMI (1991–2016)
  - From 2007 to 2016, he served as Bishop of Hearst as well, an appointment that joined the two dioceses only through him, in persona episcopi, but did not create a single diocesan administration.
- Robert Bourgon (Apostolic Administrator 2016–2018)
