= St. Pius X High School shooting =

1975 school shooting in Ottawa, Canada

- Location: Ottawa, Ontario, Canada
- Date: 27 October 1975; 51 years ago c. 2:30 p.m. (ETZ)
- Attack type: School shooting; spree killing; rape; mass shooting
- Weapons: Winchester Model 1200 shotgun; Knife
- Deaths: 3 (including the perpetrator)
- Injuries: 5
- Perpetrator: Robert Poulin

On 27 October 1975, a mass shooting took place at St. Pius X High School in Ottawa, Ontario, Canada. The gunman, Robert Poulin, an 18-year-old St. Pius student, opened fire on his classmates with a shotgun, killing 17-year-old classmate Mark Hough and wounding five others before killing himself with a shotgun blast to the head.

Earlier that day, Poulin had killed his neighbor, 17-year-old Glebe Collegiate Institute student Kim Rabot after luring her inside his room at the family home. Rabot, originally from Sri Lanka, was an acquaintance of Poulin for three years, with Poulin blaming his "shyness" for never asking her out; Rabot was already in a relationship with another boy by the time of her murder. After handcuffing Rabot to his bed, he raped her before mortally wounding Rabot with a knife. Poulin's mother interrupted the rape when she asked her son to eat lunch with him. Before leaving, Poulin set fire to the house.

Poulin was from a military family and told his parents that he planned to become a pilot within the Royal Canadian Air Force. He was rejected from the officer training program because of his physical condition and psychological immaturity, the former including poor eyesight and a pigeon chest deformity. He instead trained in a government-sponsored militia group.

Poulin had been suicidal for at least three years prior to the attack and was obsessed with sex and pornography, having repeatedly written in his diaries about his desire to experience sex before he died. He was later identified as a suspect in a series of indecent assaults and attempted rapes. The physical description of the assault suspect, who only wore a balaclava, matched Poulin, who wrote he would wear a balaclava if he committed rape. A search of his room found 250 pornographic books and magazines, bondage photographs depiciting women tied to bed posts, four pairs of handcuffs, women's lingerie, an inflatable sex doll, and a vibrator. Also recovered was a binder with "nearly one thousand separate entries", which included various violent fantasies such as killing his parents in a housefire and raping girls he knew at knifepoint, with a list of eighteen girls including Kim Rabot. Other girls on the list reported receiving "obscene phone calls" which stopped after the shooting.

The 1977 book Rape of a Normal Mind was based on the shooting.

== See also ==
- Robert Joseph Bedard, religion teacher at the time of the shooting
- Brampton Centennial Secondary School shooting, Canada's first recorded school shooting

== Cited works and further reading ==
- Cawthorne, Nigel; Tibballs, Jeffrey (1994). Killers. Boxtree. pp. 265–270. ISBN 0-7522-0850-0.
- Cobb, Chris (1977). Rape of a Normal Mind. Paper Jacks. ISBN 978-0-770-10025-4.
- Mellor, Lee (2013). Rampage: Canadian Mass Murder and Spree Killing. Dundurn. ISBN 978-1-459-70722-1.
