= Companions of the Cross =

Roman Catholic society of apostolic life

- Compañeros de la Cruz
- Abbreviation: CC
- Formation: May 1985; 41 years ago
- Founder: Rev. Robert 'Bob' Bedard, CC
- Type: Roman Catholic Society of Apostolic Life of Diocesan Right
- Headquarters: 199 Bayswater Avenue, Ottawa, Ontario
- Members: 65 (includes 52 priests) as of May 2025
- General Superior: Fr. Simon Lobo, CC
- Vocations Director: Fr. Alex Colautti, CC
- Ministry: Pastors, teachers, chaplains, and conducting parish missions
- Publication: Missio Newsletter
- Parent organization: Catholic Church
- Website: www.companionscross.org

The Companions of the Cross, abbreviated CC, is a Catholic society of apostolic life of diocesan right for men based in Ottawa, Ontario. It is a community of Catholic priests that is Eucharistic, Charismatic, Marian and magisterial.

It was founded by Fr. Robert Bedard in 1985 and was approved in 2003 by the Vatican as a society of apostolic life. Fr. Simon Lobo, CC is currently serving as the community's superior general.

== History ==
Robert Bedard (1929–2011) was born July 17, 1929, in Ottawa, Ontario. In 1951, he entered St. Augustine's Seminary in Toronto and was ordained a priest on June 6, 1955. As a curate at Assumption Parish in Eastview (now Vanier), he was involved in youth ministry and formed a small group of young men aged 12 to 16 to encourage vocations to the priesthood.

While teaching at St. Pius X Preparatory Seminary, he attended Teachers College, Ontario College of Education in Toronto. In 1975, he was appointed official Ottawa Archdiocesan Liaison to the Charismatic Renewal, and from 1977 to 1981 he lived in a community household of men as chaplain of the New Jerusalem Community. He founded the Companions of the Cross in 1985, out of what had initially been a prayer and support group for seminarians and priests that began informally in 1984. According to Ottawa Archbishop Terrence Prendergast, a Jesuit who invited the Companions to Halifax when he was archbishop there, Bedard's "...main thing was to support seminarians in their formation and support priests in their priesthood by community life." Bedard stressed a model of companionship that sees priests serving several parishes living in community in one place.

From the beginning, the Companions have had an associate program for laity who "desires to embrace the spirituality and mission of the Companions of the Cross" through a formal commitment.

In 2003, with the permission of the community's then-moderator, Fr. Roger Vandenakker, Sr. Anna Chan founded the Servants of the Cross, a community of religious women formed around Fr. Bedard's spiritual vision. Sr. Chan remained with the Servants of the Cross until her death in 2025.

== Companions of the Cross ==
The new community of seminarians and priests adopted the name Companions of the Cross, after Bedard used the phrase in a homily for the Feast of the Triumph of the Cross. In February 1988 Archbishop Plourde granted the Companions of the Cross recognition as a Public Association of the Faithful. In 1999 the first Companions of the Cross ministries outside of the Archdiocese of Ottawa were established at St. Timothy's Parish and the Catholic Chaplaincy at York University in Toronto, Ontario and Queen of Peace Parish in Houston, Texas. In 1999, the Companions of the Cross assumed leadership of the Catholic Charismatic Center in Houston. The Companions were formally established as a Society of Apostolic Life in 2003.

In 2011, the Companions took over pastoral responsibility for St. Scholastica Parish in northwest Detroit, Michigan. They also assumed the Catholic chaplaincy at Wayne State University. The community's seminarians study at Sacred Heart Major Seminary, and priests and seminarians reside at the Companions of the Cross House of Formation (Visitation House) on 17330 Quincy St. (formerly owned by the PIME Missionaries)in Detroit. The U.S. headquarters of the Companions was re-located from Houston, Texas, to Detroit.

On January 7, 2014, Christian Riesbeck was appointed auxiliary Bishop of Ottawa by Pope Francis. He is the first Companions priest to be ordained to the episcopacy. Riesbeck was ordained to the priesthood on October 12, 1996, and was ordained to the episcopate on March 19, 2014, at Notre Dame Cathedral in Ottawa. Bishop Riesbeck is currently serving as the Bishop of the Diocese of Saint John. The Companions' General Superior Scott McCaig said, "It becomes his full-time job," and "Rome releases bishops from any obligations to the constitution and rules of a community."

Just over two years later, Scott was also elected to become a bishop by the Pope. "It is with great joy and gratitude to God that the Companions of the Cross announce that Fr. Scott McCaig CC has been named Bishop of the Military Ordinariate of Canada by His Holiness Pope Francis." This occurred on April 8, 2016, and the ordination was held on May 31, 2016, from 7:00 pm to 10:00 pm.

On September 2, 2016, the Companions elected Allan MacDonald as General Superior for a six-year term. MacDonald resigned as General Superior effective July 13, 2019, and was replaced by Michael Scherrey on an interim basis. During a General Assembly meeting in Detroit, Michigan, in January 2020, Roger Vandenakker was appointed as the new General Superior on January 31, 2020, for a period of six years. Vandenakker had most recently been the pastor at St. Timothy's parish in Toronto, Ontario, since July 2014.

== Spirituality ==
1. Prayer - Which is both time spent in private personal prayer (minimum of one hour daily) and in groups together, the members pray together (praise and listening to God). The Companions are a Charismatic community. Prayer tends to include spontaneous prayer and part of the Liturgy of the Hours.
2. Living in Community - Members live together in community to support one another.
3. Work - The community of the Companions is one dedicated to active service in their cities, especially in the inner core. They do the work assigned by their diocese which always involves evangelization. The community feels a special calling to the poor, to youth and to those estranged from the church.

== Apostolate ==
Priests of the Companions of the Cross can be found serving as pastors, teachers, chaplains, and conducting parish missions. They also conduct a special travelling ministry of relic expositions. They promote exposition and adoration of the Blessed Sacrament in each of their parishes, and perpetual adoration if possible. The Companions of the Cross have foundations in Ottawa, Toronto, Halifax, Houston, and Detroit. In these five cities, they serve in 15 Parishes and university chaplaincy. Including Bishops Scott McCaig and Christian Riesbeck, there are 48 ordained priests and 17 seminarians. Priests include for example Fr. Carlos Martins and Fr. Mark Goring

One Companion priest also serves as a professor at Sacred Heart Major Seminary in Detroit.

== Vision ==
A definition of the beliefs, practices and goals of the Companions is:

- To give God permission to use the members however He wants.
- To seek God's will and follow it.
- To surrender fully to Jesus as Lord and Saviour
- To regard Eucharist as the source and summit of their Catholic faith, and promoting its Exposition and Adoration

"We are a Roman Catholic community of priests, committed to living and ministering together as brothers in the Lord. We are called to the ongoing renewal of the Church through a dynamic evangelization in the wisdom and power of the Holy Spirit. We proclaim the Good News of Jesus Christ to all we are called to serve, with special attention to parish communities, the poor, youth, and those alienated from the Church."

The Companions wear a distinctive "Community Cross" medallion at all times, as a sign of their commitment to the community. The medallion features a silhouette of a man embracing a cross. The cross is red for members who have made lifetime promises and white for members who have made temporary promises. Members who have not yet made promises wear a simple wooden cross. Lay associates of the order wear the same symbol in the form of a lapel pin.

== See also ==
- Consecrated life
- Institutes of consecrated life
- Religious institute (Catholic)
- Secular institute
- Vocational Discernment in the Catholic Church
