= Knox College, Toronto =

Federated college of the University of Toronto

Knox College
- Federated college
- University of Toronto
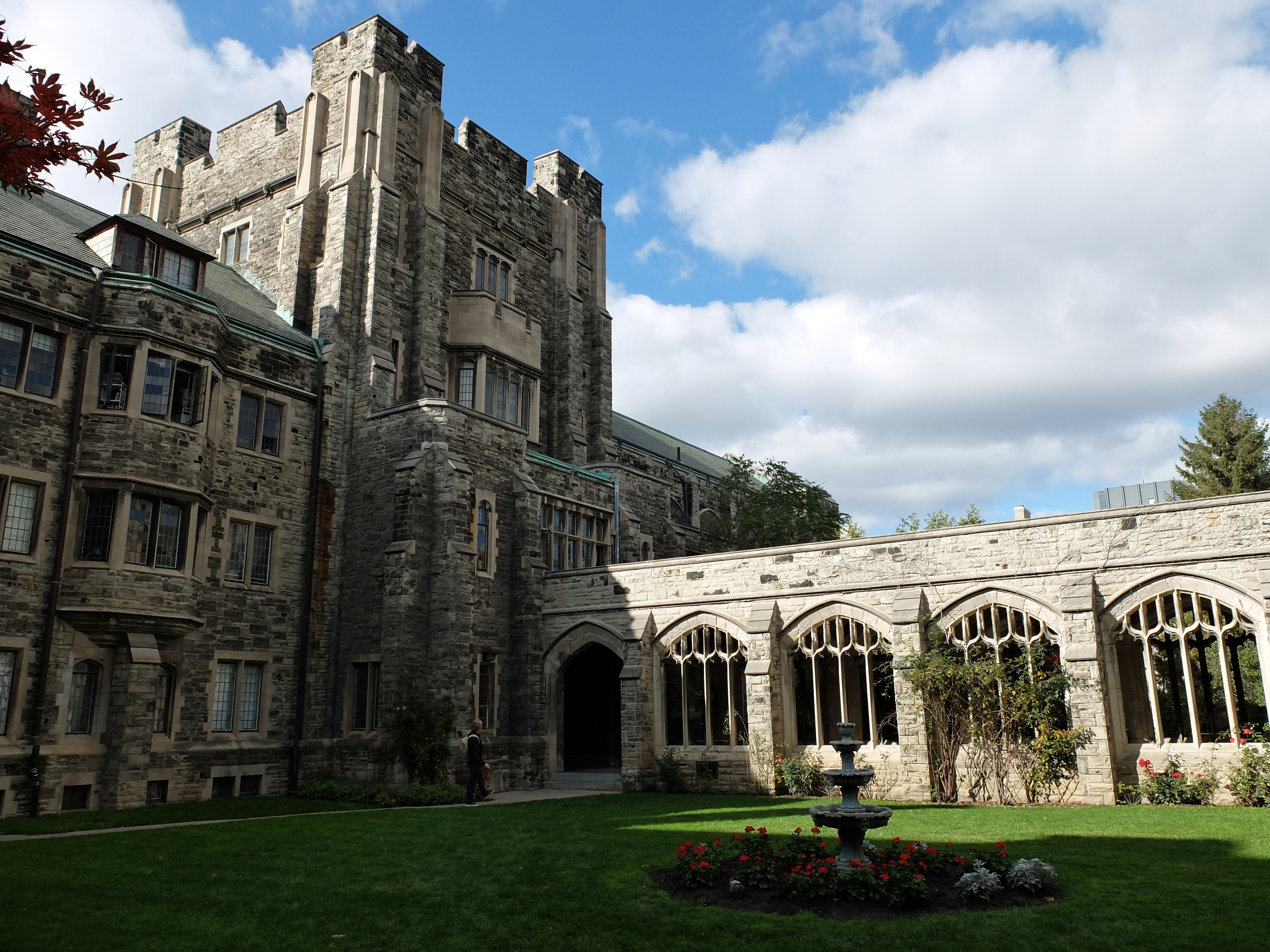
- Knox College quadrangle

- Arms: Per saltire Argent and Purpure, in chief a terrestrial globe Azure its lines of latitude and longitude Argent, in base a bush enflamed proper.
- Location: 59 St. George Street, Toronto, Ontario, Canada
- Coordinates: 43°39′41″N 79°23′47.5″W
- Motto: Verbum dat lucem (Latin)
- Motto in English: "The word gives light"
- Established: November 5, 1844 (181 years ago)
- Named for: John Knox
- Principal: Ernest van Eck
- Affiliations: Presbyterian Church; AUCC (full membership through the University of Toronto); ATS (accreditation); TST
- Website: knox.utoronto.ca

Ontario Heritage Act
- Criteria: Designated Part IV
- Designated: Jan 10, 1983

Knox College is a federated college of the University of Toronto and seminary of the Presbyterian Church in Canada. It is located on the St. George campus in Toronto, Ontario, Canada. Knox College was founded in 1844 as part of a schism movement in the Church of Scotland following the Disruption of 1843. It confers doctoral degrees as a founding member school of the Toronto School of Theology.

== History ==
Controversy arising from the issue of state control in the Church of Scotland led to the Disruption of 1843 and the establishment of the Free Church of Scotland. In response, several Presbyterian ministers and congregations within the Canadian synod of the Church of Scotland switched their affiliation to the new denomination. Queen's College, a Presbyterian seminary in Kingston, decided in 1844 to remain affiliated with the Church of Scotland, prompting some of its students to defect and establish Knox College in Toronto. Named for Scottish Reformation theologian John Knox, the new college became affiliated with the Free Church.

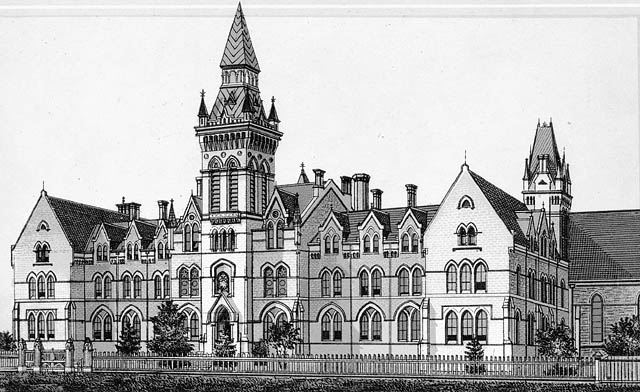
Historical home of Knox College at 1 Spadina Crescent, prior to 1915

The first class included 14 students and took place on November 5, 1844, in the home of Rev. Henry Esson on James Street, at the present site of Toronto Eaton Centre. For the next two years, Knox College transitioned to larger buildings acquired at Adelaide Street and later Front Street, at the present site of the Fairmont Royal York Hotel. Scottish minister Rev. Dr. Michael Willis, the founding president of the Anti-Slavery Society of Canada (1851), became the first principal of the college in 1857. Willis came to Toronto in 1846 from St. John's Renfield Church, Glasgow, where he followed Thomas Chalmers and took part in the Disruption of 1843. Knox was formally granted its charter from the colonial government in 1858, thereby possessing the authority to confer academic degrees.

In 1861, the Canada Presbyterian Church was created from the union of the Canadian synods of the Free Church of Scotland with the United Presbyterian Church of Scotland. Knox College absorbed the existing United Presbyterian Church theological college that was founded in London, Canada West in 1844. In 1867, Knox College assisted the establishment of The Presbyterian College, Montreal, as the second theological college affiliated with the Canadian Presbyterian Church. Knox College donated some of the books from its library collection, and several Knox alumni served as faculty of The Presbyterian College.

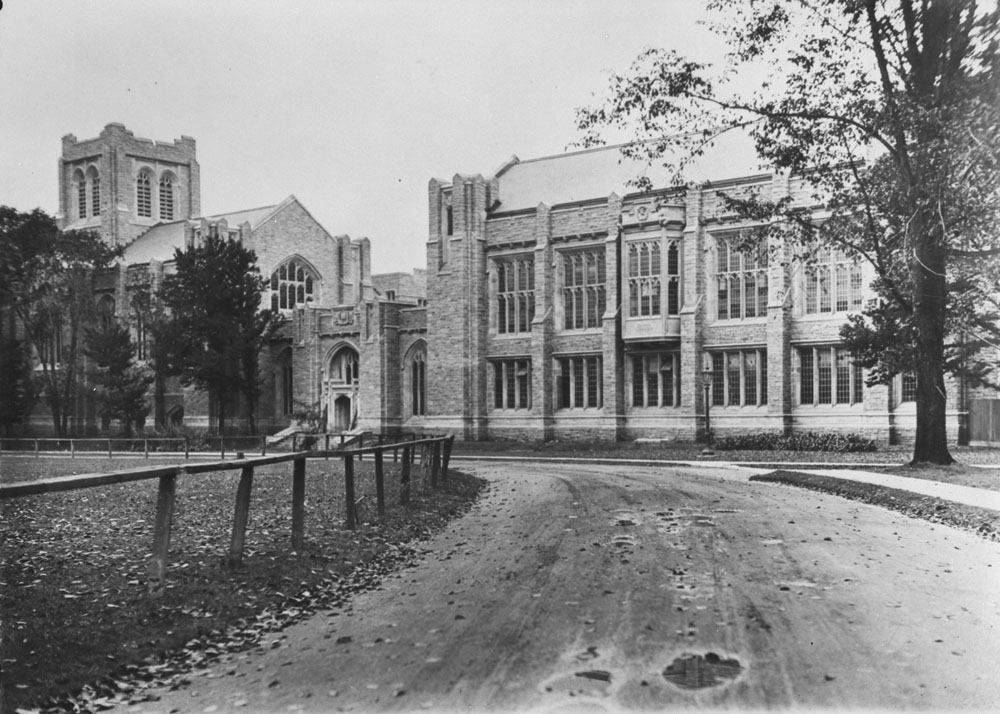
Historical photo (date unknown) of the current Knox College building that opened in 1915

In 1875, Knox College moved to a new Gothic-revival building at 1 Spadina Crescent, and operated as the main seminary for the newly formed Presbyterian Church in Canada. Towards the end of the century, Knox began encouraging its students to attend non-divinity studies at the nearby University College of the University of Toronto. Knox College entered formal affiliation with the University of Toronto in 1885. In 1890, Knox College became part of the university within a federated governance structure. In 1915, Knox College moved to its present site adjacent to University College. During World War II, Knox College accommodated faculty and students from The Presbyterian College, Montreal, whose building was used for military training until 1946.

In 1969, Knox became a founding member of the Toronto School of Theology. By virtue of an amendment of its charter, Knox College has granted theology degrees conjointly with the university and the Toronto School of Theology since 1978. Ewart College, a women's college of the Presbyterian Church, was merged into Knox College in 1991. Founded in 1897, Ewart College was initially known as the Presbyterian Missionary and Deaconess Training School and then Ewart Missionary Training Home after Catherine Seaton Ewart in 1960. In 2005, Knox observed its 160th anniversary with a visit and lecture by Alison Elliot, the Moderator of the General Assembly of the Church of Scotland.

== Campus and architecture ==
The current Knox College building on the St. George campus, completed in 1915, was designed by architectural firm Chapman & McGiffin and reflects the Collegiate Gothic style that was once popular in North America. It has a U-shaped layout that surrounds a cloister or courtyard in the centre. The cloister is divided into two parts by a roofed walkway which crosses between the east and west wings of the building. The building itself includes offices, residences, a library hall (Caven Library), and a chapel. The Gothic style of the structure is evident throughout, but is most accentuated inside the lobby in the eastern wing of the building (at the entrance from King's College Circle), which is characterized by columns rising into fan vaults. Staircases in this lobby provide access to the chapel on the south side and the library on the north side.

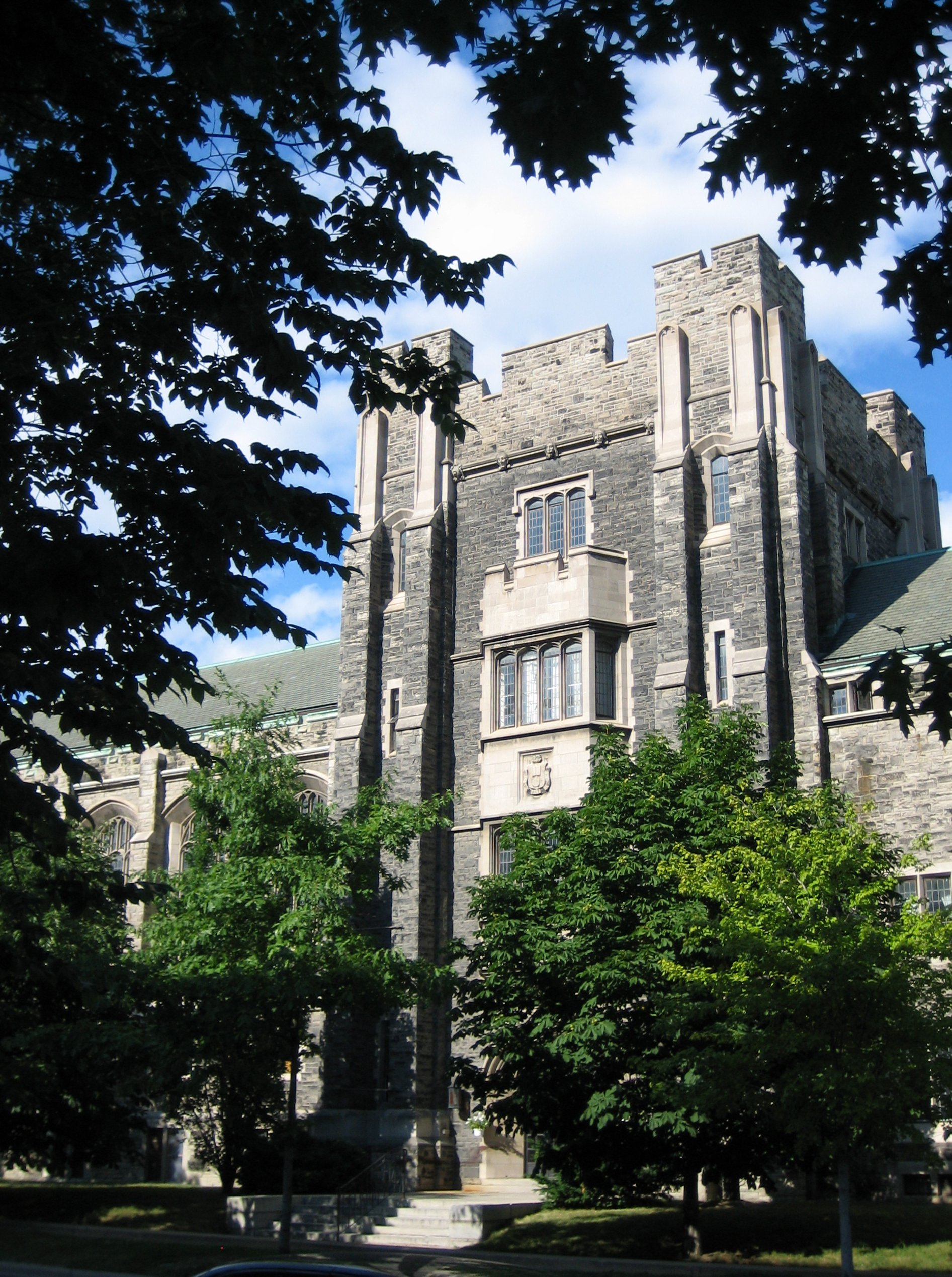
Western entrance and façade (on St. George Street)

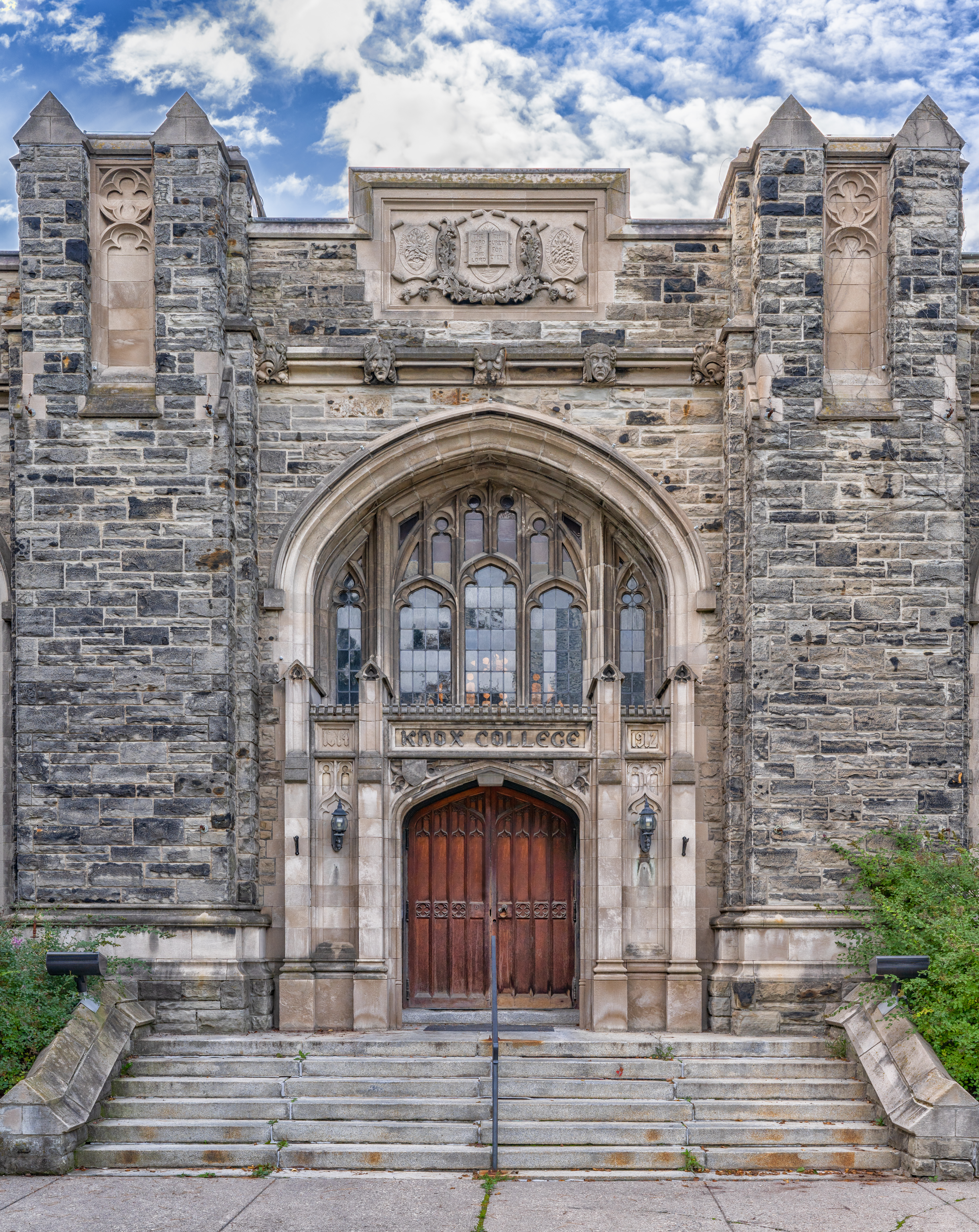
Eastern entrance (on King's College Circle)

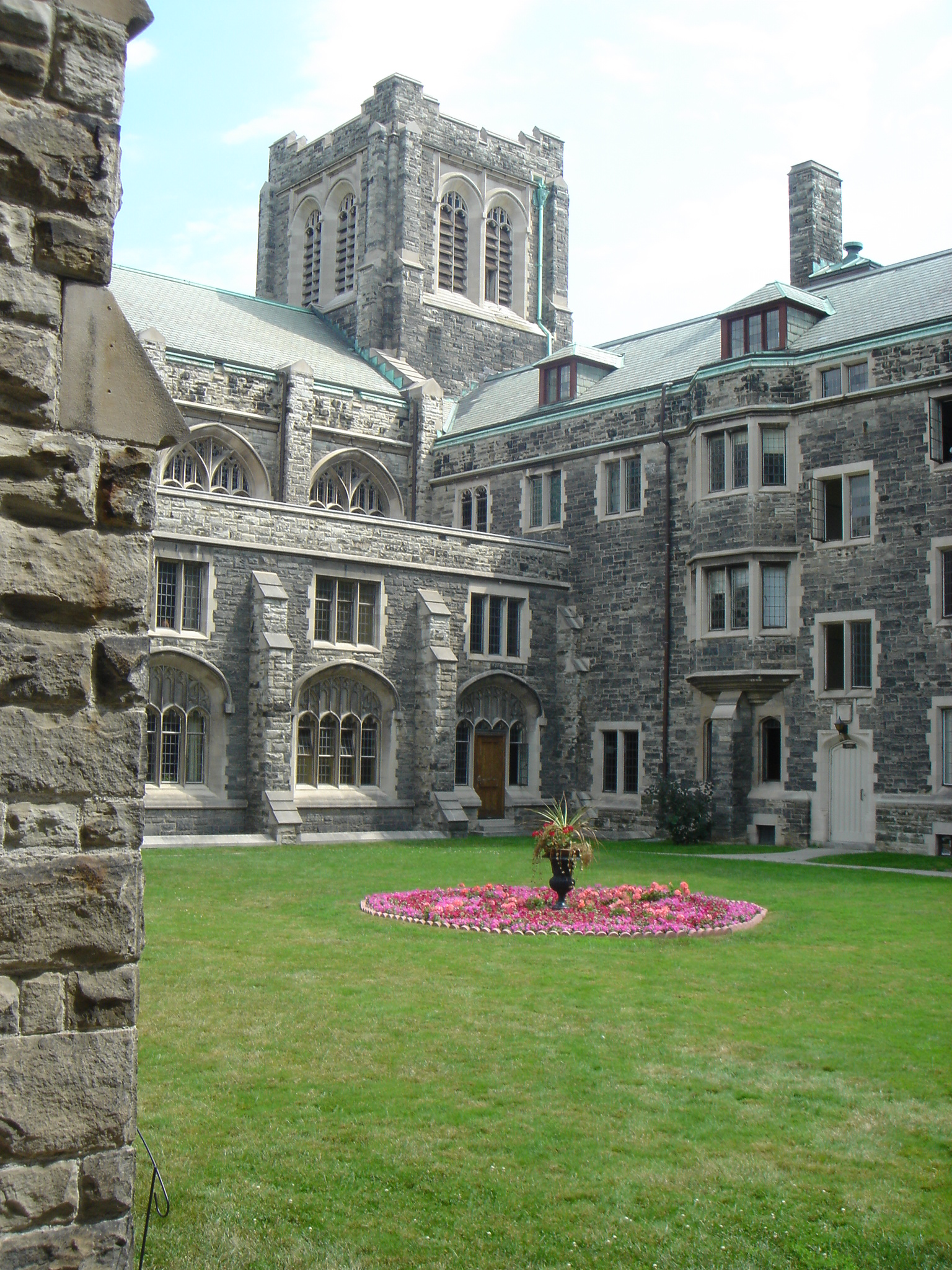
One of the two internal cloisters

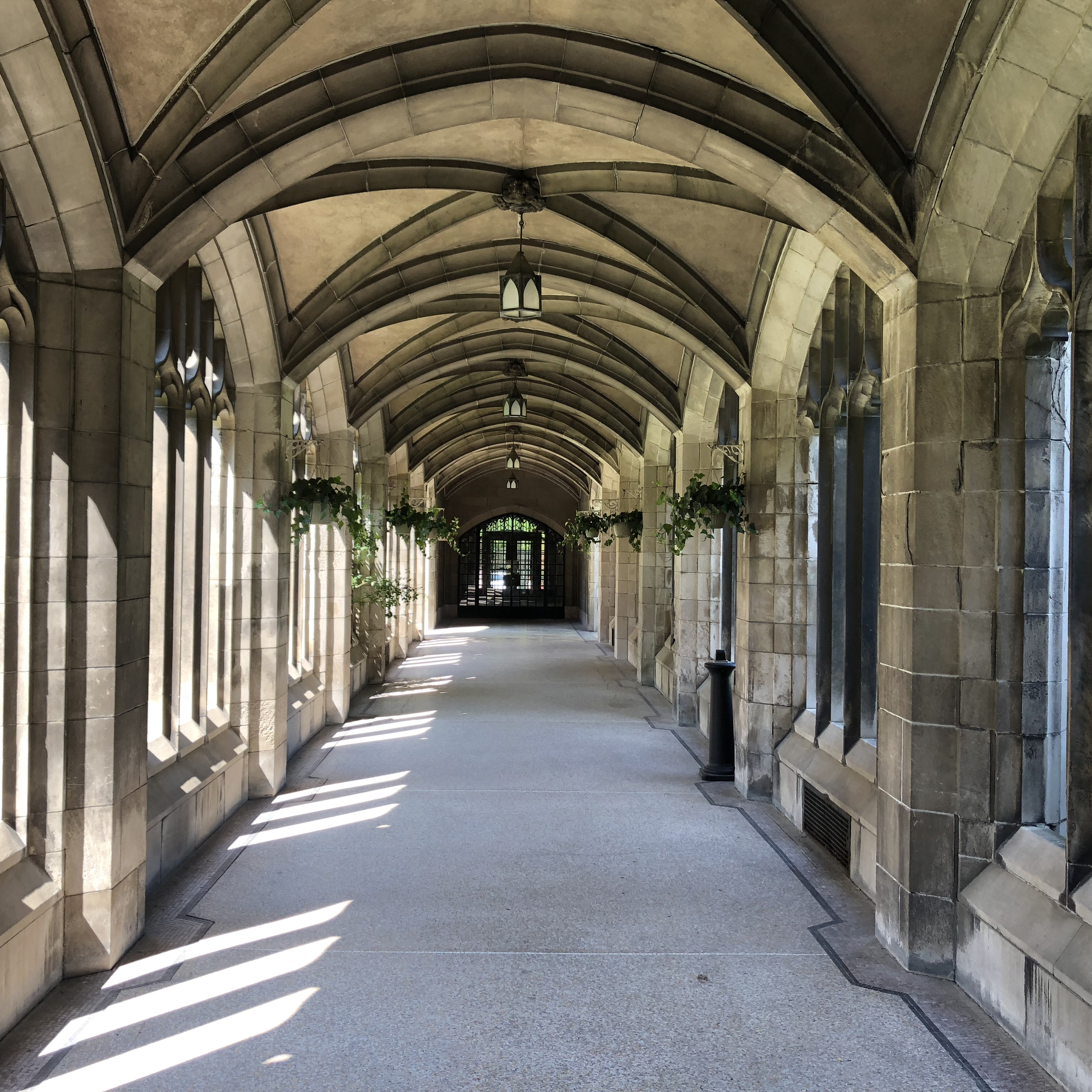
The vaulted walkway that crosses between the cloisters

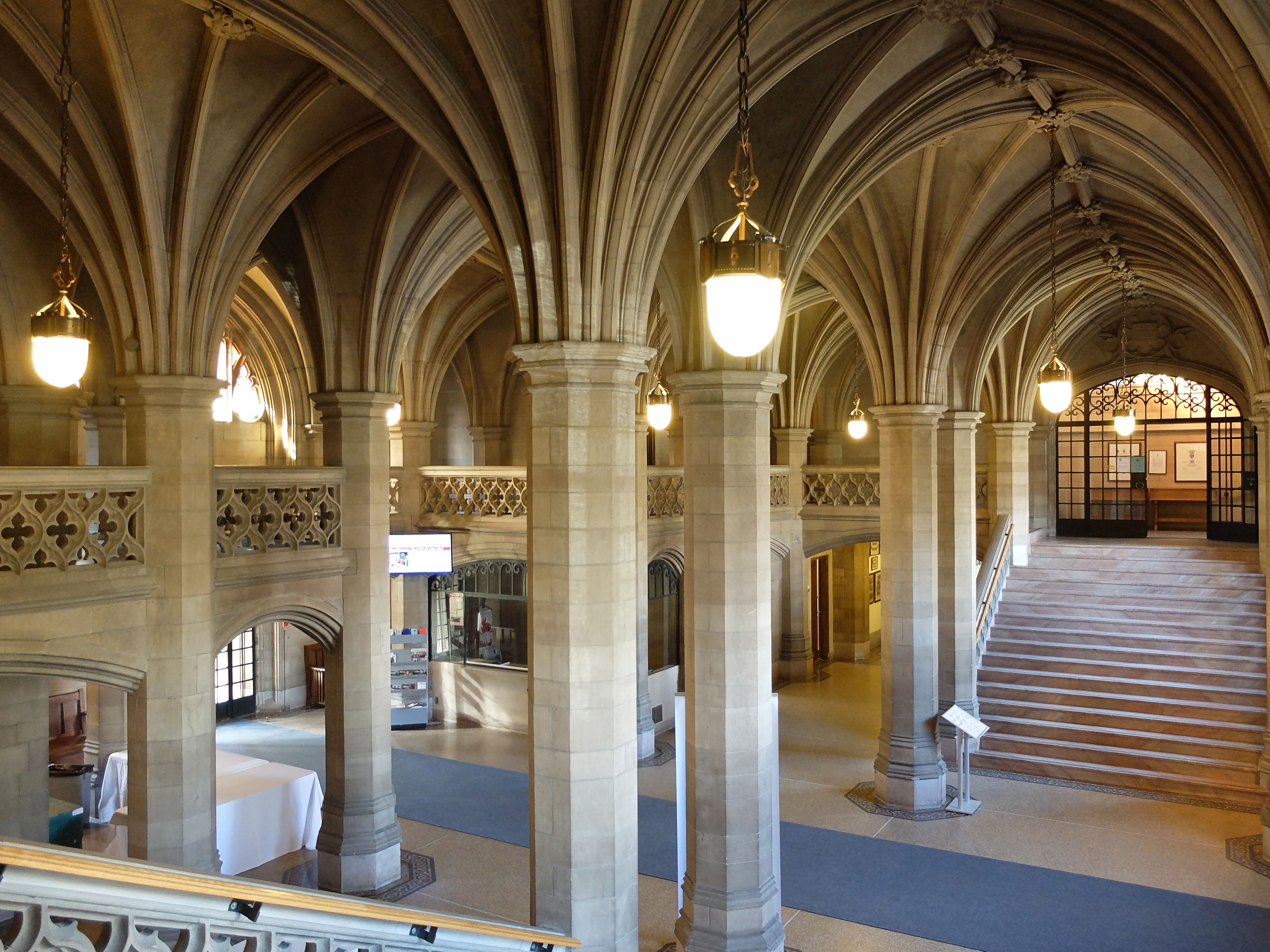
Lobby of the eastern wing of the building, with Gothic fan vaults

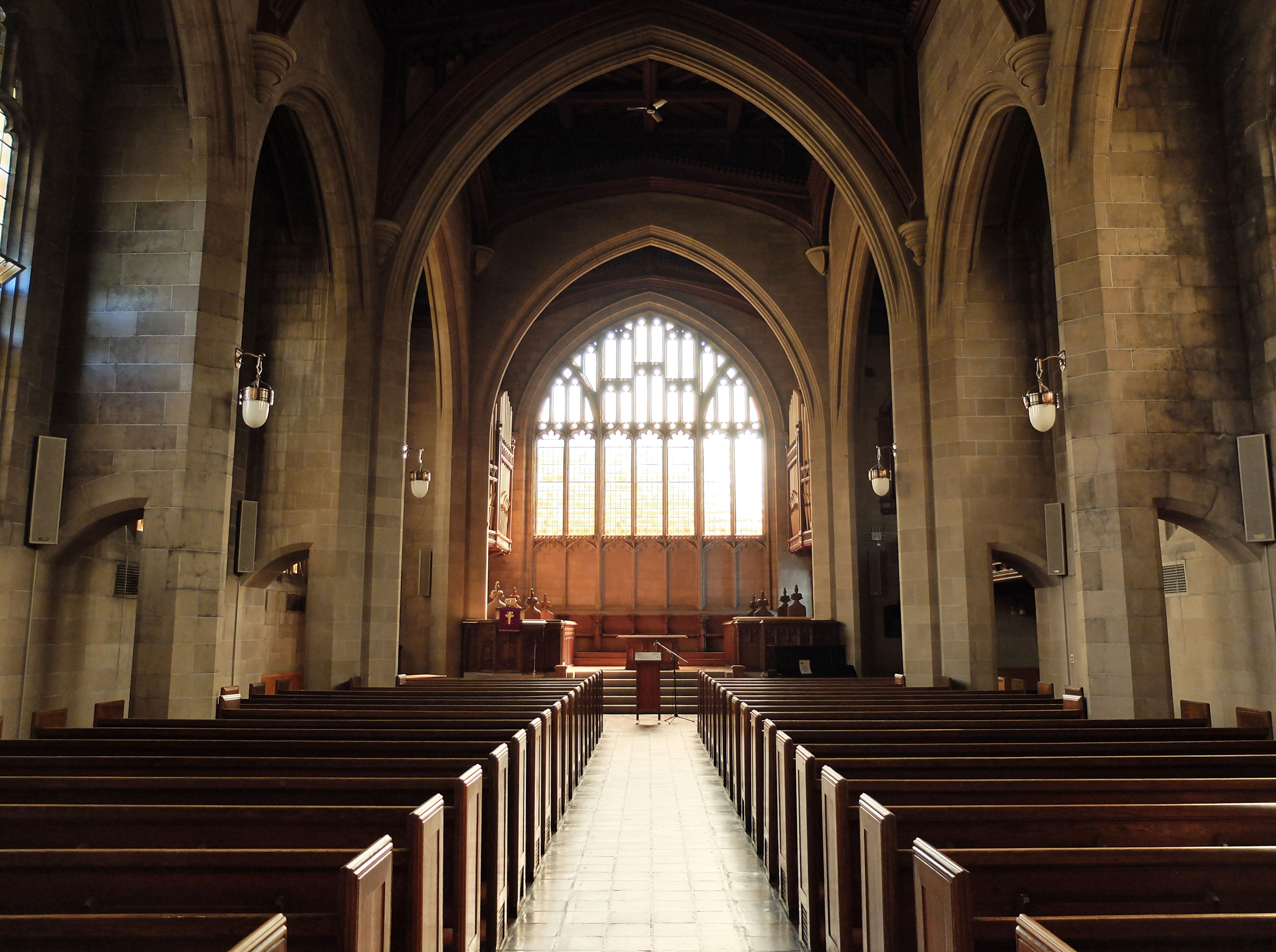
The chapel (looking south towards the altar)

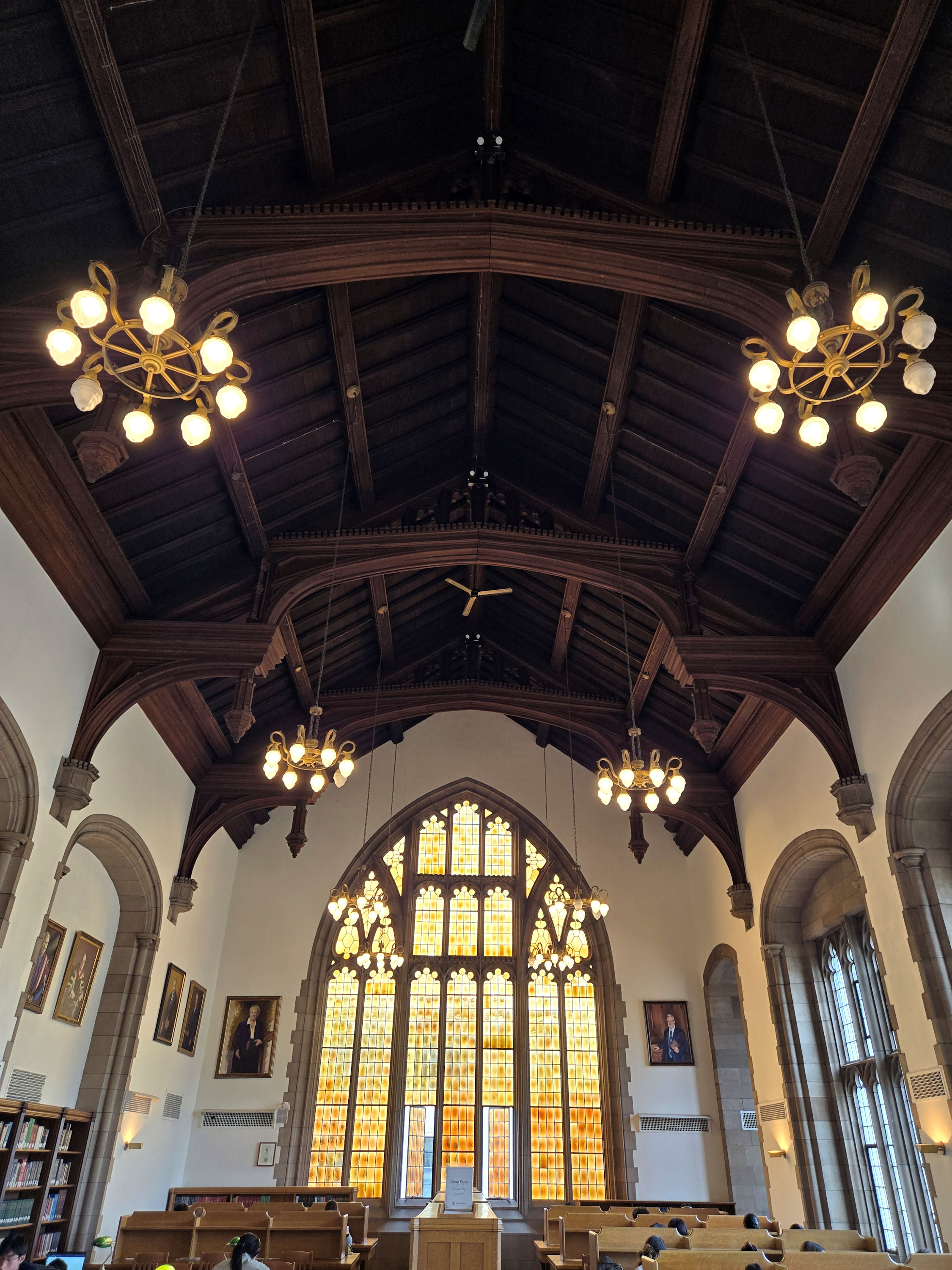
Caven Library

=== Chapel ===
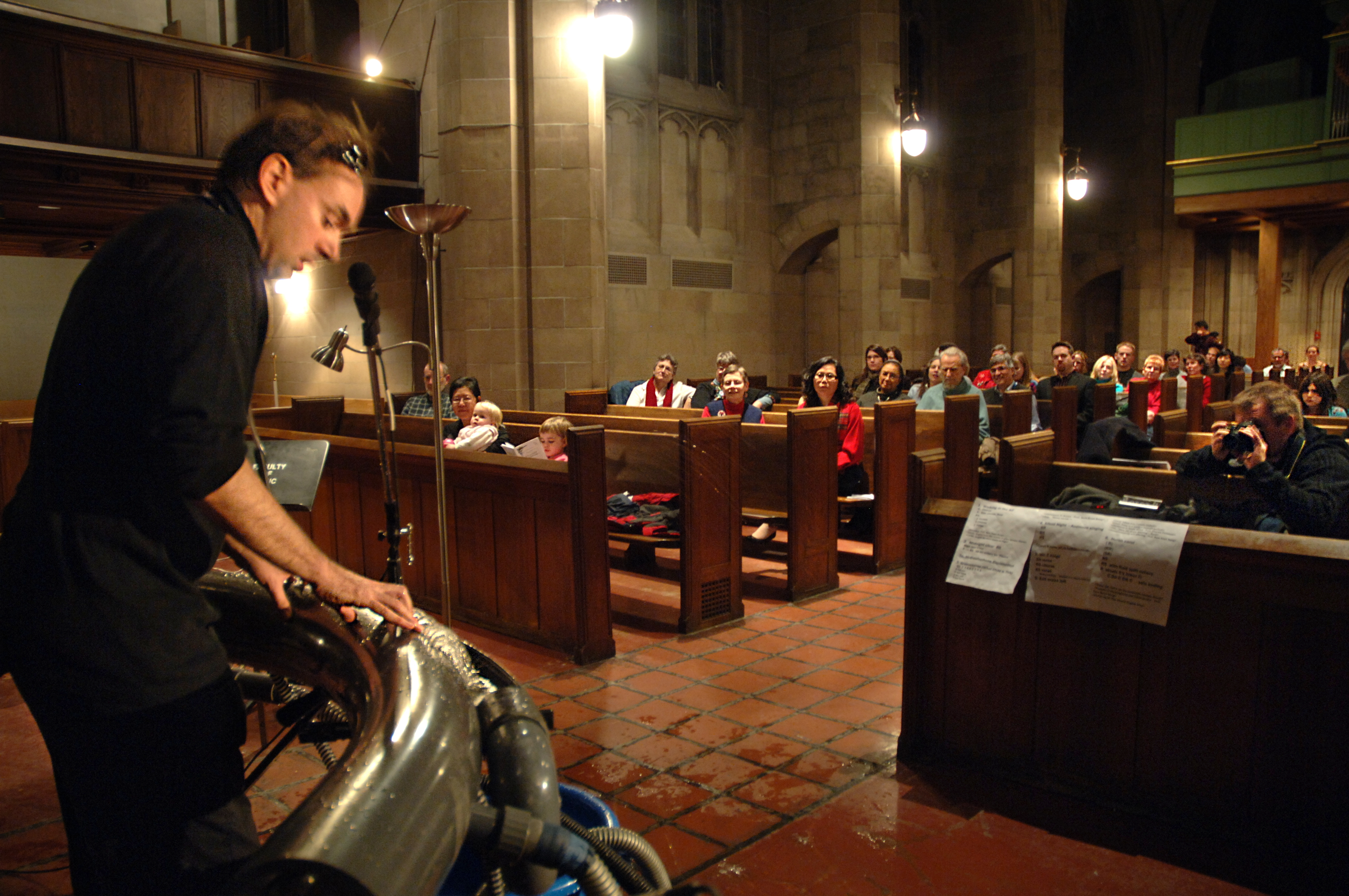
Performance at the Knox College Chapel

The chapel is one of the facilities Knox college provides to the University of Toronto community. It is noted for its Hellmuth Wolff organ. The chapel has a large south-facing window of amber-stained glass. Seating is provided by two rows of pews on either side of the central aisle. There is a front piece in front of the frontmost pews for hymn books of those at the front of the congregation.

==== Chancel organ ====
This organ was built in 1915 by Casavant and is original to the building. It is split between two chambers at the front of the room and consists of 26 stops and 24 ranks. The console was replaced in 1959, and in 1974 a four-rank mixture was added to the Great. It has Ventil chests and electro-pneumatic action.

==== Gallery organ ====
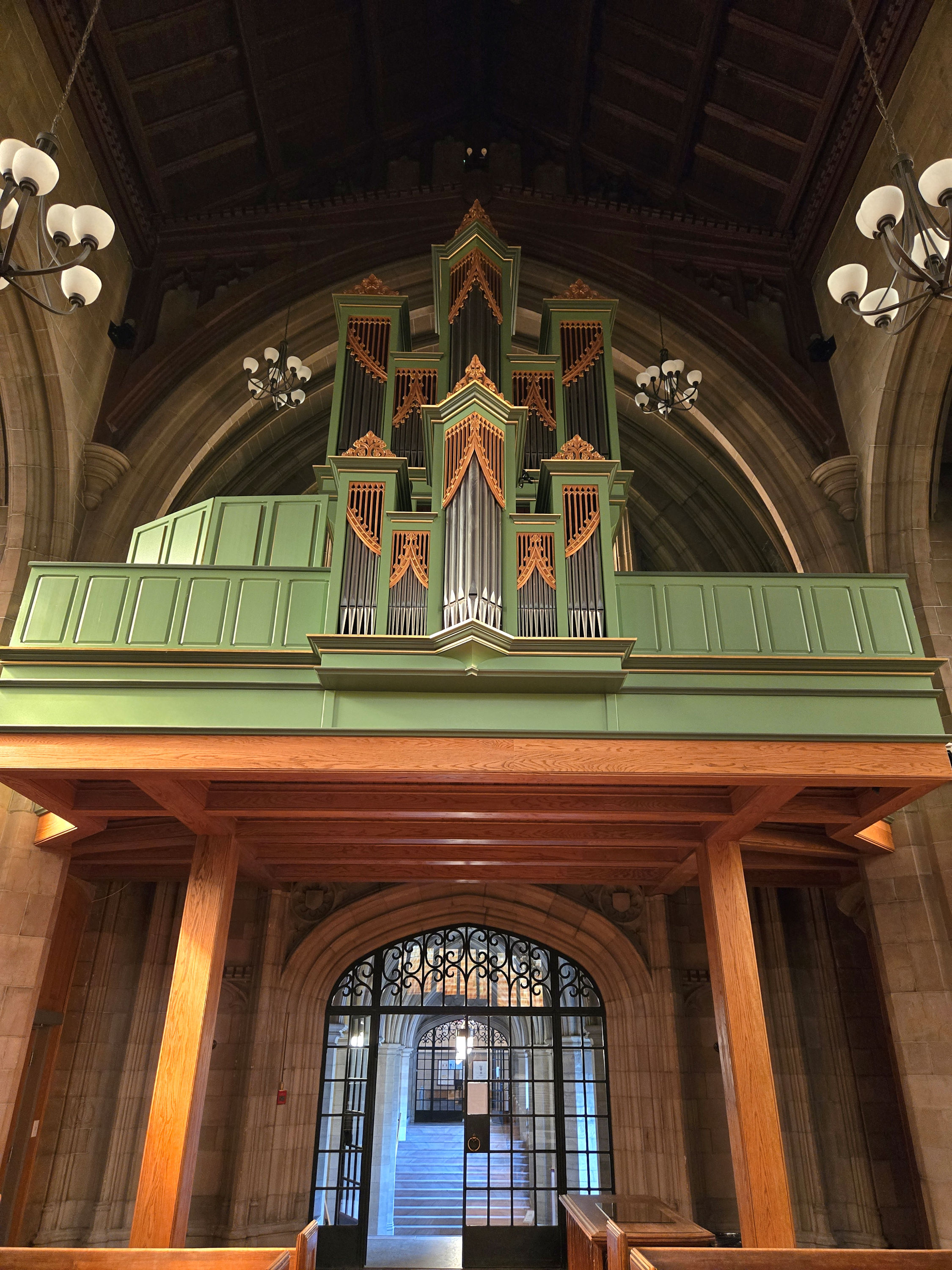
Organ in the gallery of the chapel

In 1991, a second, 32-stop, three-manual instrument was added in a new rear gallery. It is an historically oriented organ in the North German baroque style, built as Opus 33 by Wolff & Associés of Laval, Quebec. The pipework is modelled on the Johan Niclas Cahman organ at Leufsta Bruk, Sweden from 1726/28. The case, though, is a modern interpretation of north-European style that does not refer to any particular historic instrument.

The key action and stop action are both mechanical. The two bellows can be pumped either by foot or with an electric blower.

Notably, the Wolff organ is tuned to a modified fifth comma meantone temperament devised by Harald Vogel following 17th-century Swedish theorists. This same tuning has been used for the Arp Schnitger organ in Norden, Germany.

== Academics ==
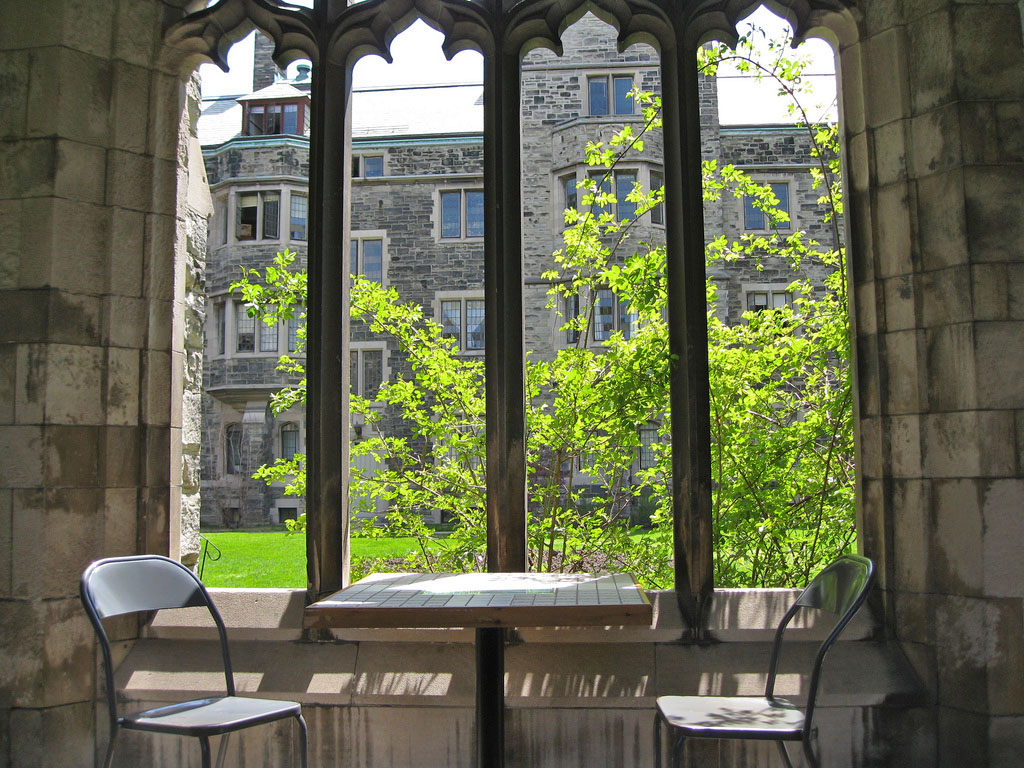
The cloister windows at Knox typify the collegiate Gothic architectural style.

Knox College is a postgraduate theological institution and seminary, conferring three basic degrees, four graduate degrees, and one certificate program. It administers both academic programs for the general-interest study of theology and professional programs. The basic degree and certificate program comprises the degrees of Master of Divinity, Master of Psychospiritual Studies (formerly known as the Master of Pastoral Studies), Master of Theological Studies, and Certificate in Theological Studies, all awarded conjointly with the University of Toronto. The graduate degrees of Master of Arts in Theology, Master of Theology, Doctor of Philosophy in Theological Studies and Doctor of Ministry are awarded conjointly with the University of Toronto.

- Certificate in Theological Studies (C.T.S.)
- Master of Divinity (M.Div.)
- Master of Psychospiritual Studies (M.P.S.)
- Master of Theological Studies (M.T.S.)
- Master of Arts in Theology (M.A.[Th.])
- Master of Theology (Th.M.)
- Doctor of Philosophy in Theological Studies (Ph.D.[T.S.])
- Doctor of Ministry (D.Min.)

== Principals ==
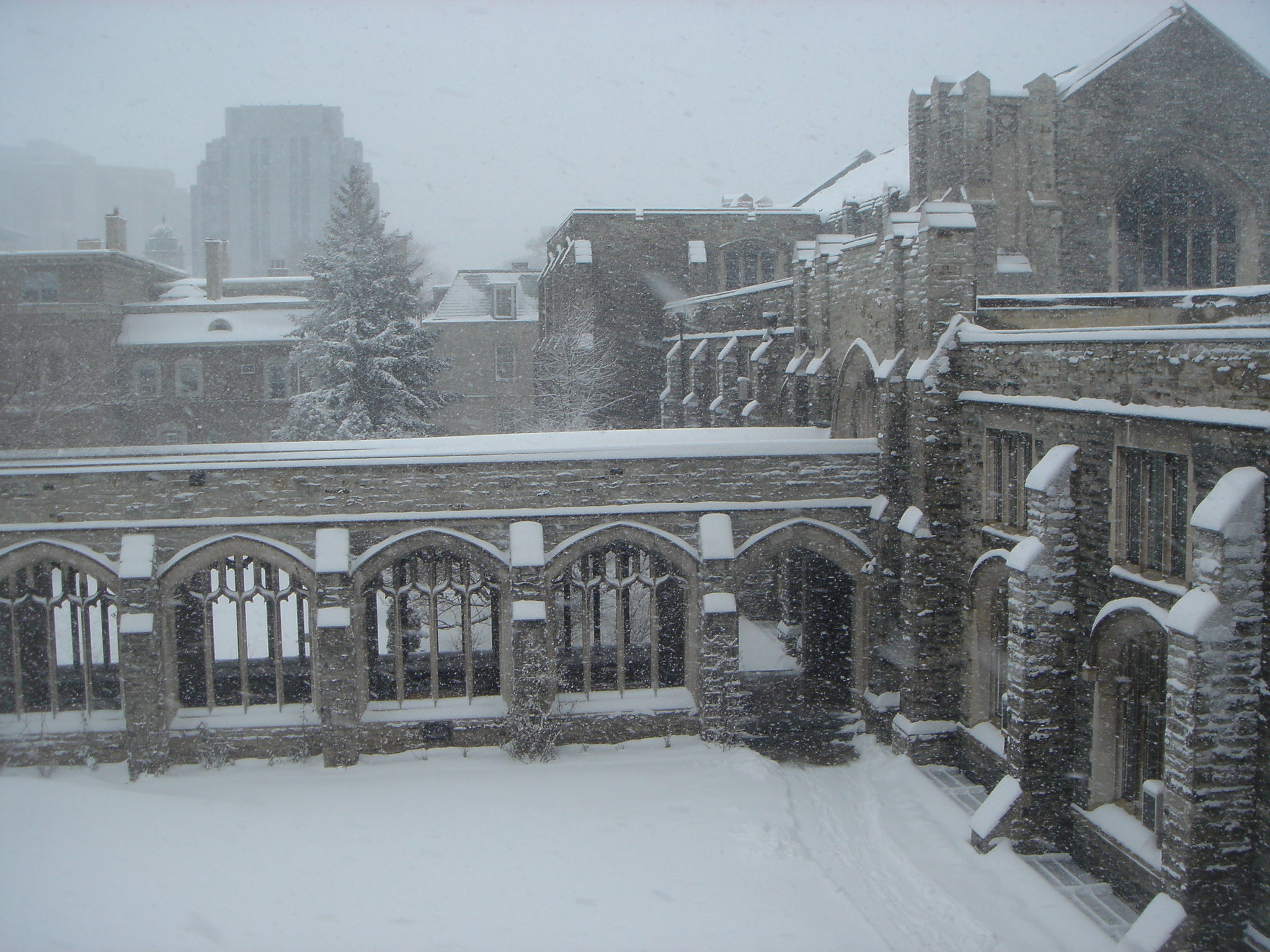
Knox College during a winter snowstorm

- Michael Willis (1857–1870)
- William Caven (1873–1904)
- William MacLaren (1904–1909)
- Alfred Gandier (1909–1925; became principal of Emmanuel College)
- Thomas Eakin (1926–1940)
- Walter W. Bryden (1945–1952)
- Stanley Glen (1952–1976)
- Allan Farris (1976–1977 death)
- J. Charles Hay (1978–1985)
- Donald J. M. Corbett (1985–1990)
- Arthur Van Seters (1992–1999)
- J. Dorcas Gordon (1999–2017)
- John A. Vissers (2017-2022)
- Ernest van Eck (2022-)

A number of faculty have served as Acting Principal during vacancies and sabbaticals. The convener of the Board of Governors of Knox College is Dr. Candace Grant.

== In popular culture ==
In the Season 2, episode 12 of Star Trek: Discovery, "Through the Valley of Shadows", the college was used as a filming location for the Klingon monastery on Boreth.
