= Diocese of Hearst–Moosonee =

Catholic ecclesiastical territory

Coordinates: 49.6842°N 83.6655°W

Diocese of Hearst–Moosonee Dioecesis Hearstensis et Musonitana

Location
- Country: Canada
- Ecclesiastical province: Ontario

Statistics
- Area: 1,108,830 km^{2} (428,120 sq mi)
- Population: Total; Catholics: (as of 2021); 66,820; 26,520 (39.7%)
- Parishes: 25

Information
- Denomination: Catholic Church
- Sui iuris church: Latin Church
- Rite: Roman Rite
- Established: 3 December 1938
- Cathedral: Notre-Dame-de-l'Assomption Cathedral
- Secular priests: 20

Current leadership
- Pope: Leo XIV
- Bishop: Pierre Olivier Tremblay, O.M.I.
- Bishops emeritus: Vincent Cadieux, OMI; Robert Bourgon

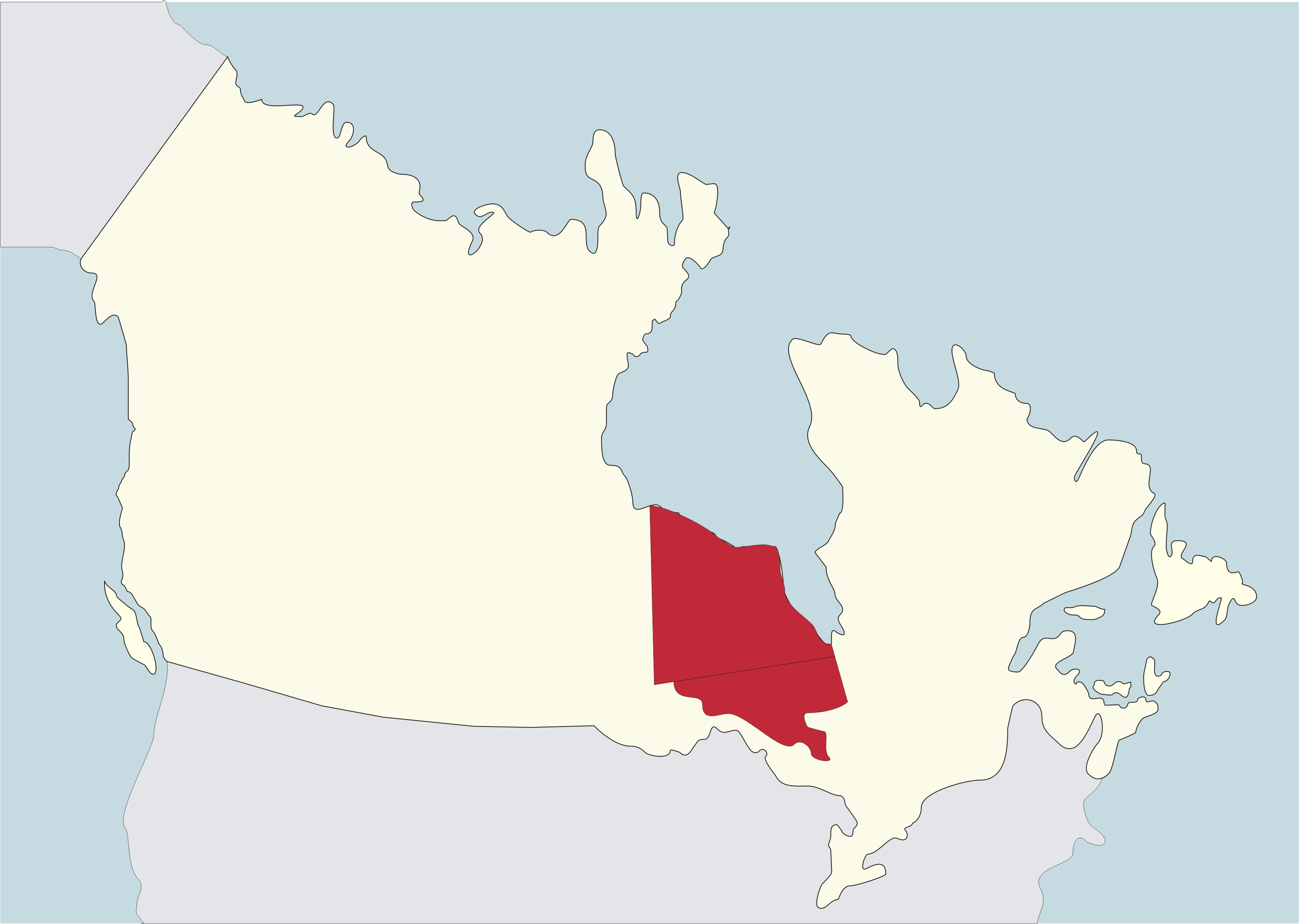
Map of the Roman Catholic Diocese of Hearst-Moosonee in Canada.

The Diocese of Hearst–Moosonee (Latin: Dioecesis Hearstensis) is a Latin Church ecclesiastical territory or diocese of the Catholic Church in Ontario. The diocese was erected on 3 December 2018 through the unification of the Diocese of Hearst and the Diocese of Moosonee. The Diocese of Hearst evolved from the Prefecture Apostolic of Northern Ontario erected on 18 April 1919. The Diocese of Hearst–Moonosee is a suffragan diocese in the ecclesiastical province of the metropolitan Archdiocese of Ottawa-Cornwall.

== History ==
The territory that would form the diocese was elevated to an apostolic vicariate on 17 November 1920.

== Ordinaries ==
- Joseph-Jean-Baptiste Hallé (1918 - 1939)
- Joseph Charbonneau (1939 - 1940), appointed Coadjutor Archbishop of Montréal, Québec
- Albini LeBlanc (1940 - 1945), appointed Bishop of Gaspé, Québec
- Georges-Léon Landry (1946 - 1952)
- Louis Lévesque (1952 - 1964), appointed Coadjutor Archbishop of Rimouski, Québec
- Jacques Landriault (1964 - 1971), appointed Bishop of Timmins, Ontario
- Roger-Alfred Despatie (1973 - 1993)
- Pierre Fisette, P.M.E. (1993 - 1995)
- André Vallée, P.M.E. (1996 - 2005)
- Vincent Cadieux, O.M.I. (2007 - 2016)
  - He continued as Bishop of Moosonee, a position he had held since 1991. This appointment joined the two dioceses only through him, in persona episcopi, but did not create a single diocesan administration.
- Robert Bourgon (2016 - 2020)
- Terrence Prendergast, S.J. (2020 - 2022) as Apostolic Administrator
- Pierre Olivier Tremblay, O.M.I. (2022 - present)

== Territorial losses ==
| Year | Along with | To form |
|---|---|---|
| 1938 | Diocese of Haileybury | Vicariate Apostolic of Baie de James |
