= St. Augustine's Seminary (Toronto) =

Roman Catholic seminary in Toronto, Canada

Coordinates: 43°42′47″N 79°14′30″W

St. Augustine's Seminary of Toronto
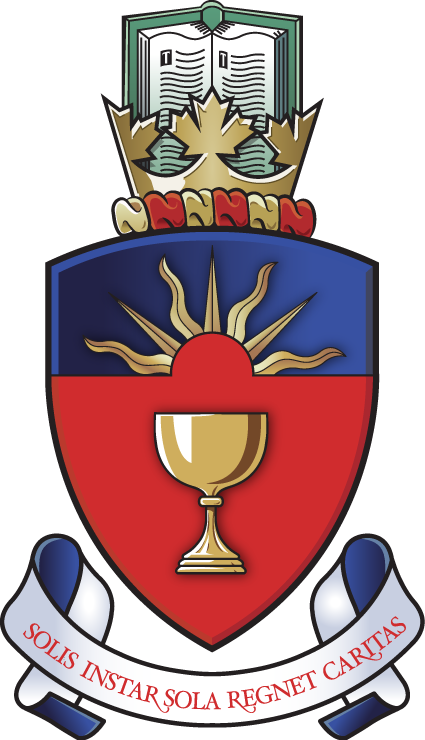
- The coat of arms of St. Augustine's Seminary of Toronto. Inscribed with "Solis instar sola regnet caritas," meaning "May love, like the sun, reign alone."
- Motto in English: "Come and Discover What You Were Made For"
- Type: Seminary
- Established: 1913; 113 years ago
- Religious affiliation: Roman Catholic Church
- Academic affiliations: ATS; TST
- Rector: Fr. Scott Birchall
- Faculty: 56 full-time, 13 part-time and 28 adjunct
- Location: Scarborough, Toronto, Ontario, Canada
- Campus: Suburban
- Colours: Red, blue and gold
- Website: www.staugustines.on.ca

St. Augustine's Seminary is the archdiocesan seminary of the Roman Catholic Archdiocese of Toronto, and is located by the shore of Lake Ontario in Scarborough, Ontario, Canada. It is a member of the Toronto School of Theology.

== History ==
St. Augustine's Seminary was established in 1913 to train diocesan priests. The land on which the Seminary was built was previously that of farmer and Anglican Adna Pherrill (1816–1892). Its construction was funded entirely by Eugene O'Keefe, a wealthy Toronto brewer and philanthropist who died months before its completion.

The Beaux-Arts architecture structure is topped off with a copper clad-dome. The architect was Arthur W. Holmes who designed numerous buildings in Toronto, such as St. Patrick's Church, Holy Name Church as well as St. Michael's College, part of the University of Toronto. He modelled the college chapel on the refectory of Queen's College, Oxford.

In 1969 the Toronto School of Theology was created as an independent federation of seven schools of theology, including the divinity faculties of St. Augustine's Seminary. Within its own federation, the University of Toronto granted all but theology or divinity degrees. Since 1978, by virtue of a change made in its charter, the university has granted theology degrees conjointly with St. Augustine's Seminary and other Toronto School of Theology member institutions.

== Mission ==
St. Augustine's Seminary is the Major Seminary of the Roman Catholic Archdiocese of Toronto. It also welcomes candidates from elsewhere. Although the main goal is the preparation of candidates for ordained priesthood in the Catholic Church, the seminary also prepares men and women aspiring to other ministries in the Church.

== Programs ==
St. Augustine Seminary and Institute of Theology offer the following programs, which combine spiritual formation, theological education and field training:

- Ecclesiastical Baccalaureate of Sacred Theology (S.T.B) / Master of Divinity (M.Div.)
- Master of Theological Studies (M.T.S.)
- Master of Religious Education (M.R.E.)
- Conjoint Certificate in Theological Studies (C.T.S.)
- Conjoint Certificate in Theology and Interreligious Engagement (C.T.I.E.)
- Diploma in Theological Studies (D.T.S.)
- Diploma in Lay Ministry (D.L.M.)
- Licentiate in Theology and Patristic Studies (S.T.L.)
- Diploma in Philosophy

== Residence ==
St. Augustine Seminary provides residence for candidates to the priesthood. Other students live in off-campus housing.

=== Burial grounds ===
A list of notables buried at St. Augustine:

- Fergus Patrick McEvay, Archbishop of Toronto
- Neil McNeil, Archbishop of Toronto
- James Charles McGuigan, Archbishop of Toronto

== Notable alumni ==
- Fr. Robert Joseph Bedard, founder of the Companions of the Cross (Class of 1955)

== See also ==
- Higher education in Ontario
- St. John Henry Newman Catholic High School
