= Society of apostolic life =

Group of Catholic devotees who live together

A society of apostolic life is a form of consecrated life in which a group of men or women within the Catholic Church come together for a specific purpose and live fraternally. This type of organization is defined in the 1983 Code of Canon Law under Canons 731–746. Under the 1917 Code of Canon Law, which preceded the current one, this manner of life was referred to as a society of common life.

== Description ==
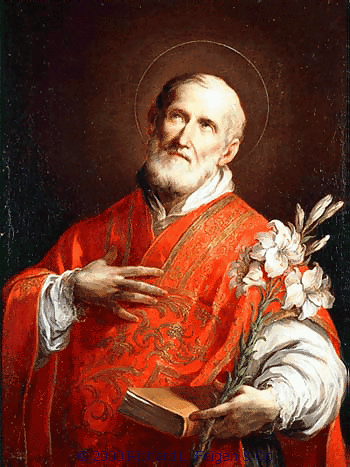
St. Philip Neri can be considered the father of societies of apostolic life.

Members of apostolic societies prioritize mission over community life. According to the Vincentian priest Robert P. Maloney, community life should be strong enough to be supportive to those who have pledged to pursue the same apostolic purpose, and flexible enough to allow members to respond to the urgent needs of those they serve. In community, apostolic societies must maintain a balance between prayer and active works.

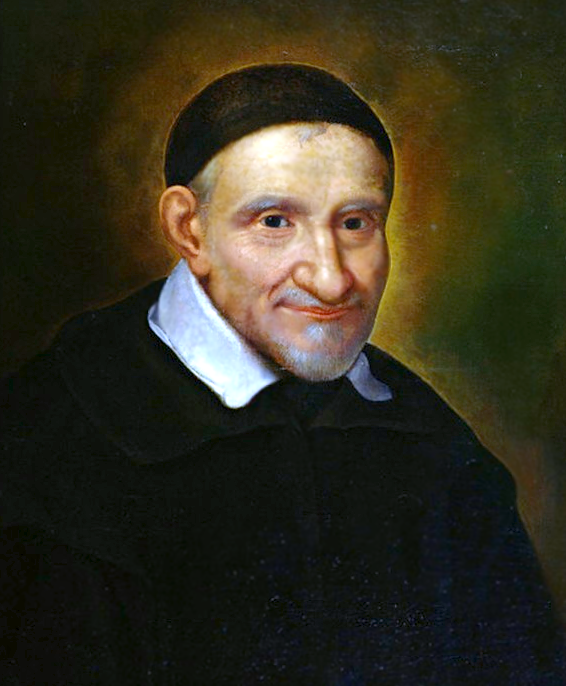
St. Vincent de Paul

Apostolic societies vary widely in their missions and areas of focus. Some emphasize preaching, teaching, healthcare, seminary formation, foreign missions, retreats, or advocacy for justice, among other goals. Most were founded in response to a specific need recognized by their founders. Today, many continue to center their work on one or more of the corporal and spiritual works of mercy.

A number of apostolic societies, such as the Daughters of Charity of Saint Vincent de Paul, profess vows or similar commitments defined in their constitutions to live out the evangelical counsels of poverty, chastity, and obedience. The Congregation of the Mission and the Daughters of Charity, both founded by St. Vincent de Paul, are part of a group of societies established in the 16th and 17th centuries in response to growing poverty in France. Vincent de Paul chose not to establish the Daughters of Charity as a religious order because at that time women religious were "enclosed" (cloistered), and that state was "not compatible with the duties of their vocation."

A community needs the written approval of a bishop to operate within his diocese. Clerics of a society of apostolic life usually are incardinated into the society and not a diocese, unless specified otherwise in its constitutions (for example, the Sulpicians, who are members of both their society and dioceses). Each community has a right to its own oratory. Members of a society of apostolic life are allowed to own personal property, but normally live in community together.

Canon 731 speaks of such societies as being "comparable to institutes of consecrated life". They are regulated by the Dicastery for Institutes of Consecrated Life and Societies of Apostolic Life.

== List ==
These lists are not exhaustive.

=== Societies of Apostolic Life of Pontifical Right ===
==== For men ====
- Catholic Foreign Mission Society of America, M.M. (Maryknoll Fathers)
- Clerical Society of the Missionaries of the Holy Apostles, M.S.A.
- Clerical Society of Virgo Flos Carmeli, E.P.
- Companions of the Cross, CC
- Confederation of Oratories of Saint Philip Neri, C.O. (Oratory of Saint Philip Neri, Oratorians)
- Congregation of Jesus and Mary, C.I.M./C.J.M. (Eudists)
- Congregation of the Mission, C.M. (Vincentians, Lazarists)
- Glenmary Home Missioners, G.H.M.
- Guadelupe Home Missioners, M.G.
- Heralds of Good News, H.G.N.
- Institute of Christ the King Sovereign Priest I.C.R.S.S./I.C.K.S.P.
- Institute of the Good Shepherd
- Missionaries of Our Lady of the Most Blessed Sacrament, S.D.N.
- Mission Society of the Philippines, M.S.P.
- Missionaries of Africa, M.Afr. (White Fathers)
- Missionaries of the Holy Cross, M.S.C.
- Missionaries of the Precious Blood, C.PP.S.
- Missionary Society of Saint Columban, S.S.C.M.E. (Columban Missionaries)
- Oratory of France, C.O.I. (Oratorians of France)
- Paris Foreign Missions Society, M.E.P.
- Paulist Fathers, C.S.P.
- Pontifical Institute for Foreign Missions, P.I.M.E.
- Portuguese Missionary Society, S.M.P. / S.M.B.N.
- Priestly Fraternity of St. Peter, F.S.S.P.
- Priestly Fraternity of the Missionaries of St. Charles Borromeo, F.S.C.B.
- Saint Francis Xavier Spanish Institute for Foreign Missions, I.E.M.E.
- Saint Joseph's Missionary Society of Mill Hill, M.H.M.
- Saint Patrick's Society for the Foreign Missions, S.P.S.
- Scarboro Foreign Mission Society, S.F.M.
- Society of African Missions, S.M.A.
- Society of Bethlehem Mission Immensee, S.M.B.
- Society of Foreign Missions: Société des Missions-Étrangères du Québec, P.M.E.
- Society of Priests of Saint James, P.S.J.
- Society of Priests of Saint Joseph Benedict Cottolengo, S.S.C.
- Society of Priests of Saint Sulpice, P.S.S., Society of Saint-Sulpice (Sulpicians)
- Society of Saint Joseph of the Sacred Heart, S.S.J. (Josephites - which has a homonym)
- Society of the Catholic Apostolate, S.A.C. (Pallottines)
- Society of the Missionaries of Saint Francis Xavier, S.F.X. (Pilar Fathers)
- Sodalitium Christianae Vitae (Sodalitium of Christian Life), S.C.V. (Suppressed)
- Vincentian Congregation, C.V.
- Workers of the Kingdom of Christ, C.O.R.C.
- Yarumal Society for the Foreign Missions, M.X.Y. / I.M.E.Y.

==== For women ====
- Consecrated Women of Regnum Christi
- Daughters of Charity of St. Vincent de Paul
- Sisters of Social Service

=== Societies of Apostolic Life of Diocesan Right ===
The diocesan bishop must consent to the "erection of a house and establishment of a local community", and must also be consulted concerning its suppression.

- Apostolic Life Community of Priests in the Opus Spiritus Sancti, A.L.C.P./O.S.S. (Holy Spirit Fathers)
- Companions of the Cross, C.C.
- Korean Missionary Society, K.M.S
- Lay Consecrated Men Regnum Christi
- Missionary Society of Saint Paul of Nigeria, M.S.P.
- Missionary Society of St. Thomas the Apostle, M.S.T.
- Oblates of Saints Ambrose and Charles, O.Ss.C.A.
- Oblates of Saints Charles and Gaudentius of Novara, O.Ss.G.C.N.
- Society of Saint John Mary Vianney, S.J.M.V.
- Society of Our Lady of the Most Holy Trinity
- Work of the Holy Spirit, O.S.S.

== See also ==
- Institutes of consecrated life
- Religious institute (Catholic)
- Vocational discernment in the Catholic Church
