= Emmanuel College, Toronto =

Federated college of the University of Toronto

Emmanuel College
- Federated college
- University of Toronto
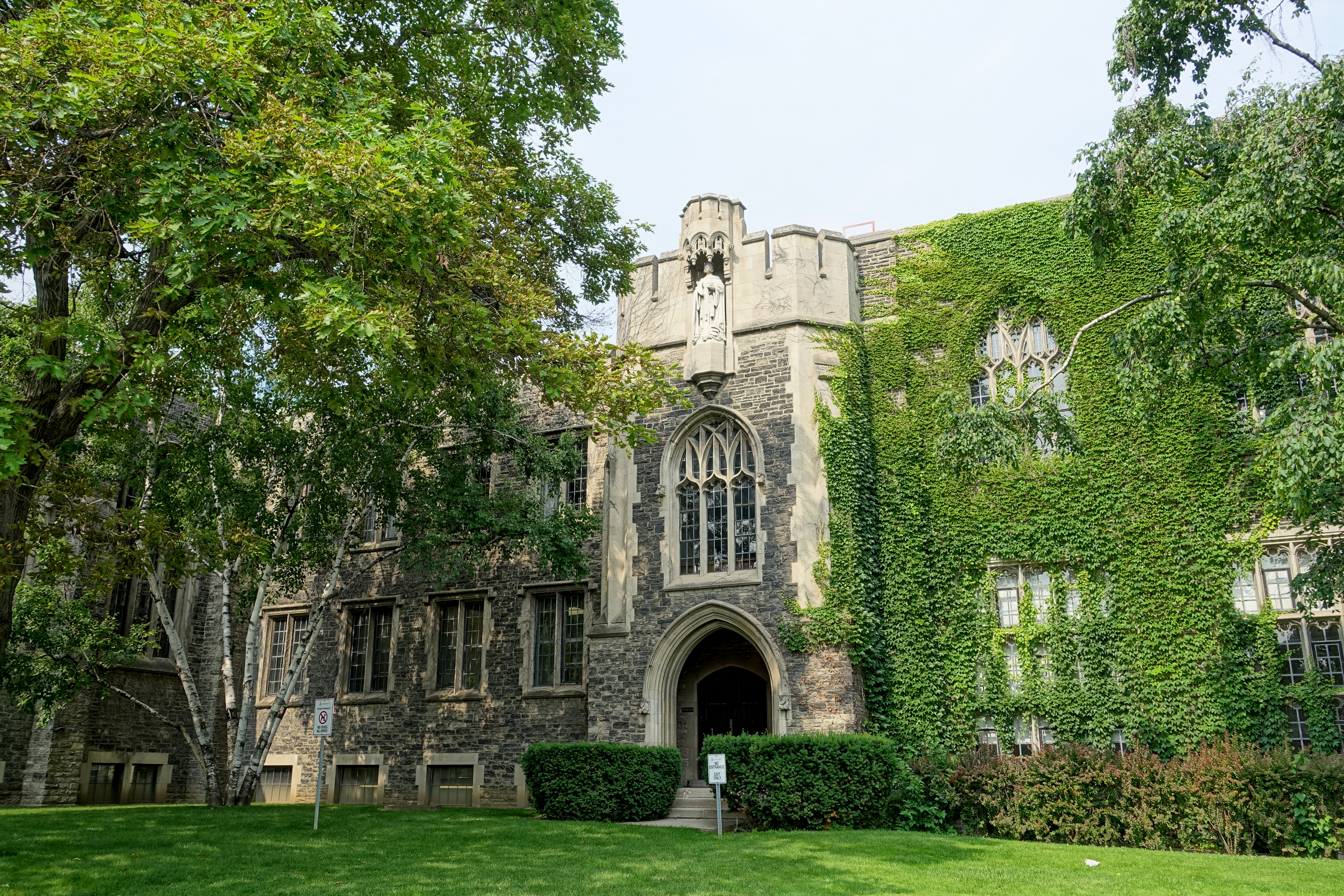

- Location: 75 Queen's Park Crescent East, Toronto, Ontario, Canada
- Coordinates: 43°40′00″N 79°23′34″W
- Established: 1836; 190 years ago as Victoria College; 1928 (merger)
- Principal: HyeRan Kim-Cragg
- Postgraduates: 173
- Affiliation: United Church of Canada, TST, ATS
- Website: emmanuel.utoronto.ca

Emmanuel College is a federated college of the University of Toronto which serves as the postgraduate theological college of Victoria University. It is located on the St. George campus in Toronto, Ontario, Canada. Affiliated with the United Church of Canada, it is also a member institution of the Toronto School of Theology. The college's principal is HyeRan Kim-Cragg.

Emmanuel College is a member of the Association of Theological Schools in the United States and Canada.

== History ==
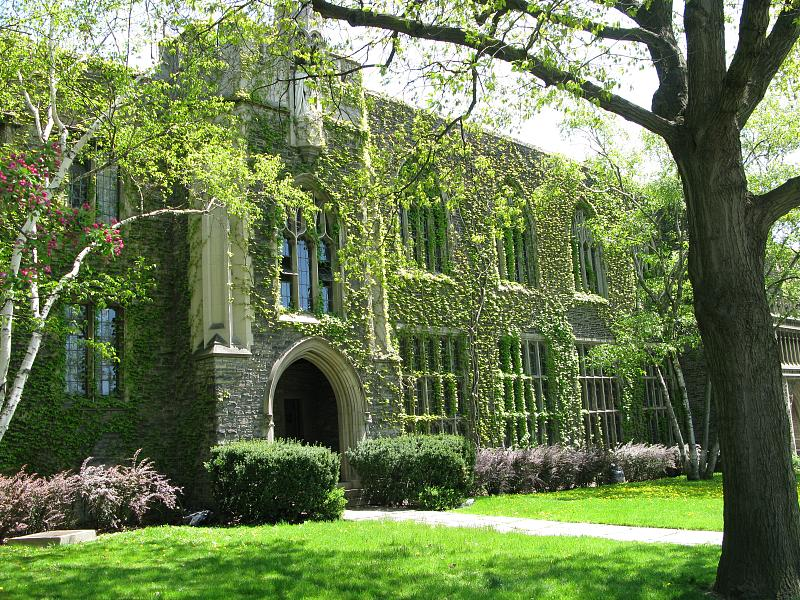
Emmanuel College

Emmanuel College has its origins in Victoria College, a Methodist college founded in 1836. From 1871 it operated a Faculty of Theology training candidates for the ministry of the Wesleyan Methodist Church. In 1884, with the merger of the Wesleyan Methodists and the Methodist Episcopal Church (MEC) into a single Methodist Church of Canada, the seminary the MEC had established at Albert University in 1857 merged into Victoria.

When the merger in turn to create the United Church of Canada took place in 1925, a number of congregations in the Presbyterian Church in Canada chose to remain a distinct denomination. Knox College in the University of Toronto, founded as the Free Church rival to Queen's University during the Disruption of 1843 and favourable to church union, was expected to serve as the new church's main seminary. However, the Legislative Assembly of Ontario awarded the building to the continuing Presbyterians. The faculty and most students of Knox left to form "Union College", which merged with the Faculty of Theology at Victoria College in 1928 to form Emmanuel College. The new college became affiliated with the University of Toronto as a United Church of Canada seminary. The Emmanuel College main building was designed by architect Henry Sproatt.

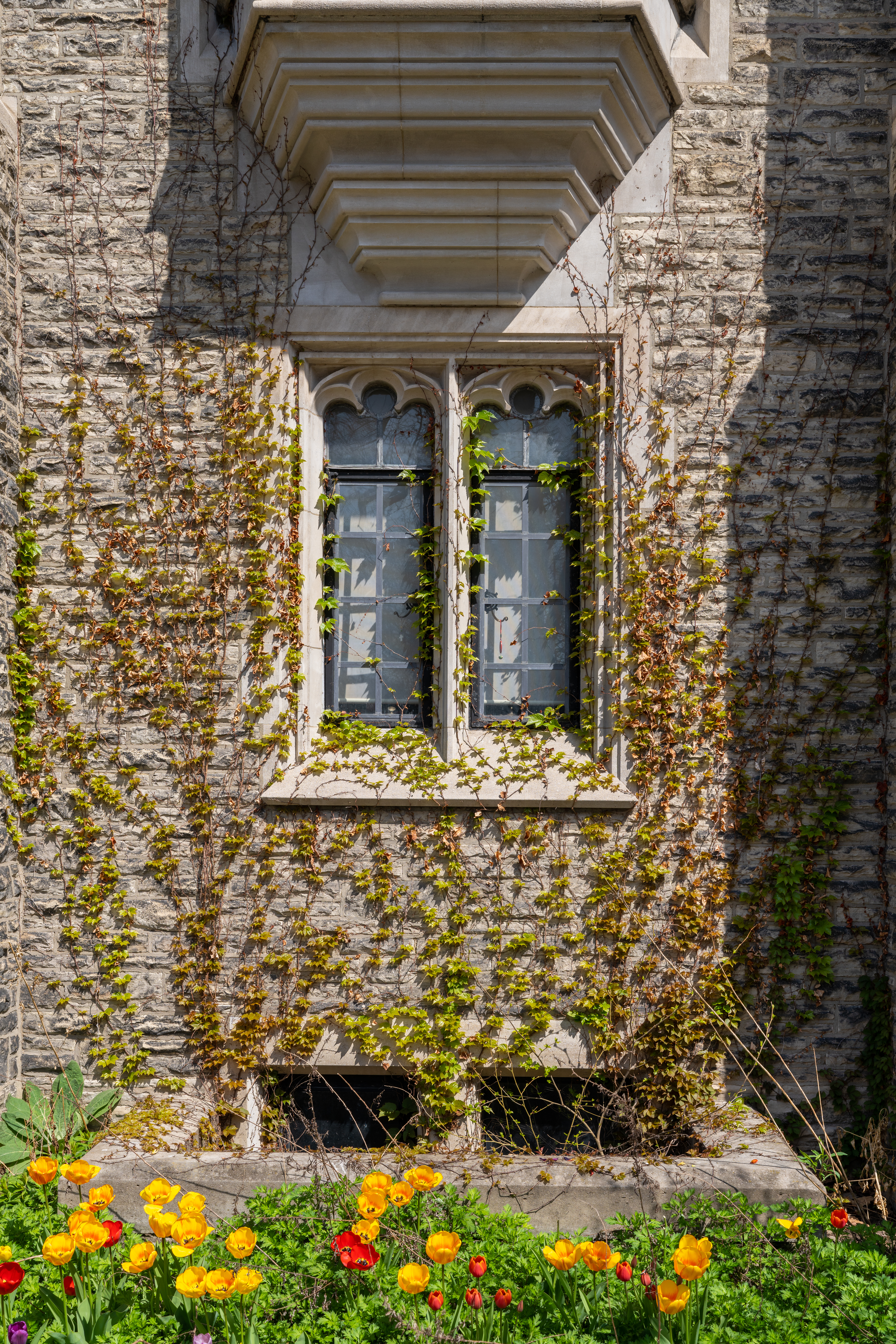
A window of Emmanuel College

In 1969 the Toronto School of Theology (TST) was created as an independent federation of 7 schools of theology, including the divinity faculties of Emmanuel College. Within its own federation, U of T granted all but theology or divinity degrees. In May 1974, along with the other federated universities, St. Michael's and Trinity, a Memorandum of Understanding was signed with the University of Toronto, establishing the terms of their new relationship with the Faculty of Arts and Science. Since 1978, by virtue of a change made in its charter, the University of Toronto has granted theology degrees conjointly with Emmanuel College and other TST's member institutions.

In 2010, Emmanuel became a multifaith seminary adding a Canadian Certificate of Muslim Studies program, which evolved into the Master of Pastoral Studies: Muslim focus.

In 2015, a Diploma in Buddhist Mindfulness and Mental Health program was added which evolved into in the Master of Pastoral Studies: Buddhist focus.

Emmanuel College welcomed its first woman principal in 2018 with the appointment of Michelle Voss Roberts. In 2022, HyeRan Kim-Cragg succeeded Voss Roberts as principal. Rev. Kim-Cragg is the first person of colour and second woman to lead the institution.

== In popular culture ==
Emmanuel College's library was the location where the British band Tears for Fears filmed the music video for their song "Head over Heels" in June 1985.

The 1990 Movie, Stanley & Iris, starring Jane Fonda and Robert De Niro was also partially filmed in the College`s Library.

Almuth Lutkenhaus' statue Crucified Woman is on the grounds of Emmanuel College
