= List of churches in the Diocese of Hamilton, Ontario =

This is a list of current and former Catholic churches in the Diocese of Hamilton, Ontario. The diocese includes 118 parishes in Southwestern Ontario divided into six administrative regions called deaneries. The cathedral church of the diocese is Cathedral Basilica of Christ the King in Hamilton, Ontario.

== Brant Deanery ==
| Name | Images | Location | Established | Description/notes |
|---|---|---|---|---|
| Our Lady of the Assumption | | Brantford | 1895 | Current church built in 1953. |
| St. Basil | | Brantford | 1840 | Current building construction began in 1866 and completed in 1875. The interior was finished in 1891. |
| St. Joseph (Polish) | | Brantford | 1938 | Church building used to be St. Andrew's Presbyterian Church. The diocese bought the church in 1938 and established St. Joseph Polish church. After renovations, the church was dedicated February 27, 1938 by Bishop Joseph Francis Ryan. |
| St. Pius X | | Brantford | 1958 | Church constructed in 1958. |
| Blessed Sacrament | | Burford | 1954 | |
| Sacred Heart | | Paris | 1857 | |
| St. Anthony Daniel | | Scotland | 1950 | |

== Bruce Grey Deanery ==
| Name | Images | Location | Established | Description/notes |
|---|---|---|---|---|
| St. Mary | | Cape Croker | 1902 | |
| St. Joseph | | Cargill | | Mission of Mary Immaculate, Chepstow |
| St. Francis Xavier | | Carlsruhe | | Mission of Holy Family, Hanover |
| St. Stanislaus | | Chatsworth | | Mission of St. Mary of the Assumption, Owen Sound, Ontario |
| Mary Immaculate | | Chepstow | 1874 | Church designed by Arthur W. Holmes, completed in 1903. |
| St. Ann | | Chesley | | Mission of Holy Family, Hanover |
| St. Paul | | Dornoch | | Mission of St. Peter, Durham. Church designed by Joseph Connolly, construction completed in 1890. |
| St. John the Evangelist | | Dundalk | 1894 | |
| St. Peter | | Durham | 1921 | |
| Immaculate Conception | | Formosa | 1861 | Church designed by Joseph Connolly, construction completed in 1883. |
| St. John | | Glenelg | | Mission of St. Peter, Durham |
| Holy Family | | Hanover | 1921 | |
| St. Mary of the Rosary | | Hepworth | | Mission of St. Mary of the Assumption, Owen Sound, Ontario |
| St. Anthony | | Kincardine | 1940 | |
| St. Mark | | Lion’s Head | | Mission of St. Mary of the Assumption, Owen Sound, Ontario |
| St. Joseph | | Markdale | | Mission of St. Peter, Durham |
| St. Vincent | | Meaford | | Mission of St. Mary of the Assumption, Owen Sound, Ontario |
| Sacred Heart | | Mildmay | 1895 | Church designed by Arthur W. Holmes, construction completed in 1911. |
| St. Mary | | Owen Sound | 1854 | |
| St. Joseph | | Port Elgin | 1962 | |
| Holy Family | | Sauble Beach | | Mission of St. Mary of the Assumption, Owen Sound, Ontario |
| Shelburne Mission | | Shelburne | | Mission of St. John the Evangelist, Dundalk, Ontario. Worships at Trinity United Church in Shelburne. |
| St. Patrick | | South Proton | | Mission of St. John the Evangelist, Dundalk, Ontario. |
| St. Patrick | | Southampton | | Mission of St. Joseph, Port Elgin |
| Sacred Heart | | Teeswater | | Mission of Immaculate Conception, Formosa |
| St. Thomas the Apostle | | Tobermory | | Mission of St. Mary of the Assumption, Owen Sound, Ontario |
| Sacred Heart | | Walkerton | 1872 | |
| St. Thomas Aquinas | | Wiarton | | Mission of St. Mary of the Assumption, Owen Sound, Ontario |

== Halton Deanery ==
| Name | Images | Location | Established | Description/notes |
|---|---|---|---|---|
| St. Joseph Patron of Canada | | Acton | 1858 | |
| Holy Rosary | | Burlington | 1947 | |
| St. Gabriel | | Burlington | 1962 | |
| St. John the Baptist | | Burlington | 1849 | |
| St. Patrick | | Burlington | 1969 | |
| St. Paul the Apostle | | Burlington | 1985 | |
| Saint-Philippe (French) | | Burlington | 1968 | |
| St. Raphael | | Burlington | 1958 | |
| Holy Cross | | Georgetown | 1956 | |
| Sacré-Coeur (French) | | Georgetown | 1966 | Designed by Joseph Connolly and was built in 1885. Formerly Holy Cross Church until 1965, it was rededicated to L'Église Sacré-Coeur to serve the French community. |
| Holy Rosary | | Milton | 1936 | |
| St. Benedict | | Milton | 2012 | Parish was established in 2012 with then Fr. Daniel Miehm as founding pastor. The church was designed to with a capacity of 900 and also to be carbon-neutral with the potential of being carbon-positive. The church was dedicated by Bishop Douglas Crosby on November 28, 2021. |
| Queen of Peace (Croatian) | | Norval | | |
| Holy Trinity (Croatian) | | Oakville | 1976 | The church was dedicated by Bishop Juraj Jezerinac on November 17, 1991. Jezerinac served as pastor of Holy Trinity from 1988 to his appointment of auxiliary bishop of the Archdiocese of Zagreb. |
| Mary Mother of God | | Oakville | 1996 | |
| St. Andrew | | Oakville | 1845 | |
| St. Anthony (Polish) | | Oakville | | |
| St. Dominic | | Oakville | 1955 | Church dedicated by Bishop Joseph Ryan on February 26, 1962. |
| St. James | | Oakville | 1961 | Church dedicated by Bishop Joseph Ryan on April 12, 1964. It was the first church in Canada to have the altar face the congreation. |
| St. Joseph (Portuguese) | | Oakville | | |
| St. Matthew | | Oakville | 1988 | Church dedicated June 23, 1993 by Bishop Anthony Tonnos. |
| St. Michael | | Oakville | 1975 | |

== Hamilton Deanery ==
| Name | Images | Location | Established | Description/notes |
|---|---|---|---|---|
| St. Ann | | Ancaster | 1951 | The church was designed in a Spanish mission style, similar to St. Peter's Church in New Westminster, British Columbia. It was completed in 1958. |
| St. Augustine | | Dundas | 1826 | |
| Our Lady of Mount Carmel | | Freelton | 1877 | |
| Cathedral Basilica of Christ the King | | Hamilton | 1933 | |
| All Souls | | Hamilton | 1922 | |
| Annunciation of Our Lord | | Hamilton | 1978 | Church dedicated by Bishop Paul Reding on May 10, 1981. |
| Canadian Martyrs | | Hamilton | 1955 | |
| Holy Cross (Croatian) | | Hamilton | 1958 | |
| Incarnation of Our Blessed Lord | | Hamilton | 1973 | |
| Most Blessed Sacrament | | Hamilton | 1955 | |
| Notre Dame du Perpetuel Secours (French) | | Hamilton | 1951 | |
| Our Lady of Mercy (Lithuanian) | | Hamilton | 1948 | |
| Our Lady of Vietnam (Vietnamese) | | Hamilton | 1998 | |
| Regina Mundi | | Hamilton | 1959 | |
| Sacred Heart | | Hamilton | 1921 | |
| St. Ann | | Hamilton | 1906 | |
| St. Anthony of Padua (Italian) | | Hamilton | 1912 | |
| St. Catherine of Siena | | Hamilton | 2017 | Parish established in 2017 as a merger between Corpus Christi and Our Lady of Lourdes Parishes. The church building was dedicated in October 2023. |
| St. Charles Garnier | | Hamilton | 1961 | |
| St. Eugene | | Hamilton | 1950 | |
| St. Gregory the Great (Slovenian) | | Hamilton | 1965 | |
| St. John the Baptist | | Hamilton | 1930 | |
| St. Joseph | | Hamilton | 1894 | |
| St. Lawrence | | Hamilton | 1890 | |
| St. Luke | | Hamilton | 1975 | |
| St. Margaret Mary | | Hamilton | 1966 | |
| St. Mary - Paroquia de Santa Maria (Portuguese) | | Hamilton | 1836 | |
| St. Patrick | | Hamilton | 1877 | |
| St. Peter Yu | | Hamilton | 1994 | |
| St. Stanislaus (Polish) | | Hamilton | 1912 | |
| St. Stephen of Hungary | | Hamilton | 1944 | |
| Sts. Peter and Paul | | Hamilton | 1944 | |
| Immaculate Heart | | Stoney Creek | 1952 | |
| Our Lady of the Assumption | | Stoney Creek | 1951 | |
| St. Francis Xavier | | Stoney Creek | 1947 | |
| St. Thomas | | Waterdown | 1950 | The current church was dedicated by Bishop Anthony Tonnos in 2005 and replaces the original church built in 1914. The current church seats 1,000. |

== Waterloo Deanery ==
| Name | Images | Location | Established | Description/notes |
|---|---|---|---|---|
| St. Brigid | | Ayr | | Mission of Blessed Sacrament, Kitchener |
| Our Lady of Fatima (Portuguese) | | Cambridge | 1964 | |
| Saints-Martyrs-Canadiens (French) /Church of the Canadian Martyr Saints | | Cambridge | 1976 | |
| St. Ambrose | | Cambridge | 1955 | Parish established to the small size of St. Patrick's Church.The church building was dedicated June 3, 1956. |
| St. Clement | | Cambridge | 1905 | Church designed by Arthur W. Holmes, construction completed in 1911. |
| St. Gregory | | Cambridge | 1967 | |
| St. Mary of the Visitation | | Cambridge | 1857 | Current church was a former Presbyterian Church, purchased in 1916, after the existing church burnt down. |
| St. Patrick | | Cambridge | 1877 | |
| St. Teresa of Avila | | Elmira | 1888 | Current church opened in June 1992 with a capacity of 500. Timothy Schmalz carved the statues and stations of the cross in the church. |
| Blessed Sacrament | | Kitchener | 1977 | Church designed by Snyder, Reichard and March. The church dedicated by Bishop Paul Reding on the feast of Corpus Christi, June 21, 1981. |
| Holy Family (Croatian) | | Kitchener | 1978 | Church designed by Horton and Ball, Walter, Fedy, McCargar, Hachborn and opened in 1980. |
| Our Lady of Fatima (Portuguese) | | Kitchener | 1988 | Church designed by Jenkins-Wright and built in 1956 as an Anglican Church and closed in 1987. The church was bought by the Diocese in 1988. |
| Our Lady of Guadalupe (Spanish) | | Kitchener | 2009 | Worships at St. John's Church in Kitchener. |
| Sacred Heart (Polish) | | Kitchener | 1912 | Church designed by Arthur W. Holmes, construction completed in 1918. |
| St. Aloysius | | Kitchener | 1953 | |
| St. Anne | | Kitchener | 1948 | Church designed by Barrett-Reider. The cornerstone was laid June 1950, the first Mass celebrated on Christmas Eve, 1950, and dedicated by Bishop Joseph Ryan on April 22, 1951. |
| St. Anthony Daniel | | Kitchener | 1966 | Parish established in 1966. The church's groundbreaking was on October 27, 1968, and the church was dedicated by Bishop Joseph Ryan on September 7, 1969. The parish was originally called St. Daniel but was renamed to St. Anthony Daniel. |
| St. Francis of Assisi | | Kitchener | 1959 | |
| St. John | | Kitchener | 1937 | The church was designed by B.A. Jones, and the cornerstone of the church was laid on August 15, 1937, and the church was dedicated by Bishop Joseph Ryan n February 20, 1938 although it was unfinished. |
| St. Mark | | Kitchener | 1988 | |
| St. Mary Our Lady of the Seven Sorrows | | Kitchener | 1857 | Church designed by Arthur W. Holmes, construction completed in 1903. |
| St. Paul Chung (Korean) | | Kitchener | 2009 | Worships at St. Anthony Daniel Church in Kitchener. |
| St. Teresa | | Kitchener | 1955 | Church designed by Barrett-Reider and opened in 1957. |
| St. Mary Queen of Heaven | | Linwood | | Mission of St. Clement, St. Clements. |
| St. Joseph | | Macton | | Mission of St. Clement, St. Clements. Church designed by Joseph Connolly, construction completed in 1879. |
| St. Boniface | | Maryhill | 1847 | |
| Holy Family | | New Hamburg | 1859 | |
| St. Agatha | | St. Agatha | 1834 | Church designed by Arthur W. Holmes, construction completed between 1898-1900. |
| St. Clement | | St. Clements | 1847 | Construction completed in 1858. |
| Our Lady of Lourdes | | Waterloo | 1952 | Church designed by Frank Brucher and opened in 1956. |
| St. Agnes | | Waterloo | 1967 | Construction completed in 1969. |
| St. Louis | | Waterloo | 1890 | The cornerstone was laid the 3rd Sunday of June in 1890. The church was dedicated by Bishop Thomas Dowling on January 6th, 1891. In 1915, the church was expanded to a capacity of 700. |
| St. Michael | | Waterloo | 1962 | |

== Wellington Deanery ==
| Name | Images | Location | Established | Description/notes |
|---|---|---|---|---|
| St. John the Evangelist | | Arthur | 1857 | Church designed by Joseph Connolly, construction completed in 1874. |
| St. Peter | | Ayton | | Mission of St. Mary of the Purification, Mount Forest. Church designed by Joseph Connolly, construction completed in 1874. |
| St. Martin of Tours | | Drayton | 1894 | |
| St. Mary Immaculate | | Elora | 1870 | |
| St. John de Brebeuf | | Erin | 1959 | |
| St. Joseph | | Fergus | 1978 | The church building was dedicated on September 11, 2011 by Bishop Douglas Crosby and seats 515 people. |
| Holy Rosary | | Guelph | 1956 | |
| Basilica of Our Lady Immaculate | | Guelph | 1827 | Basilica designed by Joseph Connolly, construction completed in 1888. |
| Sacred Heart | | Guelph | 1930 | |
| St. John the Baptist | | Guelph | 1966 | |
| St. Joseph | | Guelph | 1952 | |
| St. Thomas | | Harriston | | Mission of St. Mary of the Purification, Mount Forest |
| Sacred Heart | | Kenilworth | | Mission of St. John the Evangelist, Arthur |
| St. Mary of the Purification | | Mount Forest | 1856 | The first Roman Catholic church was a simple log church constructed in 1858, but it burnt to the ground the day before its consecration. The current Roman Catholic church, Saint Mary's, was constructed in 1864. Its first priest was Father P.S. Mahuet, and it was consecrated by the Bishop of Hamilton, the Most Reverend Doctor Farrell. The rectory was built in 1880 and was converted into a convent housing the Sisters of Saint Joseph, though it was demolished in 2002 to create enough space for their new parish facilities. |
| St. Peter | | Oustic | | Mission of St. John de Brebeuf Parish, Erin, Ontario. |
| St. Mary | | Palmerston | | Mission of St. John the Evangelist, Arthur. |
| Sacred Heart | | Rockwood | 1936 | |

== Former Churches ==
| Name | Images | Location | Description/notes |
|---|---|---|---|
| St. Teresa | | Elmira | The church replaced a church in North Woolwich, and was built in 1889. It was replaced by the current church in 1992. |
| Corpus Christi | | Hamilton | Parish established in 1962, merged with Our Lady of Lourdes Parish in 2017 to create St. Catherine of Siena Parish. The church building was closed in October 2023. |
| Our Lady of Lourdes | | Hamilton | Parish established in 1958, merged with Our Lady of Lourdes Parish in 2017 to create St. Catherine of Siena Parish. The church building was closed in October 2023. |
| St. Joseph | | Kitchener | The parish was established in 1930, and worshiped in a basement church until 1953, when the upper church was completed. The parish was suppressed on June 25, 2025 due to declining attendance, financial support along with costly capital expenditures. |
| St. Patrick | | Melancthon | Former mission church of St. John the Evangelist, Dundalk, Ontario. Church closed in 2017 due to low attendance and costly repairs. |
