= Holy Rosary Church (Guelph) =

Catholic church in Ontario, Canada

Coordinates: 43.564697°N 80.253038°W

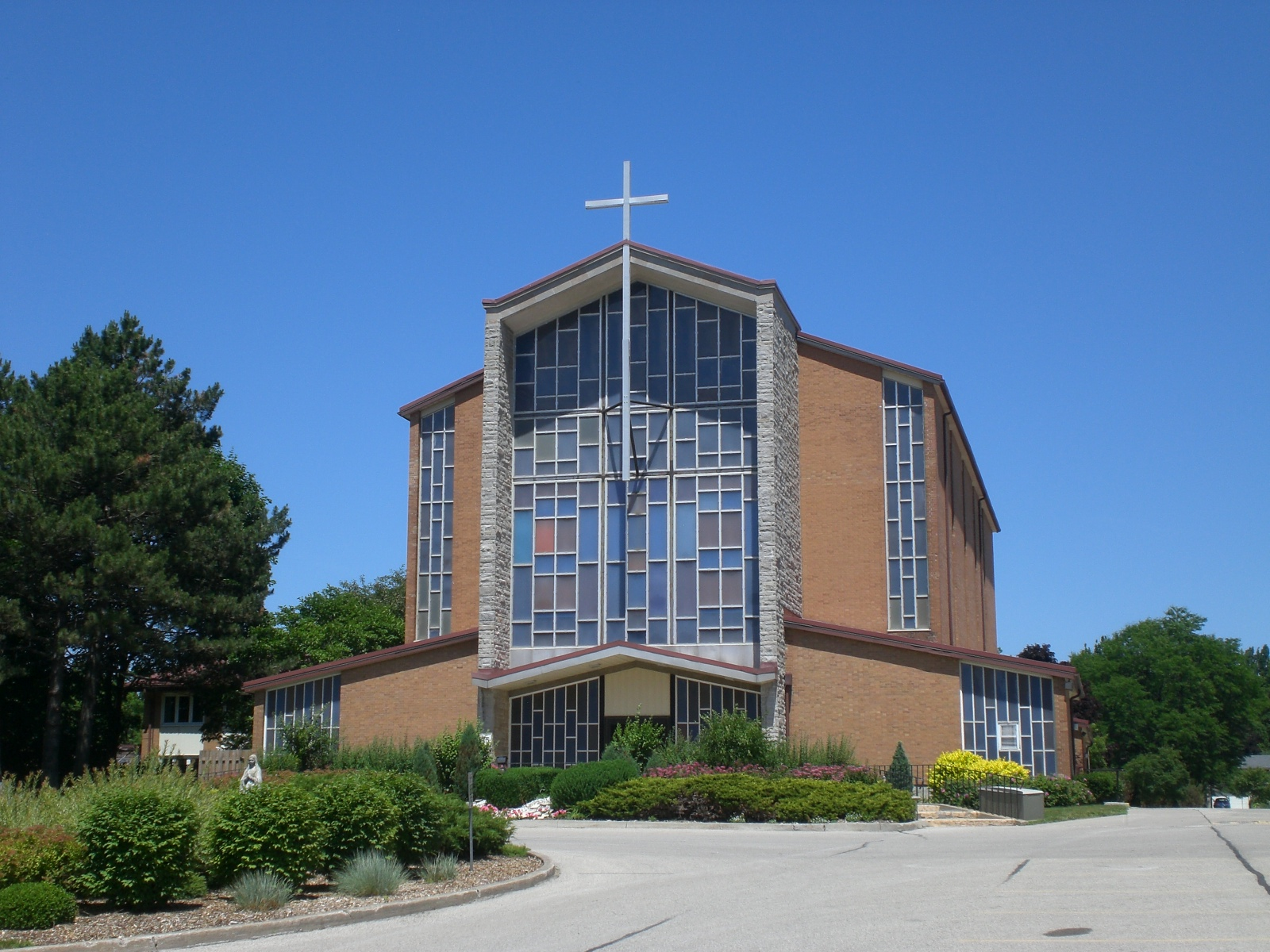
- Front entrance

- Location in Southern Ontario
- Location: 175 Emma Street; Guelph, Ontario; N1E 1V6
- Country: Canada
- Denomination: Catholic Church
- Website: HolyRosaryGuelph.ca

History
- Status: Active
- Founder: Fr J. A. O'Reilly
- Dedication: Holy Rosary

Architecture
- Functional status: Parish church
- Completed: 1956

Administration
- Province: Toronto
- Diocese: Hamilton
- Deanery: Wellington

Holy Rosary Church is a Catholic Church parish church in Guelph, Ontario, Canada. It was originally part of the parish of Church of Our Lady Immaculate, Guelph. It was founded in 1956. Since 2001, it has been administered by the Society of Jesus.

== History ==
In January 1852, the Jesuits took charge of the parish at Guelph when the Bishop of Toronto, Armand-François-Marie de Charbonnel appointed Fr John Holzer SJ, to be pastor there. The Jesuits set up a large mission area which included the counties of Wellington, Bruce and Grey County as well as Dublin and Georgetown. For the next eighty years the Jesuits would serve the main church there, which was originally St Patrick's Church, and in 1887 became the Our Lady Immaculate Church.

From Guelph, the Jesuit founded Holy Cross Church in Georgetown. In July 1885, the Bishop of Hamilton, James Joseph Carbery laid the foundation stone for the church which was designed by Joseph Connolly, who also designed the Church of Our Lady Immaculate, Guelph and St. Peter's Cathedral Basilica, London. In 1893, St Joseph Church in Acton was founded by diocesan priests. Over the course of the following decades, the Jesuits handed over various parishes, such as Holy Cross, Georgetown and St. Peter’s Church in Oustic to the priests of St Joseph's to administer.

In 1931, the Jesuits left their parishes in the Guelph area. When they left, Fr J. A. O'Reilly became the parish priest, it was during his time there, from 1931 to 1956, two parishes split off from Church of Our Lady Immaculate, Guelph, St Joseph parish in west Guelph in 1952 and Holy Rosary Church in north Guelph in 1956. In 2001, the Jesuits were asked by the Bishop of Hamilton, Anthony F. Tonnos, to run the Holy Rosary Church and they continue to serve the parish.

== Parish ==
=== Mass ===
The parish has three Sunday Masses, they are at 5:00pm on Saturday evening, and at 9:00am and 11:00am on Sunday morning. There are also weekday Masses at 9:00am from Monday to Friday all year round and at 7:00pm Thursdays from September to June.

=== Ignatius Jesuit Centre ===
In 1913, while the Jesuits were serving the churches in Guelph, they built a novitiate in north Guelph. It was for the training of future Jesuits. It was called the St Stanislaus Novitiate. In 1958, it was renamed as Ignatius College and taught the Classics to Jesuit students. In 1967, studies finished there and in 1998, it was converted into the Orchard Park Office Centre. Also with the centre is the Ignatius farm where beekeeping and ecological farming is carried out and is offered to visitors.

== Interior ==
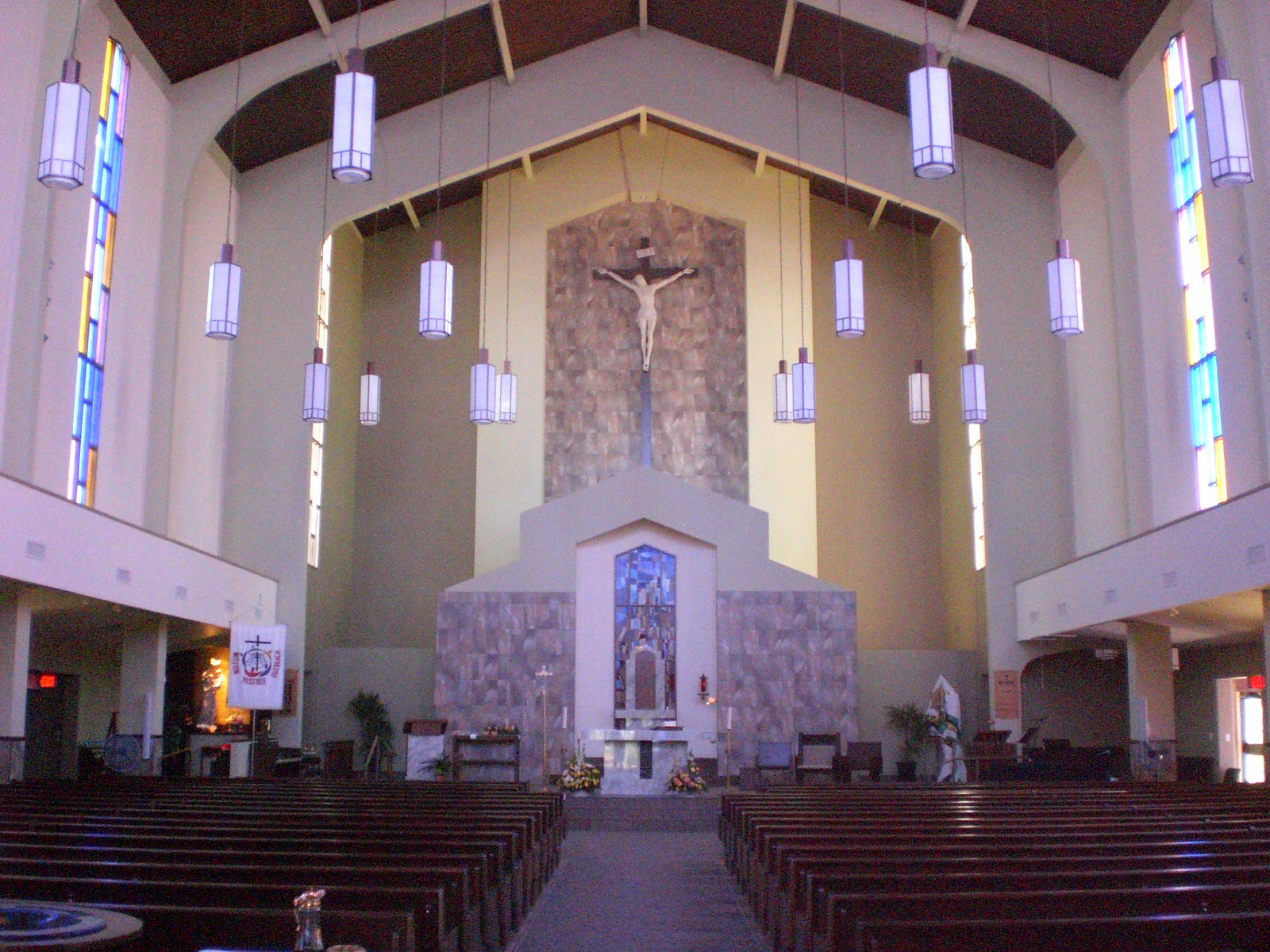
Interior

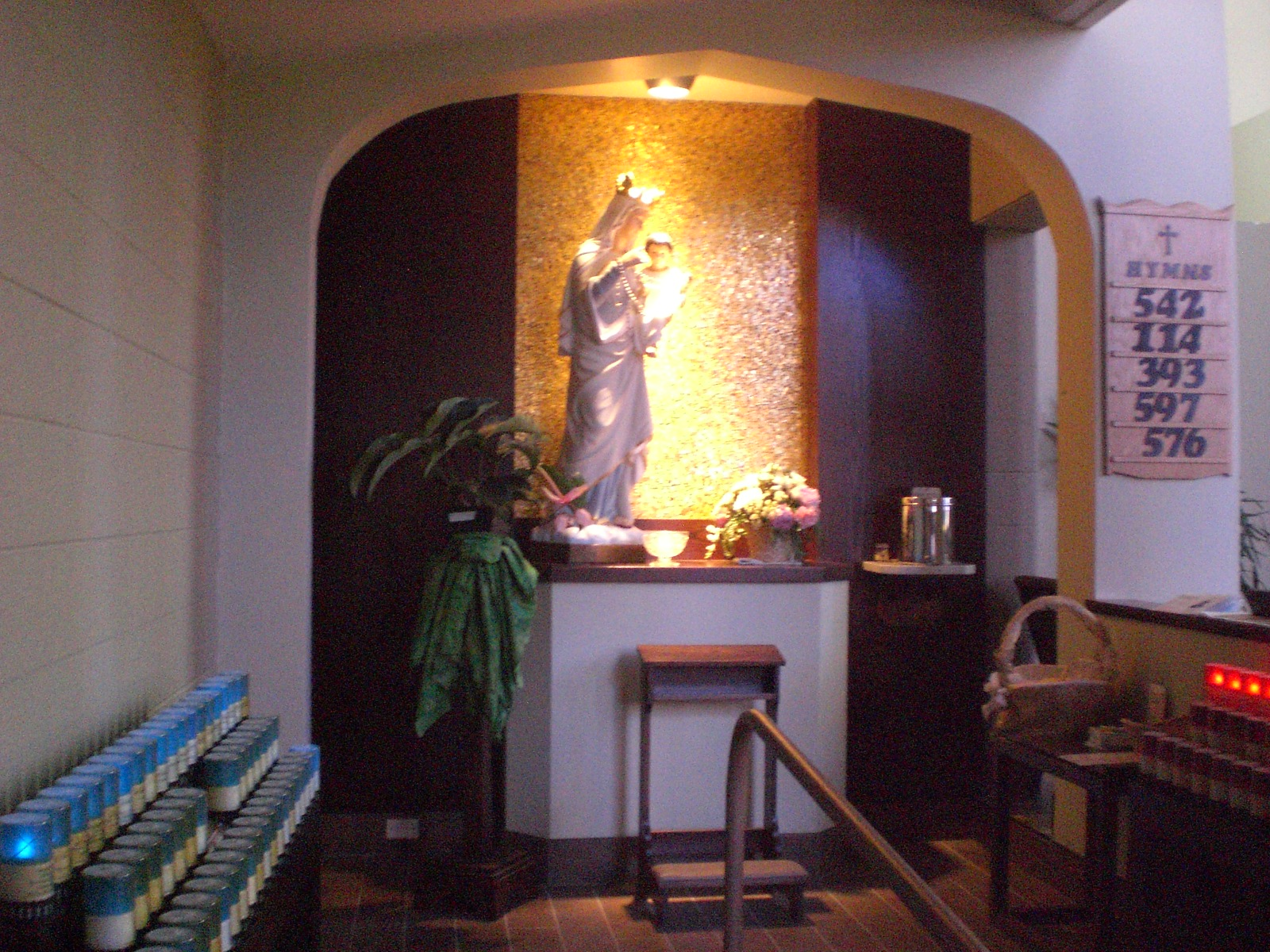
Lady chapel

== See also ==
- Basilica of Our Lady Immaculate, Guelph
- List of churches in the Roman Catholic Diocese of Hamilton, Ontario
- List of Jesuit sites
- Loyola House, Guelph
