= St. Paul's Basilica =

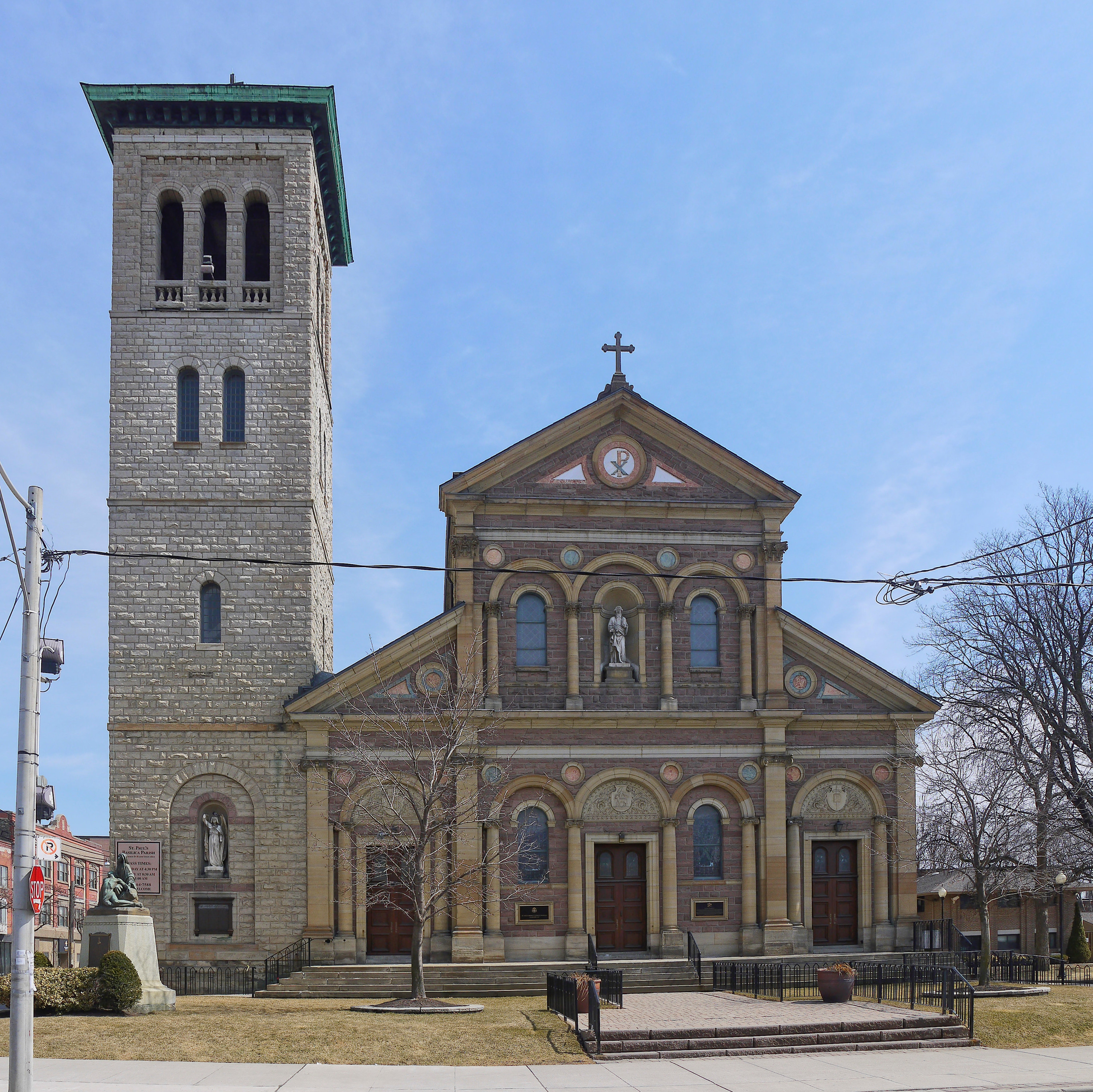
- St. Paul's Basilica
- 43°39′20″N 79°21′46″W
- Location: 83 Power Street; Toronto, Ontario, Canada
- Denomination: Roman Catholic
- Website: stpaulsbasilica.org

History
- Status: Minor basilica (since 1999)
- Founded: 1822
- Dedication: Paul the Apostle

Architecture
- Architect: Joseph Connolly
- Style: Romanesque Revival
- Groundbreaking: 1887
- Completed: 1889

Administration
- Archdiocese: Toronto
- Parish: St. Paul's

Clergy
- Archbishop: Francis Leo
- Pastor: Father Robert E. O'Brien

St. Paul's Basilica is the oldest Roman Catholic congregation in Toronto, Ontario, Canada. It is located at 83 Power Street in the Corktown neighbourhood, just east of downtown, near the intersection of Queen and Parliament streets.

== History ==
The parish was established in 1822 by James Baby, when the Town of York was part of the Diocese of Kingston, and it was the only Roman Catholic parish between Kingston and Windsor. The original church building was completed on the current site in 1824. It was constructed of red brick in the Gothic Revival style.

To serve the expanding Irish immigrant community, a school opened soon after the church. When the Diocese of Toronto was separated from the Diocese of Kingston in 1842, St. Paul's served as the pro-cathedral until St. Michael's Cathedral was completed in 1848.

The church is housed in a Romanesque Revival structure that was designed by Joseph Connolly and opened in 1889. It is based on the design of the Basilica of Saint Paul Outside the Walls in Rome. The new building was necessary to house the growing congregation.

Inside this church, located in the north transept, a stained-glass window depicts St. Paul holding a sword – with dedication to William Joseph O'Connor, a professional oarsman who grew up in the neighbourhood where the church is located. The Italianate campanile (bell tower) was built in 1905 and contains the bell from the original church.

The first Catholic cemetery in Toronto opened east of the church in 1822. The large increase in the Catholic population caused by Irish immigration quickly filled the cemetery to capacity, and it was replaced by St. Michael's Cemetery in 1857. The site of the old cemetery is now the parking lot and playground area for St. Paul's Catholic School.

The church was designated a minor basilica by Pope John Paul II in 1999.

== Plaque ==
ST. PAUL'S BASILICA
Plaque erected at the front of the church
In 1822 St. Paul's was established as the first Roman Catholic Parish between Kingston and Windsor. The first church built of red brick, was opened on this site in 1824. The land to the east of the church was used as Toronto's first Catholic Cemetery.
On December 22, 1889, the present Italian Renaissance style church was dedicated. It was designed by architect Joseph Connelly, under the inspiration of the then Pastor, Bishop Timothy O'Mahoney. The beauty of the church enhances its importance as the mother church of the Toronto Archdiocese.
On August 3, 1999, Pope John Paul II elevated St. Paul's to Basilica status.

== Gallery ==
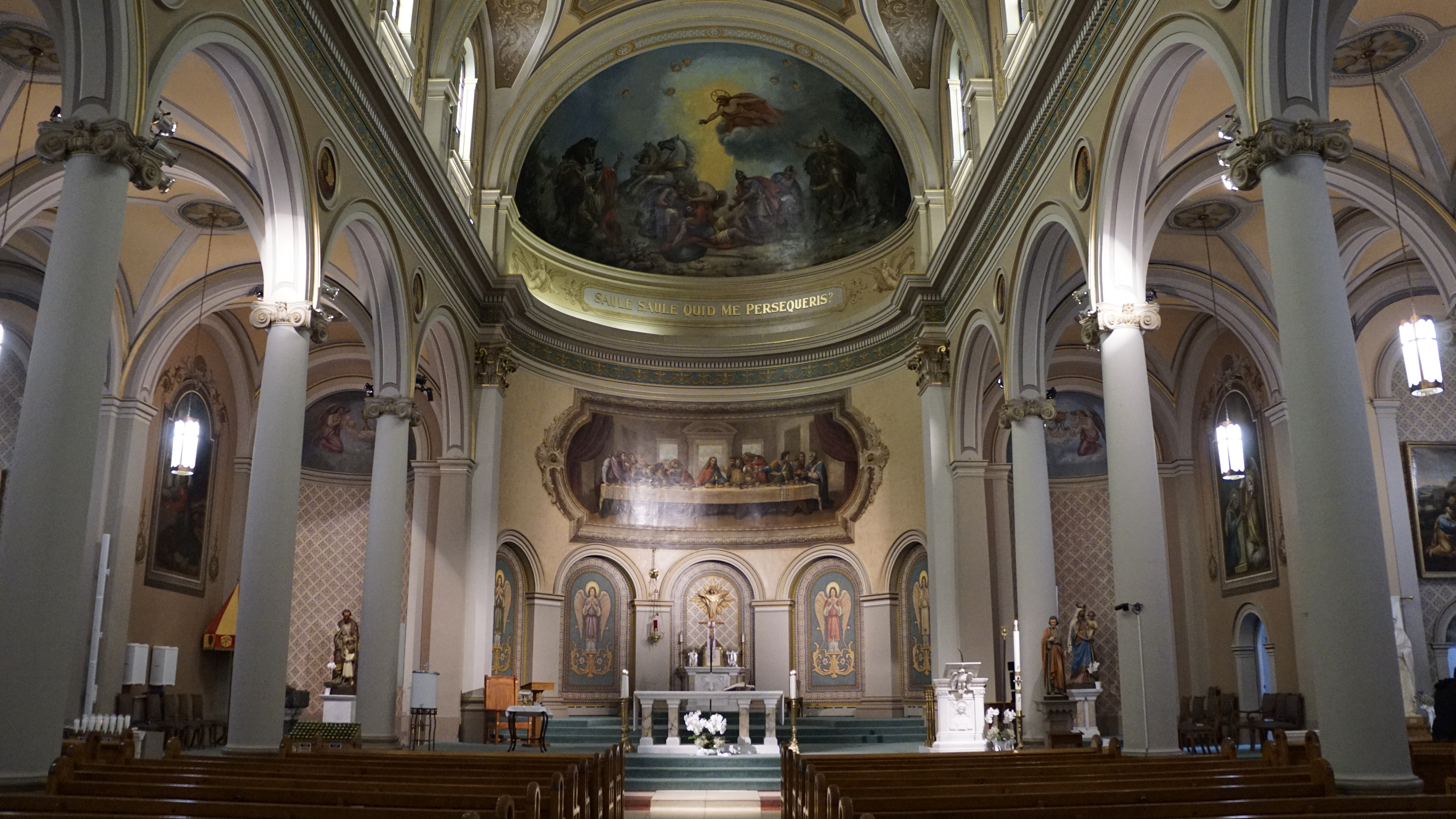
Interior of St. Paul's Basilica

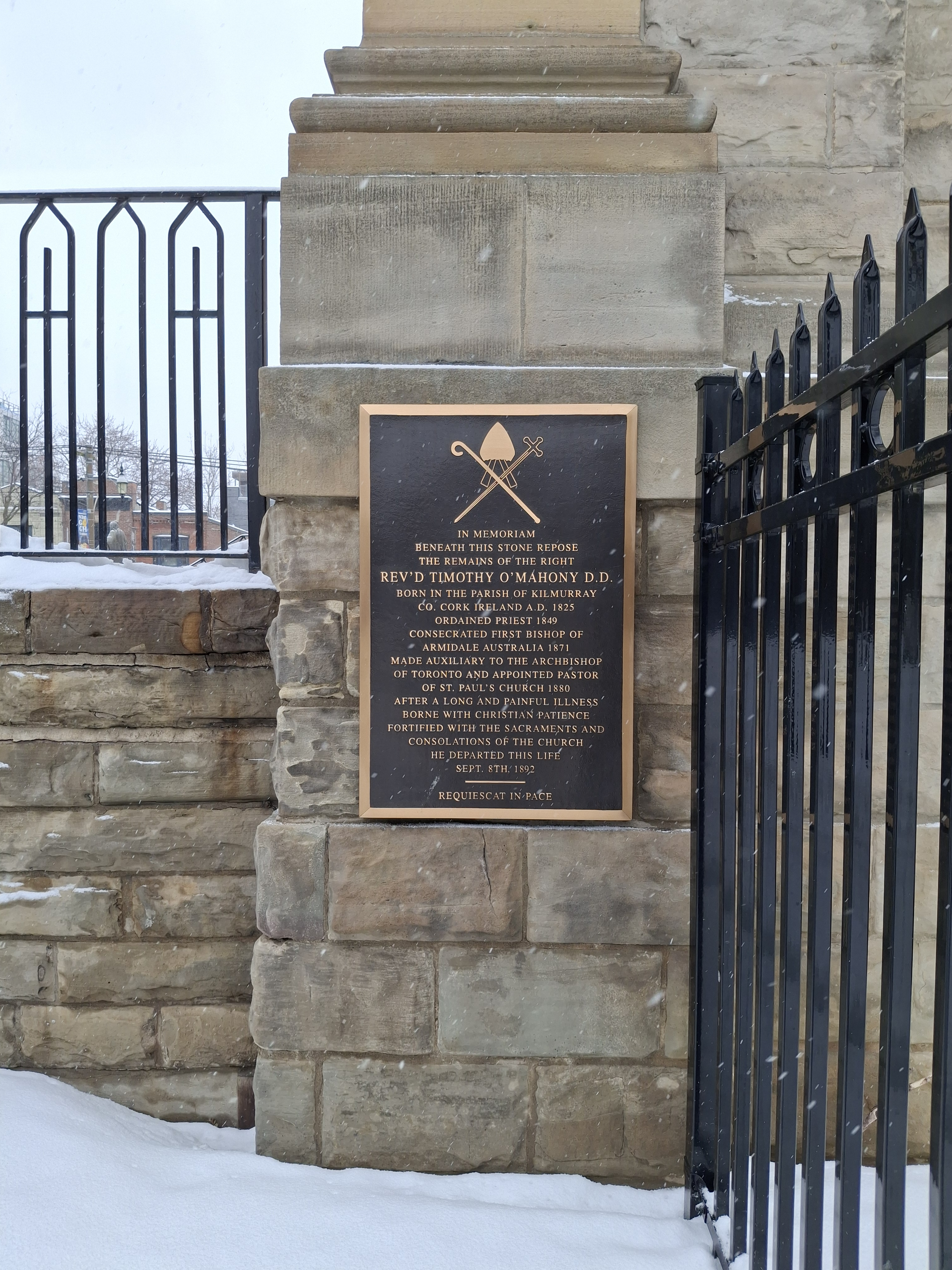
Tomb of Bishop Timothy O’Mahony next to the Basilica's entrance

== See also ==
- List of Roman Catholic churches in Toronto
- William Joseph O'Connor
