= Rémi Gaulin =

Catholic bishop

- Bishop of Kingston
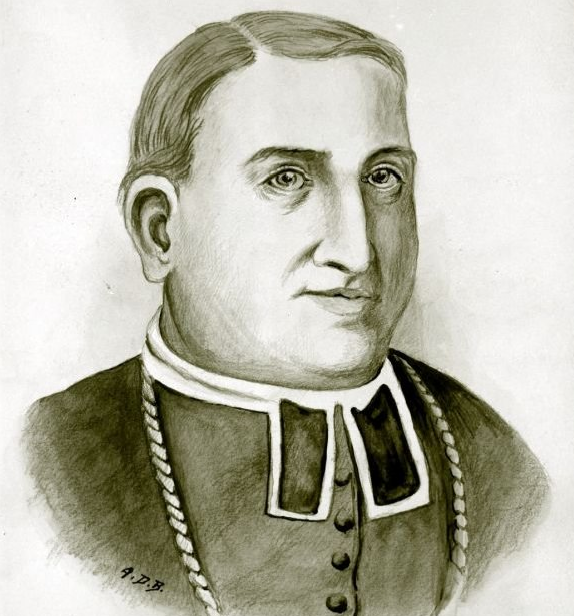
- Diocese: Kingston
- Installed: 14 January 1840
- Term ended: 8 May 1857
- Predecessor: Alexander MacDonell
- Successor: Patrick Phelan
- Other post: Coadjutor Bishop of Kingston (1833-1840)

Personal details
- Born: 30 June 1787 Quebec City
- Died: 8 May 1857 (aged 69) Sainte-Philomène (Mercier), Lower Canada

Rémi Gaulin (30 June 1787 – 8 May 1857) was a Roman Catholic priest and bishop who spent time in the service of Bishop Joseph-Octave Plessis. Plessis ordained Gaulin in 1811 and appointed him curate to Alexander MacDonell in Upper Canada. In 1815 he became a missioner in Nova Scotia. In 1840 he succeeded Macdonnell as bishop of the Diocese of Kingston.

== Life ==
Rémi Gaulin was born 30 June 1787 in Quebec to François and Françoise Amiot Gaulin. His father was a cooper. Rémi Gaulin was the great-grandnephew of Antoine Gaulin, missionary to the Abenakis and Miꞌkmaq of Acadia and Nova Scotia. Rémi studied at the Séminaire de Québec and then at the Séminaire de Nicolet. In the summer of 1811, he accompanied Bishop Joseph-Octave Plessis, as secretary, on a pastoral visit to the Îles de la Madeleine and New Brunswick; and was ordained the following October.

Father Gaulin was assigned to assist Bishop Alexander Macdonell as a curate in Glengarry County in Upper Canada. Gaulin was tri-lingual, speaking English, French, and Gaelic. Macdonnell had been chaplain for many of his parishioners, who were former soldiers who had emigrated from Scotland. During the War of 1812, he formed them into the Glengarry Light Infantry Fencibles to defend Upper Canada. Gaulin saw service as a chaplain. He was put in charge of the parishes of St. Raphael and St. Andrews. In May 1815, Gaulin returned to Quebec in order to accompany Bishop Plessis on a pastoral visit to the missions on the Gulf of St Lawrence.

In July, Plessis assigned Gaulin to be the first resident pastor of St. Ninian's parish in Antigonish, Nova Scotia, with responsibility for Margaree and Chéticamp, Cape Breton. He subsequently transferred his base to Chéticamp and by October 1816 was serving the Acadians of that community and of Margaree, and the Scots living in the Bras d'Or Lake district. In July 1819 he took charge of the Arichat, Nova Scotia mission.

The diocese of Kingston was largely Scots and Irish. Macdonnell sought a coadjutor who was neither. Three potential candidates declined before Bishop Jean-Jacques Lartigue of Montreal suggested Gaulin. In 1833, Gaulin was consecrated as a bishop and made coadjutor to Macdonell with the right of succession. Gaulin became the bishop in the diocese of Kingston in 1840 when MacDonell died.

Toronto saw an influx of Irish immigrants, many of whom did not attend church regularly. At the instigation of Bishop Gaulin, Bishop Ignace Bourget led the French-Canadian hierarchy to petition for a new diocese. Michael Power, the vicar general of Montreal, was chosen as the first bishop of the Diocese of Toronto. Power had been born in Nova Scotia of Irish parents and spoke French. Bishop Gaulin said, "This gentleman is sufficiently Irish to be well thought of here and sufficiently Canadian to live up to all we might expect of him." Bishop Power died of typhus in 1847, contracted while ministering to the sick.

Beginning in 1841 Gaulin's physical and mental health began to deteriorate. Bishop Bourget brought Gaulin to Montreal and appointed Patrick Phelan as coadjutor of Kingston. The latter was ordained bishop on 20 August 1843 and administered the diocese from then onwards. Bishop Gaulin died on 8 May 1857 in Sainte-Philomène, near Montreal. He is buried in St. Mary's Cathedral, Kingston.
