= Mary McKay Scott =

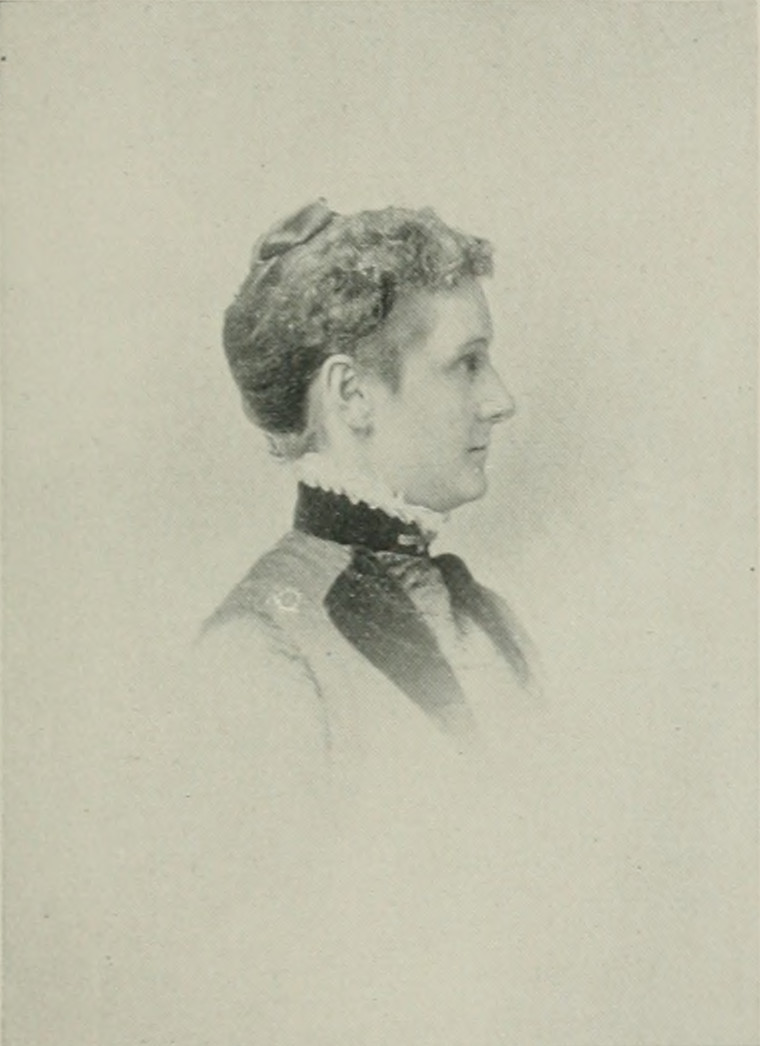
- Portrait photo from A Woman of the Century
- Born: August 17, 1851; Bytown, Canada
- Died: October 24, 1932 (aged 81); Ottawa, Canada
- Other name: Yarrow
- Occupations: social reformer; journalist; writer
- Known for: Proprietor, publisher, and editor of the Woman's Journal
- Relatives: Thomas McKay (great-uncle)

Mary McKay Scott (pen name, Yarrow; 1851–1932) was a Canadian temperance reformer and the proprietor, publisher, and editor of a woman's journal. She also wrote travel articles and short stories. She held memberships in several organizations, serving in leadership roles in some of them.

== Early life and education ==
Mary McKay Scott was born in Ottawa, Canada, then called Bytown, on August 17, 1851. Her father was Alexander Scott, a businessman and alderman for Wellington Ward. Her mother was Alison McKay, a niece of Thomas McKay of Rideau Hall. A brother, William, served as president of the Ottawa Board of Trade, and another brother, George, was connected with the Ottawa Electric Company. Her mother's family was among the pioneers of the Ottawa.

Scott attended the Ottawa Private School and Bute House, a private school in Montreal. Abbie M. Harmon of Ottawa and Annie M. Mcintosh of Montreal were two of her teachers. While a schoolgirl in Montreal, she attended Lord Cecil's revival services, which changed the course of her life.

== Career ==
For more than 24 years, Scott worked as a civil servant, including for the Ministry of home affairs.

She heard Frances Willard in Boston, in 1877, for the first time, but did not listen attentively.

In 1882, she attended the Ottawa Woman's Christian Temperance Union (WCTU) annual meeting, when Sir Samuel Leonard Tilley presided as chairman. Scott was struck with the earnestness of the women, the reasonableness of the cause, and the evident Christian spirit, and that day, she joined the organization. She was immediately put on a committee, and she filled many offices, especially those related to the work of young women. These office included Dominion Superintendent, Young Woman's WCTU; custodian, Dominion WCTU's Literature Depository; and WCTU press superintendent. She became an earnest advocate for the prohibition of liquor traffic.

The first official organ of the Dominion WCTU was the Woman's Journal, a monthly publication started in 1884 by Addie Chisholm and adopted in 1889 by the Dominion WCTU under Scott's management. From the beginning, there was an urgent need for distinctly Canadian temperance publications. For nine years after that, Scott was the editor, publisher, and proprietor of the Woman's Journal, published monthly.

Her literary work included stories and descriptions of travel for Canadian papers. Having spent her summers for more than three decades at Yarrow Cottage in Chelsea, Quebec, she wrote much about Chelsea and the Gatineau district in The Citizen and other publications.

Scott was the Ottawa Girl Guides president and Interim Secretary of the National Council of Women of Canada. She was president of the YWCA, being a life member of the latter's board; she attended the YWCA's World Conference in Berlin in 1910. Scott was the founder and president of the Ottawa branch of the Canadian Women's Press Club. She was also a member of the Ottawa Field-Naturalists' Club.

Scott taught at the Kitchen Garden on the kindergarten plan. For 30 years, she worked as a Sunday school teacher at St. Andrew's Presbyterian Church. She was engaged in other church work as well. Later, she joined the Chalmers United Church.

== Death and legacy ==
She made her home in Ottawa, where she died on October 24, 1932. The interment was at that city's Beechwood Cemetery.

Some of Scott's writings are held in the Women's Canadian Historical Society of Ottawa (WCHSO) collections by the Historical Society of Ottawa.
