= Patrick Phelan (bishop of Kingston) =

Canadian Roman Catholic priest

- Bishop of Kingston
- Diocese: Kingston
- Installed: May 8, 1857
- Term ended: June 7, 1857
- Predecessor: Rémi Gaulin
- Successor: Edward John Horan
- Other posts: Auxiliary Bishop of Kingston (1843-1852); Coadjutor Bishop of Kingston (1852-1857)

Personal details
- Born: February 14, 1795 Ballyragget (Republic of Ireland)
- Died: June 6, 1857 (aged 62) Kingston, Upper Canada

Patrick Phelan (February 1795 – June 6, 1857) was a Canadian Roman Catholic priest, Sulpician, and Bishop of Kingston briefly in 1857.

== Life ==
Patrick Phelan was born in January or February, 1795 in Ballyragget, Ireland) to farmers Joseph and Catharine Brennan Phelan. He first studied under the local parish priest, before attending a Latin school in Freshford. In 1816 he went to the Castlemarket Academy in Ballyragget until it closed in 1820.

After a short period as tutor to the children of a Catholic gentleman near Carrick-on-Suir, Phelan emigrated to the United States in 1821. Bishop of Boston Jean-Louis Lefebvre de Cheverus sent him to Montreal to study for the priesthood. On 24 Sept. 1825, with Bishop Jean-Jacques Lartigue presiding, Phelan became the first priest to be ordained in Montreal's newly consecrated church of Saint-Jacques. Two months later, he entered the Society of the Priests of Saint Sulpice and was assigned to serve in the parish of Notre-Dame. He spent the next 17 years ministering to the city's Irish Catholics.

Phelan provided medical care during the cholera epidemics of 1832 and 1834, and saw to the destitute widows and orphans, sometimes at his own expense. The Awful Disclosures of Maria Monk was published in 1836. In it, she accused Phelan as the father of her illegitimate child, allegedly conceived in the convent. Due to Phelan's high esteem in the community and flagrant inconsistencies in her story, he had little difficulty weathering the storm. The book is considered by scholars to be an anti-Catholic hoax.

Phelan made missionary visits to the Ottawa valley in 1838 and 1841. In 1842 he was named pastor of Bytown and created vicar general of the diocese of Kingston. Prior to his departure, the Irish soldiers of the Montreal garrison gave him an ornamental silver snuff-box in grateful memory of his services to them.

== Bishop ==
Phelan took charge of the Bytown parish on 22 November 1842. On February 20, 1843 he was chosen as titular Bishop of Carrhae and coadjutor of Kingston with right of succession. He received episcopal ordination from Bishop Ignace Bourget in Montreal on August 20, 1843. Because of the illness of Bishop Rémi Gaulin, he began to take on the administration of the Kingston diocese and was appointed administrator of the diocese in January 1852.

In light of his new responsibilities, Phelan looked for a replacement as pastor of Bytown. Bishop Ignace Bourget of Montreal offered to send the Oblates who would not only care for the faithful in Bytown but would also minister to the workers in the loggers’ camps. Phelan brought religious communities to the diocese; in 1845, the Grey Nuns arrived from Montreal. On September 2, 1845 four Religious Hospitallers of St. Joseph arrived in Kingston to establish a hospital. On January 28, 1853, Phelan asked for the bilingual Brothers of the Christian Schools to come to Kingston to aid in the instruction of the young men at Regiopolis College.

Bishop Gaulin died in Montreal on 8 May, 1857 and his body was returned to Kingston for interment in St. Mary's Cathedral (Kingston, Ontario). Bishop Phelan caught a cold at the funeral and died on 6 June from inflammation of the lungs.

== Sources ==
- "Patrick Phelan". Dictionary of Canadian Biography (online ed.). University of Toronto Press. 1979–2016.
