= Edward John Horan =

Canadian Roman Catholic priest

- Bishop of Kingston
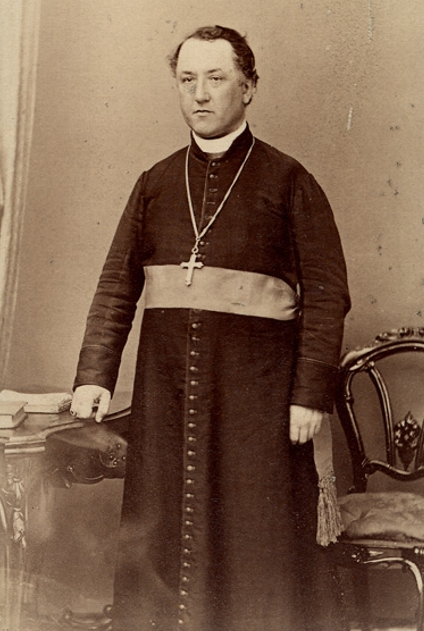
- Diocese: Kingston
- Installed: January 8, 1858
- Term ended: June 16, 1874
- Predecessor: Patrick Phelan
- Successor: John O'Brien

Orders
- Ordination: September 22, 1842

Personal details
- Born: October 26, 1817 Quebec City, Lower Canada
- Died: February 15, 1875 (aged 57) Kingston, Ontario

Edward John Horan (October 26, 1817 – February 15, 1875) was a Canadian Roman Catholic priest and Bishop of Kingston from 1858 to 1875.

== Life ==
Edward John Horan was born in the Parish of Notre Dame in Quebec to Gordian and Eleanore Cannon Horan. His parents served on the committee of management of Saint Patrick's, an English-speaking chapel of Notre Dame. Although his family spoke English, he received his early education in French. He entered the Petit Séminaire in Quebec in September 1830. In 1839 he started at the Grand Séminairé, and was assigned to teach English. He was ordained on September 22, 1842, and continued on the teaching staff of the Grand Séminairé.

Horan was interested in science as applied to agriculture. In 1843 he was appointed professor of natural history at the seminary. In 1844 he wrote a manuscript in French describing 423 different minerals. In February 1848, he went to Harvard University to further his studies. However, he soon transferred to Yale in order to attend the lectures of science educator Benjamin Silliman, and of his son Benjamin. In New Haven he also encountered anti-Catholic American nativism.

Horan returned his teaching duties the following autumn. He made field trips to L'Isle-aux-Coudres in 1849, and to Baie-Saint-Paul in 1850, and worked closely with Louis-Ovide Brunet and Elkanah Billings. He discovered a species of Trilobite on a trip to Cap Tourmente; Billings named it Acidaspis Horani.

He was a director of the Petit Séminaire and secretary of the Université Laval council in 1855, and in 1856 the first principal of the École Normale Laval.

== Bishop ==
In 1858 Horan was appointed fourth bishop of Kingston to succeed Patrick Phelan. He was consecrated on 1 May at St Patrick's Church in Quebec.

Bishop Horan was one of the founders of the Sisters of Providence of St. Vincent de Paul. In 1861 he negotiated an agreement with the Sisters of Providence (Montreal) and Bishop Bourget for the sisters to establish a temporary house in Kingston to receive postulants and train them in both religious life and social service, after which they would return to Montreal.

In 1867 he was named a director of the Université Laval. He was good friends with John A. Macdonald, among other political figures.

His health began to fail. Horan resigned as bishop on 28 May 1874. He died on February 15, 1875, and was laid to rest with the previous Bishops of Kingston in the vault below St. Mary's Cathedral.

== Sources ==
- "Edward John Horan". Dictionary of Canadian Biography (online ed.). University of Toronto Press. 1979–2016.
