= Michael Mulhall =

The Most Reverend Michael Mulhall
- Archbishop of Kingston
- Church: Roman Catholic Church
- Archdiocese: Kingston
- See: Kingston
- Appointed: 28 March 2019
- Installed: 3 May 2019
- Predecessor: Brendan Michael O'Brien
- Previous post: Bishop of Pembroke (2007-19)

Orders
- Ordination: 21 July 1989 by James Leonard Doyle
- Consecration: 21 September 2007 by Luigi Ventura

Personal details
- Born: Michael Mulhall; 25 February 1962 (age 64) Peterborough, Ontario, Canada
- Parents: Vernon Mulhall; Maureen Hickey
- Education: Trent University; Pontifical University of Saint Thomas Aquinas; Patristicum
- Motto: Fiduciam habemus apud Deum ("We have confidence before God")
- Coat of arms

Styles of Michael Mulhall
- Reference style: The Most Reverend
- Spoken style: Your Grace/ My Lord Archbishop
- Religious style: Monsignor

Michael Mulhall (born 25 February 1962) is a Canadian prelate of the Roman Catholic Church. Since 2019, he has been the Archbishop of Kingston, Canada. Prior to that, he served the Bishop of Pembroke from 2007 to 2019.

== Biography ==
One of five children, Michael Mulhall was born in Peterborough, Ontario, to Vernon and Maureen (née Hickey) Mulhall. He attended Trent University, from where he obtained a Bachelor of Arts degree in 1985, and then furthered his studies in Rome at the Angelicum, earning a Bachelor of Sacred Theology in 1988. Ordained to the priesthood on 21 July 1989, he received a Licentiate of Sacred Theology from the Augustinianum in 1991 while following the formation program at the Pontifical North American College.

Mulhall did pastoral work in Hunstville from 1991 to 1994. He then became an official of the Congregation for the Oriental Churches in the Roman Curia. Returning to the Diocese of Peterborough in 2002, he served again briefly in Huntsville and then in Hastings. In 2003, he was also named Chancellor for Spiritual Affairs, and in 2004 as Vicar General of the Diocese.

On 30 June 2007, Mulhall was appointed the eighth Bishop of Pembroke by Pope Benedict XVI. He received his episcopal consecration on the following 21 September from Archbishop Luigi Ventura, with Archbishop Terrence Prendergast, S.J., and Bishop Nicola De Angelis, serving as co-consecrators, at St Columbkille Cathedral. He selected as his episcopal motto: Fiduciam habemus apud Deum, meaning, "We have confidence before God".

Pope Francis appointed Mulhall Archbishop of Kingston on March 28, 2019. He was installed on May 3.

Catholic Church titles
Preceded by Richard William Smith	Bishop of Pembroke; 2007–2020	Succeeded by Guy Desrochers, C.Ss.R.
