= Louis-Ovide Brunet =

French-Canadian botanist and Roman Catholic priest

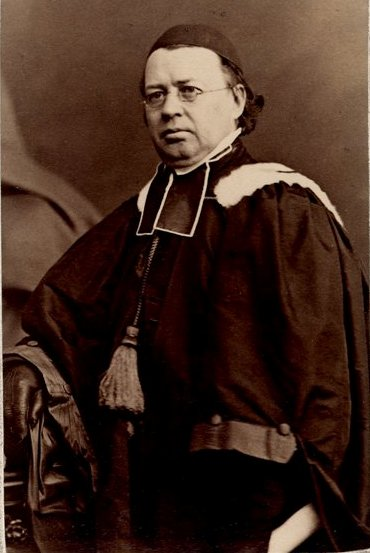
- Born: 10 March 1826; Quebec City, Lower Canada
- Died: 2 October 1876 (aged 50); Quebec City, Quebec
- Known for: priest, botanist

Louis-Ovide Brunet (10 March 1826 – 2 October 1876) was a French-Canadian botanist and Roman Catholic priest, and is considered one of the founding fathers of Canadian botany.

Brunet was born in Quebec City on 10 March 1826, the son of Jean-Olivier Brunet, a merchant, and Cécile Lagueux. From 1844, he was educated at the Séminaire de Québec, and was ordained on 10 October 1848. He was for the next ten years employed variously as a missionary, a curate, and parish priest. Upon the departure of his former mentor, the Abbé Edward John Horan, he was in 1858 appointed teacher of science at his alma mater, which had become Université Laval in 1852 following a grant of a Royal Charter by Queen Victoria. Following the resignation of mineralogist Thomas Sterry Hunt, Brunet succeeded him as the Chair of Natural History. His expertise as a botanist developed following field work in Ontario and Quebec, as well as two years spent in visiting European herbaria and a course of lectures at the Sorbonne, the Jardin des Plantes, and the Muséum national d'Histoire naturelle in Paris, France. He corresponded with noted American botanist Asa Gray who encouraged him to undertake a survey of Canadian flora. This work, commenced in 1860 and encompassing more than 582 pages, was never published, partly as the result of its anticipation in 1862 upon the publication of Flore canadienne by his competitor Léon Provancher. In 1870 he published his first major botanical work, Éléments de botanique et de physiologie végétale, suivis d'une petite flore simple et facile pour aider à découvrir les noms des plantes les plus communes au Canada. Nevertheless, success eluded him, and with his health failing, he retired at age 44 to the home of his mother and sister. He died in Quebec City on 2 October 1876.

== See also ==
- List of Roman Catholic scientist-clerics
