= Archdiocese of Kingston, Ontario =

Latin Catholic archdiocese in Canada

Coordinates: 44°14′13″N 76°30′53″W

Archdiocese of Kingston Archidioecesis Kingstonensis Archidioecesis Regiopolitana
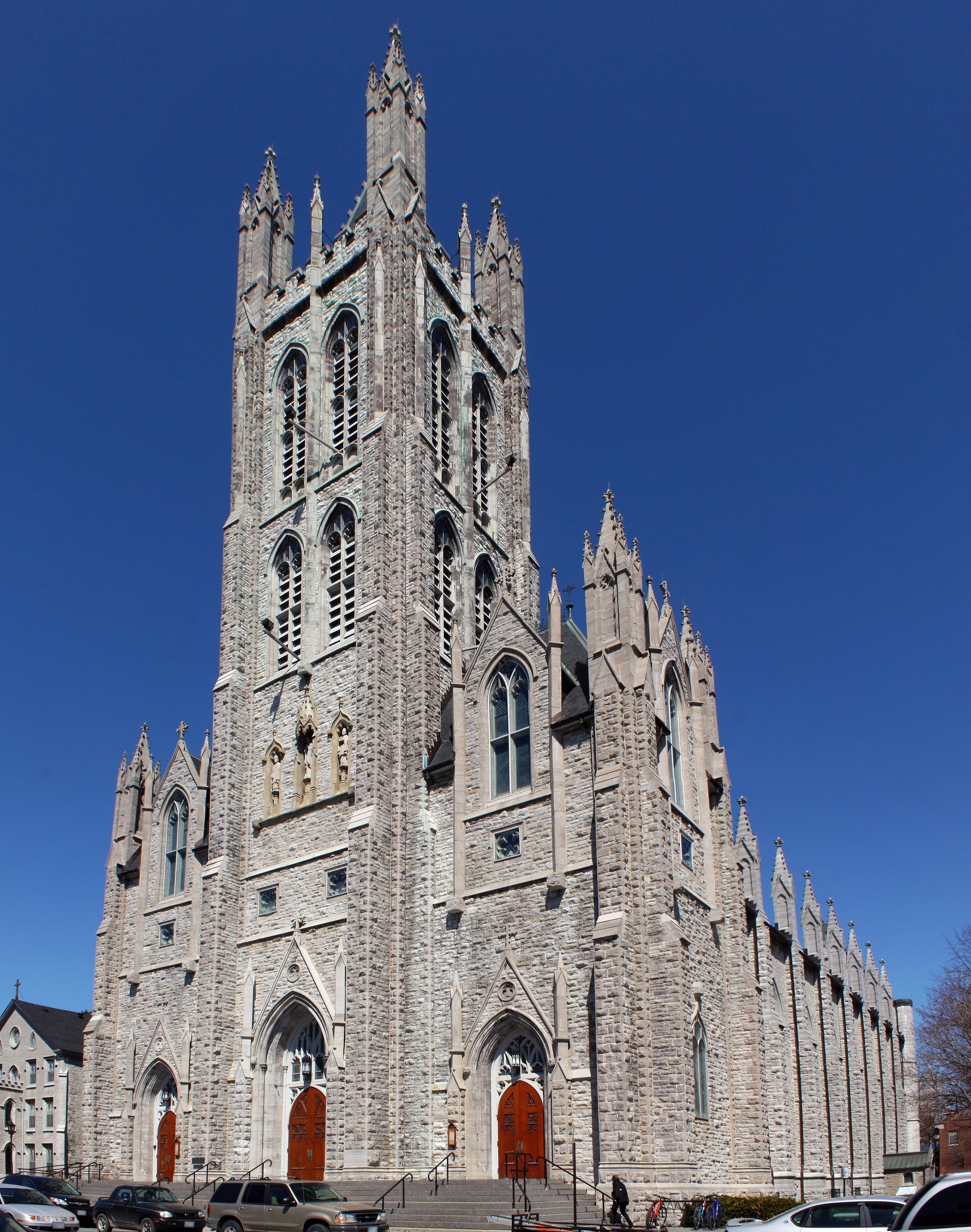
- St. Mary's Cathedral, Kingston

Location
- Country: Canada
- Territory: Eastern Ontario, St. Lawrence Valley
- Ecclesiastical province: Archdiocese of Kingston

Statistics
- Population: Total; Catholics: (as of 2021); 371,450; 135,170 (36.4%)
- Parishes: 51

Information
- Denomination: Catholic Church
- Sui iuris church: Latin Church
- Rite: Roman Rite
- Established: 1 December 1819
- Cathedral: St. Mary's Cathedral
- Patron saint: St. Mary

Current leadership
- Pope: Leo XIV
- Archbishop: Michael Mulhall

Map

Website
- romancatholic.kingston.on.ca

The Archdiocese of Kingston (Latin: Archidioecesis Kingstoniensis/Regiopolitana) is a Latin Church archdiocese of the Catholic Church in Canada that includes part of the federal Province of Ontario in southeastern Canada.

Its cathedral is St. Mary's Cathedral, dedicated to the Immaculate Conception, in Kingston, Ontario.

== Ecclesiastical province ==
Its suffragan sees are:

- Diocese of Peterborough
- Diocese of Sault Sainte Marie, Ontario

== History ==
- Established on 1819.01.12 as Apostolic Vicariate of Upper Canada, on territory split off from the then Roman Catholic Diocese of Québec.
- Promoted as Diocese of Kingston on 27 January 1826, as a suffragan diocese of the (meanwhile promoted) Archdiocese of Quebec. Prior to 1841 when the Diocese of Toronto was created, the diocese included areas that are now part of the Dioceses of Hamilton, London, Saint Catharines, Thunder Bay and Toronto.
- Lost territory repeatedly : on 1841.12.17 to establish Diocese of Toronto, on 1847.06.25 to establish Diocese of Bytown, on 1874.01.25 to establish Apostolic Vicariate of Northern Canada (now suffragan Diocese of Peterborough) and on 1882.07.11 lost territory to the existent Diocese of Peterborough;
- Promoted to Metropolitan Archdiocese of Kingston on 28 December 1889.
- Lost territory again on 1890.01.21 to establish the Diocese of Alexandria in Ontario.

== Statistics ==
As of 2014, it pastorally served 123,800 Catholics (36.4% of 340,000 total) on 16,500 km^{2} in 50 parishes with 79 priests (70 diocesan, 9 religious), 29 deacons, 149 lay religious (9 brothers, 140 sisters) and 5 seminarians.

As of 2004, the archdiocese has 52 parishes, 79 active diocesan priests, 7 religious priests and 120,000 Catholics, 165 Women Religious, 11 Religious Brothers and 17 permanent deacons.

== Bishops ==
=== Bishops of the diocese ===
Apostolic Vicar of Upper Canada

- Alexander MacDonell (born Scotland, UK) (1819.01.12 – 27 January 1826 see below) Titular Bishop of Resaina (1819.01.12 – 1826.01.27)

Suffragan Bishops of Kingston :

- Alexander MacDonell (see above 27 January 1826 – death 1840)
- Rémi Gaulin (first Canadian incumbent) (1840.01.14 – death 1857.05.08), succeeding as former Coadjutor Bishop of Kingston (1833.05.10 – 1840.01.14) and Titular Bishop of Tabraca (1833.05.10 – 1840.01.14), succeeding as former Titular Bishop of Charræ (1843.02.20 – 1857.05.08) and first Auxiliary Bishop of Kingston (1843.02.20 – 1852), then Coadjutor Bishop of Kingston (1852 – 1857.05.08)
- Patrick Phelan (born Ireland) (1857.05.08 – death 1857.06.07)
- Edward John Horan (1858.01.08 – retired 1874.05.28), emeritate as Titular Bishop of Chrysopolis in Arabia (1874.06.16 – died 1875.02.15)
- John O'Brien (1875.02.12 – death 1879.08.01)
- James Vincent Cleary (1880.10.01 – 1889.12.28 see below) (born Ireland)

Metropolitan Archbishops of Kingston :

- James Vincent Cleary (see above 1889.12.28 – death 1898.02.24)
- Charles-Hugues Gauthier (1898.07.29 – 1910.09.06), next Metropolitan Archbishop of Ottawa (Ontario, Canada) (1910.09.06 – death 1922.01.19)
- Michael Joseph Spratt (1911.07.17 – death 1938.02.23)
- Richard Michael Joseph O'Brien (1938.02.23 – death 1943.08.30), previously Bishop of Peterborough (Canada) (1913.06.20 – 1929.05.17), Titular Archbishop of Amorium (1929.05.17 – 1938.02.23) as Coadjutor Archbishop of Kingston (Canada) (1929.05.17 – 1938.02.23)
- Joseph Anthony O'Sullivan (1944.02.26 – 1966.12.14), previously Bishop of Charlottetown (Canada) (1931.02.06 – 1944.02.26); emeritate as Titular Archbishop of Maraguia (1966.12.14 – resigned 1970.11.23), died 1972
- Joseph Lawrence Wilhelm (1966.12.14 – resigned 1982.03.12), died 1995; previously Titular Bishop of Saccæa (1963.06.25 – 1966.12.14) as Auxiliary Bishop of Diocese of Calgary (BC, Canada) (1963.06.25 – 1966.12.14)
- Francis John Spence (1982.04.24 – retired 2002.04.27), also Military Ordinary of Canada (1986.07.21 – 1987.10.28), President of Canadian Conference of Catholic Bishops (1995 – 1997); previously Titular Bishop of Nova (1967.04.01 – 1970.08.17) as Auxiliary Bishop of the Military Vicariate of Canada (1967.04.01 – 1970.08.17), Bishop of Charlottetown (Canada) (1970.08.17 – 1982.03.14), Military Vicar of Canada (Canada) (1982.03.14 – 1986.07.21); died 2011
- Anthony G. Meager (2002.04.27 – death 2007.01.14), previously Titular Bishop of Dura (1997.04.30 – 2002.04.27) as Auxiliary Bishop of Archdiocese of Toronto (Canada) (1997.04.30 – 2002.04.27)
- Brendan Michael O'Brien (2007 – 2019), previously Titular Bishop of Numana (1987.05.06 – 1993.05.05) as Auxiliary Bishop of Archdiocese of Ottawa (Canada) (1987.05.06 – 1993.05.05), Bishop of Pembroke (Canada) (1993.05.05 – 2000.12.04), Metropolitan Archbishop of St. John’s, Newfoundland (Canada) (2000.12.04 – 2007.06.01), President of Canadian Conference of Catholic Bishops (2003 – 2005).
- Michael Mulhall (2019 – present)

=== Coadjutor bishops ===
- Thomas Weld (1826-1830), did not succeed to the see; future Cardinal
- John Larkin (1832; did not take effect)
- John Murdoch (1833; did not take effect)
- Rémi Gaulin (1833-1840)
- Patrick Phelan, P.S.S. (1843-1852; apostolic administrator, 1852-1857)
- Michael Joseph O'Brien (1929-1938)

Other priest of this diocese who became Bishop

- Fergus Patrick McEvay, appointed Bishop of London in 1899

== See also ==
- List of Catholic dioceses in Canada

== Sources and external links ==
- Archdiocese of Kingston — official site
- Quinn, Stanley John (1910). "Archdiocese of Kingston" . In Herbermann, Charles (ed.). Catholic Encyclopedia. Vol. 8. New York: Robert Appleton Company.
- GCatholic, with Google map & satellite photo - data for all sections
