= Chalmers United Church (Kingston, Ontario) =

Church in Ontario, Canada

Coordinates: 44°13′45″N 76°29′27″W

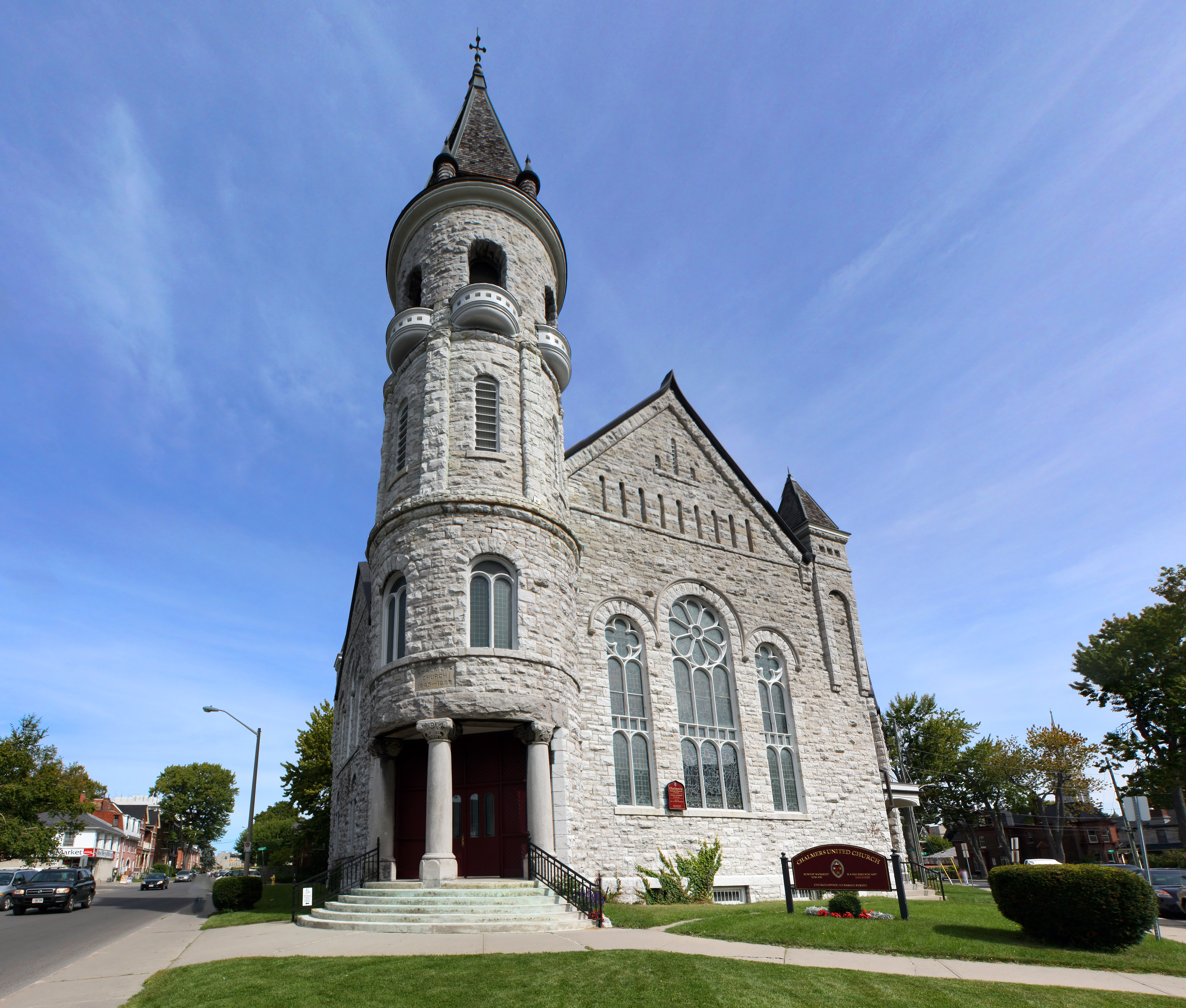
- Chalmers United Church (Kingston, Ontario)
- Denomination: United Church of Canada
- Website: www.chalmersunitedchurch.com

History
- Dedication: Thomas Chalmers

Administration
- Province: Canada
- Diocese: United Diocese of Ontario
- Parish: Ontario

Chalmers United Church in Kingston, Ontario, Canada, is a United Church of Canada church. It is located on a triangular property at the intersection of Clergy, Barrie and Earl streets, immediately bordering the north-east corner of Queen's University. It is one of four churches located within 600m along Clergy Street (the other three are St. Mary's Cathedral, St. Andrew's Presbyterian Church, and Queen Street United Church). It is named after Thomas Chalmers.

== History ==
The building was constructed in 1890 as The Chalmers Free Presbyterian Church. It was renamed to Chalmers United Church in 1925 with the creation of the United Church of Canada.
