= Diocese of Pembroke =

Catholic ecclesiastical territory

Diocese of Pembroke Dioecesis Pembrokensis Diocèse de Pembroke
- Coat of Arms of the Diocese of Pembroke

Location
- Country: Canada
- Ecclesiastical province: Ottawa
- Population: 65,600 (49.7%)

Information
- Denomination: Roman Catholic
- Rite: Roman Rite
- Established: 4 May 1898
- Cathedral: St. Columbkille Cathedral
- Patron saint: St. Columba

Current leadership
- Pope: Leo XIV
- Bishop: Michael Brehl CSsR
- Vicar General: Rev. Michael Smith

Website
- pembrokediocese.com

The Roman Catholic Diocese of Pembroke (Latin: Dioecesis Pembrokensis) (erected 11 July 1882, as the Vicariate Apostolic of Pontiac) is a suffragan of the Archdiocese of Ottawa. It was elevated as the Diocese of Pembroke on 4 May 1898. The Cathedral of St. Columbkille in Pembroke is the mother church of the Diocese of Pembroke.

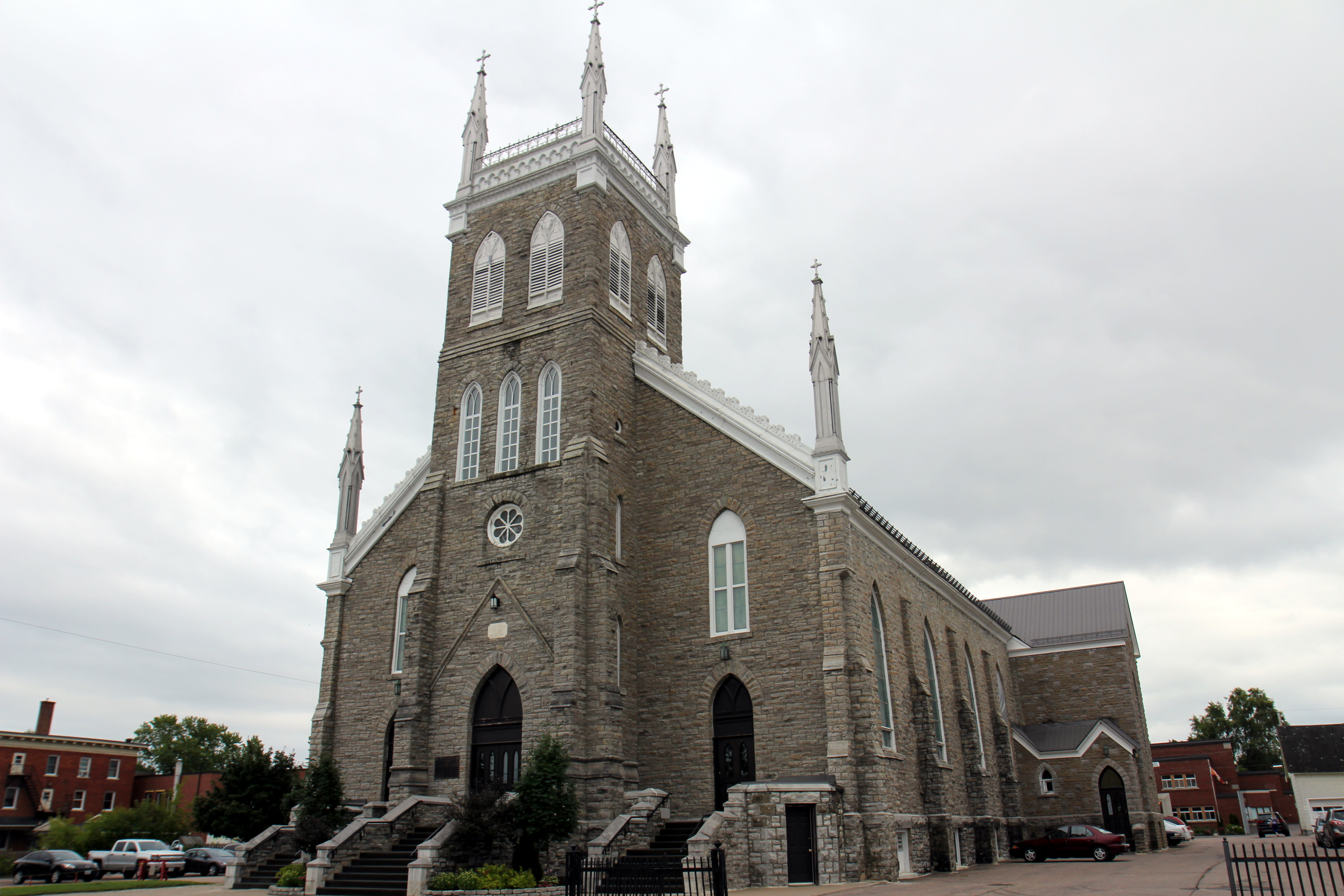
Looking left at the exterior of St. Columbkille Cathedral

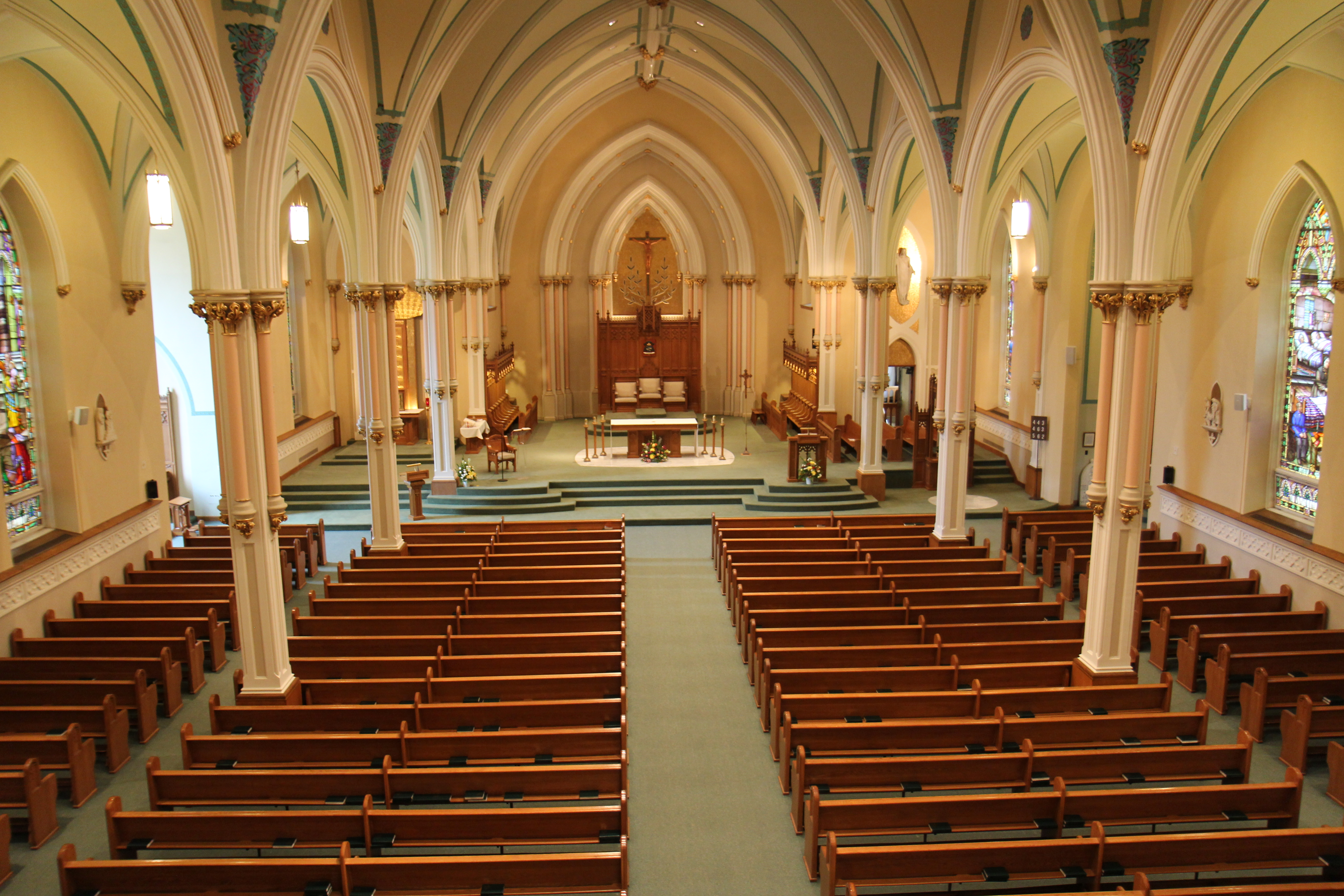
Interior of St. Columbkille Cathedral from the choir loft

== Bishops ==
=== Ordinaries ===
- Narcisse Zéphirin Lorrain (1882–1915)
- Patrick Thomas Ryan (1916–1937)
- Charles Leo Nelligan (1937–1945)
- William Joseph Smith (1945–1971)
- Joseph Raymond Windle (1971–1993)
- Brendan Michael O'Brien (1993–2000), appointed Archbishop of Saint John's, Newfoundland
- Richard William Smith (2002–2007), appointed Archbishop of Edmonton, Alberta
- Michael Mulhall (2007–2019), appointed Archbishop of Kingston, Ontario
- Guy Desrochers CSsR (2020-2023), appointed Archbishop of Moncton, New Brunswick
- Michael Brehl CSsR (2024 - present)

=== Coadjutor bishop ===
- Joseph Raymond Windle (1969–1971)

=== Auxiliary bishop ===
- Patrick Thomas Ryan (1912–1916), appointed Bishop here

=== Other priests of this diocese who became bishops ===
- Élie Anicet Latulipe, appointed Vicar Apostolic of Temiskaming, Ontario in 1908
- Michael Alphonsus Harrington, appointed Bishop of Kamloops, British Columbia in 1952 and died in 1973
- James Matthew Wingle, appointed Bishop of Yarmouth, Nova Scotia in 1993

=== Educational Institutions ===
- Renfrew County Catholic District School Board

=== Cemeteries ===
- St. Columba's Cemetery (Pembroke)

== Territorial losses ==
Year	Along with	To form
1908		Vicariate Apostolic of Temiskaming

== Bibliography ==
- "Diocese of Pembroke". Catholic-Hierarchy.
- Herbermann, Charles, ed. (1913). "Diocese of Pembroke" . Catholic Encyclopedia. New York: Robert Appleton Company.
