= Basilica of Our Lady Immaculate =

Basilica of Our Lady
- Basilica Our Lady of the Immaculate Conception
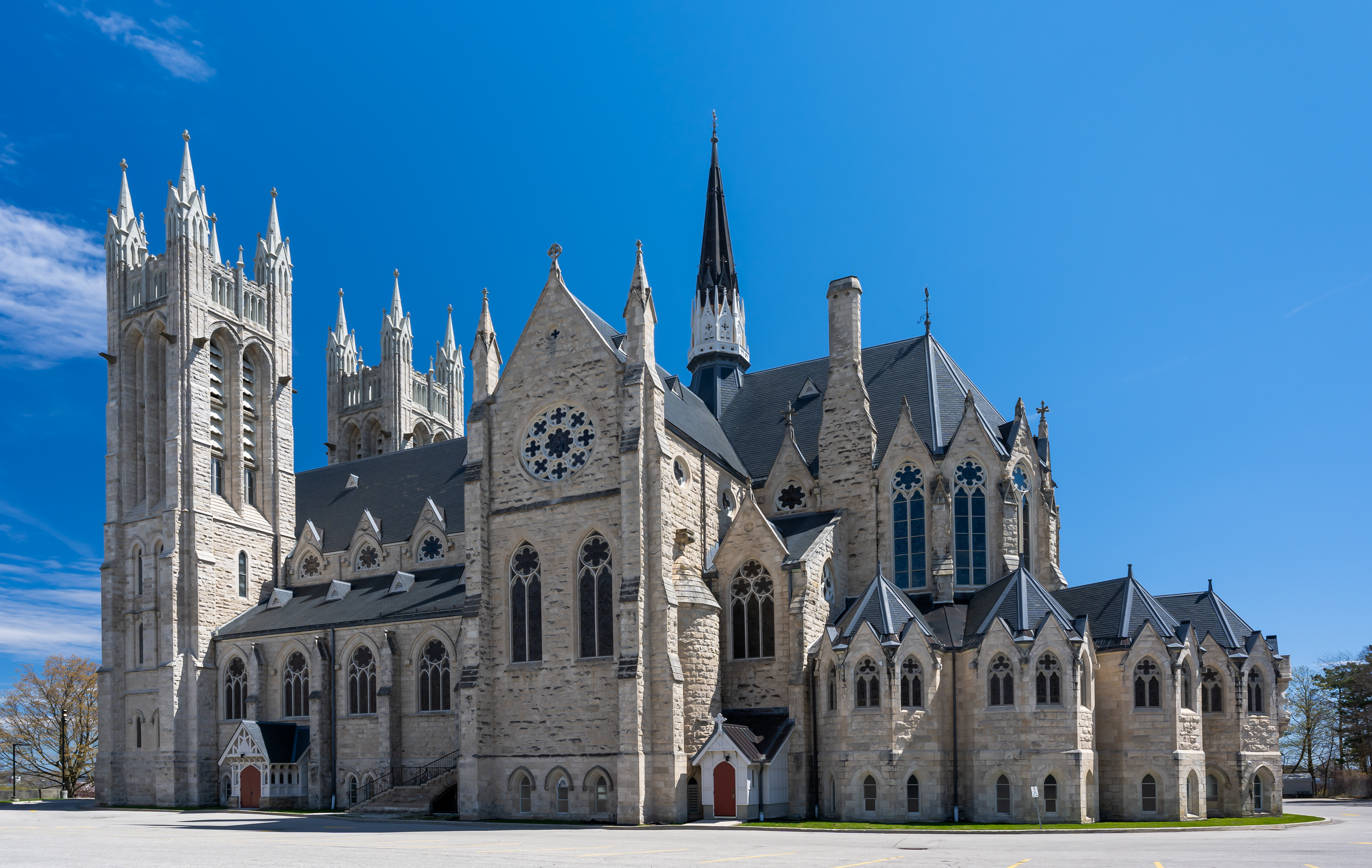
- Southwest view of the basilica

- Location within Southern Ontario
- 43°32′35.3″N 80°15′4.2″W
- Location: Guelph, Ontario
- Country: Canada
- Denomination: Roman Catholic
- Website: basilicaofourlady.com

History
- Status: Minor basilica, Diocesan Marian Shrine
- Dedication: 1883

Architecture
- Heritage designation: National Historic Site of Canada
- Designated: 1990
- Architect: Joseph Connolly
- Architectural type: Norman-Gothic

Administration
- Province: Toronto
- Diocese: Hamilton
- Deanery: Wellington

Basilica of Our Lady of the Immaculate Conception is a Roman Catholic minor basilica and parish church located at 28 Norfolk Street in Guelph, Ontario, Canada. A Gothic Revival style building constructed between 1876 and 1888 by architect Joseph Connolly, it is considered Connolly's best work. The monumental church contains decorative carving and stained glass executed by skilled craftsmen. The church of Our Lady is one of the 122 parishes in the Diocese of Hamilton and currently has 2,600 families in the congregation.

In 1990, the church was designated a National Historic Site of Canada. Pope Francis designated the church a basilica on 8 December 2014.

== History ==
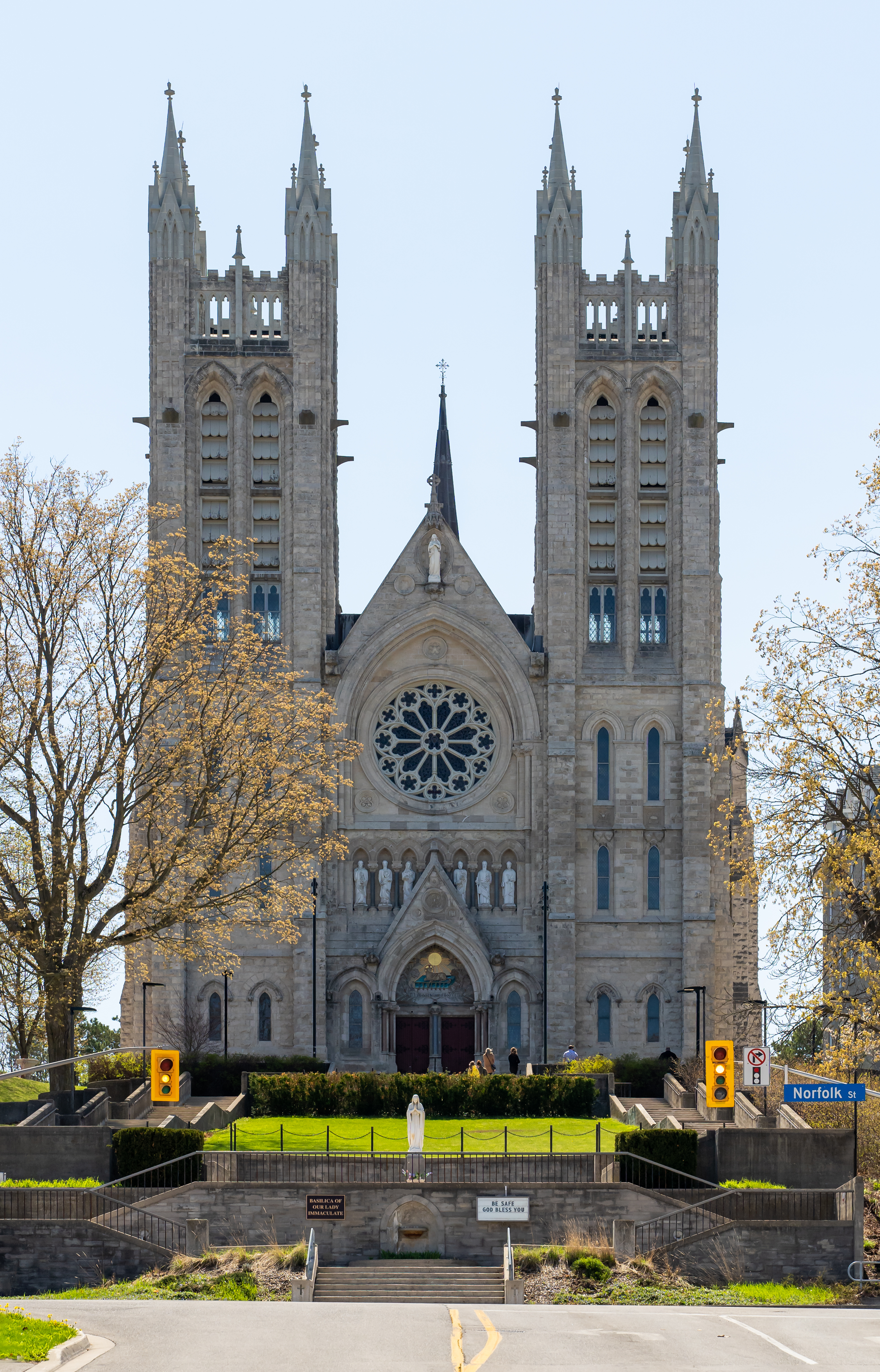
The main entrance to the basilica features a twin-towered facade.

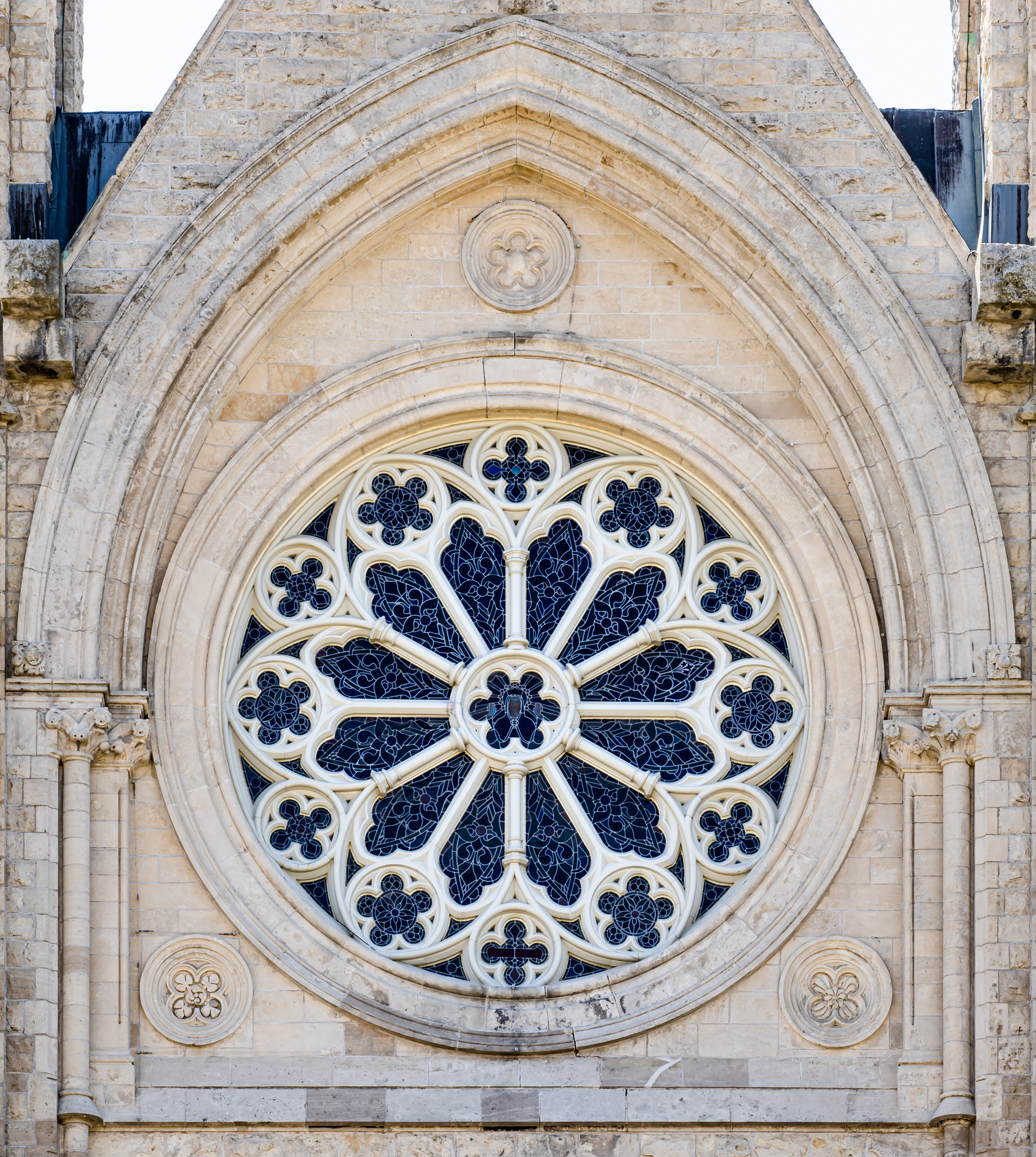
The rose window of the portal.

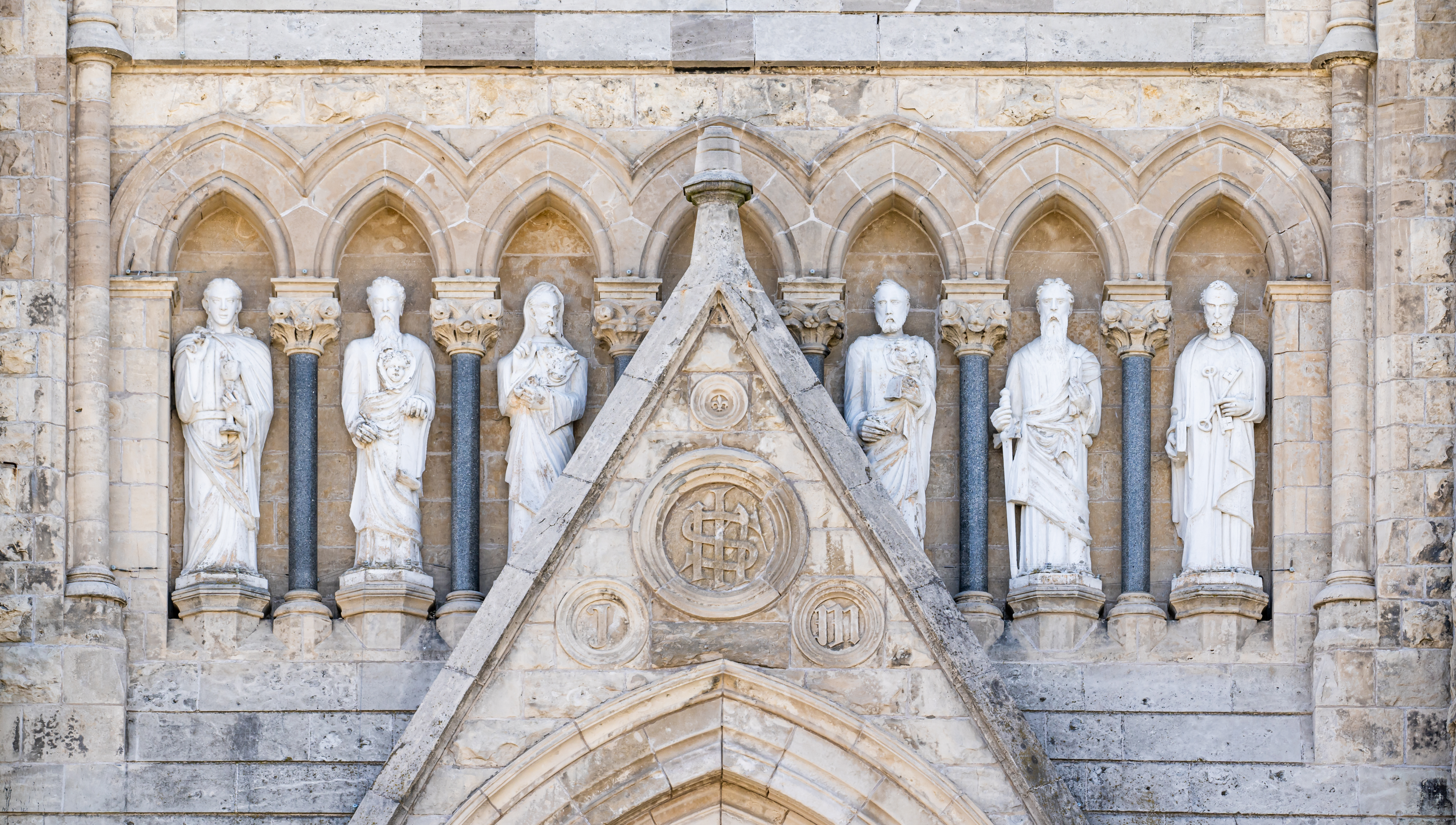
Detail of the portal.

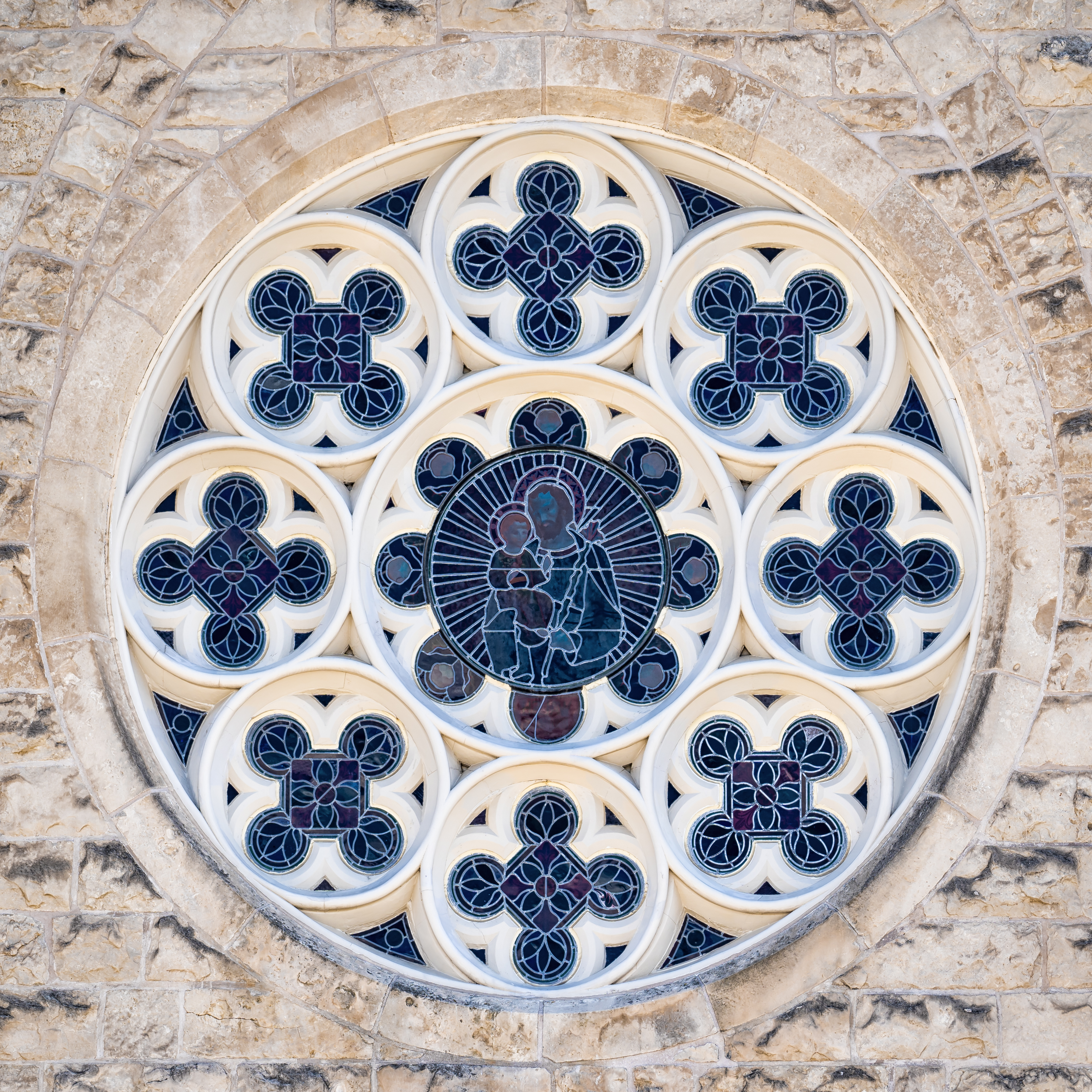
The side rose window of the basilica.

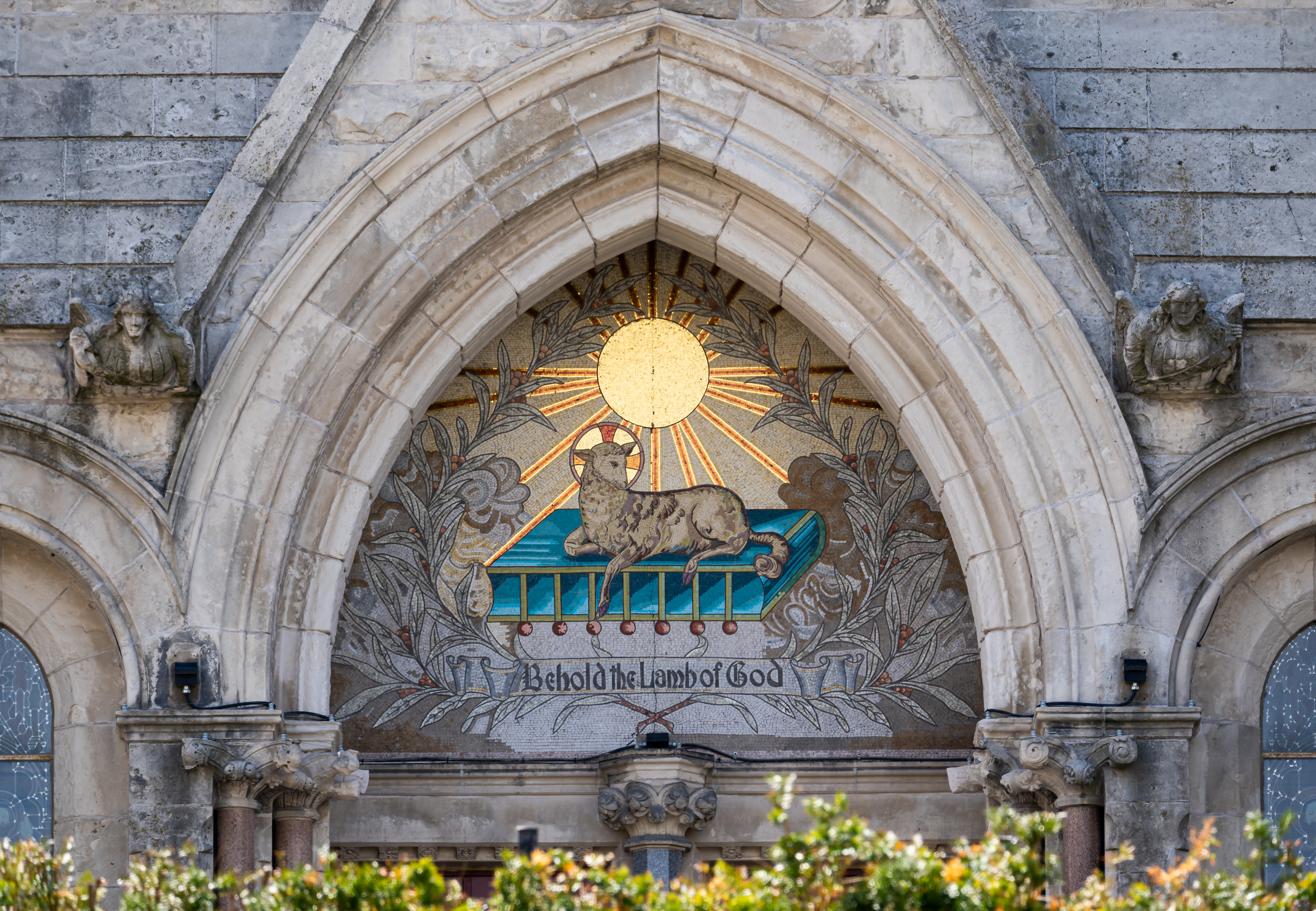
The mosaic of the portal.

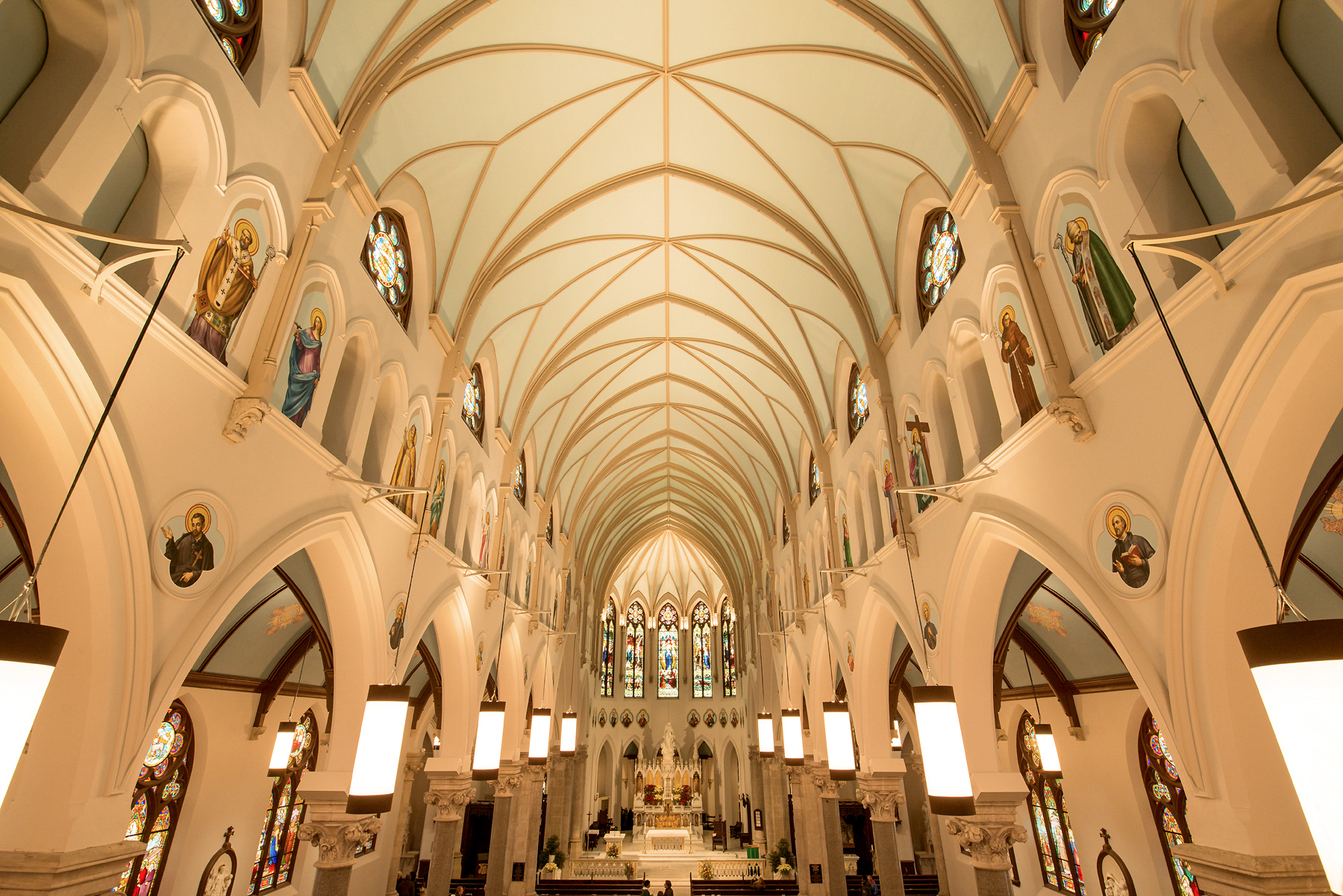
The interior of the basilica, post-renovations in 2015

When John Galt founded Guelph on April 23, 1827, he allocated the highest point in the centre of the newly founded town to Roman Catholics as a compliment to his friend, Bishop Alexander Macdonell, who had given him advice in the formation of the Canada Company. A road was also later cleared leading up to the hill and named after the Bishop, called Macdonell Street.

According to the Guelph Public Library archives, Galt wrote the following statement in the deed transferring the land on which the Church of Our Lady would one day stand: "On this hill would one day rise a church to rival St. Peter's in Rome."

The Roman Catholic Church of Our Lady Immaculate is the third church to stand on this site, high above the streetscape, overlooking the city of Guelph. The first church, a framed wooden church named St. Patrick's, had been built on the hill by 1835 and was the first structure in Guelph that was painted on both its interior and exterior. It burned to the ground on October 10, 1844.

Construction on St. Bartholomew's Church began shortly after St. Patrick's was destroyed. The new building was completed in 1846. The following inscription appeared on the cornerstone of St. Bartholomew's Church: "To God, the best and greatest. The faithful of Guelph, of the diocese of Toronto have built this new Church, in honour of the blessed Apostle Bartholomew, the first church having been consumed in flames."

Construction of the new church, based on the Cologne Cathedral, began in 1877 under Irish-Canadian architect Joseph Connolly who had designed many churches in Ireland, England and Ontario, notably St. Peter's Cathedral in London, Ontario.

Built of local limestone in High Victorian Gothic Revival style, the Church of Our Lady is considered to be Connolly's masterpiece. The design was inspired by the medieval cathedrals of France, and includes twin towers, a large rose window, pointed windows and an interior design where the chapels radiate from the polygonal apse. Matthew Bell, a well-known Guelph artisan, was responsible for some of the carvings on the exterior as well as on the interior pillars of the church. He died in 1883 as a result of injuries sustained in a fall while working on the building. In 1888, almost twelve years after construction commenced, the church was dedicated to Our Lady Immaculate. The twin towers, which rise to a height of over 200 feet (61 m), were not completed until November 13, 1926. The completed church stands at the head of MacDonell Street as an imposing view terminus, similarly to another major project by Connolly, St. Mary's Church in Toronto.

In 1958, the parish added a new entrance from Macdonell Street, but aside from this, the exterior appearance has changed little since 1926. The complete construction of the church took more than 50 years, probably qualifying it as the longest construction project in the city's history. The 100th anniversary was celebrated on 10 October 1988.

Long-awaited restoration of the church began in April 2007 and was completed in December 2014, at a cost of over $12 million. Talk of restoration began in the early 1990s, with work on the slate roof completed in 1992. Subsequent plans for renovating the interior generated some controversy and were put on hold. Initially, the estimated cost of the inside and outside restoration was between $10 million and $12 million and was expected to last until 2008. It included renovations to the towers ($1.2 million), roof, windows and doors, interior and basement. Funding came from both the congregation and the diocese of Hamilton.

The total cost of the work reached about $10 million, including the exterior restoration and the work on the interior, with the installation of new lighting, new flooring and new pews. A new altar, baptismal font and pulpit were also installed and the basement hall was renovated. A slide show available on the Basilica's web site provides high resolution imagery of the final results. The project had been directed by Monsignor Dennis Noon who planned to retire in June 2019 after 16 years at this parish.

In 2019, Bishop Douglas Crosby formally elevated the church to the status of a "Diocesan Marian Shrine" and sent a petition to the Holy See on 12 November 2019, to crown the Marian image of the basilica which has since been enthroned for over a century atop the high altar.

On 8 December 2019, the Congregation for Divine Worship and the Discipline of the Sacraments issued the official decree granting the solemn crowning of the venerated Marian image, in the name and authority of Pope Francis. It would only be until 1 October 2022 that the ceremony would be carried out.

== Design ==
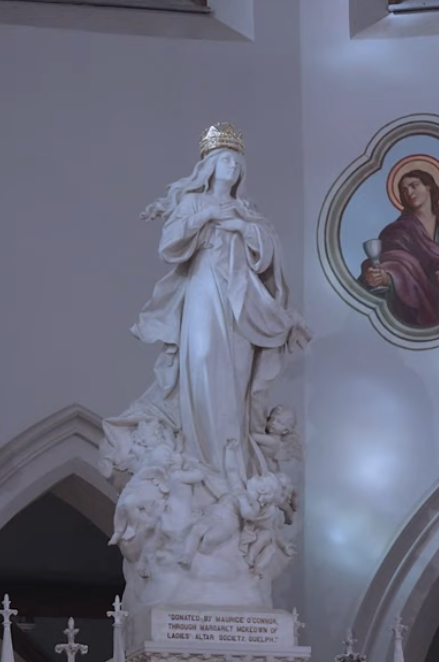
Statue on the high altar of the Basilica, crowned in 2022.

The Government of Canada's Federal Designation document provides additional specifics as to the character defining elements:

French Gothic Revival, including a cruciform plan with side aisles, prominent nave, triforium arcades, apse with radiating chapels and ambulatory, twin-towered façade, spire at the central groin vault, and large rose windows; the sense of verticality, created by the use of steeply pitched roofs with gables, dormers, pinnacles, pointed arches, and tall narrow window openings; the symmetrically organized façade with its twin square towers with pinnacles and paired openings, massive rose window with bar tracery set in a moulded pointed arch, row of lintel statuary set within a blind arcade, and carved tympanum; the division of side elevations into bays defined by engaged buttresses, with each bay accented by a pointed arch and a stained glass window; the north and south transepts, each distinguished by two lancet windows below a large, stained-glass, rose window with flanking narrow pinnacles; the polygonal apse, consisting of radiating gabled chapels with another level of gables above; the extensive use of pointed arches and stained glass windows with bar tracery throughout the composition; the Gothic Revival styling of the interior, including, tall pointed-arch windows in the chancel, clerestories inset with rose windows, stained-glass windows, nave-arcades with false triforium-galleries, granite columns with acanthus capitals supporting the aisle arcades, and rib vaulting; the high quality design and craftsmanship of its interior, including its wood and stone carving, its stained glass, its stencilling, its ironwork, its mosaics, and its excellent acoustics; its prominent siting at the top of a hill overlooking the city; viewscapes to and from the church and the city.

=== City by-laws ===
The City of Guelph's zoning by-laws establish "protected view areas" that are designed to ensure clear sight lines to the Church of Our Lady from various vantage points in the downtown core. Any communication towers or other buildings built in the downtown area must not obscure the view of the church. Also, no new buildings in Guelph were allowed to be higher in elevation than the Church.

Nonetheless, the new Wilson Street parkade at the Market, constructed by the city and opened in late 2019, obstructs views of the church from some locations in the downtown area.

== See also ==
- List of churches in the Roman Catholic Diocese of Hamilton, Ontario
