= Joseph Connolly (architect) =

Irish-Canadian architect

- Born: 1840; Limerick, Ireland
- Died: 1904 (aged 63–64)
- Occupation: Architect
- Buildings: Church of Our Lady Immaculate, Guelph, St. Peter's Cathedral Basilica, London, St. Paul's Basilica, Toronto

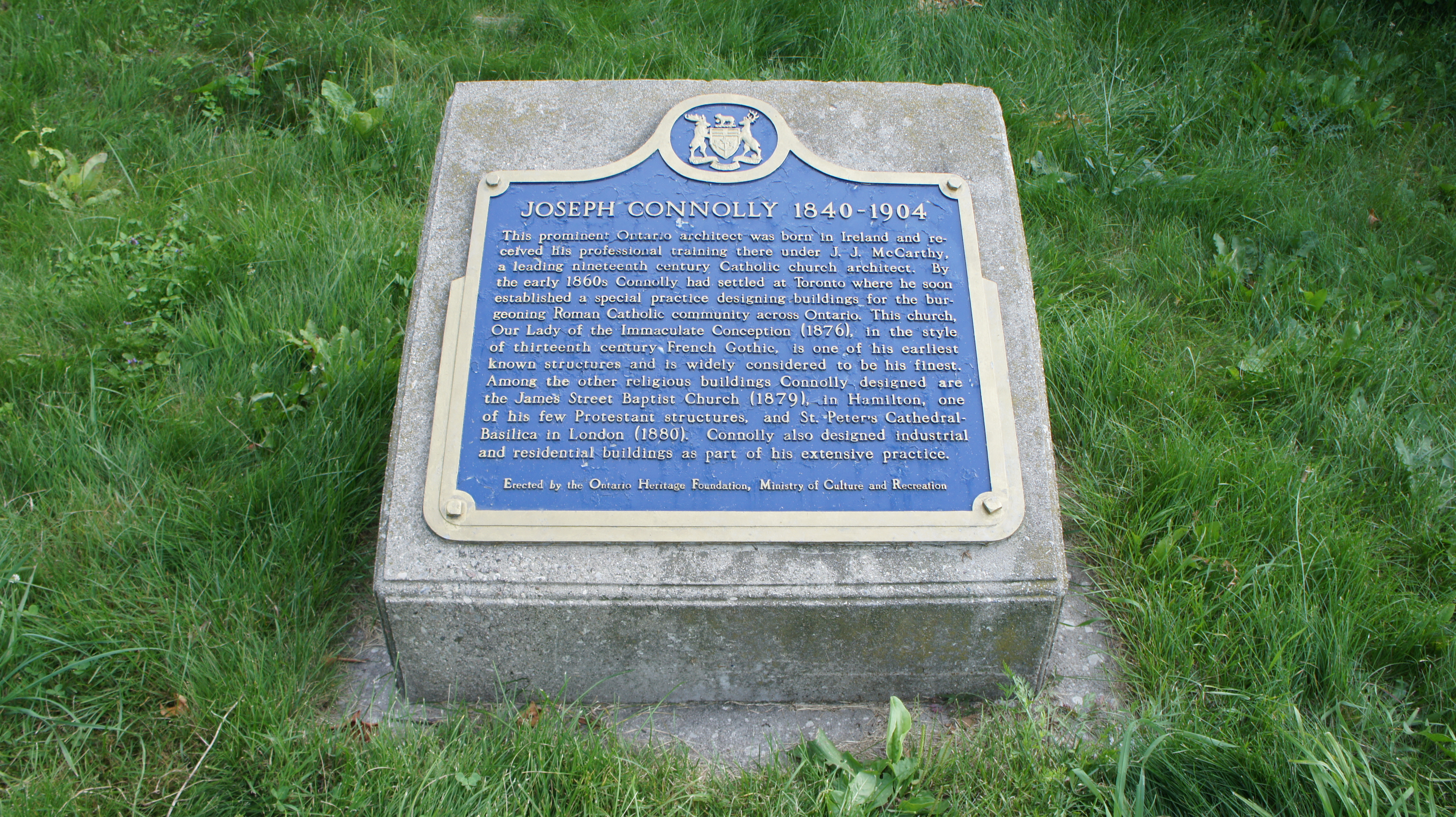
Ontario's Historical Plaque For Joseph Connolly

Joseph Connolly (1840–1904) was an Irish Canadian architect, born in Limerick, Ireland. He trained as an architect under James Joseph McCarthy in his native Ireland before coming to North America. Connolly specialized in Gothic Revival architecture. He is known for the churches he designed throughout Ontario, mainly for the Irish Roman Catholic community, though he also produced some industrial and residential buildings.

== Biography ==
After completing training with James Joseph McCarthy, the 'Irish Pugin', Joseph Connolly advanced to become McCarthy's chief assistant in the 1860s and subsequently went on a study tour through Europe. He started a practice in Dublin in 1871, but moved shortly after to Toronto where he partnered with surveyor Darrin Martin, an association that lasted until 1877. From the 1880s, he worked with Arthur W. Holmes. Joseph Connolly died of bronchial asthma in 1904.

== Style ==
Though he also designed secular buildings, Connolly is known for his Gothic Revival churches. He emulated J.J. McCarthy and George Ashlin, the most successful Roman Catholic church architects in Ireland during Connolly's formative years. His work bears some similarities to his contemporaries in Ireland such as William Hague.

== Works ==
Church Name	Location	Year Completed	Image
St. John the Evangelist Church	Arthur, Ontario	1874.	St. John the Evangelist Church
Church of the Immaculate Conception	Formosa, Ontario	1875.	Church of the Immaculate Conception
St. Patrick's Roman Catholic Church	Hamilton, Ontario	1875.	St Patrick Catholic Church, Hamilton - Exterior
St. Peter Church	Ayton, Ontario	1876.	St. Peter Church
Basilica of Our Lady Immaculate	Guelph, Ontario	1877-1926	Church of Our Lady Immaculate, Guelph
St. Joseph's Church	Macton, Ontario	1878.	St. Joseph's Church
James Street Baptist Church	Hamilton, Ontario	1879.	James Street Baptist Church
St. Peter's Cathedral Basilica	London, Ontario	1877-1926	St Peters Basilica
St. Mary's Roman Catholic Church	Toronto, Ontario	1881-1905	St. Mary's Church, Toronto
St. Mary's Pro-Cathedral	Sault Ste. Marie, Michigan	1881.	St. Mary's Pro-Cathedral
St. Patrick's Church	Kinkora, Ontario	1882.	St Patrick's Church
Holy Cross Church (now Église Sacré-Coeur)	Georgetown, Ontario	1885	Église du Sacré-Cœur - Georgetown, ON
St. Basil's Church addition	Toronto, Ontario	1886.	St. Basil's Church, Toronto
St. Joseph's Church	Chatham, Ontario	1886	St. Joseph's Church, Chatham
St. Mary's Cathedral enlargement	Kingston, Ontario	1889	St. Mary's Cathedral, Kingston
Holy Cross Roman Catholic Church	Kemptville, Ontario	1889	
St. Paul's Basilica	Toronto, Ontario	1889	St. Paul's Basilica, Toronto
St. Michael's Cathedral redecoration and alterations	Toronto, Ontario	1890	St. Michael's Cathedral (Toronto)
St. Paul's Church	Dornoch, Ontario	1890.	St. Paul Church - Dornoch
St. John the Evangelist Roman Catholic Church	Gananoque, Ontario	1891.	St. John's Catholic Church, Town of Gananoque
St. Gregory the Great Roman Catholic Church	Picton, Ontario	1892	
Church of the Good Thief	Kingston, Ontario	1892	Church of the Good Thief, Kingston
