= James Vincent Cleary =

Canadian Roman Catholic priest (1828–1898)

James Vincent Cleary STD(DD)
- Archbishop of Kingston
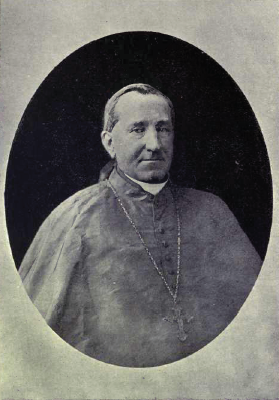
- Church: Roman Catholic Church
- See: Kingston
- In office: 1 October 1880— 24 February 1898
- Predecessor: John O'Brien
- Successor: Charles-Hugues Gauthier

Personal details
- Born: 18 September 1828 Dungarvan, County Waterford, Ireland
- Died: 24 February 1898 (aged 69)
- Education: Maynooth College

James Vincent Cleary (18 September 1828 – 24 February 1898) was a Canadian Roman Catholic priest and Archbishop of Kingston, Ontario.

== Biography ==
Cleary was born on 18 September 1828, in Dungarvan, County Waterford, Ireland, to Thomas and Margaret (nee O'Brien) Cleary. He was educated locally at a classical school. He studied for the priesthood initially in Rome but then at St. Patrick's College, Maynooth, where he was ordained on 19 September 1851. He also studied at Salamanca in Spain before returning to Ireland to become a professor in St. John's College, Waterford, where he also served as president of the college from 1873 to 1876 (his brother Patrick, also a priest, served as the Seminary president as previously). He was awarded the Doctor of Divinity degree(DD or STD), by the Catholic University of Ireland, by public examination, the first recipient of such a degree from the institution. He was appointed vicar general of the Diocese of Waterford and parish priest of Dungarvan in 1876, prior to being named Bishop of Kingston in Ontario. In Canada he oversaw the development of the diocese with the building of over 40 new churches.

He died aged 69 on 24 February 1898 and is buried in Saint Mary's Roman Catholic Cathedral Kingston, Frontenac County, Ontario, Canada.

== Sources ==
- Price, Brian J. (1990). "Cleary, James Vincent". In Halpenny, Francess G. (ed.). Dictionary of Canadian Biography. Vol. XII (1891–1900) (online ed.). University of Toronto Press.
