= St. Mary's Cathedral (Kingston, Ontario) =

Coordinates: 44°13′52″N 76°29′24″W

St. Mary's Cathedral (Cathedral of Saint Mary of the Immaculate Conception)
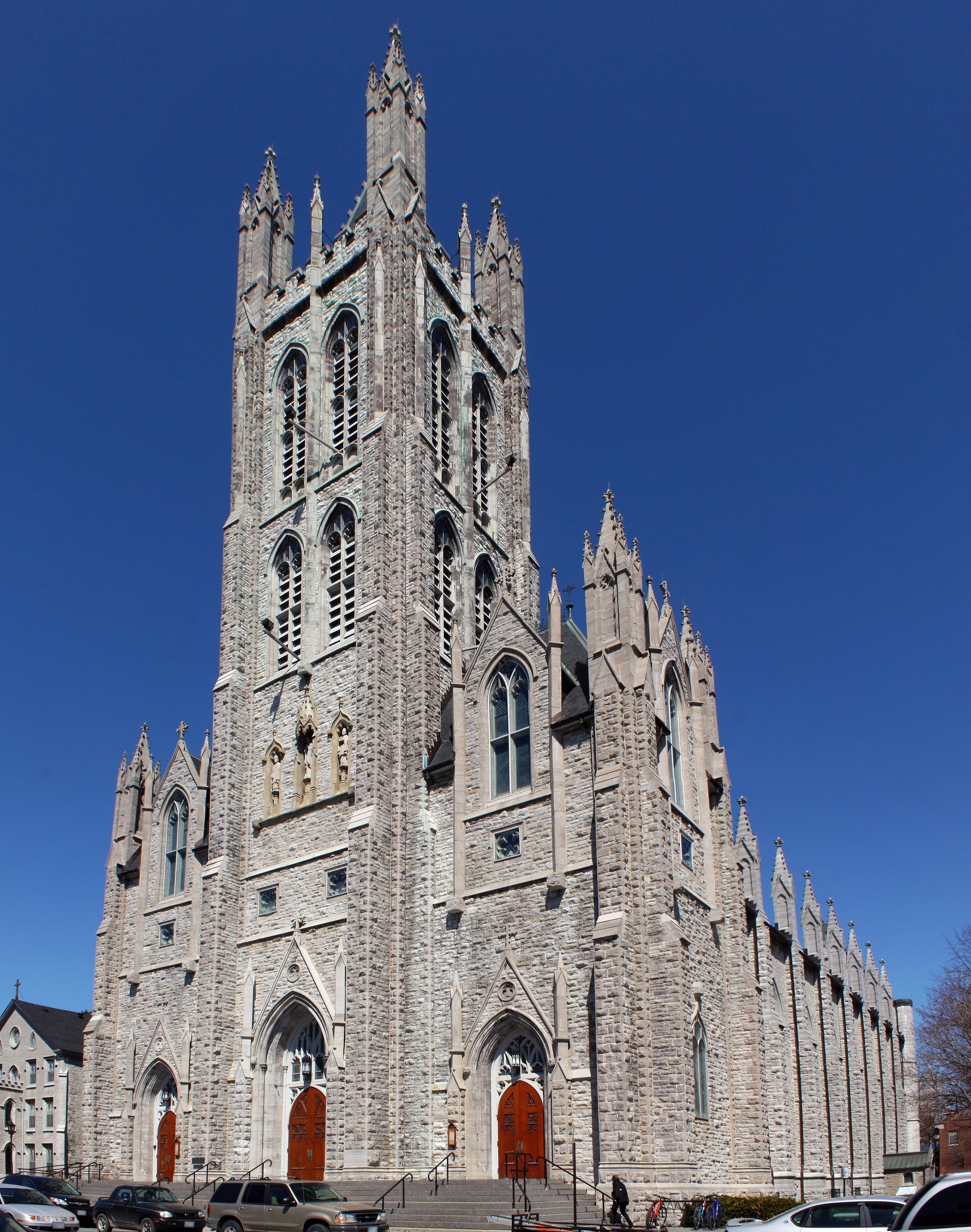
- St. Mary's Cathedral
- St. Mary's Cathedral (Cathedral of Saint Mary of the Immaculate Conception)
- Location: 279 Johnson Street; Kingston, Ontario, Canada; K7L 1Y5
- Denomination: Roman Catholic
- Website: www.stmaryscathedral.ca

History
- Dedication: 1848

Administration
- Province: Kingston
- Archdiocese: Kingston
- Parish: Kingston

St. Mary's Cathedral (or its full name Cathedral of Saint Mary of the Immaculate Conception) in Kingston, Ontario, Canada is a Roman Catholic cathedral. It is one of three churches located within 600m along Clergy Street (the others are Chalmers United Church, and St. Andrew's Presbyterian Church). It is one of two cathedrals in Kingston, the other being the Anglican St. George's Cathedral on King Street.

== History ==
Designed by architect James R. Bowes, construction began in 1842. The cathedral was officially opened October 4, 1848. It was greatly enlarged in 1889 with a design by Joseph Connolly.

The spire rises to a height of 242 feet, and this is believed to be the tallest structure in the entire city of Kingston.

== Renovations ==
Extensive structural renovations were performed between 1987 and 1995, including rebuilding much of the north wall and replacing the 50-year-old asbestos roof (itself a replacement of the original tin roof) with slate tiles. The renovations cost approximately $7,000,000.

== Stained Glass Windows ==
St Mary's Cathedral did not have any stained glass windows until 1885, when they were commissioned as part of the renovations Archbishop James Vincent Cleary was leading.

== Events and Anniversaries ==
The Cathedral has been the location for a number of consecrations for Bishops and Archbishops over the years.

St Mary's Cathedral celebrated its 125th anniversary in 1973.

For the 175th anniversary in 2023, St Mary's held a special Lessons and Carols service. As well, the parish published two books about its stained glass windows: a coloring book, and a coffee table book detailing the windows' history.
