= Dornoch, Ontario =

Village in Ontario, Canada

Coordinates: 44°18′45″N 80°51′25″W

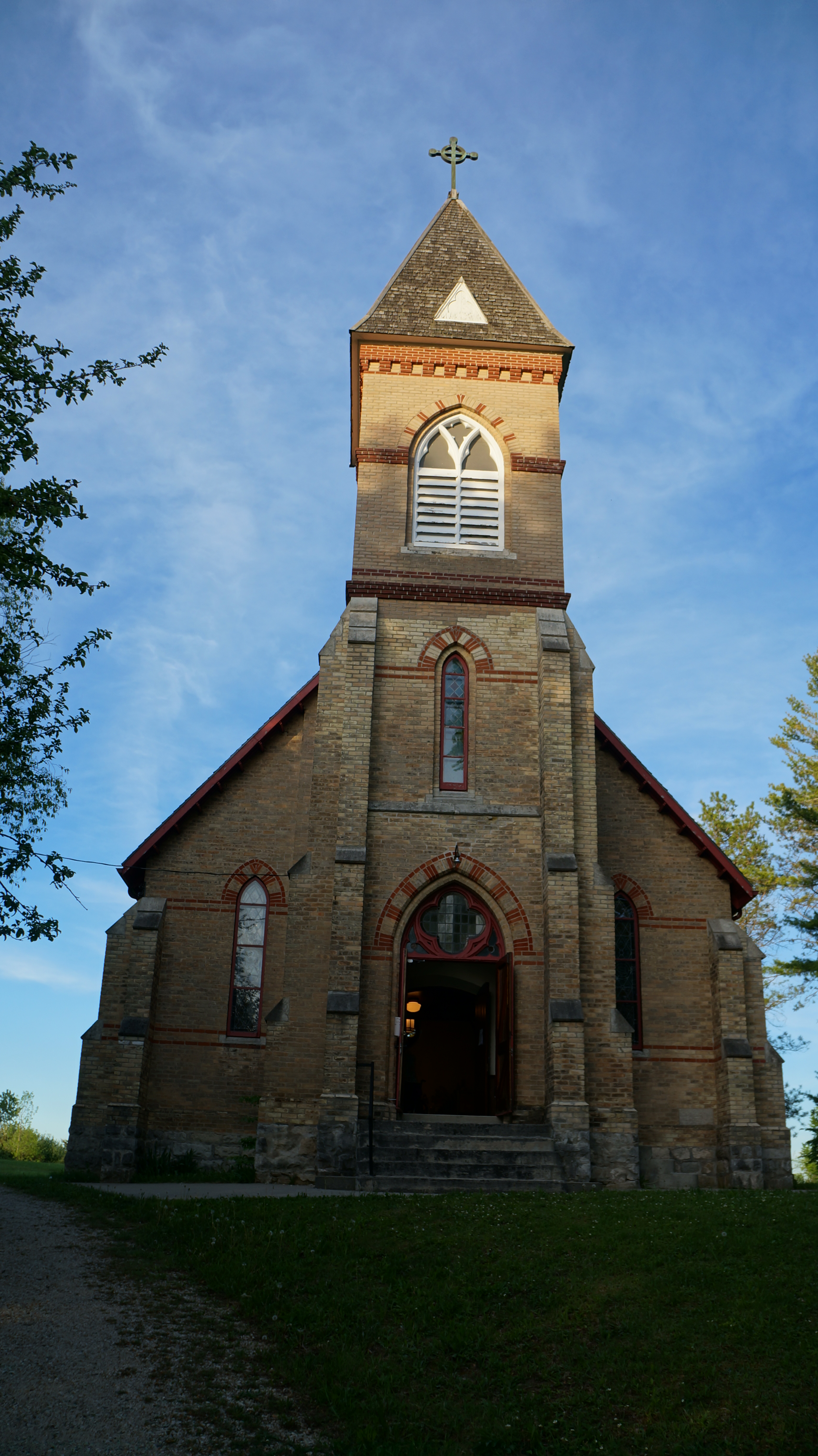
St. Paul Church

The village of Dornoch is located less than 11 kilometers north of the town of Durham on Highway 6 in Grey County, Ontario, Canada. It is part of the municipality of West Grey.

Dornoch was settled by Bartholomew Griffin in 1841. The area was originally called "Griffin's Corners"; it acquired its present name in 1880, when Philip McIntosh renamed it for his father's birthplace in Scotland. Griffin started the first general store. The community centre was built in 1952. Dornoch is situated 11 kilometers south of Williamsford and 33 kilometers south of Owen Sound.

The village is primarily a small farming community on the outskirts of Durham, but does have a convenience store that is known for its photography and ice cream, a community hall that is used for small events as well as the recently rebuilt Dawg House Inn. The community hall was sold to private owners.
