= Goforth =

Goforth may refer to:

== People with the surname ==
- Charles Wayne Goforth (1931–2018), American politician
- D. Bruce Goforth, American politician
- Darren Goforth, US sheriff's deputy shot in 2015
- David Goforth, American Baseball player
- Jonathan Goforth, Canadian Presbyterian missionary
- Ralen Goforth (born 2000), American football player
- Randall Goforth, American football player
- Robert Goforth, American politician
- Rosalind Goforth, Canadian Presbyterian missionary
- Susan Goforth, American actress
- William Goforth (doctor) (1766–1817), American politician
- William Goforth (1731–1807), American politician

== Places ==
- Goforth, Kentucky, an unincorporated community in Kentucky, United States
- Goforth, Texas, a ghost town in Texas, United States

== See also ==
- Go Forth
