= Alexander Topp =

Scottish minister (1814–1879)

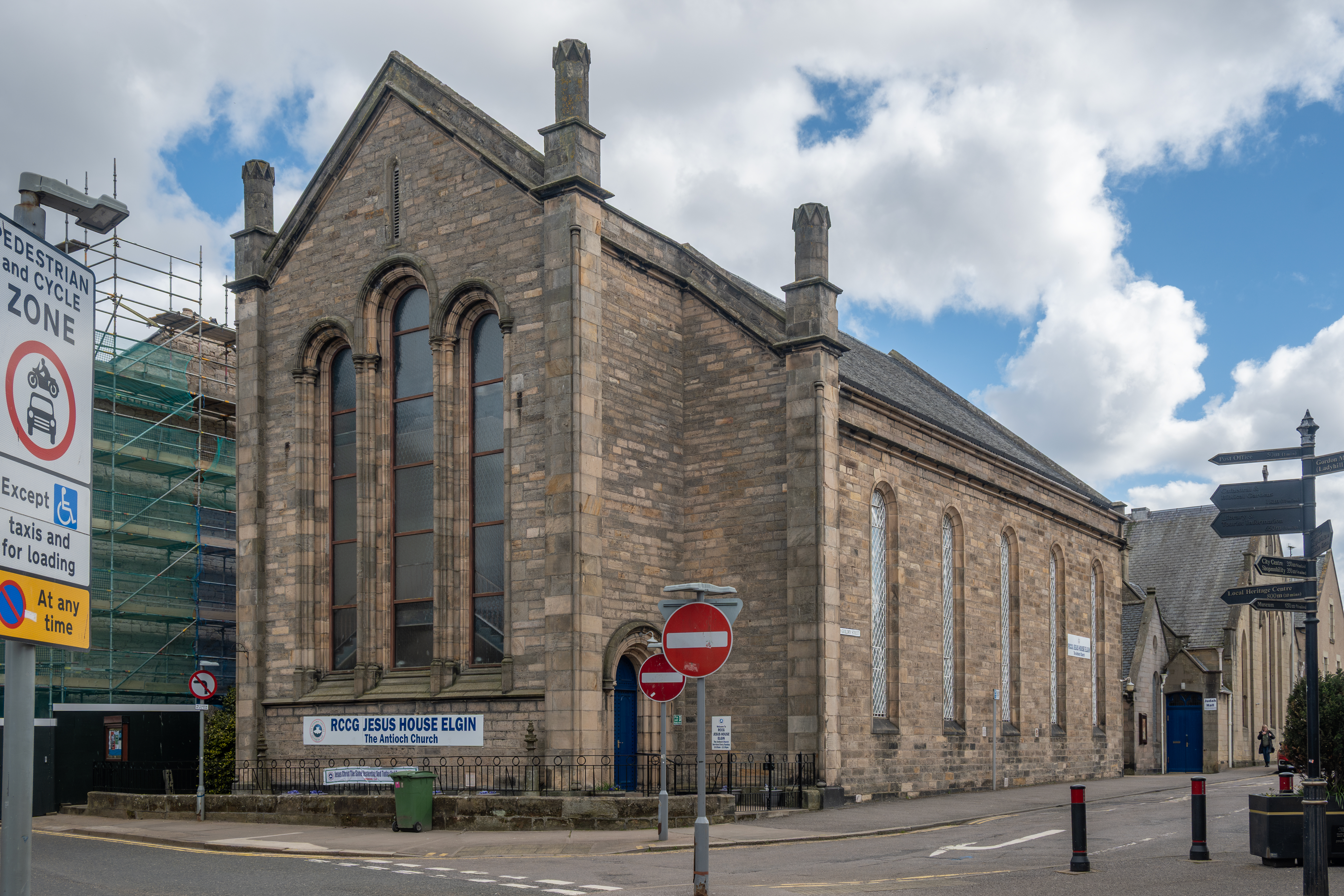
Elgin Free High Kirk - now Elgin High Kirk

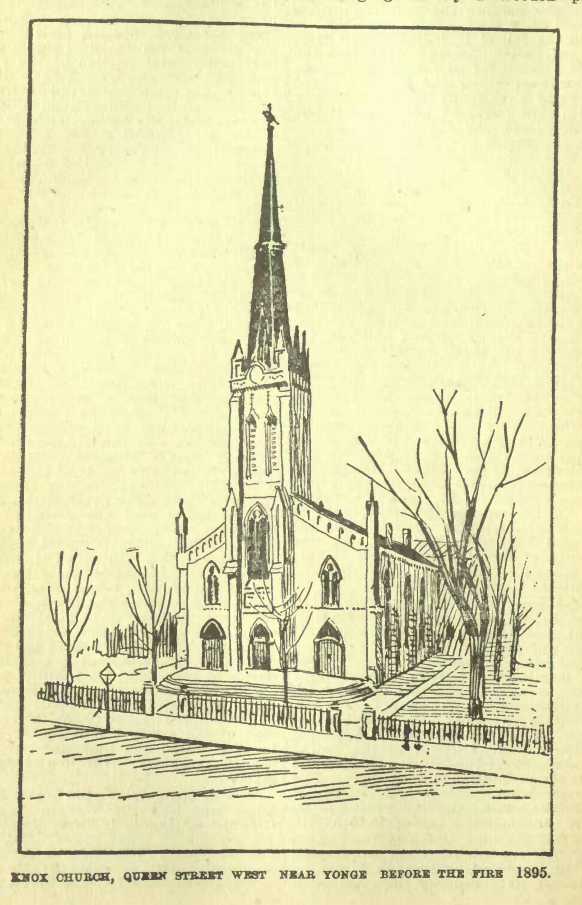
Knox Presbyterian Church in Toronto, before the fire of 1905

Alexander Topp (1 April 1814 – 6 October 1879) was a Scottish minister of the Free Church of Scotland who emigrated to Canada and twice served as Moderator of the General Assembly of the Presbyterian Church in Canada, or more accurately, the Synod of the Canada Presbyterian Church (1868), and then the Presbyterian Church in Canada (1876, the Second General Assembly).

== Biography ==
He was born at Sheriffmill near Elgin, on 1 April 1814, the second of three sons in a family of six. He was educated at Elgin Academy then studied Divinity at King's College, Aberdeen where he graduated MA in 1831. He was ordained by the Church of Scotland at the High Church in Elgin in 1838 having assisted at the church since 1836.

He left the established church in the Disruption of 1843 and created the Free High Church of Elgin. In 1852, he was translated to the Free Roxburgh Church in Edinburgh. In 1858, he emigrated to Canada to serve in the Knox Church, Toronto, following the departure of Rev. Dr. Robert Burns in 1857. He remained there until his death, during a time of great growth and transition in Toronto, Ontario, Canada, and in the Presbyterian Church.

In 1861, there was a Union in the Presbyterian Church of Canada (Free Church) with the United Presbyterian Church (United Associate Canada Synod) into the Canada Presbyterian Church, 1861-75. He was unanimously elected Moderator of the Synod of the Canada Presbyterian Church in 1868, the year following Canada's Confederation. From 1870 to 1875, he worked on the union of four Canadian Presbyterian groups to create the PCC in June 1875, serving as Secretary. He was Moderator of the new church in 1876.

He was a Governor of Knox College, Toronto. He was a joint founder of the Presbyterian College, Montreal, in 1865, and in 1871 helped to found the Manitoba College in Old Kildonan in Manitoba. From 1874 to 1879, he served on the management of the Toronto Home for Incurables. From 1866 to 1870, he served the Toronto Home of Industry.

He died in Toronto on 6 October 1879, aged 65. He is buried in Toronto's Mount Pleasant Cemetery.

== Family ==
In 1848, he married Jane Mortimer (1815-1895), widow of John Clark (1812-1839), both of Aberdeen. Their only son died in Scotland in 1853.(according to Dictionary of Canadian Biography) A daughter, Agnes Mortimer Topp Alexander, died in Toronto in May 1935. His stepson, her son, Sir William Mortimer Clark, arrived in Toronto the year following their arrival, and was active in Knox Church. He became the 9th Lieutenant Governor of Ontario, serving from 1903-1908, and chaired the Board of Knox College, Toronto, from 1880, (succeeded his step-father after Professor Proudfoot assumed the chair) until his death in August 1917.
