= Fort Massey United Church =

Church in Halifax, Nova Scotia, Canada

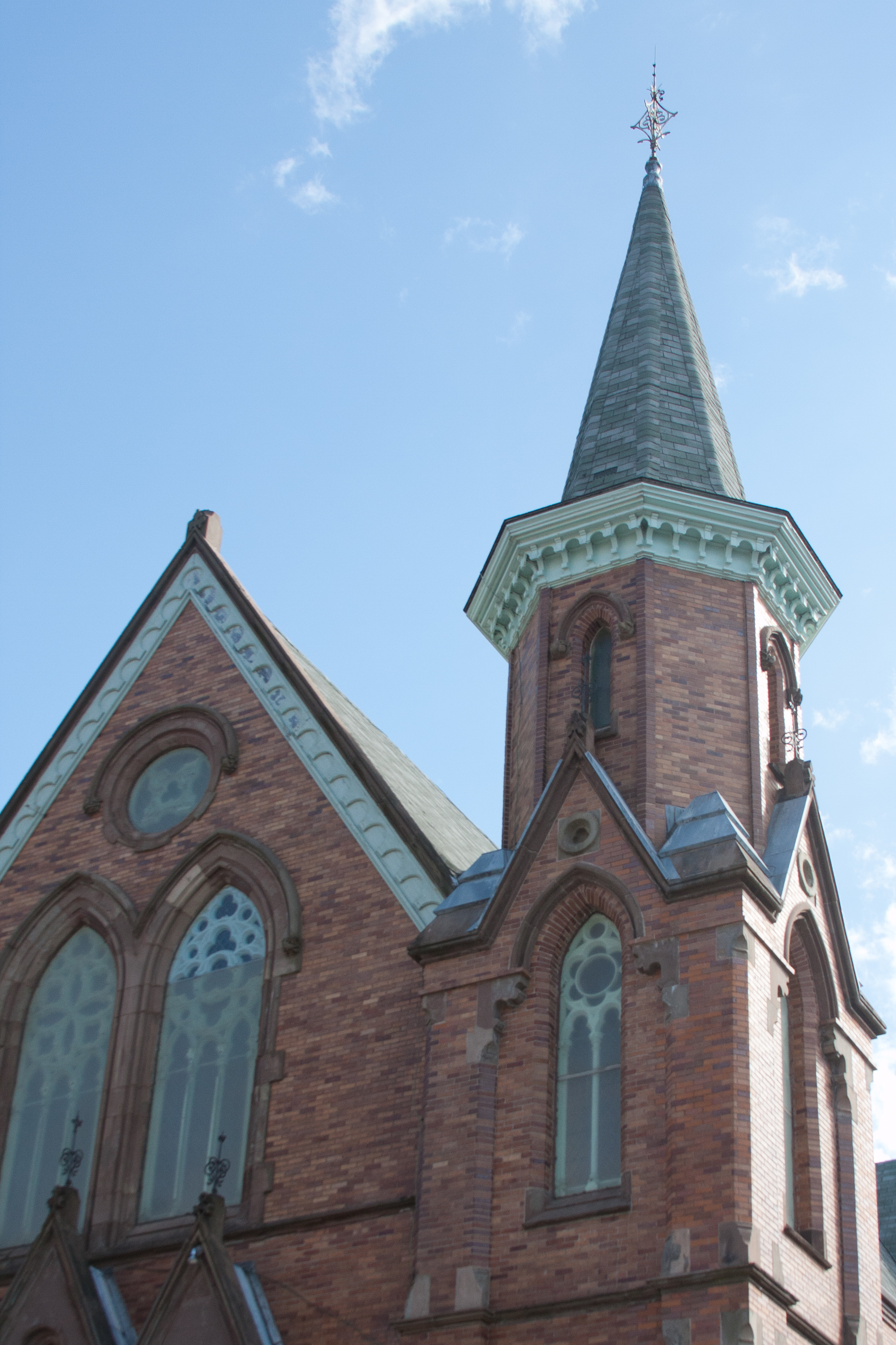
- Fort Massey United Church
- 44°38′20″N 63°34′24″W
- Location: Halifax, Nova Scotia
- Country: Canada
- Denomination: United Church of Canada

History
- Founded: 25 June 1870

Architecture
- Architect: David Stirling
- Style: Gothic Revival
- Completed: 10 December 1871

Fort Massey United Church, formerly Fort Massey Presbyterian Church, is a United Church of Canada church in Halifax, Nova Scotia.

== History ==
First known as the Fort Massey Presbyterian Church, it was formed as part of the Presbytery of Halifax within the Presbyterian Church in Canada. The Trustees of Fort Massey Presbyterian Church, Halifax were incorporated under an act passed on 4 April 1871. The act established Robert Boak, William James Stairs, Peter Ross, and John S. McLean, along with their successors, as a corporate body responsible for managing the church's property. The trustees were authorized to collect arrears, acquire and dispose of real estate up to a value of $60,000, and construct buildings for worship, a manse, and other ecclesiastical purposes.

The church building was erected on the site of the former blockhouse of Maj. Gen. Eyre Massey. It was designed by Scottish architect David Stirling during his partnership with Andrew Dewar. Stirling's Early Gothic Revival style influenced the building's design. Located at the corner of Queen and Tobin streets, it was built for $42,000. John Brookfield began construction of the building, which was later finished by his son, Samuel Manners Brookfield. The church cornerstone was laid on 25 June 1870 in Halifax, Nova Scotia, and the building officially opened on 10 December 1871.

Rev. James K. Smith was transferred from Galt, Ontario, to Fort Massey Church on 31 October 1872. In 1873, Rev. Smith officiated a short service for the Hon. Joseph Howe before his relatives and immediate personal friends after his death. Fort Massey's second minister, Rev. Robert Ferrier Burns (son of Robert Burns), took charge on 18 March 1875. He succeeded Rev. J.K. Smith as the pastor of the congregation. He served in the role at the church for 11 years. By the 1880s, Fort Massey had adopted the "free will offering" system, with families contributing $100 per household to church-related causes.

In 1909, a stained-glass window honoring John F. Stairs was placed in Fort Massey Church that was donated by his widow and children.

The Fort Massey Presbyterian congregation voted to unite with the Methodist and Congregationalist churches in forming the United Church of Canada in 1925.

The church building became a provincially registered property in Nova Scotia on 9 December 1996.

== Ministers ==
- Rev. J.K. Smith (1872-1874)
- Rev. Robert Ferrier Burns (1875-1892)
- Rev. Alfred Gandier (1893-1900)
- Rev. James William Falconer (1902-1907)
- Rev. Roger William Ross (1908-1926)
- Rev. John Mutch (1927-1932)
- Rev. Norrie Anderson (1933-1940)
- Rev. Gerald F. Rogers (1941-1947)
- Rev. Donald M. Sinclair (1948-1969)
- Rev. Stanley MacQueen

== See also ==
- List of historic places in Halifax, Nova Scotia
