= Timothy Houghton =

Timothy Houghton (21 August 1727 – 10 May 1780) was the founder of Chester, Nova Scotia (1759). In the wake of the American patriot rebellion in the Siege of Fort Cumberland during the American Revolution, while Chief magistrate and Justice of the Peace for the Chester township, he was jailed for betraying the Loyalist cause. Among other crimes, he was accused of helping American privateer prisoners escape back to Boston. According to historian Barry Cahill, this trial was the most important court proceedings against a New England Planter patriot along Nova Scotia’s South Shore, which included the Townships of Liverpool, Yarmouth and Barrington. One of his four accusers was John Umlach of the Royal Nova Scotia Volunteer Regiment. Through the trials for sedition, the Nova Scotia (Loyalist) government at Halifax was able to establish the “legal repression and the general criminalization of political dissent.” Houghton's trial was only one of two in the province (John Frost (minister) was the other) that were successfully prosecuted.

== Career ==
Houghton was born in Bolton, Massachusetts. During the French and Indian War, from April to November, 1754, he served on the eastern frontier in Col. John Winslow's regiment. In the Crown Point expedition, Aug. 9, 1755, he was adjutant in Col. Samuel Willard's regiment. In 1756 he led a company largely recruited by his lieutenant from Walton, Mass.

Joining the migration of New England Planters into Nova Scotia, Timothy Houghton and Eunice Whitcomb left Boston, Massachusetts, on 30 July 1759 and arrived in Chester, Nova Scotia, on 4 August.3. Houghton along with Reverend John Seccombe founded the Chester Township.

During the American Revolution, Timothy Houghton was sentenced to six months in jail for seditious statements about the King. The foreman of the grand jury that indicted Houghton was John George Pyke. He served two months of his sentence and was released on 10 February 1777. (Rev. John Seccombe was arraigned but never prosecuted, undoubtedly due to his popularity.) Houghton died on 10 May 1780 at Halifax, Nova Scotia, at age 52, of small-pox.

== See also ==
Nova Scotia in the American Revolution
