= Robert Burns (theologian) =

Scottish Presbyterian minister and professor in Toronto (1789–1869)

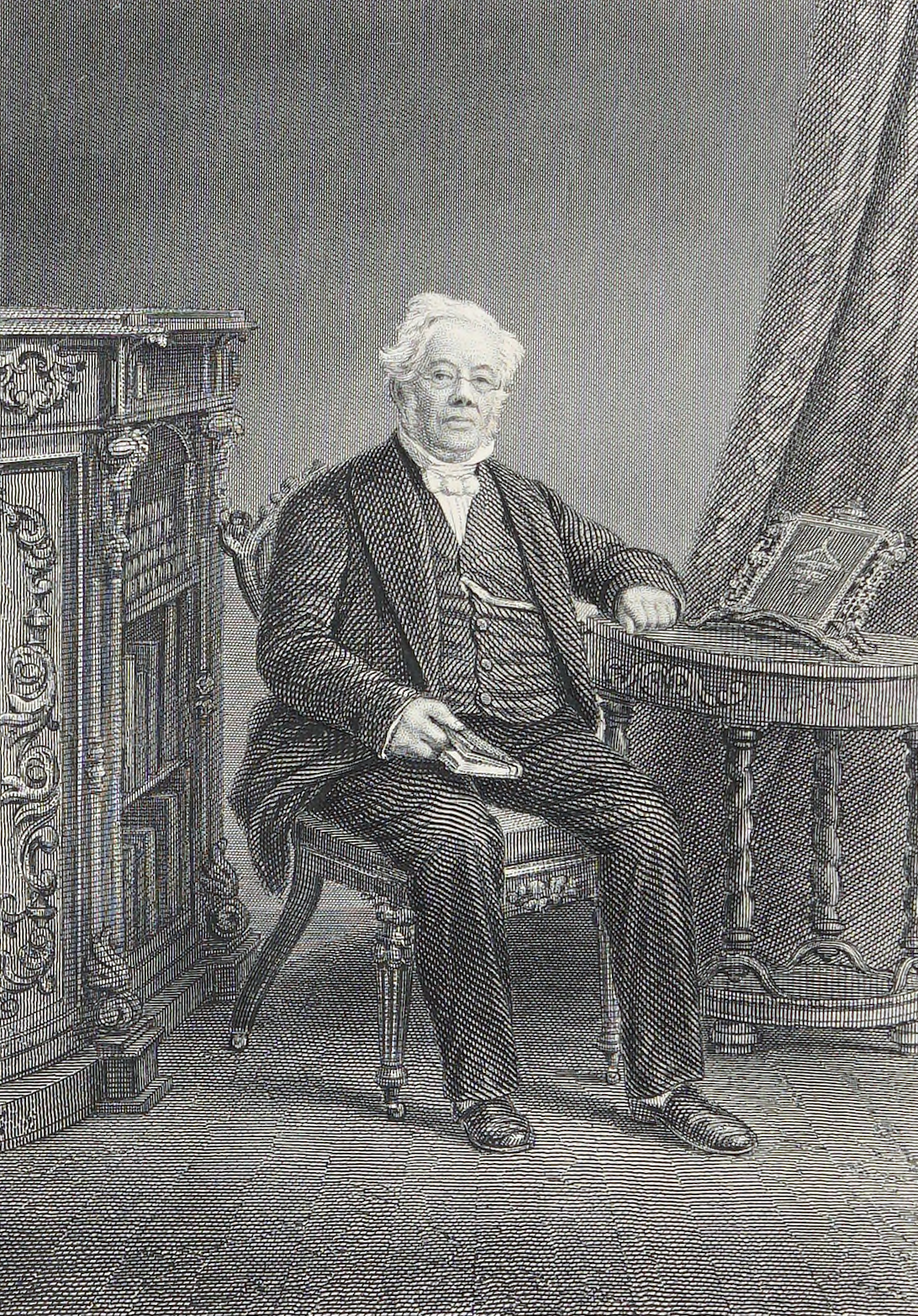

Personal details
- Born: 1789 Scotland
- Died: 1869 (aged 79–80) Canada
- Denomination: (1) Church of Scotland (2) Free Church (3) Presbyterian Church in Canada

Robert Burns (1789–1869) was a Scottish preacher, church leader, teacher and theological writer. He served with the Church of Scotland, Free Church of Scotland and the Presbyterian Church, and worked in Scotland, the US and Canada.

== Biography ==
Burns was born at Bo'ness in 1789. His father was a merchant, and a devout Christian, who saw four of his sons become ministers in the Church of Scotland.

He was educated at the University of Edinburgh, licensed as a probationer of the Church of Scotland in 1810, and ordained minister of the Low church, Paisley, in 1811. He was appointed to preach at Laigh Kirk in Paisley, and served there until 1843.

He was an energetic and active man, a preacher, a dedicated worker in his parish and town, a supporter of the evangelical party in the church, and one of the opponents of lay patronage.

At the time there was mass emmigration from Scotland, especially to North America; impressed with the spiritual wants of his countrymen in the colonies, he helped to form a colonial society for supplying them with ministers.

In 1843 he joined the new Free Church of Scotland and the following year, the general assembly sent him to the United States, to cultivate fraternal relations with the churches there. In 1845 he accepted an invitation to be minister of Knox Presbyterian Church (Toronto), in which charge he remained till 1856, when he was appointed professor of church history and apologetics in Knox College (Toronto), a theological institution of the Presbyterian church.

Burns took a most lively interest in his church, moving about with great activity over the whole colony, and becoming acquainted with almost every congregation. He died in 1869.

== Works ==
He was the author of several works. These include A Historical Dissertation on the Law and Practice of Great Britain with regard to the Poor (1819), On Pluralities (1824), The Gareloch Heresy tried (1830), Life of Stevenson Macgill, D.D. (1842). Besides writing these works, he edited in 1828 a new edition of Wodrow's History of the Sufferings of the Church of Scotland, from the Restoration to the Revolution, in 4 volumes, contributing a life of the author.

For three years (1838–1840) he edited and contributed many papers to the Edinburgh Christian Instructor. This had been a powerful organ of the evangelical party in the church when edited by Andrew Mitchell Thomson.

- An Essay on the Office and Duties of the Eldership in the Church of Scotland (Paisley, 1818)
- Historical Dissertations on the Law and Practice of Great Britain, and particularly of Scotland, with regard to the Poor (Edinburgh, 1819)
- Plurality of Offices in the Church of Scotland Examined (Glasgow, 1824)
- Three Letters to a Friend on the Moral Bearings of the Bible Society Controversy (Edinburgh, 1827)
- The Gareloch Heresy tried (1830)
- Memoir of the Rev. Stevenson M'Gill, D. D. (Edinburgh, 1842) [vide Plagiarisms of Rev. Dr R. Burns, one of the Ministers of Paisley, detected and exposed (Edinburgh, 1842)].
- He edited a new edition of Robert Wodrow's History of the Sufferings of the Church of Scotland, 4 vols. (Glasgow, 1828–1831), contributing a Memoir of the author; and for three years (1838–1840) he edited, and wrote many papers in, the Edinburgh Christian Instructor.

== Family ==
Burns was married twice;

- (1) On 8 July 1814, he married Janet (died 14 November 1841), daughter of John Orr, manufacturer, Paisley, and they had seven children —
  - Agnes, born 22 April 1816, died 1 January 1820
  - John, born 30 July 1819, died 29 January 1820
  - John Orr, born 4 January 1821, died 13 July 1831
  - Robert, born 4 August 1822, died 2 January 1823
  - James Orr, born 2 November 1823, student at University of Glasgow in 1840
  - Robert Ferrier, D. D., minister of Chalmers Presbyterian Church, Kingston, Canada, 1847–1855, Knox Church, St Catherine's, Canada, 1855–1867, Scots Church, Chicago, 1867–1870, Cote Street Church, Montreal, 1870–1875, Fort Massey Presbyterian Church, Halifax, Nova Scotia, 1875, born 23 December 1826, died at Broughty Ferry, 5 April 1896
  - William, born 16 August 1831
- (2) On 12 December 1844, he married Elizabeth Bell (died 22 August 1882), daughter of Thomson Bonar of Grove; they had no children.
