= David Stirling (architect) =

Scottish-Canadian architect (1822–1887)

- Born: 6 December 1822; Galashiels, Scotland
- Died: 13 April 1887 (aged 64); Charlottetown, Prince Edward Island, Canada
- Occupation: Architect
- Practice: Dominion architect for the federal works in Nova Scotia
- Buildings: MacLennan House, Convocation Hall, King's-Edgehill School

David Stirling RCA (6 December 1822 - 13 April 1887) was a Canadian architect of Scottish birth. In 1872 he was made Dominion architect for the federal works in Nova Scotia and in 1880 he became one of the first associate architects of the Royal Canadian Academy of Arts.

Born in Galashiels, Stirling was the son of stonemason James Stirling. After training as an architect in his native country, he emigrated to St. John's, Newfoundland in 1847, where he played a major role in rebuilding portions of the town destroyed by fire the previous year. He spent the next 35 years designing and building a wide array of buildings out of practices in Charlottetown, Halifax, and Toronto. Having never retired, he died in Charlottetown in 1887 at the age of 64.

== Selected works ==
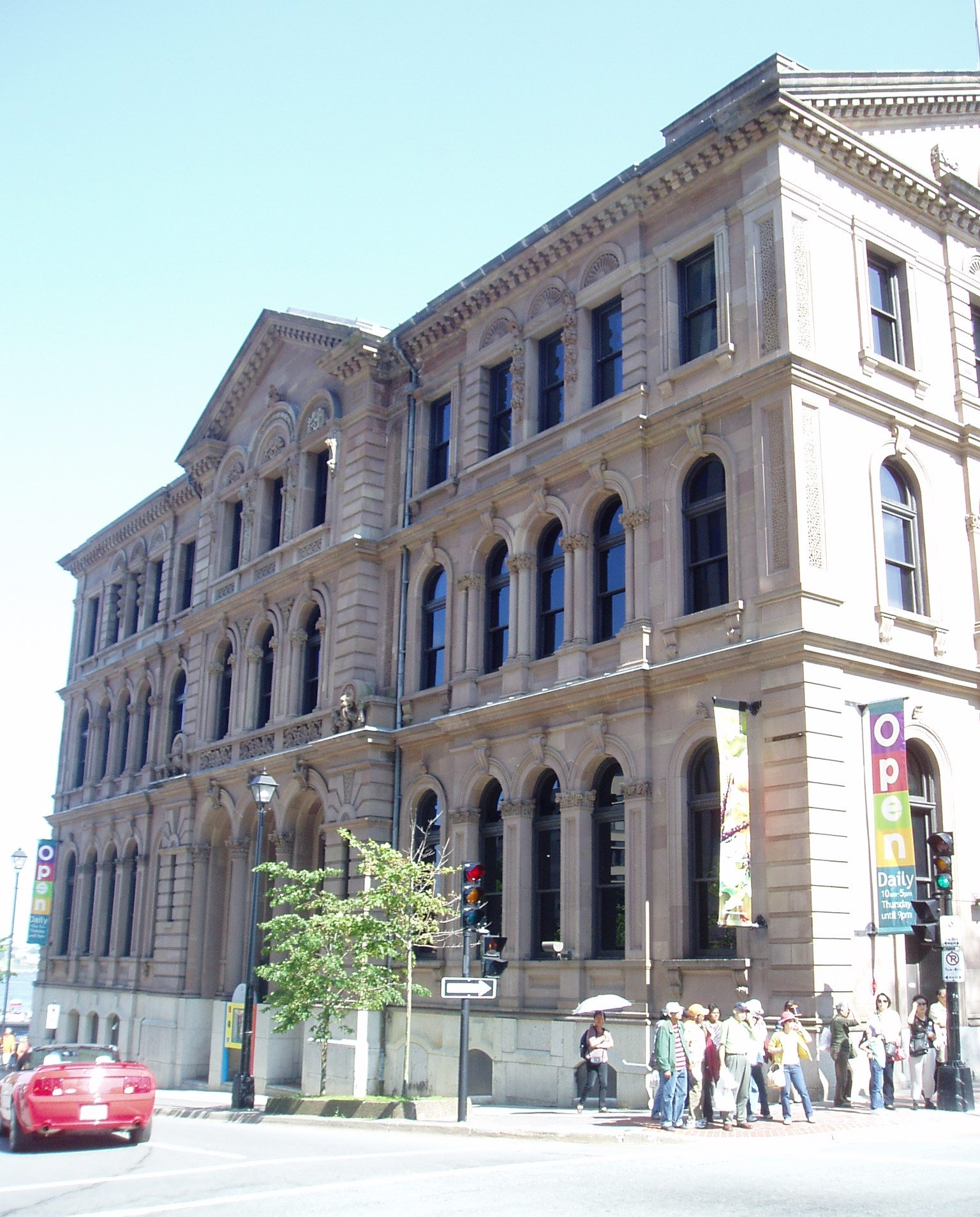
The Dominion Building in Halifax, Nova Scotia was designed by David Stirling and constructed between 1863 and 1868. It serves today as the Art Gallery of Nova Scotia

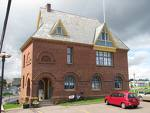
Garden of the Gulf Museum, Montague (originally the Montague Post Office and Customs House, built 1887–1888); Prince Edward Island

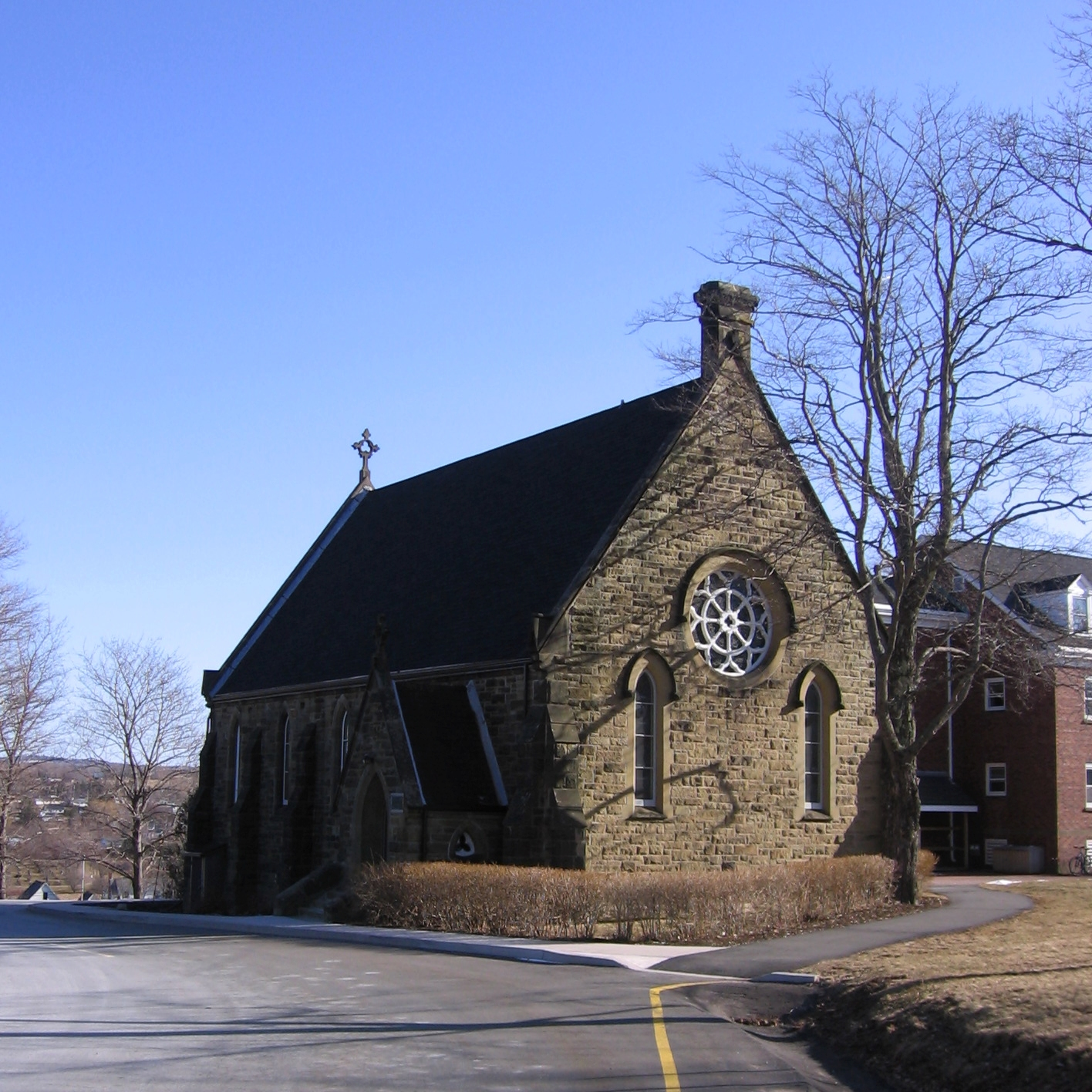
Hensley Chapel, King's College, Windsor, NS, designed by David Stirling and William Critchlow Harris

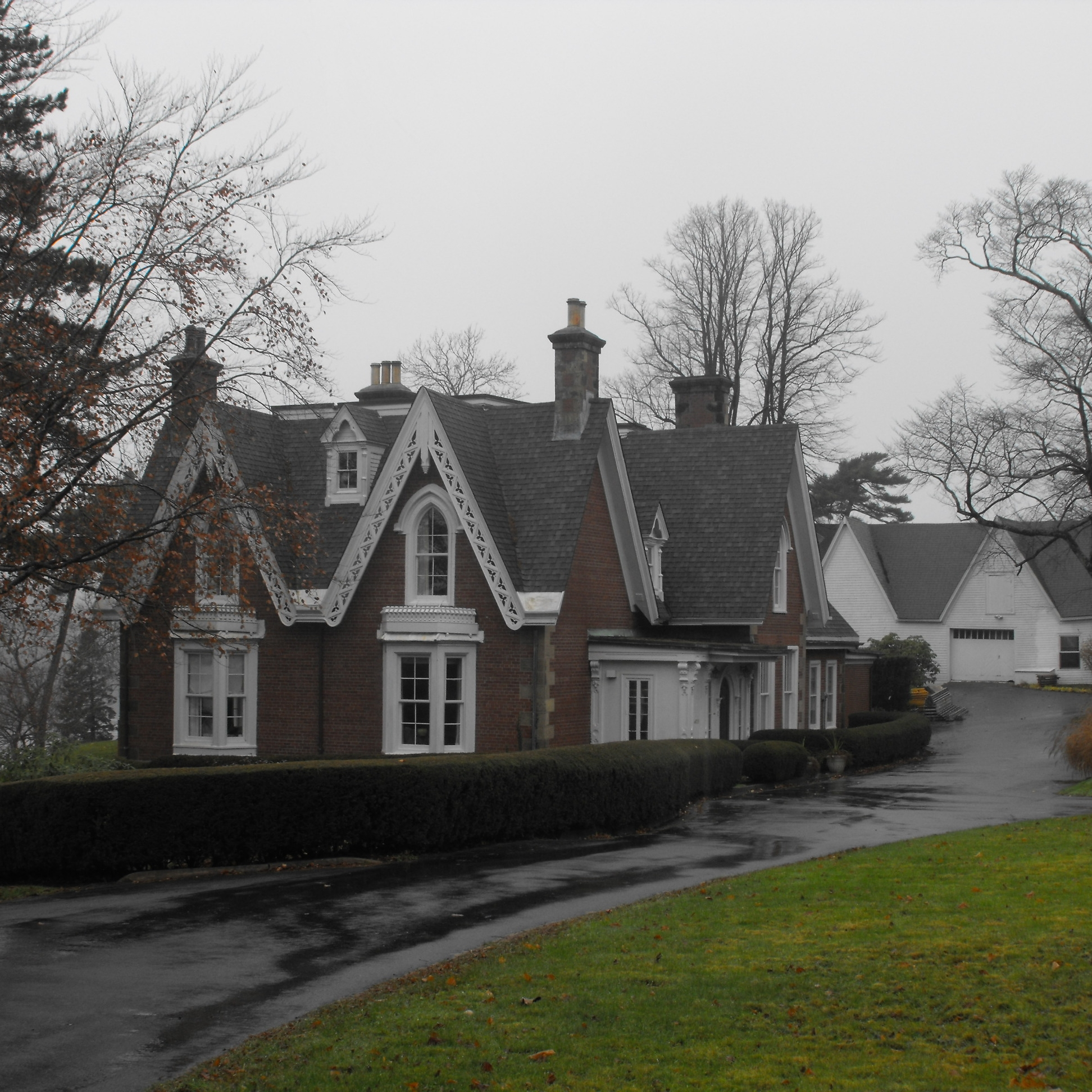
Fernwood, Halifax (built 1860)
- Pictou County Court House (1855)
- Fernwood, Halifax (1860)
- Halifax Club (1862)
- Library and Museum at King's College, (1862–63); Chapel, (1877), Windsor, Nova Scotia (by Stirling & Dewar)
- Alexander Keith's residence (1863)
- He built the first South Street Poor House (1869) in Halifax after going to the states to get ideas. It had a fireproof arch which was subsequently, and without his permission, penetrated by not only an elevator but also by unsealed pipe holes. A fire broke out in the basement that destroyed the Poor House on November 6–7, 1882. 33 patients were trapped in the fifth-floor hospital and died.
- Hyndman Building, 57 Queen Street, Charlottetown (originally the Victoria Building, 1866)
- Custom House, 40 Great George Street, Charlottetown (originally the Bank of Prince Edward Island, built 1867–1868)
- Presbyterian Church of St. David, Halifax (originally the Grafton Street Methodist Church, built 1868–1869)
- Fort Massey United Church, Halifax (1870)
- St. Matthew's Manse, Halifax (1874)
- Kirk of St. James Presbyterian Church, Charlottetown (1877)
- Falconwood Insane Asylum / Hospital, Charlottetown (built 1877–1879)
- H.H. Houle House, 96-98 Prince Street, Charlottetown (1879)
- South Shore United Church, Tryon (1880)
- Summerside City Hall, Summerside (originally the Summerside Post Office, built from 1883 to 1886)
- MacLennan House, 235-237 Prince Street, Charlottetown (1886)
- Convocation Hall, King's-Edgehill School (1861)

== External ==
- Historic places in Canada
- "David Stirling". Dictionary of Canadian Biography (online ed.). University of Toronto Press. 1979–2016.
