= Chester, Nova Scotia =

Town on the South Shore of Nova Scotia

Chester
- Village
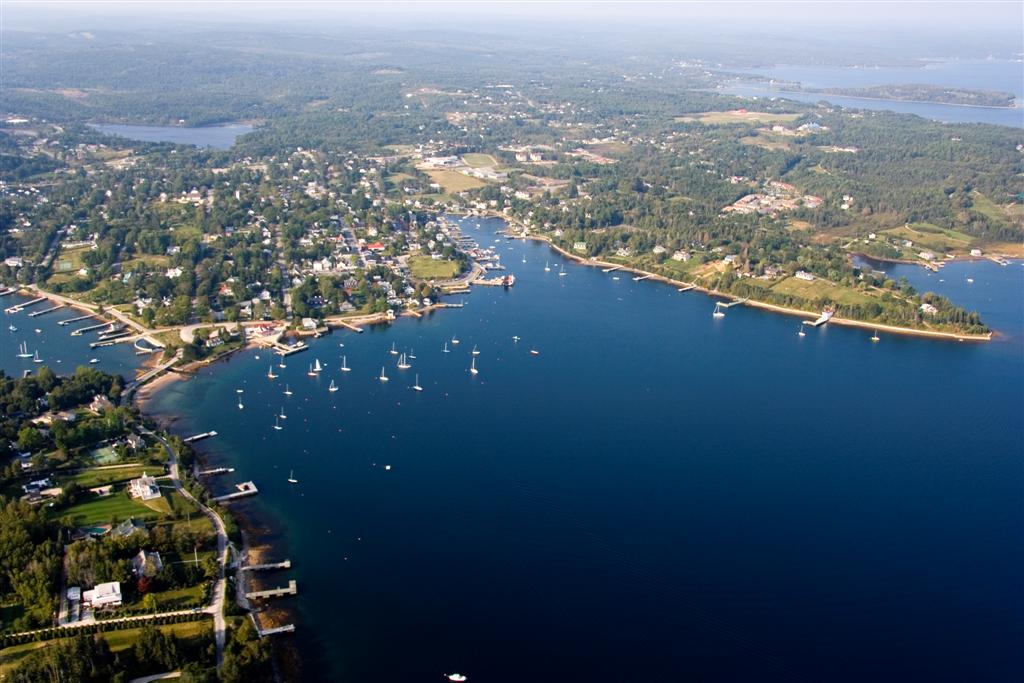
- Motto: A Progressive Community
- Location of Chester in Nova Scotia
- Coordinates: 44°32′25″N 64°14′23″W
- Country: Canada
- Province: Nova Scotia
- County: Lunenburg County.
- Municipality: Chester Municipal District
- Founded: 1759
- Incorporated: 1963

Government
  - Type: Village Commission
  - Chair: Nancy Hatch
  - Chief Administrative Officer: Dan McDougall

Area
  - Village: 8.305 km^{2} (3.207 sq mi)
- Elevation: 17 m (56 ft)

Population (2011)
  - Urban: 2,348
- Time zone: UTC-4 (AST)
  - Summer (DST): UTC-3 (ADT)
- Postal code: B0J 1J0
- Area code: 902
- Telephone Exchanges: 273 275 277 279 299 980
- NTS Map: 21A9 Chester
- GNBC Code: CAGYN
- Website: chester.ca
- Part of a series about Places in Nova Scotia

Chester is a village on the Chester Peninsula, Mahone Bay, Nova Scotia, Canada.

== History ==
The French had been present in Acadia since the early 1600s, but when the British expanded into the area in the 1700s, Acadian settlements on the South Shore were few and tiny. After the Expulsion of the Acadians the British wanted to repopulate vacated lands, and offered land grants to colonists from New England, which was experiencing a population explosion. In 1761, led by founders Timothy Houghton and Rev. John Seccombe, New England Planters were granted lands in the Chester area, then called Shoreham.

During the American Revolution, Nova Scotia was invaded regularly by American Revolutionary forces and privateers, including the 1782 Raid on Chester. During this time some of the New England immigrants proved to be neither neutral nor loyal in the conflict, including founders Timothy Houghton and John Seccombe against whom criminal charges were brought for sedition. Military officer Jonathan Prescott was also suspected of being an American Patriot sympathizer.

During the 1800s Chester was an important site for coastal commerce, with economic activities including lumbering, shipbuilding, shipping, and fishing. During the War of 1812, the American privateer Young Teazer was trapped off the shores of Chester. To avoid capture, a crew member scuttled the ship, killing most of the crew.

In 1922 a statue was erected in memory of 54 soldiers from the area who were killed in World War I, cast by Scottish sculptor J. Massey Rhind. After the war the Women's Institute of Nova Scotia established the Zoé Vallé Memorial Library.

In 2002 it was proposed to incorporate Chester as a town, thereby leaving the Chester Municipal District. Many residents fought the motion and won the right to a plebiscite, which led to the defeat of the motion in February 2003.

== Schools ==
Chester has an elementary school, Chester District School (grades Primary–5) and a middle school, Chester Area Middle School or CAMS as it is known (grades 6–8). Forest Heights Community School brings together students from all of the Municipality of the District of Chester and Tancook Island for grades 9–12.

== Culture ==
The Chester Playhouse, is a charitable organization for the promotion of performing arts. The building is a cinema built in 1939 and converted in 1963. In 1987 the building was purchased by Christopher Ondaatje, who donated it to the Theatre Council. Its capacity is 176. The theatre has a year-round program with a variety of performance types, including local folk musician Old Man Luedecke.

The Chester and Area Family Resource Centre provides support to new parents.

Chester was a filming site for the TV series Haven and for parts of The Curse of Oak Island.

Founded in 1873 and incorporated in 1906, the Chester Brass Band is a British-style brass ensemble based in Chester, Nova Scotia. The band is a non-profit volunteer organization, funded wholly by its membership, concert series, and local patrons. The Chester Brass Band's repertoire includes classical works, marches, hymns, popular melodies and original works written or arranged specifically for brass band. The band also includes smaller subgroups: a Dixieland band, stage band and small brass ensembles. The band has performed around Nova Scotia and across the world, often accompanying guest choirs, vocalists and instrumental soloists of distinction. On five occasions, Chester Brass was a top-three finisher at the International Brass Band Championships.

== Attractions and recreation ==
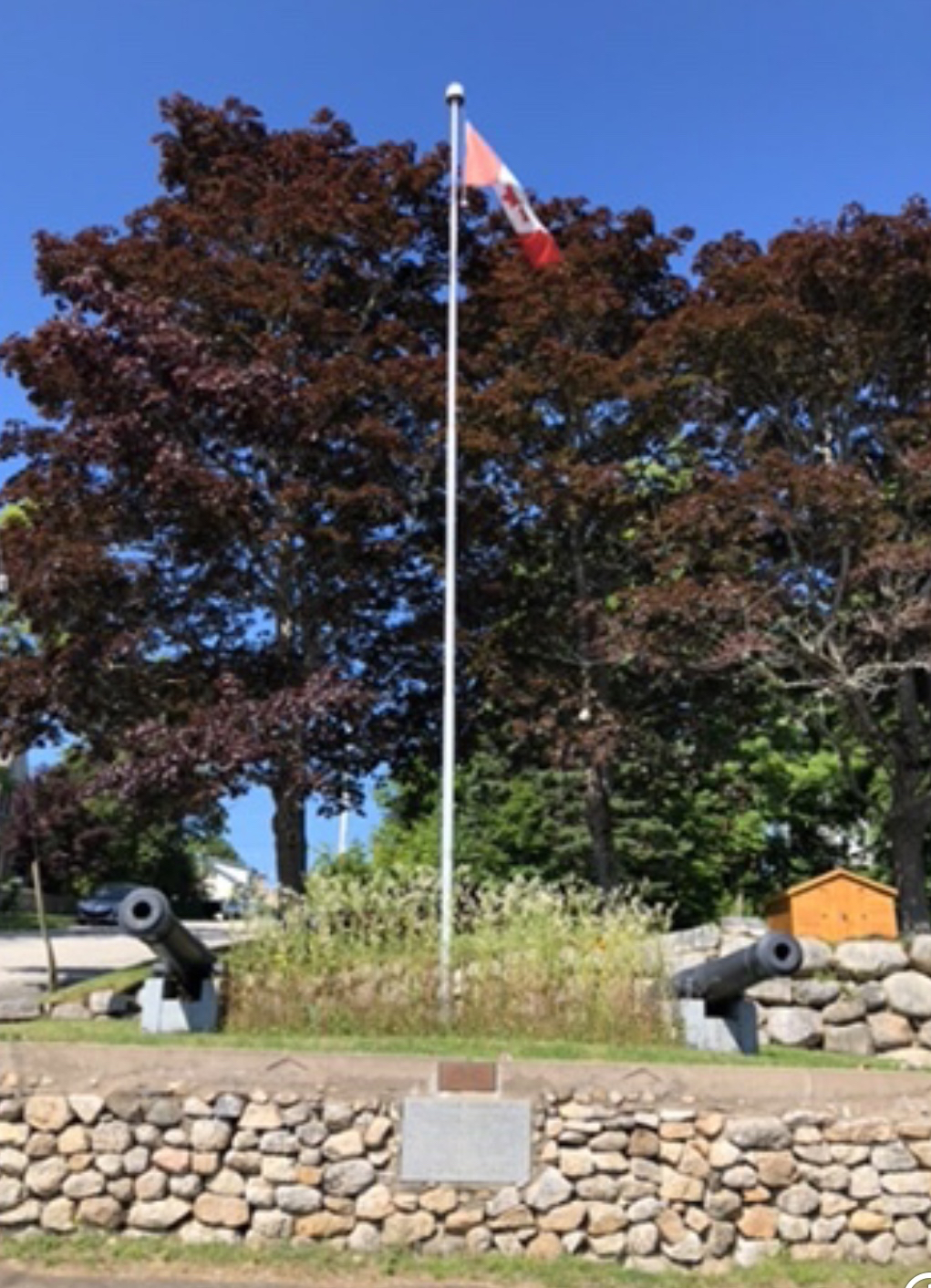
Chester Blockhouse Cannons, Chester Legion (1782)

There are a number of public boat launch sites around Mahone Bay. The waters are fine for kayaking and sailing. The Chester Yacht Club hosts Chester Race Week, where keelboats from all over the eastern coast of North America compete during the second week of August.

For walkers and cyclists there is also the Chester Connector which is a municipal operated section of the previous rail line and which is shared with motorized recreational vehicles. In the last weekend of July there is the annual Chester Garden Show and the House and Garden Tour along with harbour tours. Also that weekend is the Bonnie Lea Lobster benefit.

The Chester Municipal Heritage Society operates the Lordly House Museum and children's playground, they host an annual Antique Auction in early July, and an Annual House and Boat Tour after Race week, a Christmas Craft Fair and at the Train Station circa 1905 is an Oak Island Display and Visitors Information office. Winter is a time for events including "Sing! Choirs" in December and February's "Coldest Day of the Year", the Chester Drama Society fundraiser.

Chester Golf Club on the eastern side of the front harbour has 18 holes and views of the harbour.

"The Park" The Church Memorial Park is home to the Chester Tennis Club, Eleanor Pew Memorial Rink and Chester Curling Club, home club of curler Mary Fay (2016 Youth Olympics Gold Medal Winner and 2016 World Junior Curling Championship Champion).

== Notable people ==
- Desmond Piers: (1913–2005) naval officer, retired to Chester
- Donald Hebb: (1904–1985) psychologist, born and lived in Chester until age 16
- Summer or secondary residents are businessmen Christopher Ondaatje and John Risley
- Old Man Luedecke, folk musician
- John Seccombe
