= First Presbyterian Church (Edmonton) =

Church in Edmonton, Alberta, Canada

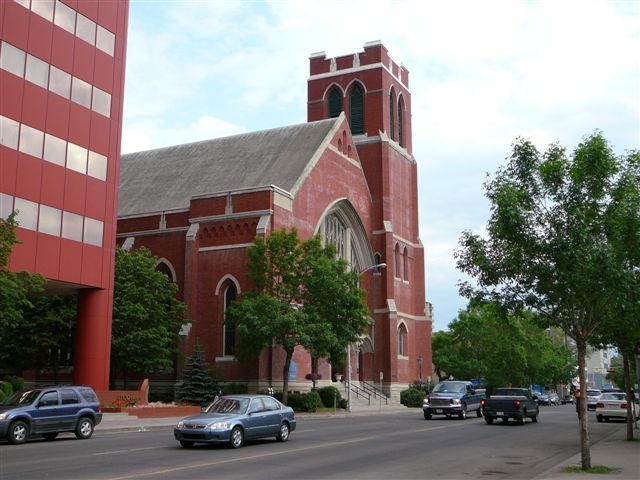

Religion
- Affiliation: Presbyterian Church in Canada
- Ecclesiastical or organisational status: Church

Location
- Location: 10025 105 Street NW; Edmonton, Alberta; T5J 1C8
- Interactive map of First Presbyterian Church
- Coordinates: 53°32′23″N 113°30′03″W

Architecture
- Architects: Wilson and Herrald
- Style: Late Victorian Gothic Revival
- Completed: 1912

Specifications
- Capacity: >300
- Materials: Red brick, Sandstone

Website
- https://www.firstpresbyterian.ca/

First Presbyterian Church is a historic Presbyterian Church in Canada congregation and Gothic Revival church building in the city's downtown core of Edmonton, Alberta, Canada. The congregation celebrated its 125th anniversary in November 2006.

== History ==
1915 image of First Presbyterian Church

The Organizational Meeting for this congregation was held on November 3, 1881, and the first building opened at 104 Street and 99 Avenue a year later. The second structure was completed and dedicated in July 1902 at 103 Street and Jasper Avenue. The present building was completed in November 1912. In September 1978 the building was designated a Provincial Historic Resource.

== Notable ministers ==
A notable minister was The Rev. David George McQueen, DD, LLD who served for 43 years, starting in 1887 upon graduation from Knox College, University of Toronto, and guided the formation of numerous congregations in the area. He served as Moderator of the General Assembly in 1912 (hosted by First in the second building) and as "Interim Moderator" in 1925, before Ephraim Scott was elected to resume the "Continuing Presbyterian Church". McQueen's predecessor and FPC's founding Minister was Rev. Andrew Browning Baird, DD, who arrived in Edmonton before the arrival of the railway, but left Edmonton for a professorship at Manitoba College (and like his successor, was also PCC Moderator, in 1916).

It is said that McQueen was a staunch opponent of Church Union in 1925, and that First Presbyterian Edmonton was the seat of the "rebellion" which saw 1/3 of the Presbyterian Church remain independent of the newly formed United Church of Canada.
