= Rosalind Goforth =

Canadian missionary

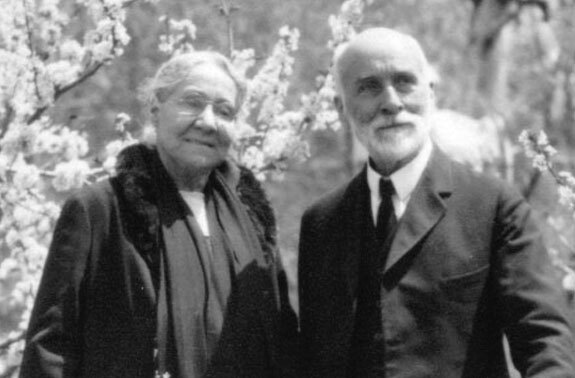
Rosalind Goforth and husband Jonathan

Rosalind Goforth (6 May 1864 – 31 May 1942) was a British-born Canadian Presbyterian missionary and author.

Born Florence Rosalind Bell-Smith near Kensington Gardens, London, England, she moved at the age of three with her parents to Montreal, Quebec.

Her father, John Bell-Smith, was an artist, and she also intended to go into art. She graduated from the Toronto School of Art in May 1885, and began preparing to return to London that autumn with the intention of completing her art studies.

Instead, however, she married Jonathan Goforth on 25 October 1887 at Knox Presbyterian Church, Toronto, Canada, and they both served their church in Manchuria and China.

They had eleven children, five of whom died as babies or very young children. Rosalind died in Toronto, Canada, and is buried alongside her husband at Mount Pleasant Cemetery, Toronto.

== Bibliography ==
- How I Know God Answers Prayer (1921)
- Chinese Diamonds for the King of Kings
- Goforth of China (1937)
- Climbing: Memoirs of a Missionary's Wife (1940)
