= John Seccombe =

18th Century New England/Canadian clergyman and comic poet

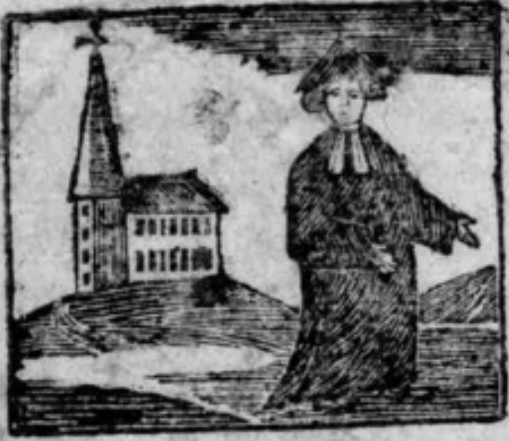
Father Abbey's Will. woodcut, Cambridge publisher. December, 1791

Rev. John Seccombe (25 April 1708 – 27 October 1792) was an author, a founder of Chester, Nova Scotia and was “the best-known and most highly respected clergyman in Nova Scotia.” He was also the author of Father Abbey's Will, which was printed as a poem and a broadsheet over 30 times throughout the 18th century in England and America. According to the Manual of American Literature, the poem "was one of the best comic poems of that day." As a result of the poem, the History of American Literature indicated that Seccombe "had an extraordinary notoriety" in America's early literary history.

== Harvard, Massachusetts ==
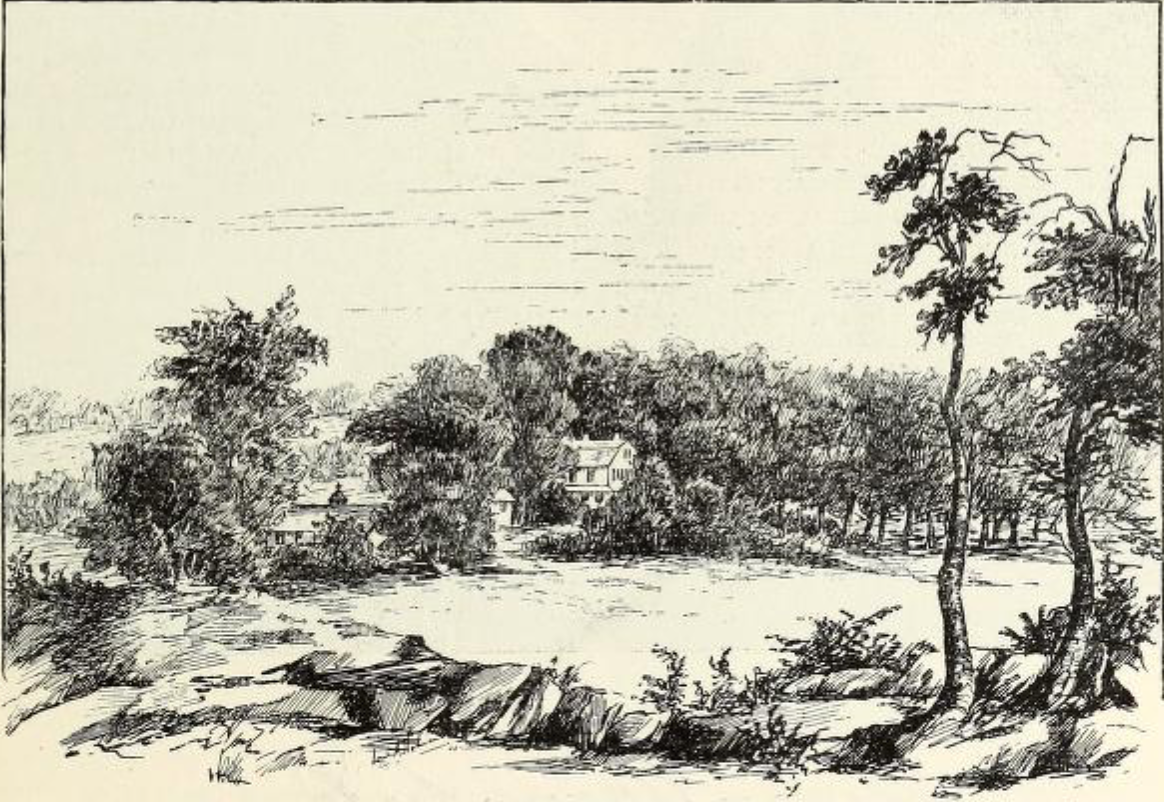
John Seccombe's mansion, Harvard, Massachusetts

Seccombe graduated Harvard College (1728) and then became the first congregational minister of the town of Harvard, Massachusetts, where he stayed for 25 years (1733 -1757). While at Harvard, he built the "grandest house" in Harvard at the centre of town and a cottage on one of the two largest islands in Bare Hill Pond (now named Ministers Island). (He sold the house to Henry Bromfield in 1765. His house in Harvard burned in 1854.)

As an author, Seccombe’s best known work is “Father Abbey’s will” (1732), which became famous throughout New England. The poem is a 15 stanza nonsense verse, which was turned into a Broadside ballad and published many times. Initially the poem was published in 1732 in the Gentleman's Magazine (June) and the London Magazine (August). It was continued to be republished by the Massachusetts Magazine in November, 1794. The name Abbey was a misnomer for Matthew Abdy, a custodian of the town, and the poem listed an inventory of Abdy's estate. The poetic composition was first published in Weekly Rehearsal (Boston, Mass.), 3 Jan. 1732. He was re-published in the Gentlman's Magazine, May 2, 1732 and London Magazine (October 1732) and continued to be re-published throughout the 18th and 19th century. The song was anthologized in Louis Untermeyer's Early American Poets (2001).

In 1736, he married the grand daughter of Rev. Solomon Stoddard. In 1745, he created upheaval in his community by sponsoring Rev. George Whitefield to speak.

== Chester, Nova Scotia ==
He left Massachusetts and helped establish Chester, Nova Scotia with Timothy Houghton (1761). He built a home at Pleasant Point, seven miles from Chester. He also preached at St. Matthew’s Church in Halifax. He ordained the first Presbyterian minister in British North America Bruin Romkes Comingo. In 1769, Seccombe baptized slaves at St. Matthews.

In the wake of the American patriot rebellion in the Siege of Fort Cumberland, in 1776, along with other members of St. Matthew's Church, Seccombe was arraigned by the Nova Scotia Council for having American patriot sympathies.

He went on to write the eulogies for the wives of Jonathan Belcher and Benjamin Green.

Having served 33 years in Chester, Seccombe died at his home on Seccombes Island, west of Chester.

== Legacy ==
- namesake of Seccombes Island, Nova Scotia
- namesake of Ministers Island, Bare Hill Pond, Harvard, Massachusetts

== See also ==
Nova Scotia in the American Revolution
