= William Mortimer Clark =

Canadian politician

The Honourable Sir William Mortimer Clark KC
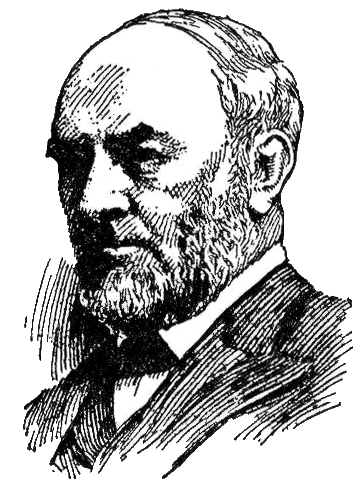

9th Lieutenant Governor of Ontario
- In office April 21, 1903 – September 21, 1908
- Monarch: Edward VII
- Governors General: The Earl of Minto; The Earl Grey
- Premier: George William Ross; James Whitney
- Preceded by: Sir Oliver Mowat
- Succeeded by: John Morison Gibson

Personal details
- Born: May 24, 1836 Aberdeen, Scotland
- Died: August 10, 1917 (aged 81) Prouts Neck, Maine
- Spouse: Elenor (Helen) Gordon (m. 1866) (1838-1913)
- Education: Marischal College; University of Edinburgh
- Occupation: lawyer, bank director

Sir William Mortimer Clark (also spelled Clarke), KC (May 24, 1836 – August 10, 1917) was a Canadian lawyer and politician.

== Life and career ==
Born in 1836 in Aberdeen, Scotland, Clark was educated at Marischal College and the University of Edinburgh. He came to Canada in 1859, following his mother and stepfather, the Rev. Alexander Topp, who had been called to Knox Presbyterian Church in Toronto, Ontario, and was called to the bar of Upper Canada in 1861.

A prominent social activist, he became a bank director and authored a number of articles on travel. In 1866, he married Elenor (Helen) Gordon, who predeceased him in 1913.

Clarke was appointed the ninth Lieutenant Governor of Ontario in 1903. He supported education and hospitals, including the Toronto General Hospital during his mandate, and served until 1908. He was created a Knight Bachelor in 1907. He was Chair of the Board of Knox College, Toronto from 1880, the year following his step-father's death, until his death in 1917, and was an Elder of Knox Church. In his last decade, both the Knox Church and Knox College had relocated in the University of Toronto area. He died at his summer home in Prouts Neck, Maine. His remains were brought back to Toronto, where he was interred in the Mount Pleasant Cemetery beside his wife.

Government offices
Preceded by Sir Oliver Mowat	Lieutenant Governor of Ontario; 1903–1908	Succeeded by John Morison Gibson
