= St. Andrew's Presbyterian Church (Lunenburg) =

Church in Lunenburg, Nova Scotia

Coordinates: 44°22′42″N 64°18′36″W

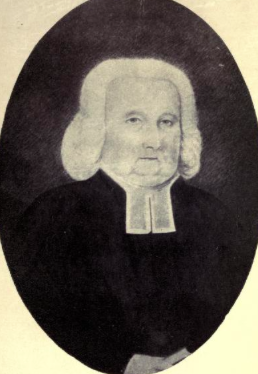
Rev Bruin Romkes Comingo, 1st Presbyterian Minister in Canada, St. Andrew's Presbyterian Church

St. Andrew's Presbyterian Church is a church in Lunenburg, Nova Scotia. The congregation is the longest history of any Presbyterian congregation in Canada. After meeting at a private house, the congregation worshipped in St. John's Anglican Church (Lunenburg) (1759–1770). The first church was built in 1770 and the first minister was Reverend Bruin Romkes Comingo, who served the community for 50 years until he died at age 95 (1820). The current church was built in the neo-Gothic style and dates from 1828.

== See also ==
- Presbyterian Church in Canada
- Little Dutch (Deutsch) Church
- St. John's Anglican Church (Lunenburg)
- Zion Evangelical Lutheran Church (Lunenburg)

== Links ==
- A sermon preached at Halifax, July 3d, 1770, at the ordination of the Rev. Bruin Romcas Camingoe to the Dutch Calvinistic Presbyterian Congregation at Lunenburg: by John Seccombe, of Chester, A. M., being the first preached in the province of Nova-Scotia, on such an occasion; to which is added an appendix
