= Jonathan Goforth =

Canadian Presbyterian missionary

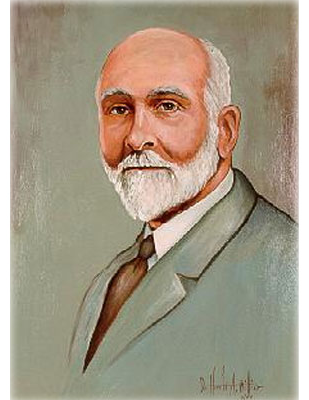
- Born: February 10, 1859; Canada
- Died: October 8, 1936 (aged 77); Canada
- Education: Knox College, Toronto (HDD)
- Spouse: Rosalind Goforth
- Children: 11
- Religion: Presbyterian

Jonathan Goforth (Chinese: 顧約拿單, February 10, 1859 – October 8, 1936) was a Canadian Presbyterian missionary to China with the Canadian Presbyterian Mission, along with his wife, Florence Rosalind (Bell-Smith) Goforth. Jonathan Goforth became the foremost missionary revivalist in early 20th-century China and helped to establish revivalism as a major element in Protestant China missions.

== Biography ==
Goforth grew up on an Oxford County, Ontario, farm, the seventh of eleven children. As a young man he taught school in Thamesford, Ontario. Hearing fellow Oxford County native George Leslie Mackay, Presbyterian missionary to Taiwan, speak, he sensed a call from God to go to China. He attended Knox College at the University of Toronto, where he graduated in 1887, and was awarded the Doctor of Divinity in 1915. During his training, Goforth met Rosalind Bell-Smith at the Toronto Union Mission. Born in London, England, she had grown up in Montreal, Quebec, Canada. They married in 1887, in his final year at Knox, and eventually had eleven children, six of whom survived childhood.

After initially subjecting him to teasing and even hazing, Goforth's classmates came to support him greatly in his quest to become an overseas missionary. Goforth had also read Hudson Taylor's China's Spiritual Need and Claims, a book that so excited him that he ordered many copies and mailed them to many pastors that he knew in order to promote missionary work in China.

The Goforths were sent to pioneer the North Henan mission in 1888. Their work was difficult and they lost five of their eleven children to sickness.

In 1900, the Goforths had to flee for many miles across China during the Boxer Rebellion. Jonathan was attacked and injured with a sword, but they both survived and escaped to the safety of one of the "Treaty Ports".

The Goforths returned to Canada for a year. After their return to Henan in 1901, Jonathan Goforth felt increasingely restless. In 1904 and 1905 he was inspired by news of the great Welsh revival and read Charles Finney's Lectures on Revivals. In 1907, circumstances brought him to witness firsthand the stirring Korean revival ("When the Spirit's Fire Swept Korea" [1943] represents his response). As Goforth returned to China through Manchuria in early 1908, congregations invited him back. During his extended visit there the "Manchurian revival" broke out, the first such revival to gain nationwide publicity in China as well as internationally. From 1908 to 1913, thousands of Chinese people converted to Christ. The revival transformed Goforth's life and ministry; from then on he was primarily an evangelist and revivalist, not a settled missionary. He also became one of the best-known of all China missionaries, admired by many, but criticized by some for "emotionalism".

In 1925, he decided to remain within the Presbyterian Church in Canada, and his Henan station was transferred to the support of the United Church of Canada. He and Rosalind, despite their age and frailties, were then sent by the church to begin work in Manchuria, where they remained until Goforth's eyesight failed in 1935. He remained active into the 1930s, especially in Manchuria; in 1931 the Goforths coauthored Miracle Lives of China. After his death in Toronto, Rosalind, a capable writer who had first published in 1920, wrote the popular Goforth of China (1937, with many reprints), and her own autobiography, Climbing: Memories of a Missionary's Wife (1940).

Their final years in Canada were spent recounting their stories to many congregations. Goforth died at his son's manse in Wallaceburg, Ontario, after preaching the previous evening in nearby Wyoming, Ontario. The funeral service was held in Toronto's Knox Church, and Goforth is buried in the Mount Pleasant Cemetery in the same city.

== See also ==
- Christianity in China
- Christianity in Korea
