= Bruin Romkes Comingo =

Canadian presbyterian minister

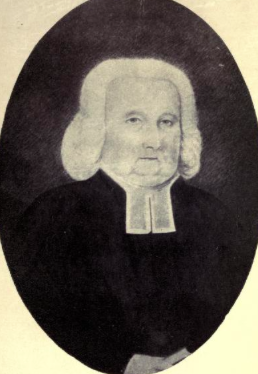
Rev Bruin Romkes Comingo, 1st Presbyterian Minister in Canada, St. Andrew's Presbyterian Church (Lunenburg)

Bruin Romkes Comingo ("Mr. Brown") was the first Presbyterian minister ordained in Canada. He arrived in Halifax as a Foreign Protestants during Governor Edward Cornwallis' tenure. He was ordained by Rev. John Seccombe. He served at St. Andrew's Presbyterian Church (Lunenburg), Nova Scotia. (His ordination was preceded by the irregular ordination of John Frost (minister) in Yarmouth County, Nova Scotia.)
