= David George McQueen =

David George McQueen (1854–1930) was a Presbyterian minister who spent much of his career in the city of Edmonton, Alberta, Canada. The neighbourhood of McQueen is named in his honour.

McQueen was born in Kirkwall, Ontario in 1854, and moved to Edmonton in 1887 upon graduation from Knox College, University of Toronto. He served for 43 years as minister at First Presbyterian Church, and played a role in the founding of several other Edmonton area congregations.

He was awarded an honorary degree by the University of Alberta in 1915.

His son Alexander died during World War I on June 4, 1916, from wounds sustained during the Battle of Mont Sorrel.

His life is chronicled in the book McQueen of Edmonton by E.A. Corbett.

Mount McQueen in the Canadian Rockies was named in his honour in 1953.
