= Canadian Presbyterian Mission =

Presbyterian Church in Canada missionary society

Canadian Presbyterian Mission was a Presbyterian Church in Canada missionary society that was involved in sending workers to countries such as Trinidad and Tobago during British rule and China during the late Qing Dynasty, the most famous of which were Jonathan Goforth and his wife, Rosalind.

== See also ==
- Protestant missionary societies in China during the 19th Century
- Timeline of Chinese history
- 19th-century Protestant missions in China
- List of Protestant missionaries in China
- Christianity in China
- Presbyterian Church in Canada
- United Church of Canada

== Bibliography ==
- Ion, A. Hamish (1999). The Cross in the Dark Valley: The Canadian Protestant Missionary Movement in the Japanese Empire, 1931-1945. The Cross and the Rising Sun. Vol. 3. Waterloo, Ontario, Canada: Wilfrid Laurier University Press. p. 428. ISBN 0-88920-294-X.
