= John Frost (minister) =

Minister

Rev. John Frost (22 October 1716 Kittery, Maine – 13 July 1779, Argyle, NS; went to Argyle, Nova Scotia) was the first ordained Protestant minister in present-day Canada. (Ten months later Rev. Bruin Romkes Comingo was officially ordained as the first minister). The "irregular ordination" happened on 21 September 1769. Contrary to accepted practice, the ordination took place without the assistance or representation of any other church body or association. Two years earlier, on 18 December 1767, the Chebogue church (near present-day Yarmouth) chose Frost to be its minister.

He was also one of two Nova Scotians convicted of sedition for joining the rebellion in the American Revolution. On 23 August 1775, the Governor of Nova Scotia Francis Legge dismissed Mr. Frost, JP, from his magistrate’s office for expressing the hope, during one of his sermons, that “the British forces in America might be returned to England confuted and confused.” He was summarily dismissed from all Government employment. He is buried at the Argyle Historic Church and Cemetery.

== See also ==
- Nova Scotia in the American Revolution
