= Goforth, Kentucky =

Unincorporated community in Kentucky, United States

Goforth
- Unincorporated community
- Location within the state of Kentucky Goforth (the United States)
- Coordinates: 38°39′53″N 84°26′56″W
- Country: United States
- State: Kentucky
- County: Pendleton

Area
  - Total: 150.53 sq mi (389.87 km^{2})
  - Land: 150.15 sq mi (388.89 km^{2})
  - Water: 0.38 sq mi (0.98 km^{2})
- Elevation: 922 ft (281 m)

Population (2000)
  - Total: 8,044
  - Density: 53.57/sq mi (20.68/km^{2})
- Time zone: UTC-5 (Eastern (EST))
  - Summer (DST): UTC-4 (EST)
- GNIS feature ID: 508105

Goforth is an unincorporated community located in Pendleton County, Kentucky, United States. Its post office is closed.
