= Knox Presbyterian Church (Toronto) =

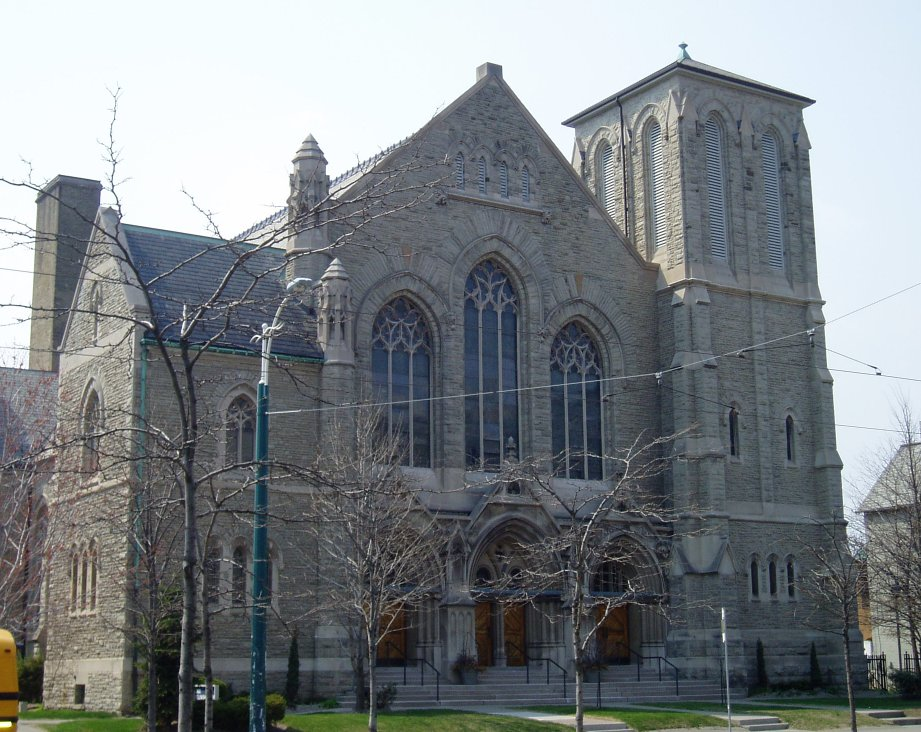
- Knox Presbyterian Church, Toronto
- Knox Presbyterian Church
- 43.662522°N 79.402463°W
- Location: 630 Spadina Avenue; Toronto, Ontario; M5S 2H4
- Denomination: Presbyterian Church in Canada
- Website: www.knoxtoronto.org

History
- Status: Church
- Founded: 1820

Architecture
- Functional status: Active
- Architect: James Wilson Gray
- Style: Romanesque Revival, Gothic Revival
- Completed: January 1909

Knox Presbyterian Church is a Presbyterian church in downtown Toronto, Ontario, Canada.

== History ==
In 1820, the first Presbyterian congregation in Toronto (then the Town of York) was formed, and after the donation of land from Jesse Ketchum, built a church on Richmond Street. This church was known as First Presbyterian Congregation of York, Upper Canada, and James Harris (later to be Ketchum's son in law) became minister.

In 1830, the larger St. Andrew's Church was founded, and it quickly became the city's primary Presbyterian Church. St. Andrew's was aligned with the Church of Scotland; the Canadian Synod was formed in 1831.

This Richmond Street church was more evangelical, and had become independent of the United Synod of the Canadas in 1834, and remained apart from any other group (including the United Presbyterian Church of Scotland who started their Toronto congregation in 1838) until 1844.

In 1843, the Church of Scotland split, when many of the evangelicals led by Thomas Chalmers, withdrew to form the Free Church of Scotland, in a dispute called the Disruption of 1843. This dispute hit the Canadas the following year at the respective Synod Meetings in Kingston and Nova Scotia; a faction broke off from St. Andrew's, who remained in the "Auld" Kirk.

This group was approached by the York congregation, and the two groups decided to join and become a stronger and united Free Church congregation presence in Toronto that they named Knox's Church, after the Scottish Church reformer John Knox; they called an experienced minister from Paisley, Scotland, Rev. Dr. Robert Burns, to become their first minister. Burns was the former Secretary of the Glasgow Missionary Society, a friend of Chalmers, and uncle of another well-known minister and missionary, William Chalmers Burns. Burns was initially a lecturer, then later full-time professor, in the nearby Knox Free Church Theological College. Mr. Harris retired from the York congregation, and remained connected with the congregation until his death in 1874.

In 1847, the old York Church was destroyed by a fire. The congregation built a new larger church on the same lot, this time facing Queen Street West between Yonge and Bay. Knox quickly became the leading Free Church congregation in Canada, helping to spread the movement throughout the colony. One of the most prominent members of this church was George Brown founder of the Toronto Globe and also the Banner, and an eventual member of the Fathers of Confederation, upon formation of the Dominion of Canada in 1867.

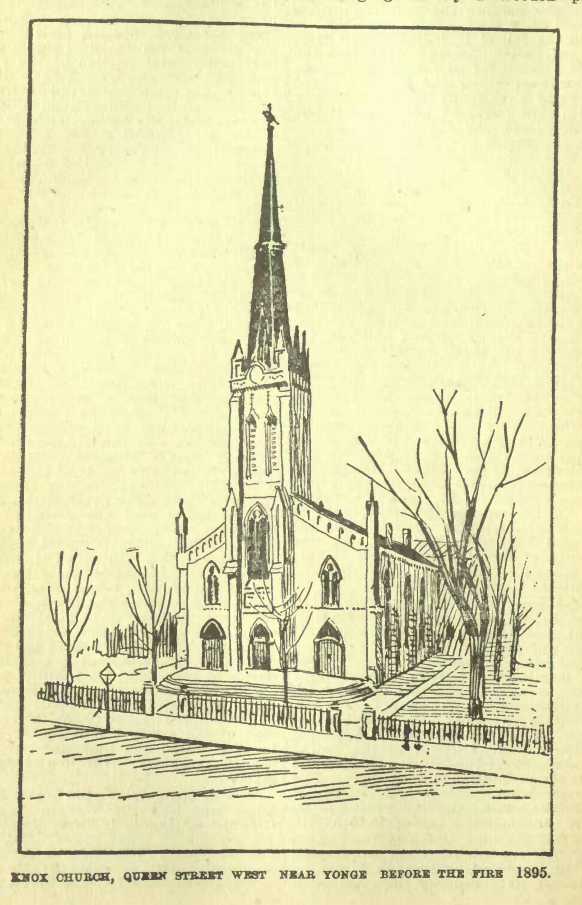
The Knox church building from 1847 to 1895

From the split ("the disruption") in the Church of Scotland and in the Canadas, Knox took an active role in the reunion of all the Presbyterian groups in Canada. In 1861, the Free Church of which Knox belonged to, and the Canada Synod of the United Presbyterian Church of Scotland joined; and in 1875, the Presbyterian Church in Canada, uniting the "Auld Kirk" and "Free Kirk". Rev Alexander Topp, Minister from 1858-80, took lead as Secretary of the 1875 Union, and was elected Moderator of the General Assembly, the following year. His stepson, Sir William Mortimer Clark was a longtime Elder, and 9th Lieutenant Governor of Ontario from 1903-1908.

Over time, Knox's location had become more commercial with fewer residents in the area. At the time Toronto had strict Lord's Day laws that prevented public transit from running on Sundays, making it imperative that churches be located near to the population.

In 1895, the church was severely damaged by a fire that began at the Robert Simpson Building next door. This fire destroyed the steeple, which was never fully rebuilt. It was eventually decided to move the church in 1906, and in January 1909, the church officially moved into its present home at 630 Spadina Avenue just west of the University of Toronto, at Harbord Street; the memorial stones cited in the enclosed article (1886 Profile), were also moved into the new building.

The mixed Romanesque Revival and Gothic Revival building was designed by congregation member James Wilson Gray.

In June 1925, Knox was instrumental in maintaining the continuity of the Presbyterian Church in Canada, as it was from this building, that the midnight vigil was held, led by the 79 Ministers and Elders who voted against the consummation of the union (in nearby College Street Church) that formed the United Church of Canada, as they maintained continuity with their General Assembly. As a congregation, Knox had voted against Union earlier that year, by a vote of 20-788. There were gains to the congregation from some of those in the surrounding congregations that went into the Union.

In the 1950s, the congregation was challenged to leave the community, as post World War II suburban expansion greatly affected Toronto, and the Spadina Expressway (later abandoned) was proposed to run along Spadina Avenue. Under the leadership of Rev. Dr. William Fitch, who arrived in early 1955 from the Springburn area of Glasgow, Scotland, the congregation built an adjoining hall (Knox Fellowship Centre) in 1961, and expanded its ministries into the inner city (Evangel Hall at 573 Queen Street West had been run by Knox since 1913; moved to larger facilities at 552 Adelaide Street West in 2006), the Universities (including Toronto Metropolitan University--formerly Ryerson and York, and community colleges, such as nearby George Brown College--named after an early ruling Elder), and during the summer months, began the weekly Knox Summer Fellowship, Wednesday Evening Services that brought (or introduced) renowned speakers from around the world for over 50 years into the late 2010s.

In 2020, despite the Covid-19 Pandemic, the congregation celebrated 200 years of ministry.

The congregation is reflective of a changing demographic in a multicultural community; ESL classes are offered, and has also developed a broad support group with many Christian missionaries under their support and care. There is a Knox Youth Dinner & Food Bank programme for street youth in the winter, and continues to be blessed with well-attended Sunday Morning worship services.

There is also a great support and tradition for missionaries, both on the home and International scenes. There is a current roster of 46 (19 couples), as well as 17 "Phase 2" Missionaries (4 couples) who are supported in their retirement years; along with others who have been linked through liaisons with other recognized organizations including the Presbyterian Church.

== Senior Ministers ==
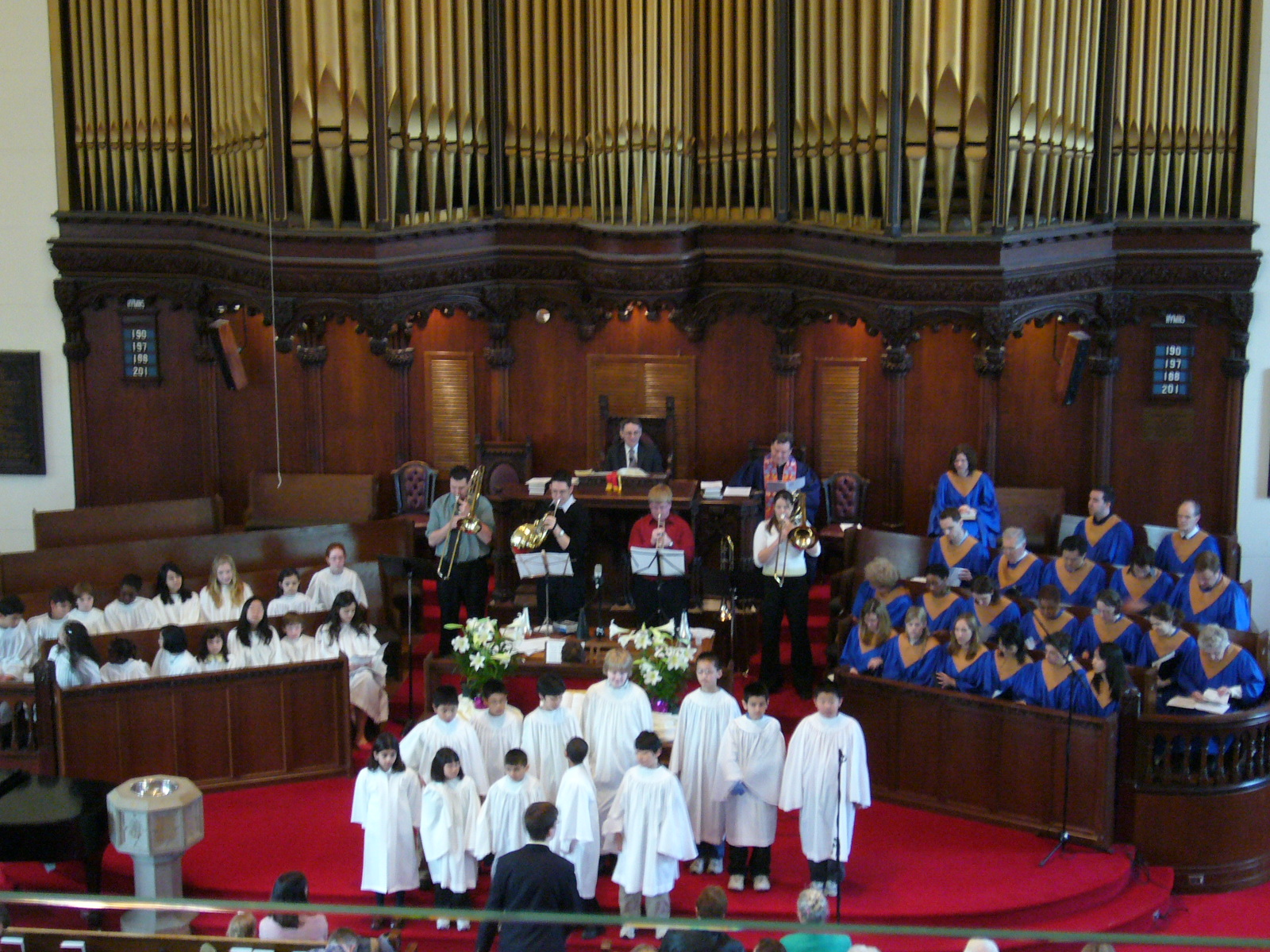
Knox Easter Service, 2006

- Alex N. Macleod, 2023-
- Philip F. Reinders, 2012–2021
- J. Kevin Livingston, June 2000-December 2009. Left to professor at Tyndale University College and Seminary
- John A. Vissers, 1995-1999. First Canadian-born Senior Minister to pastor at Knox. Left to become Principal of The Presbyterian College, Montreal, and later at Knox College
- Mariano di Gangi, 1987 (Interim Minister), Inducted; 1989–1992
- J. Glyn Owen, 1974–1986
- William Fitch, 1955–1972
- Robert Barr+, 1947–1953
- T. Christie Innes, 1939–1944
- John (Jock) Inkster, 1920–1938
- A. B. Winchester, 1901-1919 (Minister Extra Muros to 1938)
- Henry Martyn Parsons, 1880–1900
- Alexander Topp+, 1858–1879
- Robert Burns, 1845–1856, Left to become full-time professor at Knox Free Church College
- James Harris (York Presbyterian), 1823–1844

+died in pastorate

== Assistant and Associate Ministers ==
- John McNicol
- John Laird
- Ian S. Rennie
- George Lowe
- John (Jack) Voelkel
- Blake Walker
- Greg Scharf
- A. Donald Macleod
- Alex M. McCombie
- Wayne Hancock
- John Hong
- Alex N. MacLeod
- Thomas Maxwell
- Nick Renaud

and other numerous students from neighbouring Knox College and elsewhere.
