= Presbyterian Church in Canada =

Protestant Christian denomination in Canada

- Église presbytérienne du Canada
- Abbreviation: PCC
- Classification: Protestant
- Orientation: Mainline Calvinist
- Polity: Presbyterian
- Associations: World Communion of Reformed Churches; Canadian Council of Churches; World Council of Churches; Evangelical Fellowship of Canada; (observer)
- Region: Canada; Bermuda
- Origin: 1875
- Separations: Canadian Assemblies of God (1912); 70% of the Presbyterian Church in Canada joined the United Church of Canada in 1925
- Congregations: 821
- Members: 79,961 (2019)
- Ministers: 1,337
- Official website: presbyterian.ca
- (source, Acts and Proceedings 2007 p 713)

The Presbyterian Church in Canada (PCC; French: Église presbytérienne du Canada) is a Presbyterian denomination, serving in Canada under this name since 1875. The United Church of Canada claimed the right to the name from 1925 to 1939. According to the Canada 2021 Census 301,400 Canadians identify themselves as Presbyterian, that is, 0.8 percent of the population.

The Canadian roots of the Presbyterian Church in Canada can be traced to both Scottish settlers and French Huguenots, and the first Presbyterian churches formed in the late 16th and early 17th centuries, following such European Protestant Reformation theologians as John Calvin and John Knox.

Once the largest Christian denomination in English-speaking Canada, in 1925 some 70 percent of its congregations joined with the Methodist Church, Canada and the Congregational Union of Ontario and Quebec to form the United Church of Canada. The terms Continuing Presbyterians and Non-Concurring Presbyterians were then used by those who did not participate in the merger, until the legal right to use the name "Presbyterian Church in Canada" was regained in 1939. The Supreme Court of Canada ruled that although the institutional Presbyterian Church in Canada may legally have merged with the Methodist Church, the United Church had effectively vacated the name and it remained available to the non-concurring Presbyterians. It also was a benefit to have support from Governor General Lord Tweedsmuir, and from Prime Minister William Lyon Mackenzie King.

== Background and roots ==
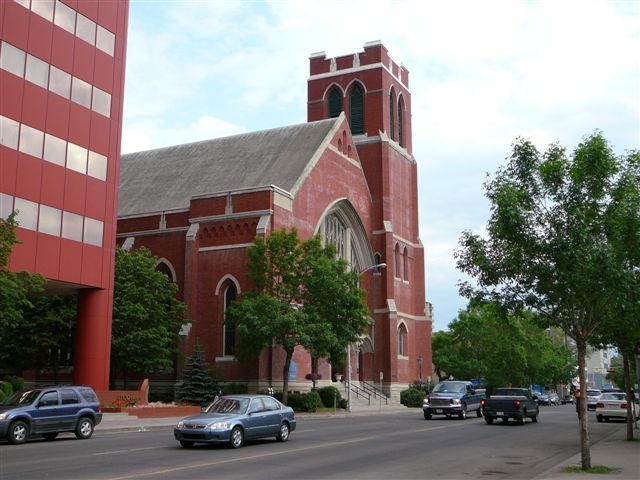
Presbyterian Church in Edmonton

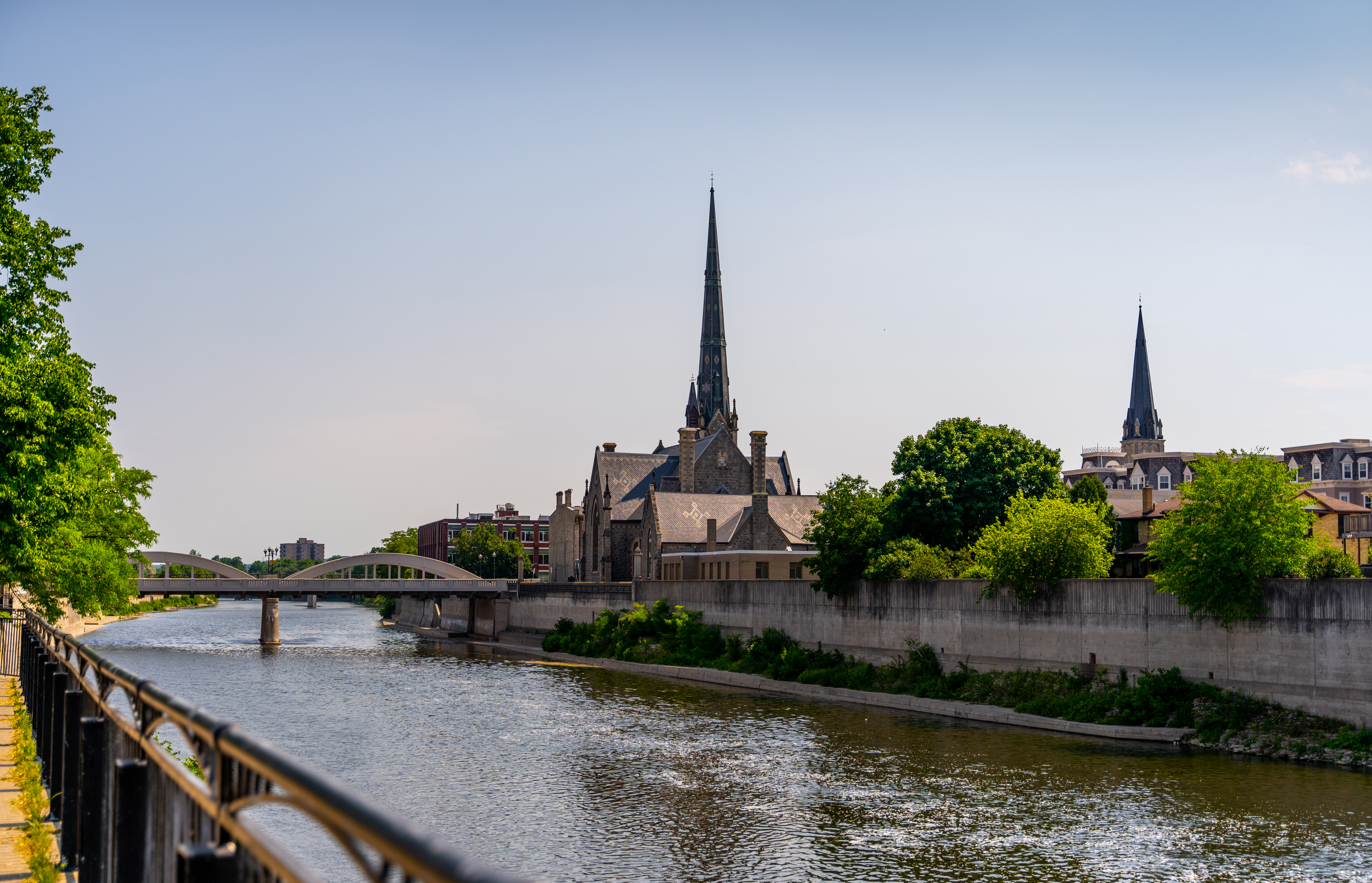
Central Presbyterian Church in Galt, Ontario

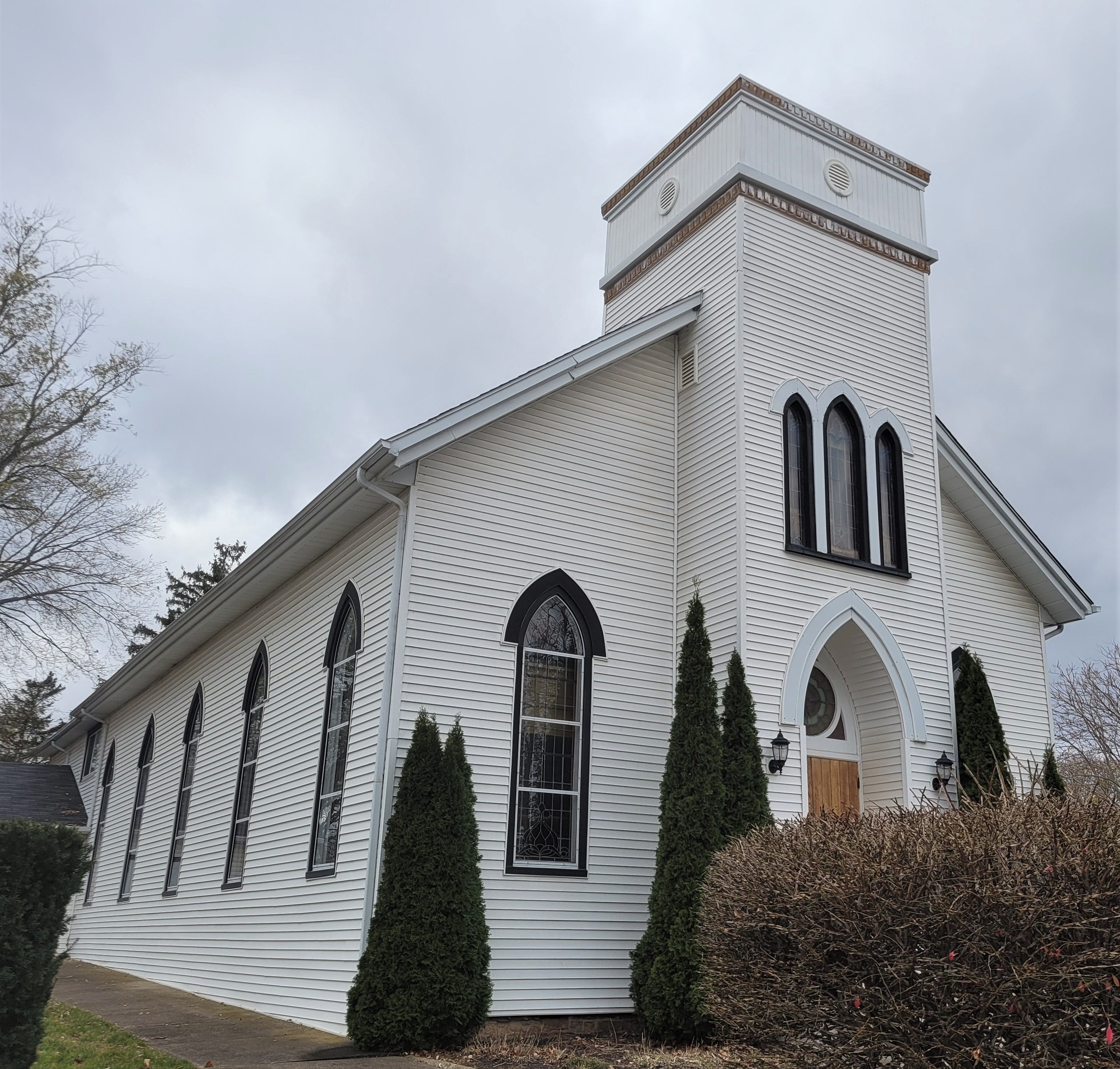
Stamford Church in Niagara Falls

In 1759, Great Britain gained control of the French colony of New France, seized during the Seven Years' War. At the Plains of Abraham outside of the walled Citadelle of Quebec, there was a Scottish Battalion, the 78th Fraser Highlanders, complete with a Presbyterian chaplain, Reverend Robert MacPherson. This group became the roots of St. Andrew's Church in Quebec City.

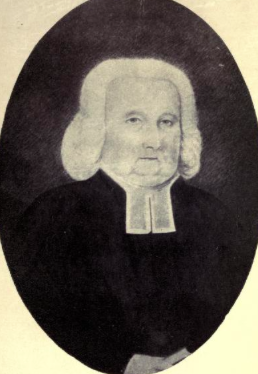
Rev Bruin Romkes Comingo, 1st Presbyterian Minister ordained in Canada, St. Andrew's Presbyterian Church (Lunenburg)

In the colony of Nova Scotia the Presbyterians were initially Reformed settlers of Germanic roots, who started St. Andrew's Church in Lunenburg in 1753; they joined Church of Scotland's Nova Scotia Synod (which had been founded in August 1833) in 1837. In Truro, Nova Scotia, First United Church (Presbyterian until 1925) was founded in 1760 by Scottish settlers. St. James Presbyterian Church was formed in 1925 by the minority that did not join the United Church. In Halifax, St. Matthew's dates back to 1749 as a "Dissenting Protestant Worship House", and adhered to Presbyterian polity at a later date; the Presbyterian Church of St. David is another 1925 "Minority Group" from within downtown Halifax congregations including St Matthew's, and celebrated its 80th anniversary in 2005, meeting in the former Grafton Street Methodist (1869) building, acquired in their early days.

After the departure of the Thirteen American Colonies from British North America, there was an increase in population within the Canadas, divided in 1791 into Upper Canada (now called Ontario) and Lower Canada (now called Quebec), including most of the previously populated areas of the New France colony, and within the Maritimes, including Nova Scotia, New Brunswick, and Prince Edward Island.

Some of the early Canadian Presbyterians were United Empire Loyalists of Scots descent, and others came directly from Scotland, such as in the 1773 arrival of The Hector in Pictou, Nova Scotia.

Early Clergy represented many strands of reformed theology, and were educated in Scotland, Ireland, and the United States. Initial attempts at forming native Presbyteries were futile. American influences in the Canadas came first from Dutch Reformed missionaries from New York State, and later American Presbyterians from many different Presbyterian groupings.

Congregations were eventually formed in many communities (initially in townships over towns), and usually after a lengthy period without any supply from clergy (in the Red River Colony in Manitoba, it took thirty years); in many cases, family worship consisted of devotions and catechisms.

Two events led to the early departure of American support of Canadian Churches: the War of 1812 (1812–14), and the 1837 Rebellions in Upper and Lower Canada; the latter resulted in political reform, and responsible government; Upper Canada became Canada West, and Lower Canada became Canada East in 1841, until 1867. In southern Ontario, there was once a Stamford Presbytery; their last congregation, located near Milton, Ontario closed in 1951, and Stamford Church in Niagara Falls joined the PCC in 1936.

In the Maritimes (now the Provinces of Nova Scotia, New Brunswick, and Prince Edward Island), the original Scots Presbyterians were from two branches of the Secessionist United Presbyterian Church of Scotland, and prior to their union in 1817 which created the Synod of Nova Scotia, there was the Associate Presbytery of Truro, erected in 1786, and the Presbytery of Pictou, erected in 1795. There were still Church of Scotland congregations and ministers who remained outside this group, before its incorporation in New Brunswick on January 30, 1833 (Synod from 1835) and in Nova Scotia.

In 1811, Rev. Thomas McCulloch formed the Pictou Academy, the first educational school to train ministers. Some of its graduates travelled to Scotland to continue their training. This led McCulloch to Halifax to teach, where Dalhousie University was eventually formed; from another academy in West River, Pictou County, (1848), led also to Halifax as Presbyterian College (Halifax), later Pine Hill Seminary (United Church), that since 1971, is now part of the Atlantic School of Theology.

In the Canadas, the United Presbytery of the Canadas was formed in 1818, as a looser arrangement of clergy supported by other groups. By 1839 this United Synod (at one time there were three presbyteries) was absorbed by The Presbyterian Church of Canada in Connection with the Established Church of Scotland, erected into a synod by the parent church in 1831, bolstered with missionaries supplied from the Glasgow Missionary Society. In 1834, this group also began to receive a number of United Synod clergy and congregations, which led to the aforementioned union with the Auld Kirk by 1840.

In 1831, the United Associate Synod in Scotland (after 1847, the United Presbyterian Church of Scotland) agreed to send missionaries to the Canadas; three were appointed, and arrived in 1832. On Christmas Day 1834, a Canadian Synod was erected in the newly incorporated city of Toronto, which also included congregations and at least one minister from the United Synod of the Canadas. They later started their own Toronto congregation in 1838. and a Theological College in London, Canada West in 1844.

In Toronto, the United Synod of Canada congregation (formed in the Town of York in 1820), and their minister Rev. James Harris withdrew in 1834, remaining independent until 1844, when they joined with Free Church dissenters from the Church of Scotland's St. Andrew's Toronto (formed in 1830) to create Knox Presbyterian Church, Toronto.

The unity in the Church of Scotland Canada Synod following the United Synod merger was short-lived, but provided the opportunity to establish a Theological College, Queen's College, in Kingston, Canada West in 1841; Queen's Theological College (United Church) is now part of Queen's University.

In June 1844, the Synod met in Kingston, Ontario, and paralleled the situation that had affected the Scottish Assembly in 1843, when a large group also withdrew, and formed a Free Church of Scotland Canadian Synod. By the following September, most of the theological students at Queen's had joined the Free Church, proceeded to Toronto and founded Knox College; they had merged with the aforementioned United Presbyterian Church of Scotland college in 1861, which had moved to Toronto from London, Ontario in 1853.

In the Maritime Provinces, colonies were set up in Nova Scotia, New Brunswick, Prince Edward Island, and on Cape Breton Island. As in both Upper Canada and Lower Canada, there were various groups organizing congregations. The effects of the 1843 disruption in the Church of Scotland was felt in Nova Scotia; the colonial ministers were either invited back to congregations in Scotland, or they sided with the Free Church in Nova Scotia and elsewhere. The formal structure of the Church of Scotland was affected there for a decade.

In 1860, a year before a union occurred in the Canadas, the Presbyterian Church of the Lower Provinces was created by the merger of Free Church and United Presbyterian Church congregations in Nova Scotia, including Cape Breton, and Prince Edward Island, and in 1866, they were joined by their compatriots in New Brunswick.

In June 1861, the Canada Presbyterian Church was formed with the merger of the Canadian Synods of the Free Church of Scotland and the United Presbyterian Church. This became the dominant Presbyterian grouping in the Canadas, growing in cities, towns, villages, and even into the United States, including Illinois (Chicago, a French community at St. Anne and a Gaelic-speaking congregation in Elmira) and border cities in Michigan and New York State, as well as into the Canadian Northwest Territories with Rev. John Black to the Red River Colony at Kildonan, and Rev. James Nisbet to Prince Albert. Robert Jamieson was sent by the inaugural Synod of the Canada Presbyterian Church from the York Mills and Fisherville charge near Toronto (The latter Church is now located in Toronto's Black Creek Pioneer Village, adjacent to a Manse from the oldest 1817 Toronto area congregation located in Richmond Hill) to the British Columbia colony, where he started congregations in New Westminster, Nanaimo, and in the Fraser Valley. After 1875, he joined with the Church of Scotland, until the Canadian Pacific Railway reached Burrard's Inlet (later Vancouver) in 1885, they rejoined (along with other congregations) the Presbyterian Church in Canada, and a British Columbia Synod was formed later.

The Canadian Presbyterian Church started a second theological college, The Presbyterian College, Montreal in 1867 (charter granted 1865). Both Knox College and The Presbyterian College, Montreal remained with the Presbyterian Church in Canada after Church Union in 1925.

In 1867, the Church of Scotland's bodies in the Maritimes merged to become the Synod of the Presbyterian Church of the Maritime Provinces of British North America.

In 1869, the Canada Presbyterian Church added another level to its growing Church structure—its Annual Synod became a General Assembly, and four smaller, regional synods were formed: Montreal, serving both Quebec and Eastern Ontario; Toronto; Hamilton; and London, with a few congregations in the USA.

The first Moderator of the CPC's General Assembly, Rev. William Ormiston, then of Central C.P.C. in Hamilton, Ontario, sent out letters at the end of his term (he was moving to serve a Dutch Reformed Church in New York City), for these groups to hold a conference of all strands of Presbyterianism in the new Dominion of Canada. This conference was held in Montreal in September 1870, and led these four groups to produce a basis of union, which in June 1874 saw both the Canada Presbyterian Church's General Assembly and Church of Scotland Canada Synod meet in Ottawa, where the proceedings and final preparations and delegations met in the nearby Knox (CPC) and St. Andrew's (Church of Scotland) congregations.

== The Presbyterian Church in Canada 1875–1925 ==
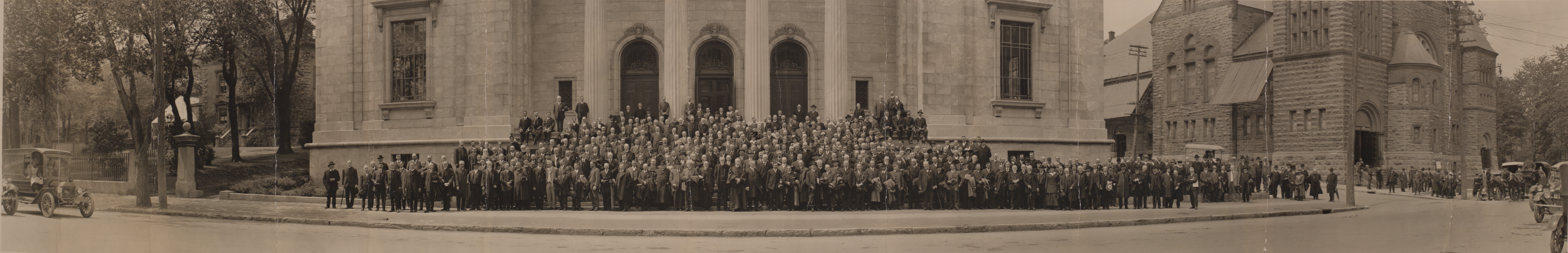
General Assembly Presbyterian Church of Canada in 1917

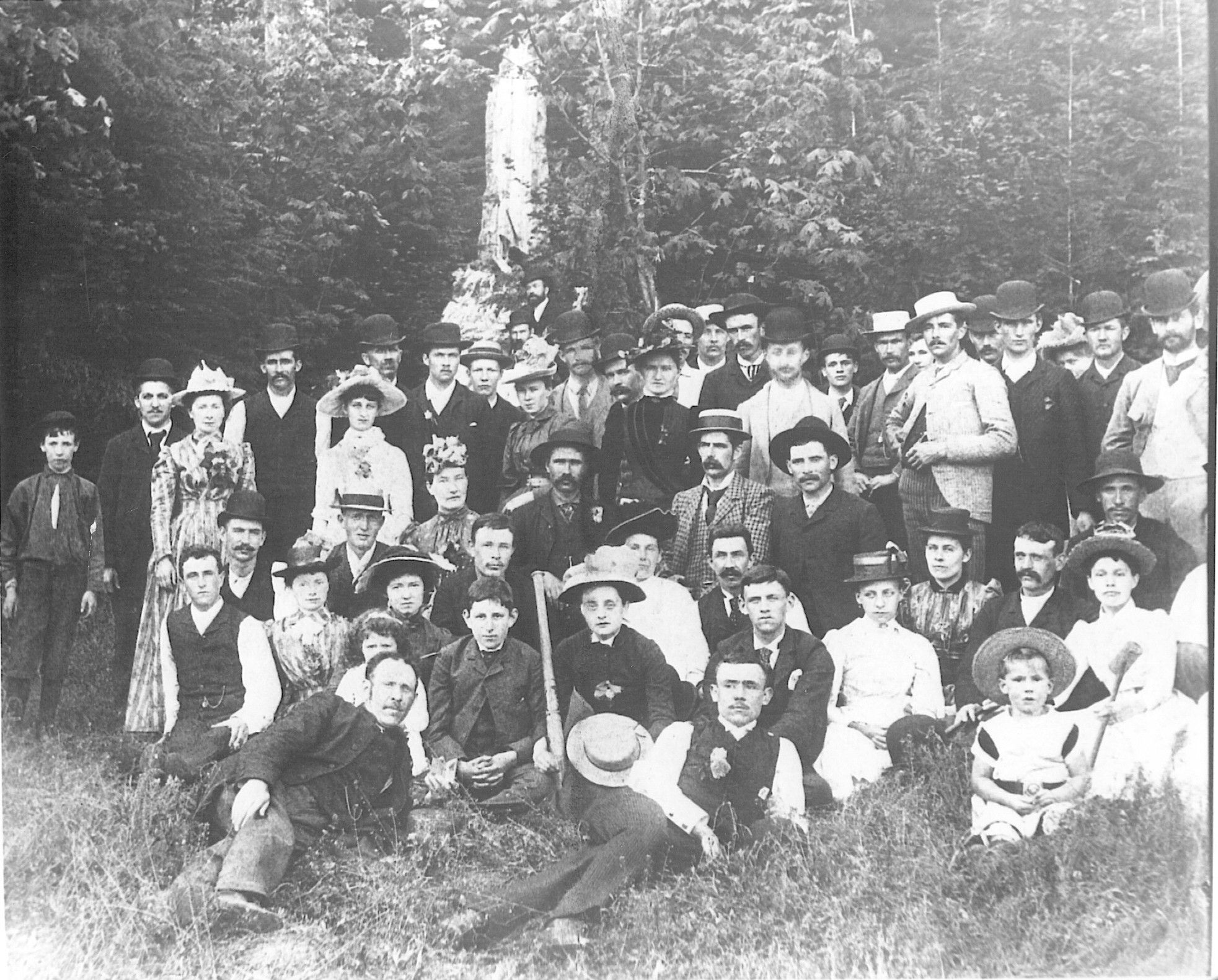
First Presbyterian Church of Vancouver, Picnic in North Vancouver July 1891 featuring Vancouver Mayor T.S. Baxter

On June 15, 1875, the four Canadian Presbyterian churches:

- The Canada Presbyterian Church (June 1861);
- The Presbyterian Church of Canada in Connection with the Established Church of Scotland (1831);
- The Synod of the Presbyterian Church of the Maritime Provinces of British North America (1867); and
- The Presbyterian Church of the Lower Provinces (1866),

representing many of the parallel events and controversies within the Church of Scotland joined to form The Presbyterian Church in Canada, in Montreal's Victoria Hall.

Although there were a number of Church of Scotland congregations, mainly from the Maritimes, as well as St. Andrew's Montreal, and a few others in Glengarry County Ontario, that resisted this union, many of these eventually entered the PCC in the early 20th century. In 1918 the Church of St. Andrew and St. Paul, Montreal was created with the merger of this prime congregation, the last so affiliated in Canada with the Church of Scotland; in 1932 they moved onto Sherbrooke Street, and celebrated their bicentenary in 2002.

As a united group, the PCC consolidated and grew all across Canada in both the established areas, and expanded into newly settled parts.

- The Synod of the Maritime Provinces (renamed Atlantic in the 1960s) comprised the former domain of the two "Lower Provinces" groups. Their Synod meetings are known as "The Little Assembly".
- The Synod of Montreal and Ottawa replaced the CPC's Montreal Synod; this name was changed in the 1950s to Quebec and Eastern Ontario.
- The Synod of Toronto and Kingston took in the former CPC Toronto Synod, as well as adding the CPC Kingston Presbytery from Montreal. This Synod later added northeastern Ontario, and the name was altered in 2005 to: The Synod of Central, Northeastern Ontario, and Bermuda.
- The Synod of Hamilton and London merged two CPC Synods into one, London and Hamilton. It was renamed the Synod of Southwestern Ontario in 1997.

Manitoba, established as a province in 1870, had been settled in The Red River-Selkirk Settlement, and had established a congregation in Kildonan in 1818; they waited 30 years for a minister, John Black, supplied from the Free Church in Canada, after he served as a missionary to the French in Canada East near Montreal. He was later joined by Rev. James Nisbet formerly of Oakville, Canada West, who then established a territorial outpost in Prince Albert (now Saskatchewan) Northwest Territories. James Robertson, a minister from Oxford County, Ontario was first called (1873) to a congregation in Winnipeg, and in 1881 was appointed as missions superintendent, where he provided leadership and growth to new settlers, student ministers, ordained missionaries, and congregations. Manitoba College started in Kildonan in 1871, received support from both Canadian churches prior to 1875, and at the 1883 General Assembly, their moderator, Rev. Dr. John Mark King (from St. James Square Church in Toronto) was called to become their first principal. With the construction of the Canadian Pacific Railway across Canada, development and settlement of the Western Canada began, from Manitoba, and by 1905, the provinces of Saskatchewan and Alberta were formed.

- The Synod of Manitoba and the Northwest was formed in 1884, when the Presbytery of Manitoba (with synodical powers) was divided into three presbyteries.
- The Synod of British Columbia was erected in 1890, including congregations in present-day Alberta.

In 1905, when the provinces of Alberta and Saskatchewan were formed, separate synods for each were created:

- The Synod of Manitoba was the new name, although Manitoba and Northwestern Ontario is the present name, noting the Presbytery of Superior (from 1884), comprising remaining congregations in Thunder Bay and Greenstone (formerly Geraldton); recently, congregations were closed in both Fort Frances and Atikokan.
- The Synod of Saskatchewan covers the bounds of the province.
- The Synod of Alberta (and the Northwest was added in 1990).

With the deaths of King (1899) and Robertson (1901), their respective successors led in the cause of Church Union with other Protestant bodies, including Anglicans and Baptists, which culminated in the formation of the United Church of Canada with an almost unanimous grouping of the Methodist and Congregationalist Churches in Canada, on June 10, 1925.

== 1925 and since ==
Following years of debate, and postponement over World War I, voting on Canadian Church Union took place in the late months of 1924, and into 1925.

On June 9, 1925, the group consisting of those Presbyterian congregations, and a number of minority groups which did not concur with Church Union into the United Church of Canada, met for prayer just before midnight in Knox Presbyterian Church (Toronto); not too far from the then-College Street Presbyterian Church, where the final sederunt of the 1925 General Assembly had concluded earlier in the day. Some 79 dissenting commissioners, and others equally concerned about the future of their church, had come to resume the General Assembly of the "continuing" Presbyterian Church that night. They were led by Rev. Dr. David George McQueen, a former moderator (1912) and longtime minister (1887–1930) of First Church (1881) in Edmonton, Alberta, who presided as moderator, and constituted the group into the "continuing" General Assembly of the Presbyterian Church in Canada. After adjourning early in the hours of June 10, they later reconvened as the General Assembly, and also met with others (including women's missionary groups) into a congress at St. Andrew's Church (Toronto); these two key Toronto congregations provided much of the input and support for the Presbyterian Church Association, in this fight against Church Union. Walter George Brown, another leading campaigner against union, was elected moderator in 1931.

The "continuing Presbyterians" title remained until 1939. The United Church of Canada Act expressly stipulated that the "Presbyterian Church of Canada" had ceased to exist, but the continuing Presbyterians continued to use the name and the act was amended in 1939 to recognize their right to do so. M. H. Ogilvie notes that

The continuing Presbyterians after 1925 had never doubted their right to be and to be called Presbyterians, regardless of the doctrine of Parliamentary Supremacy. Unlike the unionists, they clung to the inherited marks of Presbyterianism: the subordinate standard of the Westminster Confession of Faith, the Presbyterian polity of government by church courts and perhaps a dash of the Covenanting spirit.

About 30 percent of the former Presbyterians remained separate from the United Church at the time of the divide, although the actual vote remains uncertain.

In Western Canada, the losses, as well as many presbyteries and congregations, and missions, included all theological colleges:

In Winnipeg, Manitoba College, started in 1871 at Kildonan and moved into Winnipeg in 1874, began its theological studies with the aforementioned appointment of Dr. King in 1883. It merged with Wesley College in 1938 to become United College, and is now part of the University of Winnipeg.

In Vancouver, Westminster Hall (1908) was merged in 1927 with Ryerson College (Methodist) and the Congregational College of British Columbia to create United College, now part of Vancouver School of Theology (1971), located on the University of British Columbia (UBC) main campus. St. Andrew's Hall, part of the PCC's presence at UBC since 1956, formally joined with VST in 1984, and in 2006, the General Assembly approved concurrent programmes with Regent College.

In Edmonton, Alberta, Robertson College (1912) named after the aforementioned missions superintendent, merged with Alberta (Methodist) College to become St Stephen's College after 1925. It is located on the University of Alberta campus. In Saskatoon, the Presbyterian College, Saskatoon (1914), became St. Andrew's College in 1925. It is located on the University of Saskatchewan campus. In 2000 these latter colleges merged administratively, while remaining in both Saskatoon and Edmonton respectively, and become known as The College of St. Andrew's and St. Stephen's.

After 1925, the "rebuilding" was slowed in the 1930s by the Great Depression, and the Second World War. The period from 1945 saw expansion from urban growth and immigration, especially from Presbyterian strongholds such as Scotland and Ireland, as well as Presbyterian and Reformed Church members from the Netherlands, Hungary, and more recently, Taiwan, Ghana, and Korea, the latter for whom two separate "Han Ca" Korean Presbyteries (East and West) were established in 1997.

== Beliefs ==
Since 1966, the denomination has ordained women as both elders and ministers. By 2014 there were 362 female ministers and 3563 female elders representing 49.9% of the elders within the Church.

In 1998, the Presbyterian denomination prohibited gay and lesbian pastors and denied licenses to preach to these ministers; in 2012, however, that ban was lifted by the assembly. According to the Social Action Handbook, "The Presbyterian Church in Canada recognizes that homosexual orientation is not a sin." "The Presbyterian Church in Canada has never limited the roles of its members on the basis of their sexual orientation. These roles include church school teachers, musicians, youth leaders, ruling elders, teaching elders and members of the Order of Diaconal Ministries."

=== Marriage ===
In 2014, the Presbyteries of Waterloo-Wellington, Calgary, and East Toronto voted in favour of an overture asking the Presbyterian Church in Canada to permit the ordination of gay pastors and the blessing of same-sex marriages. In 2015, the General Assembly heard 6 overtures in favour of same-sex marriage and 15 overtures in opposition to same-sex unions. The moderator, the Rev. Karen Horst, has issued a pastoral letter calling for gracious and open discussion that listens to both sides of the debate.

At the 2016 General Assembly, the church referred reports on human sexuality to various committees. The Presbyteries of Calgary-Macleod, East Toronto, and Waterloo-Wellington submitted overtures asking the denomination to support same-sex unions and partnered gay and lesbian clergy. In 2017, the PCC created a committee, the "Rainbow Communion," to listen to LGBT members. The church also released a letter apologising for homophobia.

A 2021 resolution allows local churches to bless same-sex marriage.

== Missions and international partnerships ==
The Presbyterian Church in Canada has also had an international presence; besides congregations in Newfoundland before that province's entry into Canadian Confederation in 1949, St Andrew's in Hamilton, Bermuda was affiliated with the Maritime churches from 1842 to 1963, when its presbyterial oversight was transferred to the West Toronto Presbytery, and many congregations have people from many other nations and cultures that have come to Canada.

Foreign missionaries, or more recently, international partners, share the church's witness around the world. Before 1875, Atlantic Canada sent John Geddie and the Gordon Brothers (George N. and James D., both martyred) from Prince Edward Island to the New Hebrides, now called Vanuatu in the South Pacific; John Morton to Trinidad; and later, partners into neighbouring Demerara, part of present-day Guyana.

In 1871 the Canada Presbyterian Church sent George Leslie MacKay of Zorra Township, Oxford County, Ontario, to Formosa, which has been maintained to this date in connection with the Presbyterian Church in Taiwan. Fellow Oxford County native Jonathan Goforth initially went to Honan China starting the Canadian Presbyterian Mission there, Dr. John Buchannan into India, James Scarth Gale (sponsored by the YMCA) and Robert Grierson went to Korea, Japan saw Caroline Macdonald, "The White Angel of Tokyo" (YWCA), and after 1927, when Luther Lisgar Young and others partnered with The Korean Christian Church of Japan.

Some changes occurred after Church Union, as Goforth left Honan, to conclude his Asian Ministry in Manchuria, the aforementioned L.L. Young went from Korea into Japan. The later Pacific occupation by Japan, followed by Mao's "cultural revolution" in China, forced temporary and permanent departures from some Asian fields, including Taiwan, Japan, and Manchuria.

Since 1954, Nigeria, where Mary Slessor had pioneered a generation before with a Scottish Church, and whose story was well known in many Canadian congregations, opened the door for PCC service in Africa. Richard Fee, Moderator of the 130th General Assembly, held in Oshawa Ontario in June 2004, spent his early ministry in Nigeria, before assuming his Canadian role (1992–2005), first with Presbyterian World Service and Development, and now as General Secretary, Life and Mission Agency.

Malawi, Ghana, Kenya, Mozambique, Cameroon, Lesotho, and the Indian Ocean Island of Mauritius are other African nations that have also been partnered with the PCC, which also serves in Central America (Guyana is also included here, having been an offshoot of the Mission to Trinidad started by Nova Scotian Rev. John Morton in 1865), and more recently, in Eastern Europe, since the 1990s.

== Ecumenical relations ==
The Presbyterian Church in Canada has also been involved with relations between other Christian Churches. The World Communion of Reformed Churches was formed in 1875 (then known as the Alliance of the Reformed Churches holding the Presbyterian System), and was well represented by Canadians, who hosted the Fifth General Council in Toronto in 1892, as well as in Montreal in 1937 (recognized then as The Presbyterian Church of Canada), and Ottawa in 1982, when it was known as the World Alliance of Reformed Churches (name change in 1970 with addition of Congregationalists). The present name of the group represents another merger in 2010.

The Presbyterian Church in Canada was a charter member of both the Canadian Council of Churches and the World Council of Churches, in 1944 and 1948, respectively.

There is also "observer status" with the Evangelical Fellowship of Canada, although several congregations and individuals are actively involved in this venture.

Since 1939, relations with the United Church of Canada have improved, through involvement in ecumenical partnerships locally, nationally, and internationally. There are many congregations that will hold joint services during summer months, as well as other events such as Week of Prayer for Christian Unity, Women's Day of Prayer, Holy Week services, and in local outreaches, such as food banks, homeless shelters, and cropshares.

== Further details (polity) ==
At present the Presbyterian Church in Canada has about 1000 congregations across the country. As a result of early settlement, as well as post WWII urbanization, and resistance to the 1925 church union, Southern Ontario has the greatest number of congregations, presbyteries and synods (listed above).

The General Assembly, held yearly since 1875 around the first week of June, has recently been held in a number of centres throughout Southern Ontario and Quebec. The number of delegates or commissioners to the General Assembly is determined by one-sixth of the ministers on the presbytery roll and an equal number of elders being commissioned, in rotation from every congregation or pastoral charge. There are also young adult representatives, selected from every second presbytery on the roll, and student representatives, representing the theological colleges.

Every decade, there is an attempt to hold the General Assembly in other parts of the Country: On June 5, 2005, First Presbyterian Church in Edmonton, was the location of the Opening of the 131st General Assembly of The Presbyterian Church in Canada; the 'Reverend Jean Morris, of Calgary, Alberta was Moderator of the 131st General Assembly in 2005; her father, Rev. Dr. J.J. Harrold Morris was moderator in 1989, and grew up in the First Congregation. She was awarded a Doctor of Divinity from Vancouver School of Theology in 2010.

In 1996, Charlottetown PEI was the host, as was Vancouver BC, in both 1957 and 1989, Halifax NS, in 1971, and Calgary in 1948. The Presbytery of Cape Breton, Nova Scotia were gracious hosts in June 2010.

From June 4–9, 2006, the 132nd General Assembly took place in St. Catharines, Ontario, at Brock University, an alma mater (1982) of the outgoing Moderator. The official nominees for the 2006 Moderator were two laypeople; voting for Moderator was conducted by all active Ministers (on their Presbytery Roll) and Representative Elders in their respective Presbyteries. The tally of votes was counted and announced on April 3, a change from most years, when this is conducted on April 1. The now past Moderator is Wilma Welsh, an Elder from Guelph, Ontario, a former Mission Partner with the Presbyterian Church in Taiwan, and Staff Associate in the Life and Mission Agency offices in Toronto (Awarded Doctor of Divinity from Knox College in 2010). Invitations for the 2007 and 2008 General Assemblies were approved from two Ontario Presbyteries. The 2007 Assembly was held June 3–8 at the University of Waterloo, with the opening service in nearby Cambridge. Rev. Dr. J. Hans Kouwenberg, Senior Pastor of Calvin Presbyterian Church in Abbotsford, British Columbia, was Moderator. The 2008 Assembly was held in Ottawa, the opening service held in Knox Church. The Moderator was Rev. Cheol Soon Park, then Senior Minister of Toronto Korean Presbyterian Church , the first Korean-Canadian Moderator of the PCC. In 2009, General Assembly was held in Hamilton, Ontario, Rev. Harvey Self, of Tweedsmuir Presbyterian Church, Orangeville, Ontario, was Moderator; he was a former Military Chaplain. In 2010, the General Assembly was held in Sydney, Nova Scotia; the first time ever on Cape Breton Island. Rev. Dr. Herbert F. Gale, of Guelph, Ontario, Associate Secretary of Planned Giving was chosen as Moderator. The 2011 General Assembly was held in London, Ontario.

There are congregations, missions, and preaching points in each Canadian province, as well as the aforementioned St Andrew's Church in Hamilton, Bermuda.

== Communication ==
Communication has been an important role in the Presbyterian Church in Canada. Before 1875, every group had some sort of journal for communication, as well as active contributions in the mainstream press.

In January 1876, the Presbyterian Record, a merger of the Church of Scotland's The Presbyterian (since 1848), and the Canada Presbyterian Church's Record (and its predecessors in the United Presbyterian and Free Church), began operations that continue monthly until 2016 when the Presbyterian Record was replaced by The Presbyterian Connection, a quarterly newspaper, and PCConnect a monthly e-newsletter.

There is also Glad Tidings, the publication of the Women's Missionary Society (formerly WMS Western Division) publishing since 1925, and the Presbyterian Message, from the Atlantic Missionary Society (formerly W.M.S. Eastern Division); and Presbyterian History, Newsletter of the Committee of History, has published regularly since 1957.

Channels, a regular print publication from 1983 to 2007, is from the Renewal Fellowship Within the Presbyterian Church in Canada.

== See also ==
- Protestantism in Canada
- Christianity in Canada
- Religion in Canada
