= New Circadia =

Temporary installation at the University of Toronto

New Circadia (adventures in mental spelunking)
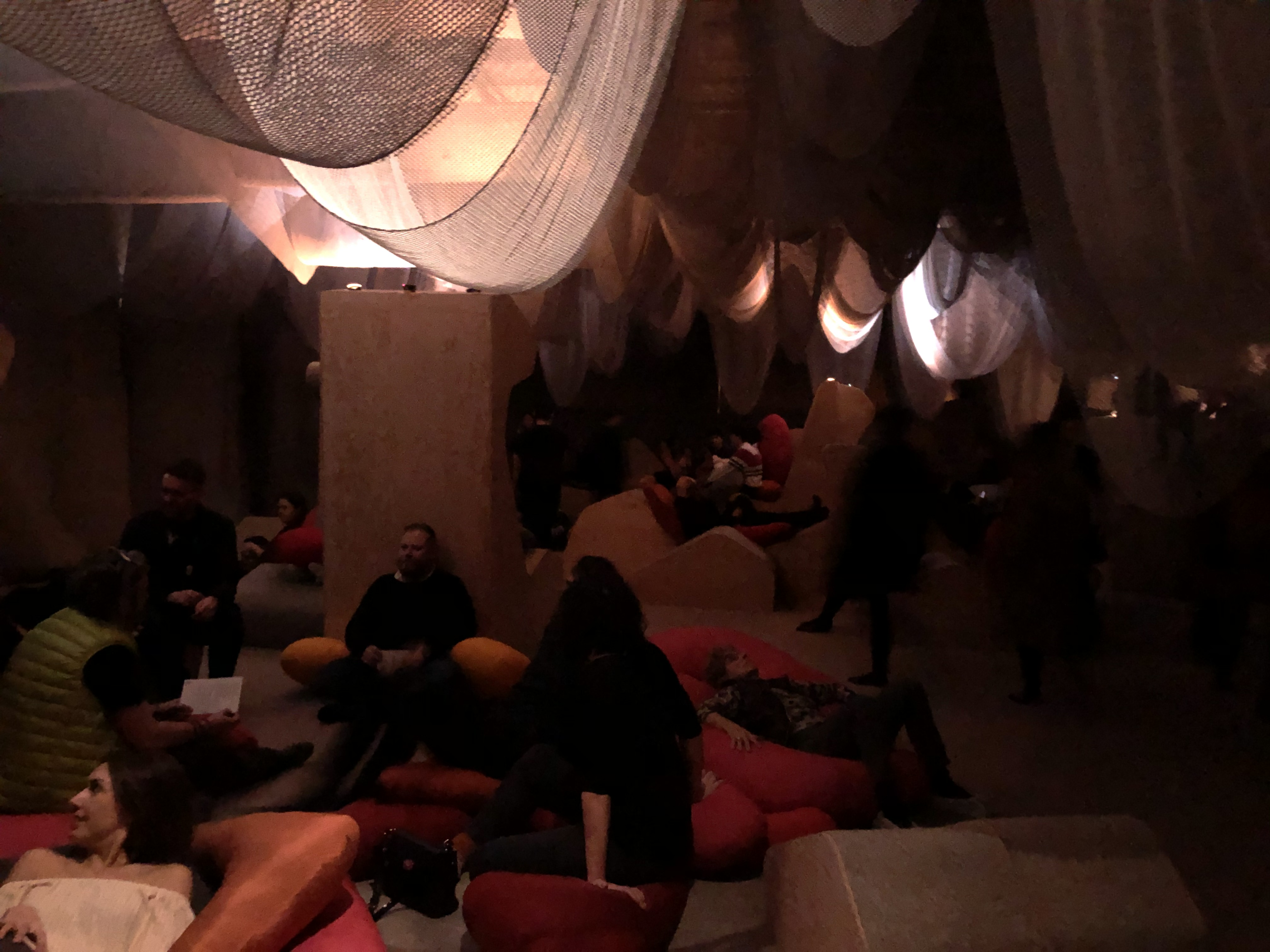
- View of the New Circadia installation in use
- Date: Launched November 7, 2019
- Venue: Architecture and Design Gallery, 1 Spadina Crescent, Toronto
- Also known as: New Circadia
- Patron: Lorne M. Gertner Fund
- Organised by: John H. Daniels Faculty of Architecture, Landscape, and Design

New Circadia (adventures in mental spelunking) was an installation at the University of Toronto's John H. Daniels Faculty of Architecture, Landscape, and Design. The installation, which opened on November 7, 2019 and ran through April 2020, was the first exhibition to take place at the Faculty’s Architecture and Design Gallery, located in the lower level of 1 Spadina Crescent. While on display the installation was free and open to the public six days a week. The title New Circadia is a play on the Latin word for daily cycle.

== Background ==
Designed and curated by Daniels Faculty Dean Richard M. Sommer with Natalie Fizer and Emily Stephenson from the New York based studio Pillow Culture, the intent of the installation was to create a space designed specifically for visitors to disconnect from technology, and re-connect with their circadian rhythm. Inspired by Nathaniel Kleitman's 1938 Mammoth Cave Experiment which investigated sleep and wakefulness, it presented an immersive, cave-like environment. In addition to the physical installation, the Architecture and Design Gallery hosted a series of free public programs related to the installation including performances, talks, and film screenings.

== Details ==
The installation began on the main floor where didactic texts described different cycles of time and the nature of sleep. There were three additional zones in the lower level: the Transitory zone, the Dark zone, and Oneroi. The Transitory zone was a 72-ft long hallway where visitors had to take off their shoes and store their belongings before entering the cave. This zone was lit from above by artificial skylights created by lighting designer Conor Sampson. Here visitors could make use of "spelunking gear" - unusually shaped red, yellow, and purple pillows designed by Natalie Fizer and Emily Stevenson from Pillow Culture. Passing through a felt curtain, the main cave/Dark zone was scattered with large felted loungers meant to evoke rock-like formations. The area was dimly lit and covered in over 6,000 yards of felt meant to dampen sound. The loungers included built-in speakers that emitted soft humming and wave-like noises created by an assistant professor at the Daniels Faculty, Mitchell Akiyama. The third zone, Oneroi, was created by U of T Daniels Assistant Professor Petros Babasikas and artist Chrissou Voulgari. Oneroi consisted of more secluded, curtained areas in the upper mezzanine of the cave where visitors could either create an audio recording of their dreams or listen to previously recorded dreams of others.
