= Green Roof Innovation Testing Laboratory =

University of Toronto research facility

Coordinates: 43°39′35″N 79°24′03″W

The Green Roof Innovation Testing Lab ("GRIT Lab") is a University of Toronto research facility at the John H. Daniels Faculty for Architecture, Landscape and Design. The only facility of its kind in Canada, the GRIT Lab tests and researches the environmental performance of green roofs, green walls, and solar photovoltaic technologies in Canada to help mitigate climate change.

The GRIT Lab is run by a team of landscape architects, civil engineers, building scientists, and biologists from the U of T Daniels Faculty, including Director Liat Margolis as well as professors Robert Wright, Dr. Ted Kesik, Dr. Brent Sleep and Jennifer Drake.

Related industry partners such as Tremco, Bioroof Systems, and Sky Solar, as well as government agencies including the City of Toronto, and other academic institutions are also involved in the project.

== History ==
The GRIT Lab was established in 2010 on the roof of the Daniels Faculty at 230 College Street in Toronto by the Daniels Faculty's Centre for Landscape Research. The opening of the lab came after the City of Toronto introduced a by-law in May 2009 that required all new developments in the city larger than 2,000 square meters to incorporate a certain percentage of green roof space.

Operations began in 2011 to monitor the performance of the city's recommendations. This is done by testing the effectiveness of various green roofs, green walls, and solar photovoltaic technologies in the Toronto climate. The experiments aim to reveal the optimal construction of green roofs and how to maximize environmental performance.

In addition to testing, the lab also offers private educational seminars to related organizations and those interested in green-thinking.

To date, the GRIT Lab consists of 48 boxed plant testing beds, a variety of green walls, and its own weather station. Data is regularly collected on soil moisture, flow rates, temperature, rainfall, humidity, solar, and wind to determine which combinations can produce the greatest cooling and stormwater benefit.

In 2013, a website was established to share the results of the lab's research with the public.

In 2017, the lab moved from College Street to the fifth floor roof of the Daniels Faculty's new home at 1 Spadina Crescent. The new lab at 1 Spadina focuses on both testing the absorptive qualities of green roofs, as well as the effectiveness of cisterns or holding tanks at keeping rainwater out of storm sewers and the ground.

== Awards ==
In 2013 the GRIT Lab received an Award of Excellence from the American Society of Landscape Architects.
