= Spadina Avenue =

Thoroughfare in Toronto, Ontario

Coordinates: 43.6525°N 79.398°W

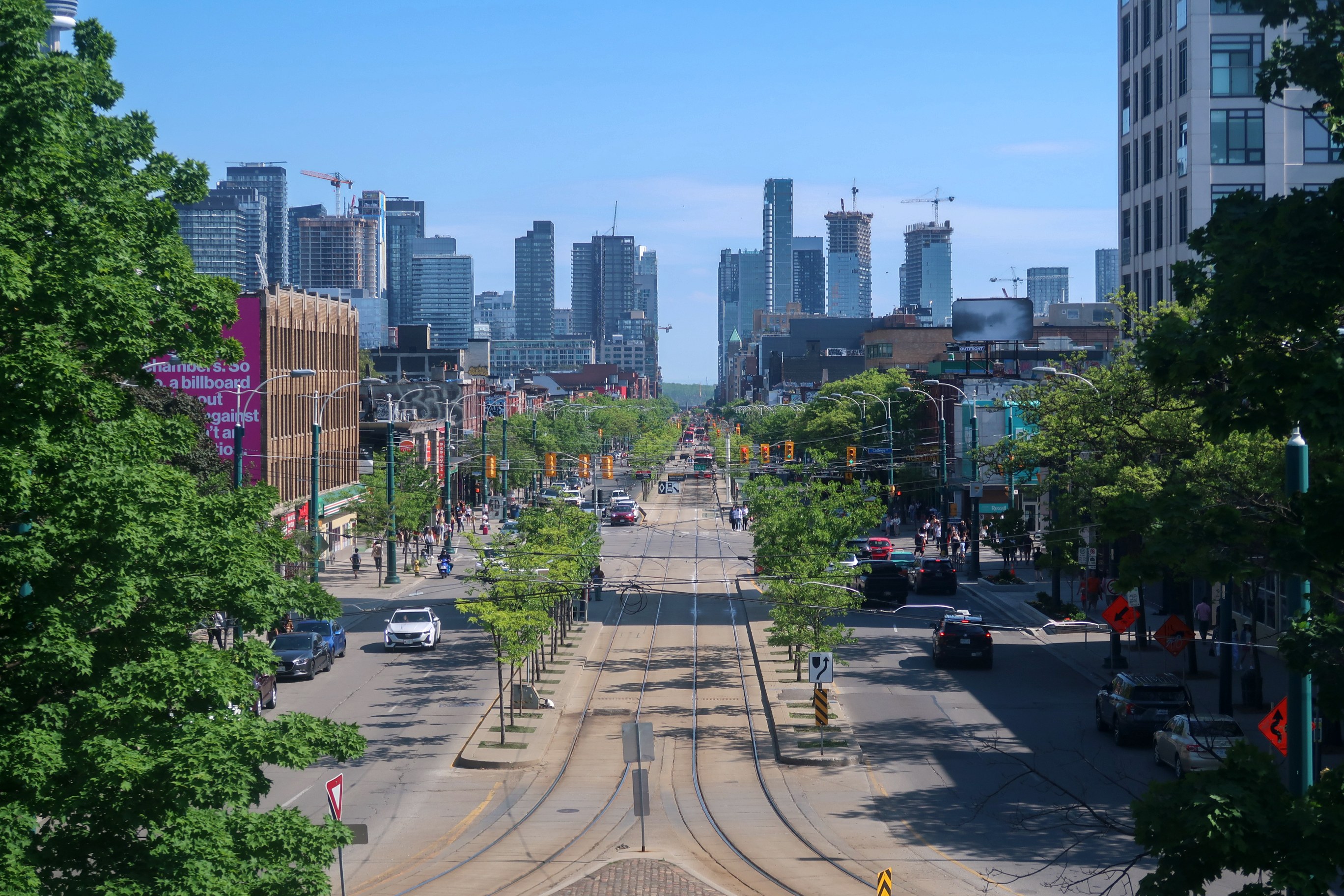
- Spadina Avenue, looking south from its intersection with the Daniels Building

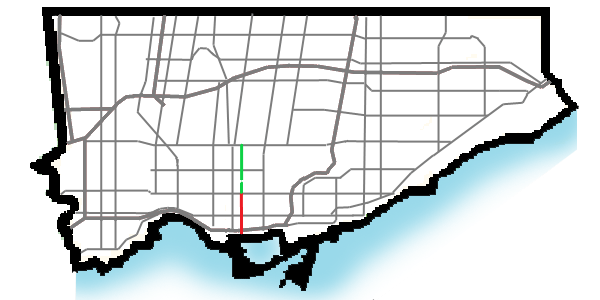
- Spadina Avenue in red
- Maintained by: City of Toronto government
- Length: 3.3 km (2.1 mi)
- South end: Queens Quay
- Major junctions: King Street; Queen Street
- North end: Bloor Street (continues as Spadina Road)

Other
Nearby arterial roads in Toronto
← Bathurst Street	Avenue Road →

Spadina Road
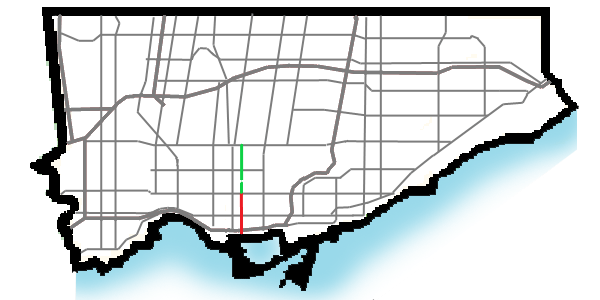
- Spadina Road in green
- Interactive map of Spadina Road
- Maintained by: City of Toronto government
- South end: Bloor Street (continues as Spadina Avenue)
- Major junctions: Dupont Street; St. Clair Avenue
- North end: Eglinton Avenue

Other
Nearby arterial roads in Toronto
← Bathurst Street	University Avenue →

Spadina Avenue (/spəˈdaɪnə/, less commonly /spəˈdiːnə/) is one of the most prominent streets in Toronto, Ontario, Canada. Running through the western section of downtown, the road has a very different character in different neighbourhoods.

Spadina Avenue runs south from Bloor Street to the Gardiner Expressway, just north of Lake Ontario. Lower Spadina Avenue continues the last block to the lake after the Gardiner. North of Bloor Street, the physical street continues as Spadina Road and this has new street address numbering starting over at zero. For much of its extent, Spadina Road is a less busy residential road (especially north of Dupont Street and the railway track underpass) than Spadina Avenue.

== Etymology ==
Spadina Avenue is commonly pronounced with the i as /aɪ/ as in mine; the Spadina House museum on Spadina Road is always pronounced with the i as /iː/ as in ski. The name originated under the latter pronunciation, with the former a colloquialism that evolved as Spadina Avenue was extended from the wealthy neighbourhoods north of Bloor into the more working-class and immigrant areas to the south; for many years, the pronunciation difference served as a class marker. The /aɪ/ variation is now predominant among most Torontonians, to the point that in 2011 a minor controversy emerged when the Toronto Transit Commission's new automated announcement system pronounced the upcoming subway stop with /iː/.

The name originates from the Ojibwa word ishpadinaa, meaning "high place/ridge" or "sudden rise in the land." The Ishpatina Ridge, in Northern Ontario, which is the highest point of land in the province of Ontario, and the city of Ishpeming, in the state of Michigan's Upper Peninsula in Marquette County both derive their name from the same preverb.

== History ==
Spadina was the original name of the street from Bloor Street to Queen Street West, built by Dr. William Baldwin beginning in 1815. The street's name did not appear in published maps until 1834. The southern portion was named Brock Street (first appearing around 1837) and remained so until after 1884. Brock Street was named in honour of Sir Isaac Brock. Baldwin designed the original Spadina, choosing its extra large width and placing the circle that is today 1 Spadina Crescent. He named the connecting Baldwin Street after himself, and Phoebe Street to the south was named after his wife Phoebe Baldwin.

For a number of decades, Spadina Avenue and nearby Kensington Market were the centre of Jewish life in Toronto with the area around Spadina being the home of the garment district—where many Jews worked—as well as numerous Jewish delis, tailors, bookstores, cinemas, Yiddish theatres, synagogues and other political, social and cultural institutions. In the 1950s and 1960s, the Jewish community moved north along Bathurst Street, but signs of Spadina's Jewish history can still be found in many locations. The city's Chinatown moved west along Dundas onto Spadina when much of the original Chinatown was expropriated to build Toronto's new City Hall and Nathan Phillips Square.

== Street description ==
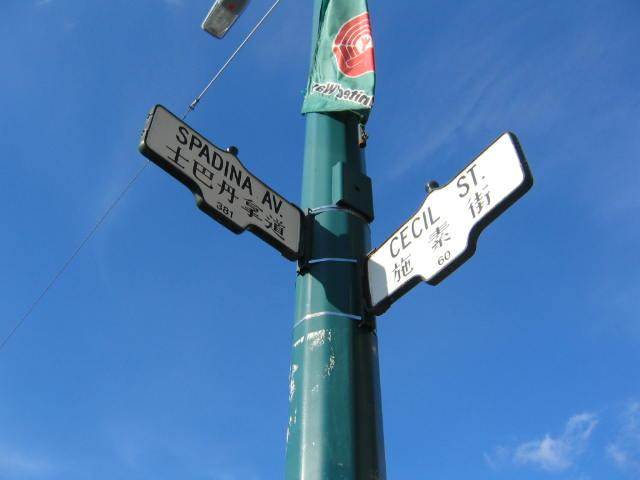
Spadina and Cecil intersection, street signs

Most of the section known as Spadina Avenue is a six-lane urban arterial (four lanes for cars, two dedicated right-of-way lanes for a streetcar running down the middle) with a speed limit of 50 km/h (30 mph), although it is unposted. The section known as Spadina Road is a two- to four-lane collector road with speed limits alternating between 40 and 50 km/h (25–30 mph).

The 77 Spadina bus route inspired a song, "Spadina Bus", which became a surprise Top 40 hit in Canada for the jazz fusion band The Shuffle Demons in 1986. In the 1990s, however, the TTC rebuilt and reinstated the 510 Spadina streetcar line, which runs largely in a dedicated right-of-way along the median strip of the street since its opening in 1997. Prior to the construction of the Spadina LRT, streetcars ran down the street until it was replaced by the 77 Spadina bus. Bricked road bed was used along the streetcar route. Small sections of the brick road bed remained until the LRT was constructed.

In the 1960s, city hall was planning to tear up Spadina and most of the buildings on either side to construct the Spadina Expressway, a proposed highway that would have run straight into downtown. After a long public battle, with the opposition to the project led by Toronto urban writer Jane Jacobs and former Toronto mayor John Sewell, the plans were halted in 1971.

In 2006, the Forest Hill Jewish Centre announced plans to rebuild the façade of the Great Synagogue of Jasło, Poland, which was destroyed by the German Army in World War II, as the façade of its new building on Spadina Road, a project that was completed by 2015.

=== Route ===
==== Lake Shore to Queen Street ====
The southern section of Spadina was the heart of Toronto's industrial area for most of the 20th century, but in the 1970s, most of the factories left. Most of the land south of Front Street is infill on Lake Ontario. The Rogers Centre (formerly the SkyDome) was opened just east of Spadina in 1989. This area was previously the site of the CNR Spadina Roundhouse. Some land along this portion of Spadina has also been redeveloped into the condominium tower complex of CityPlace. The road once crossed the railway lands with a pony truss bridge built in 1926-1927 (replacing an early single lane truss bridge), which was replaced with the current Box girder bridge in the 1990s.

More recently, a number of tower buildings are being built or have been planned. Concord Canada House at 23 Spadina will have 74 stories, The Well at Front Street will have 46 stories and The Taylor at 57 Spadina will have 36 stories. In 2021, new residential tower buildings were proposed for the corners at Adelaide and Richmond.

From Front Street, Spadina runs through the Fashion District and along the western edge of the Entertainment District, which also contains a number of office buildings.

==== Queen Street to College Street ====
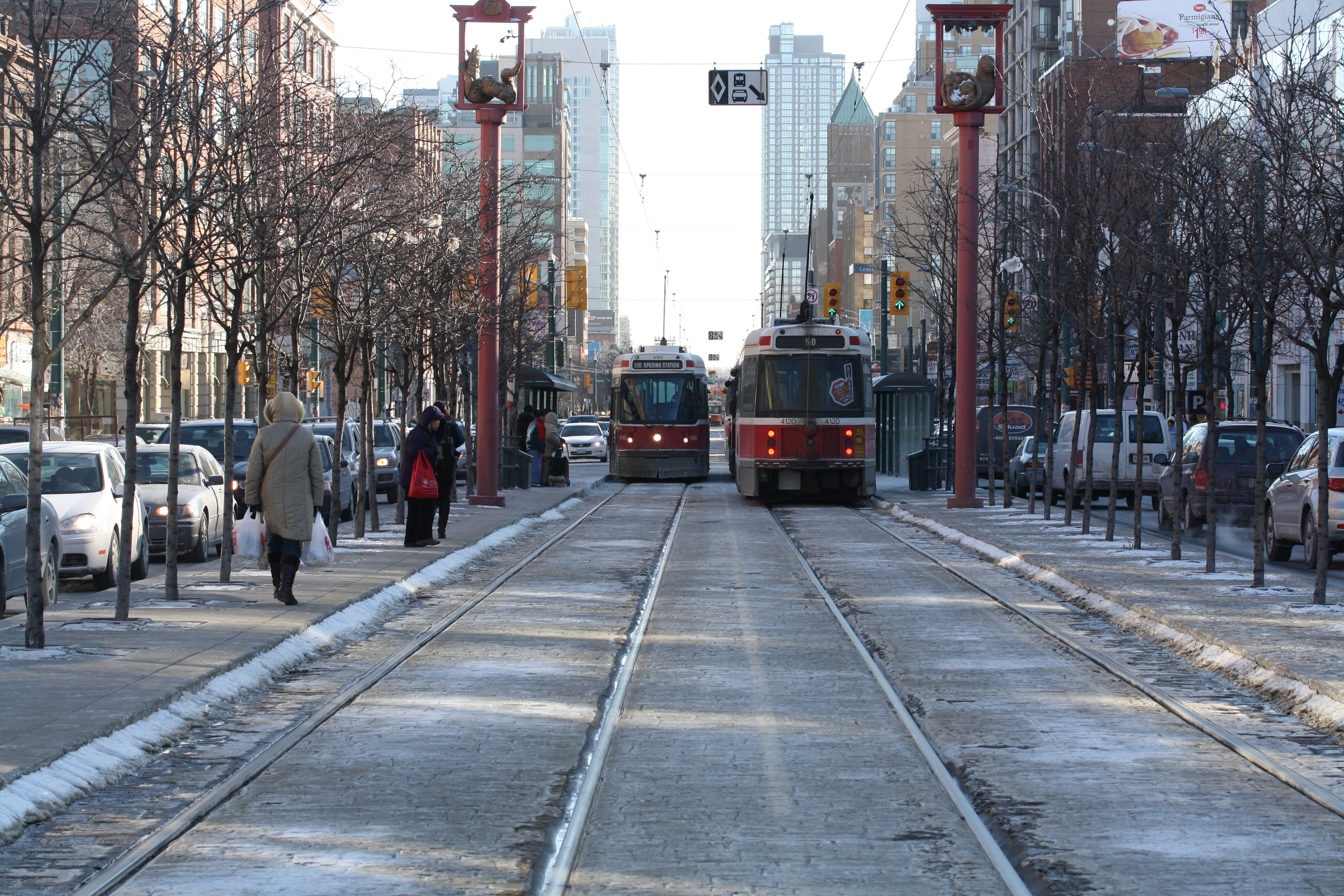
Spadina Avenue in Downtown Toronto

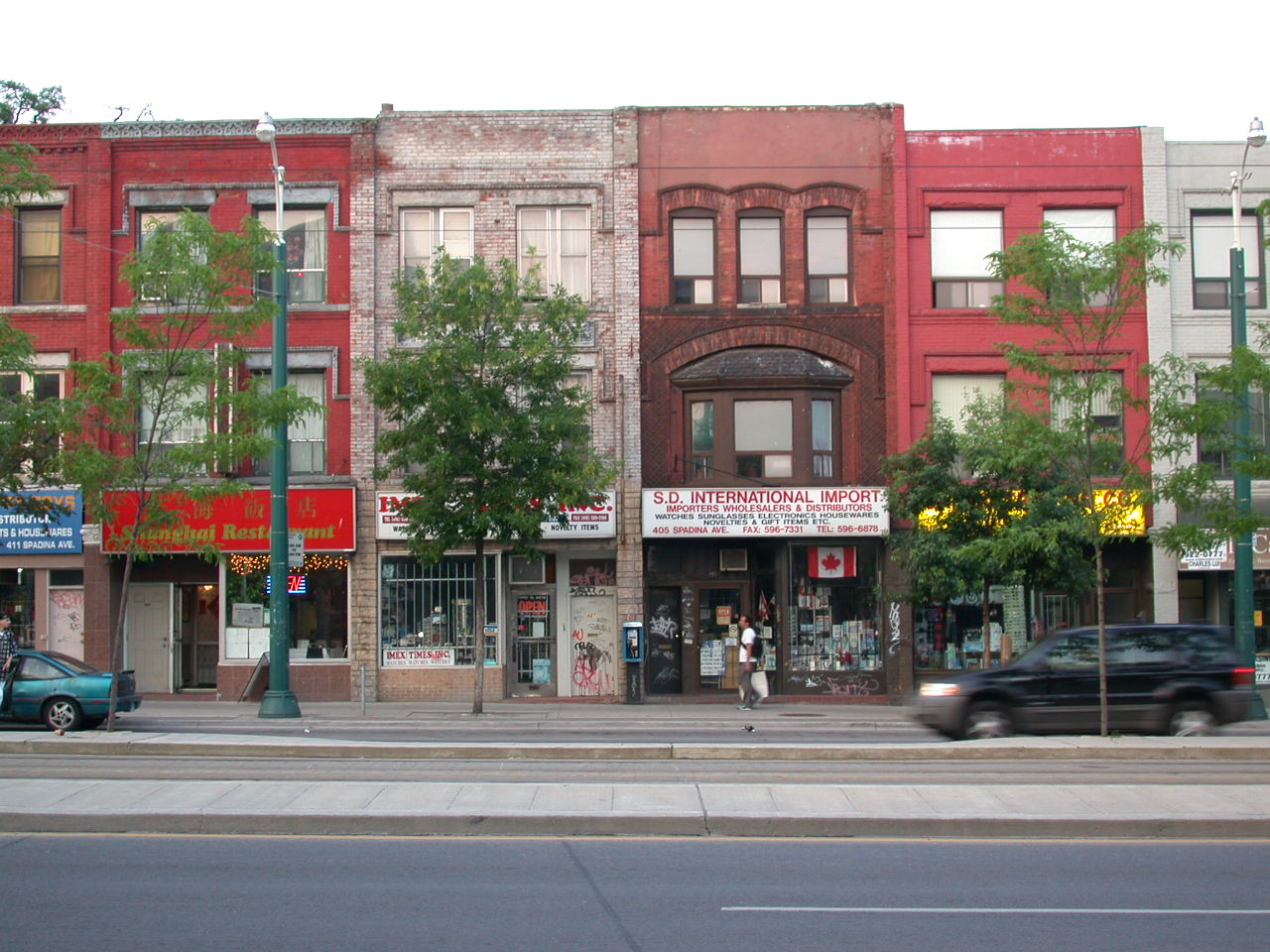
A view of Chinatown on Spadina Avenue north of Dundas Street

North of Queen Street West, the avenue passes along the eastern side of the Alexandra Park neighbourhood, which is made up of a number of public housing projects.

The intersection of Dundas Street West and Spadina is the centre of Toronto's second-oldest Chinatown (the oldest was located at Dundas and Elizabeth Streets), with many restaurants and shops catering to the Chinese community. The Chinese Spadina began in the 1970s after the departure of Jewish Toronto (1920s to 1960s) from the area. It supplanted an older Chinatown centred on Dundas Street West and Elizabeth Street, which was disrupted when New City Hall was constructed in the early 1960s.

Just west of the avenue in this area is the famed Kensington Market. The famous Shopsy's Deli was on Spadina north of Dundas Street, but it moved and burned down in the 1980s.

The intersection of Spadina Avenue and College Street is known as an inexpensive place to buy electronics, with a number of independent stores in the area. It is also the location of the El Mocambo, where the Rolling Stones performed one night to a small audience that included the wife of Prime Minister Pierre Trudeau.

==== College Street to Bloor Street ====
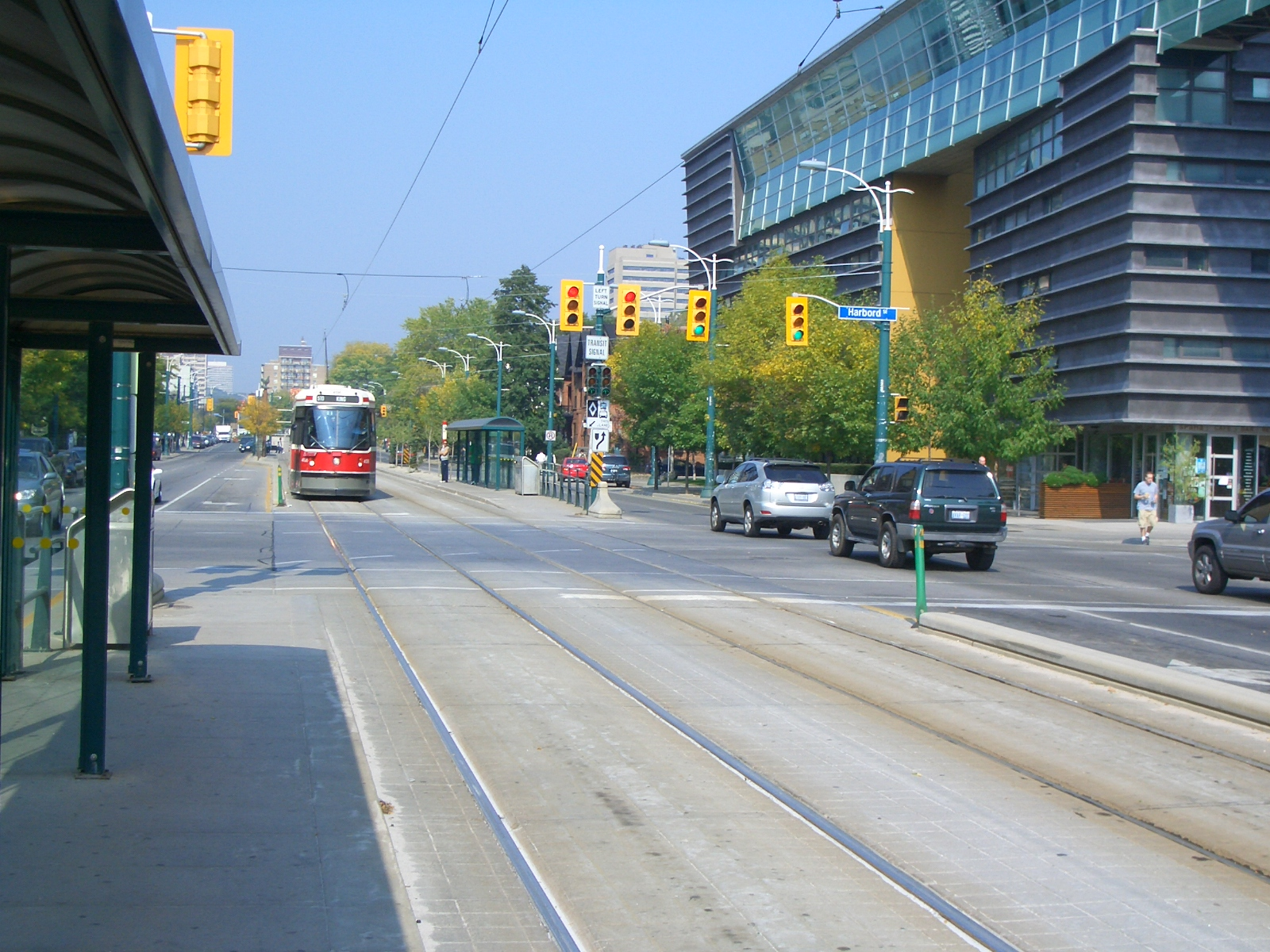
Spadina Avenue and Harbord Street

North of College Street, the avenue forms the western border of the University of Toronto St. George campus and is home to several businesses catering to students, as well as university facilities such as the Athletic Centre and a number of student residences such as University of Toronto Graduate House. Just north of College Street, the roadway splits into a traffic circle, called Spadina Crescent. The building in the centre of the circle was originally built as Knox College, but it was renovated in 2017 to become the Daniels Building, which houses the Faculty of Architecture.

==== Spadina Road ====
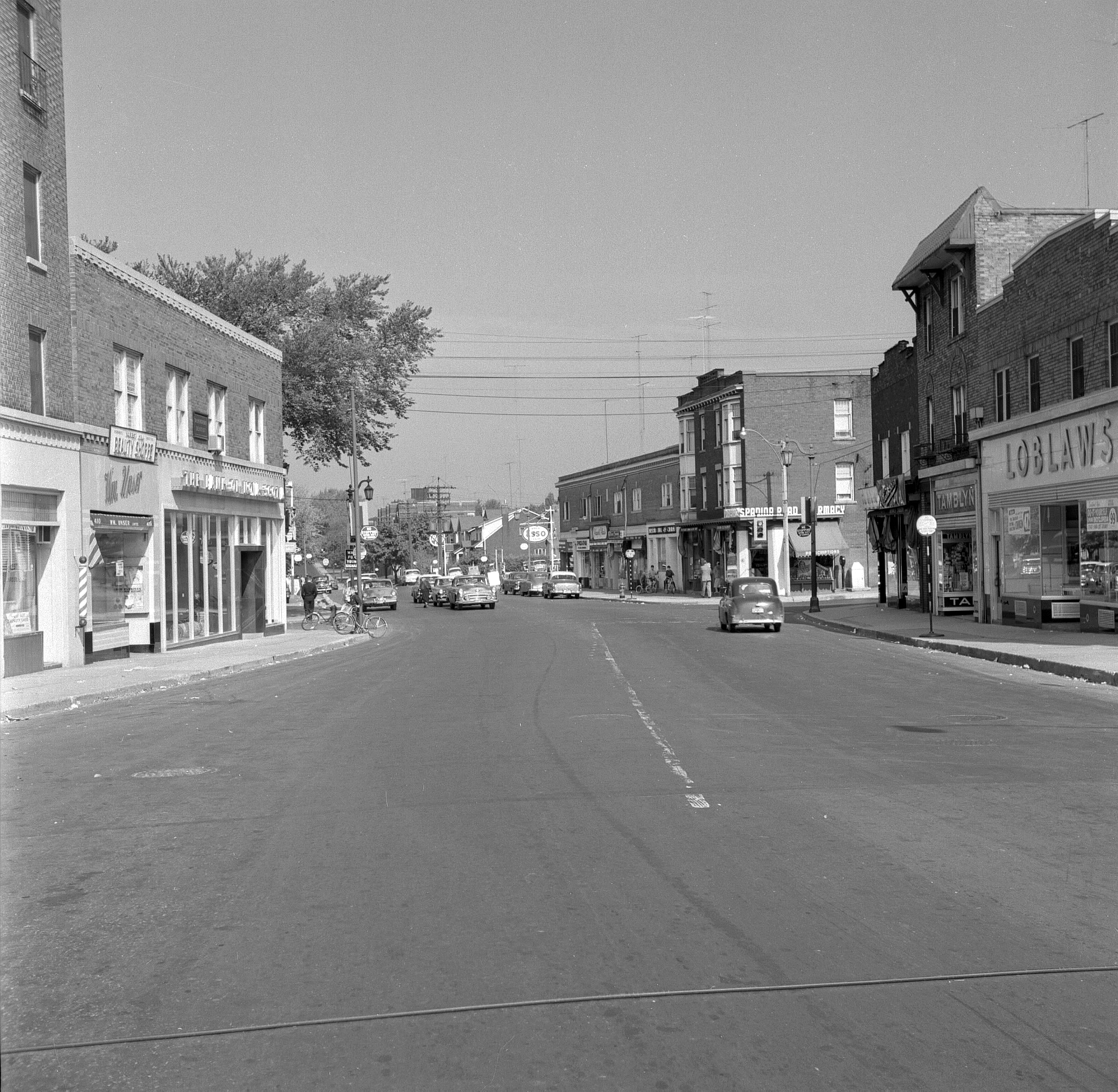
Spadina Road, 1955

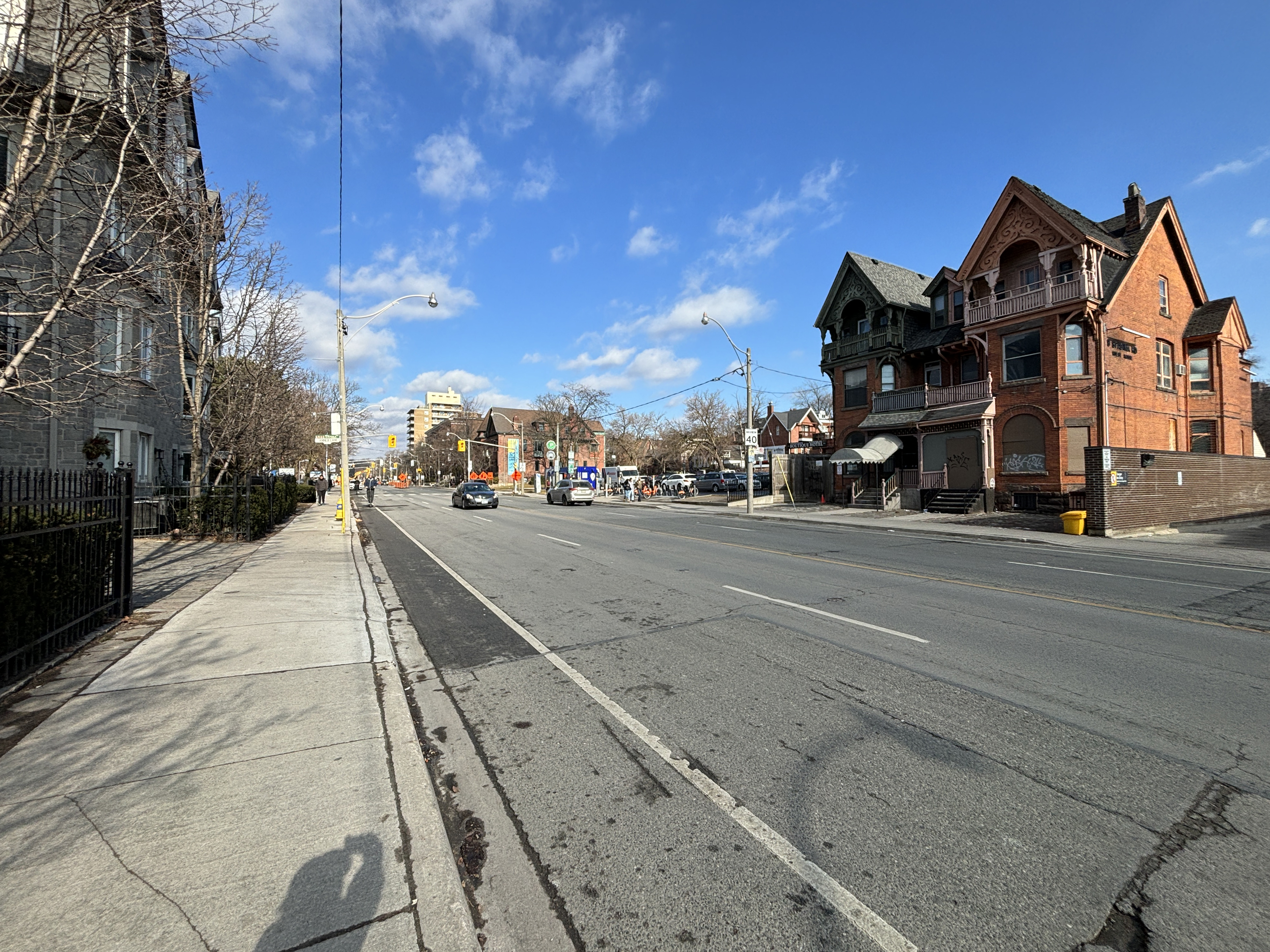
Spadina Road view to north, 2024

North of Bloor Street, Spadina Avenue gives way to Spadina Road. Here the street passes through the upper-middle-class neighbourhood known as The Annex. For this stretch of the road, Line 1 Yonge–University passes underneath. Two stations, Spadina and Dupont, are under it.

Spadina Road is interrupted just north of Dupont Street by an escarpment, Davenport Hill. The two sections require traffic to divert via Davenport Road, Walmer Road and Austin Terrace. There is a flight of stairs called "Baldwin Steps" and walkway in Spadina Park between the two sections of Spadina Road. Spadina Road continues atop this escarpment in front of Spadina House, one of Toronto's largest mansions. Casa Loma is also nearby. The house and the street are named after the escarpment, the word ishpadinaa meaning "[it is a] hill" or "rise" in the Ojibwe language. Spadina Road continues north through the wealthy neighbourhood of Forest Hill. Starting north of St. Clair Avenue and continuing a few blocks further north is lower Forest Hill Village, which forms the main street of a small commercial area, the historical downtown of Forest Hill before Toronto grew around the town. Forest Hill continues to just north of Eglinton Avenue. The street continues north through this green, rolling residential neighbourhood. This stretch is served by the 33 Forest Hill bus route.

North of Eglinton Avenue, Spadina Road is again interrupted, here by the trenched right-of-way for the defunct Belt Line Railway, now a popular walking trail. It briefly resumes north of Eglinton, and ends at New Haven Drive (1100 Spadina Road – Northern Preparatory Junior Public School – Toronto District School Board). To access the section north of Eglinton traffic diverts via Eglinton Avenue and Chaplin Crescent. The road ends at New Haven Drive next to Northern Preparatory Jr Public School.

== Landmarks ==
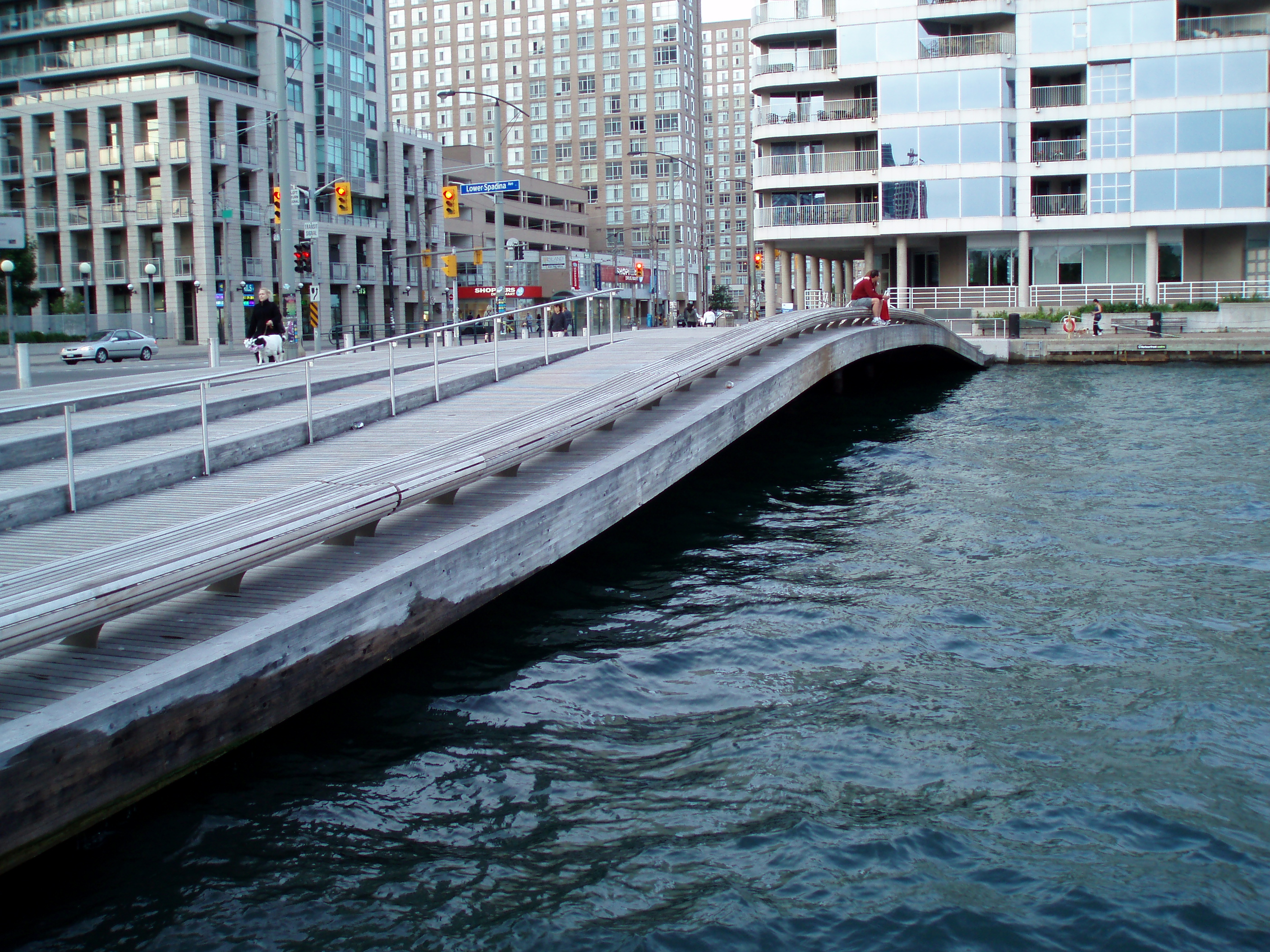
Waterfront WaveDecks

- 1 Spadina Crescent — Knox College (1875–1914)
- El Mocambo
- Knox Presbyterian Church
- The Scott Mission
- Standard Theatre — later as the Victory Burlesque, Golden Harvest and lastly Mandarin; it is now a dollar store (stair portion only) and RBC branch (main level)
- University of Toronto Athletic Centre

=== Demolished landmarks ===
- Broadway Methodist Tabernacle
- Hotel Waverly
- The Globe and Mail

== See also ==
- History of the Jews in Toronto
