= Richard M. Sommer =

Richard Sommer
- Education: Harvard University; Rhode Island School of Design
- Occupations: Director, Global Cities Institute, University of Toronto, Professor (Dean Emeritus), John H. Daniels Faculty of Architecture, Landscape, and Design at the University of Toronto
- Spouse: Laura Miller
- Children: 3

Richard M. Sommer is a Professor of Architecture and Urbanism and the Director of the Global Cities Institute at the John H. Daniels Faculty of Architecture, Landscape, and Design, University of Toronto. From 2009 until 2020, he was the Dean of the Daniels Faculty. Sommer was born in Philadelphia, and now resides in Toronto, Canada. Trained as an architect and urbanist, Sommer is a leader in architectural education and is a designer and scholar of the built environment.

== Career ==
As Director of the Global Cities Institute at Daniels Faculty, Sommer co-curated the study and exhibitions with Michael Piper, Housing Multitudes: Reimagining the Landscapes of Suburbia held at the Daniels Architecture and Design Gallery and at the World Urban Pavilion at Regent Park in 2023. Housing Multitudes features work by University of Toronto faculty, students and local architectural practice, LGA Architectural Partners, proposing solutions for how suburban geography can evolve to accommodate additional housing and also contribute to a more social and sustainable future.

Whilst serving as Dean of the Daniels Faculty, Sommer led the transformation of 1 Spadina Crescent into the Daniels Building, designed by NADAAA. The project won numerous awards including a Toronto Urban Design Award. Sommers expanded the Daniels Faculty, adding five new programs including a renewed undergraduate program in Architectural Studies, a PhD in Architecture, Landscape, and Design, and amalgamating University of Toronto's programs in Art/Visual Studies and Forestry. Sommer co-curated, with Pillow Culture NYC, the inaugural exhibition at the Architecture and Design Gallery, New Circadia (Adventures in mental spelunking) based on ongoing research on the democratic potential of collective spaces of idling, dream sharing and rest.

Before he was appointed Dean at the Daniels Faculty, Sommer was a member of the faculty at the Harvard Graduate School of Design for eleven years, and served as Director of the school's Urban Design programs. He has held several other academic appointments including the O’Hare Chair/Visiting American Scholar at Ulster University, Scholar-in-Residence at the California College of the Arts, as well as visiting professorships at the Cooper Union, KU Leuven, Washington University in St. Louis, Columbia University and Iowa State University. In 1995 he co-founded a design practice: borfax/B.L.U.

Sommer has served as a visiting critic and lectured internationally.

== Education ==
Sommer received a Bachelor of Architecture and a Bachelor of Fine Arts from Rhode Island School of Design, and a Master of Architecture at Harvard Graduate School of Design, where the architect Jose Rafael Moneo served as his thesis advisor.

== Awards ==
In 2020 Sommer received a Distinguished Professor Award from The Association of Collegiate Schools of Architecture. In 1994 he was awarded Harvard's Arthur W. Wheelwright Traveling Fellowship (now called the Wheelwright Prize). In 1991 he received the Legislative Award for Teaching Excellence from Iowa State University.

Sommer's research has been supported by awards and grants including the National Endowment for the Arts, the LEF Foundation, the Wheelwright Fellowship, the Tozier Fund and the Graham Foundation for Advanced Studies in the Fine Arts.

== Key Writings ==
- Sommer, Richard & Fizer, Natalie. (2020) “Glossary of Dream Architecture: Genus for a New Circadia” in Cabinet, Issue 67 / Dreams, Spring 2019–Winter 2020 (New York/ Berlin).
- Sommer, Richard. (2017) “A Secular Cathedral of Art: Frank O. Gehry’s Guggenheim, Bilbao” in The Blackwell Companion to Modern Architecture, Twentieth Century, D. Leatherbarrow and A. Eisenschmidt, eds. (Wiley Publishing).
- Sommer, Richard. (2013) “Beyond Centers, Fabric and the Culture of Congestion: Urban Design as a Metropolitan Enterprise” in Urban Design, (Minnesota University Press).
- Sommer, Richard. (2013) “The Urban Design of Philadelphia: Taking the Towne for the City” in Shaping the City: Studies in History, Theory and Urban Design, (London: Spon/Routledge Press).
- Sommer, Richard & Forley, Glenn. (2013) “The Democratic Monument: The Reframing of History as Heritage” in D. Gobel, et al, Eds., Commemoration and the American City: Monuments, Memorialization and Meaning (University of Virginia Press).
- Sommer, Richard & Forley, Glenn. (2011) “Highway Beautiful: The March from Selma to Montgomery” in Critical/Productive, a Journal of Architecture, Urbanism and Cultural Theory, Vol 1.1: Theoretic Action (University of Michigan).
- Sommer, Richard & Forley, Glenn. (2008) “Dyn-o-mite Fiends: The Weather Underground's Action at Haymarket” co-authored with Glenn Forley, in Collateral Damage: War & Architecture, Journal of Architectural Education Special Issue, 62:3 (Blackwell).
- Sommer, Richard & Forley, Glenn. (2007) "The Democratic Monument in America: A Twentieth-Century Topography" (Cambridge: President and Fellows of Harvard University).
- Sommer, Richard & Jones, M.M. (2004) "Supernatural Urbanism: The Los Angeles River Studio", Eds. (Cambridge: Harvard Design School Press).
- Sommer, Richard. (2001) “Four Stops Along an Architecture of Post-War America” in Perspecta Vol. 32, The Yale Journal of Architecture, (Cambridge: MIT Press).
- Sommer, Richard. (1999) “Time Incorporated: The Romantic Life of the Modern Monument” Harvard Design Magazine, Number 9. (Cambridge: President and Fellows of Harvard University).

== See also ==
- University of Toronto
- John H. Daniels Faculty of Architecture, Landscape, and Design
- New Circadia
