= Daniels Building =

Building at the University of Toronto St. George

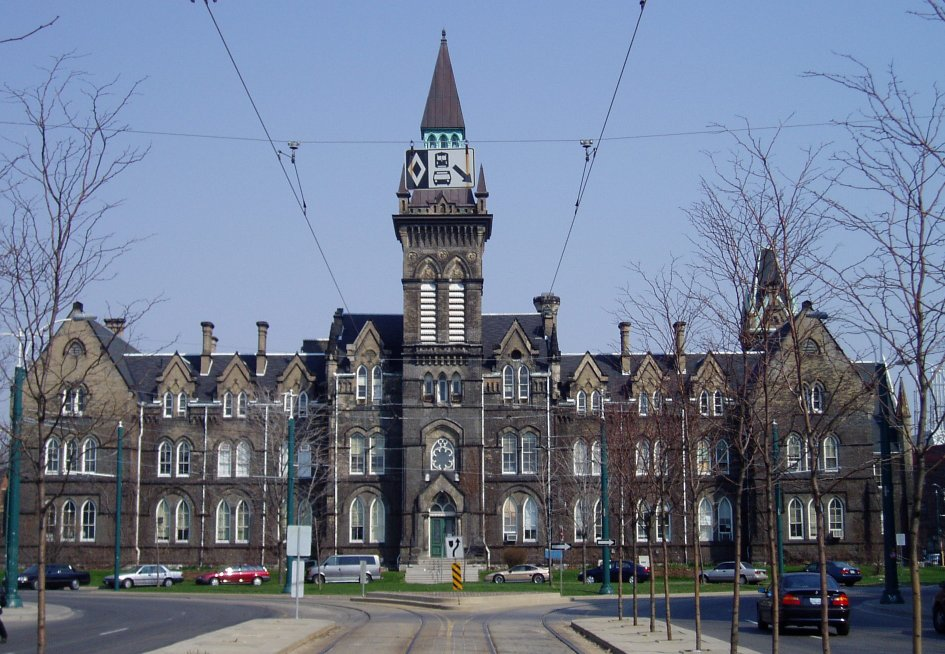
- View of the building's south façade in 2005
- Former names: Spadina Military Hospital (1916–1943)
- Alternative names: One Spadina Crescent

General information
- Architectural style: Gothic Revival
- Location: 1 Spadina Crescent, Toronto, Ontario, Canada
- Coordinates: 43°39′35″N 79°24′03″W
- Current tenants: John H. Daniels Faculty of Architecture, Landscape, and Design
- Named for: John H. Daniels
- Completed: 1875; 151 years ago
- Owner: University of Toronto

Design and construction
- Architect: James Avon Smith

Other information
- Public transit: at Spadina; 510 506

Ontario Heritage Act
- Criteria: Designated Part IV
- Designated: Mar 17, 1976

The Daniels Building is an academic building in Toronto that houses the John H. Daniels Faculty of Architecture, Landscape, and Design of the University of Toronto. Located on the St. George campus, the building is situated in the centre of a roundabout of Spadina Avenue, north of College Street. Its location provides a picturesque vista looking north up Spadina Avenue; it is an axial view terminus for the street.

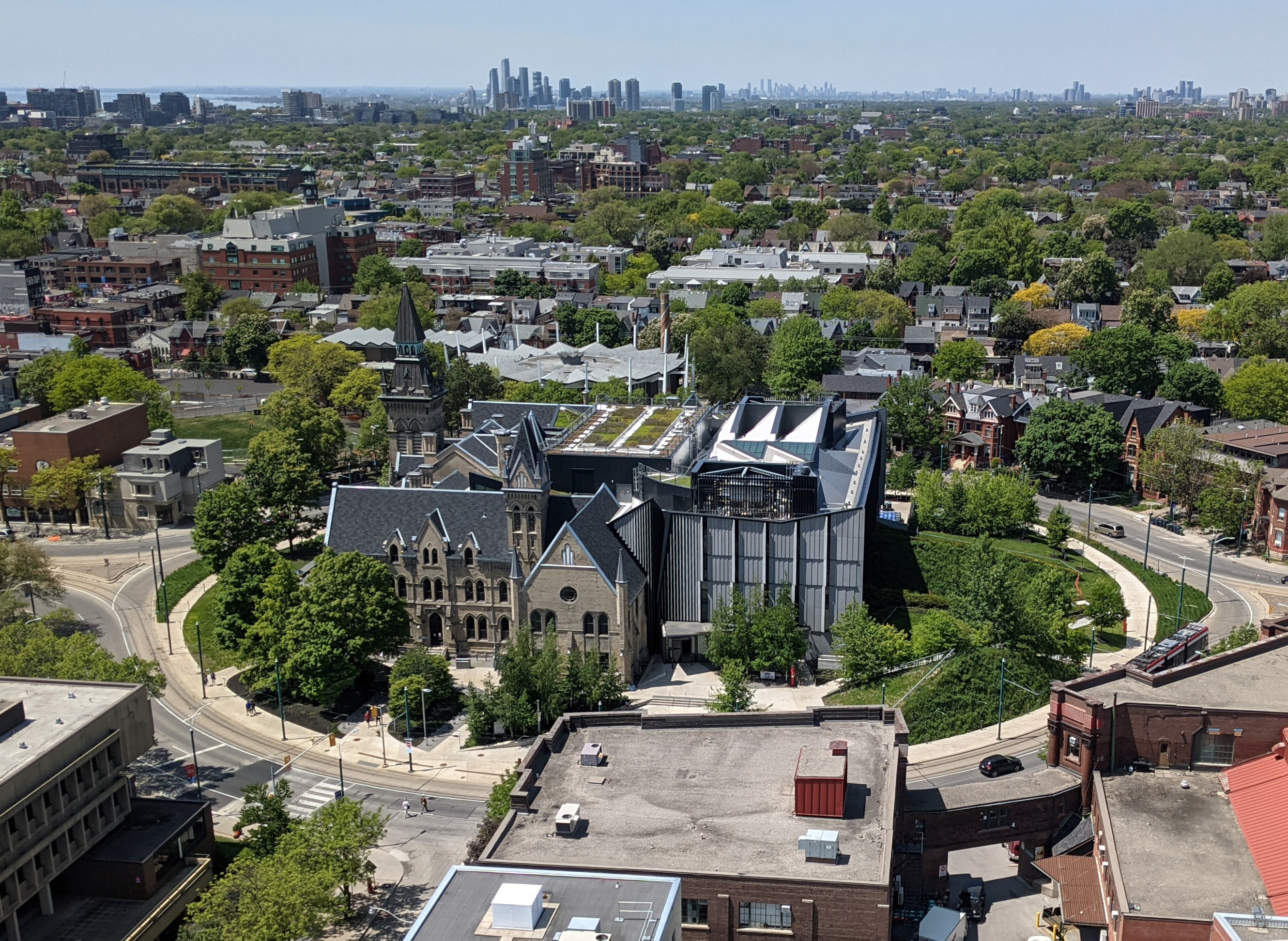
Aerial view showing the original southern portion to the left, and the discordant new north side

== History ==
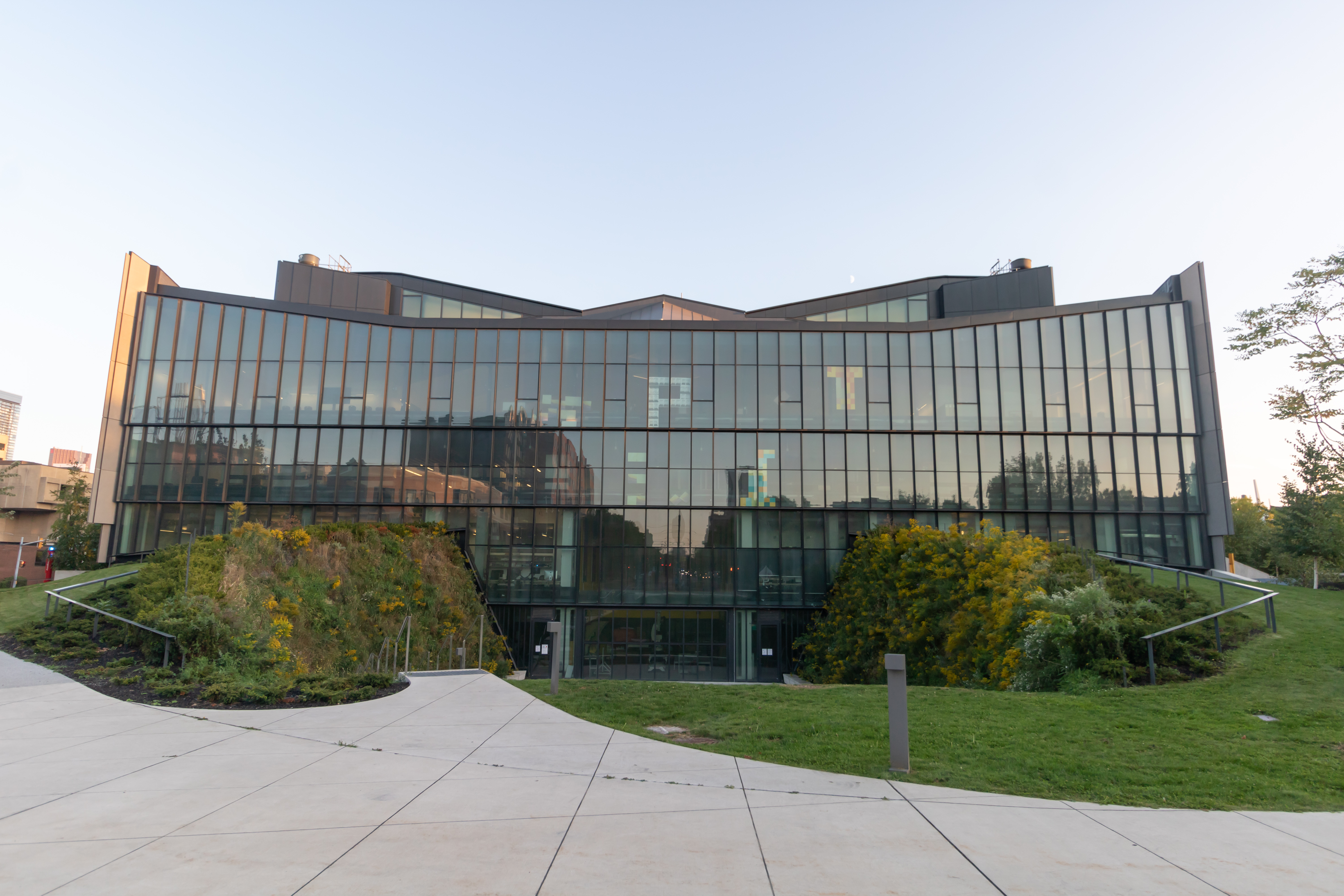
North side of the Daniels Building

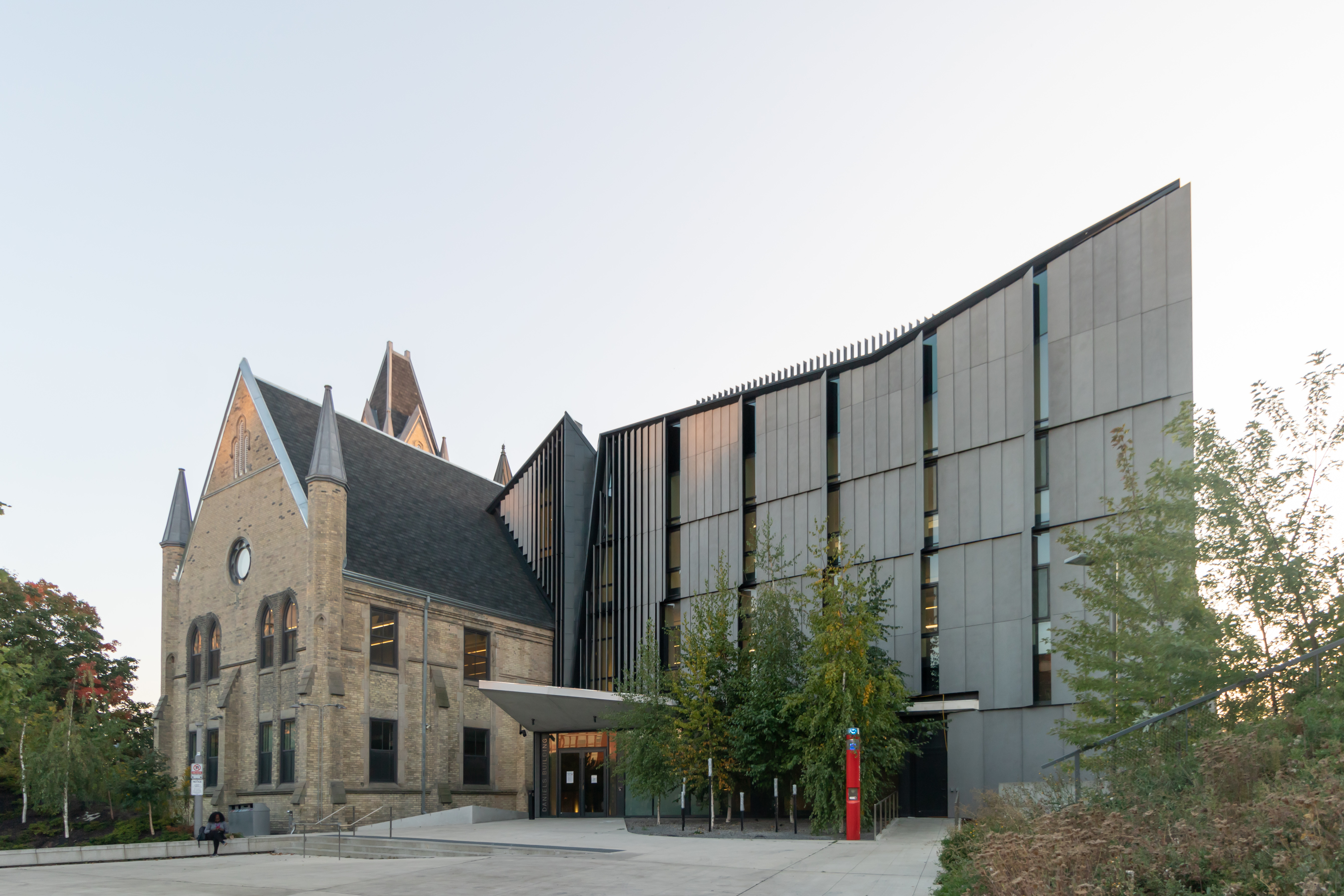
The east side of the Daniels Building shows both the new addition and the old building

The parcel of land now known as Spadina Crescent first appeared on maps of Toronto as early as 1835, originally named Mansfield's Old Gardens and then Crescent Garden. The property was originally laid out by Dr. William Baldwin to cut through his family's land holdings. There was an intention for the city to turn this property into a park after Dr. Baldwin's death, but the conditions for this were never met, and his grandchildren sold the land in 1873 to the Hon. J. McMurrich of the Presbyterian Church for $10,000.

A Gothic Revival building designed by architect James Avon Smith was built in 1875 as the home of Knox College, a theological college of the Presbyterian Church in Canada. Knox College became affiliated with the University of Toronto in 1887, and it moved to its current location on the west side of King's College Circle in 1914.

During World War I, the building became barracks, and shortly afterwards became the Spadina Military Hospital in October 1916. For a period in 1918, Amelia Earhart worked as a nurse's aide at the hospital. It remained a veterans' hospital until 1943, when it was acquired by the University of Toronto's Connaught Medical Research Laboratories, which became one of Canada's main centres for the development and manufacture of pharmaceuticals. The building was in disrepair at this point and needed substantial renovations. It was also around this time that the basement was excavated.

During the 1960s, it was proposed that this building be demolished to make way for the Spadina Expressway, which was never built. It became an academic building again in 1972 with the sale and relocation of the laboratories. The building was home to the Ontario division of the Eye Bank of Canada and to an alternative U of T student weekly newspaper, The Newspaper, which moved because of renovations.

In January 2001, University of Toronto professor David Buller was murdered in his office within the building, and the case remains unsolved.

In June 2013, U of T announced a significant overhaul and renovation of the building, with plans to make it the new home for the Daniels Faculty of Architecture. On December 4, 2015, the Toronto Star published a video by Christopher Hume, its architecture critic, celebrating the building's history and the university's plan to renovate, update and expand the building. The building was subsequently restored and renovated by a team of architects – including heritage architects ERA, as well as design architects Nader Tehrani and Katherine Faulkner of the Boston-based firm NADAAA. The expansion, which was completed in 2017, included a new contemporary glass, concrete and steel addition to the north side.

The expanded portion of the building now offers space for design studios, lounges, a student cafe, workshops and fabrication labs. The historic building was sensitively restored and renovated to accommodate the new library, classes and faculty offices. Toronto-based landscape architecture studio PUBLIC WORK designed the surrounding landscape, which includes native plants and trees such as birch and oak. On the north side are two large berms, a grassy area and a stepped pathway that leads to the fabrication laboratory. The extensive project received several awards for architectural excellence and was published in magazines around the world.

== Interiors ==
=== Main Hall ===
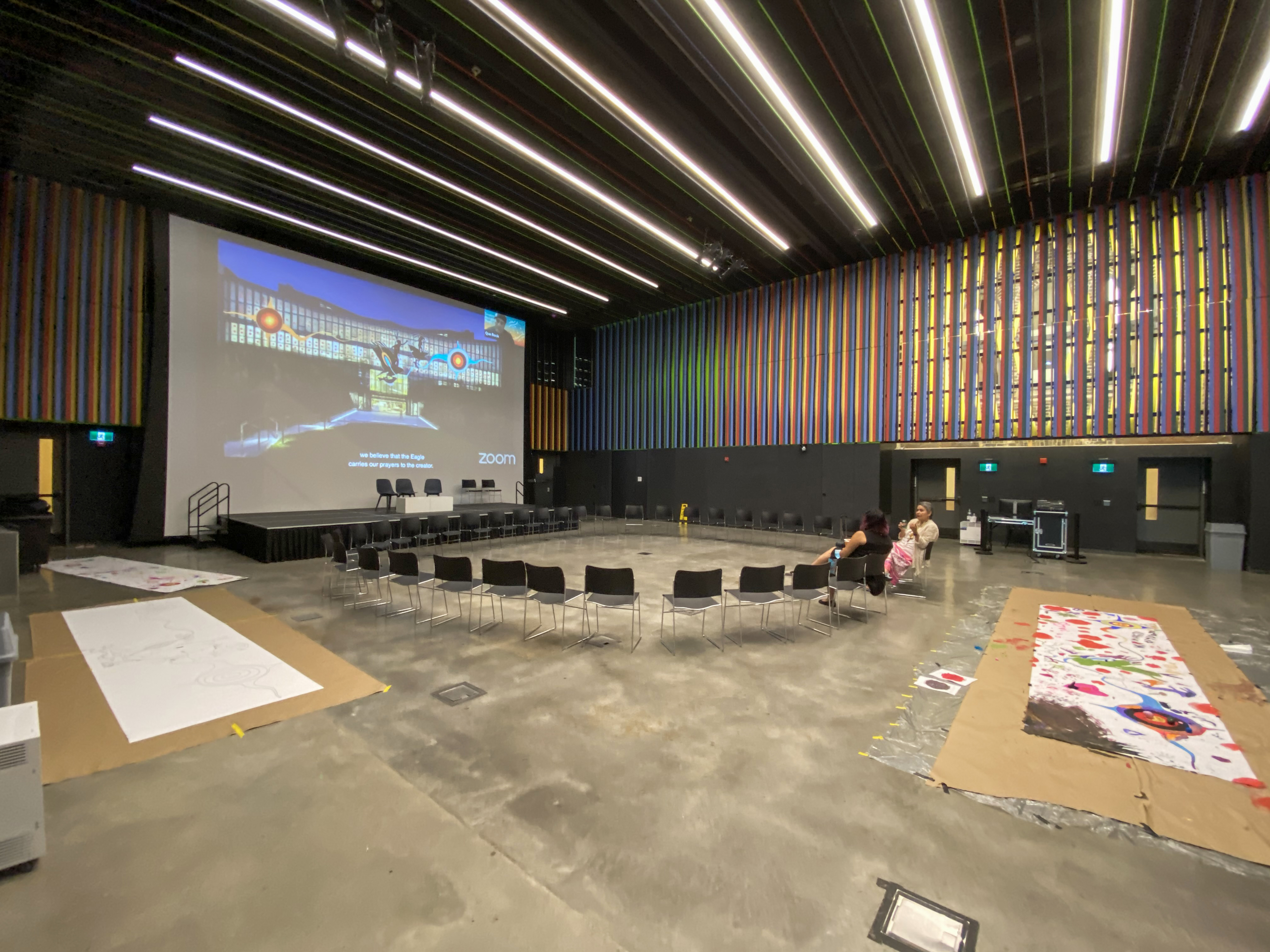
Main Hall

Formerly the site of the Knox College courtyard, The Main Hall is a double-height lecture hall with bleacher-style seating for lectures, performances, and events of up to 400 people. The hall is at the heart of building, accessible via both the historic part of the building at the south side, and via the new east-west internal "street"/corridor in the new building. In 2018, the hall hosted Pritzker Architecture Prize winner Balkrishna Doshi's public lecture about his work and the prize. The hall is adorned with colourful painted plywood walls that add a sense of energy and movement to the space. Above, "a triangular section of stepped seating, like an open stair outside the volume between the second and third floors, overlooks the hall and simultaneously connects to the design studio for graduate students at the top."

=== Graduate Design Studio ===
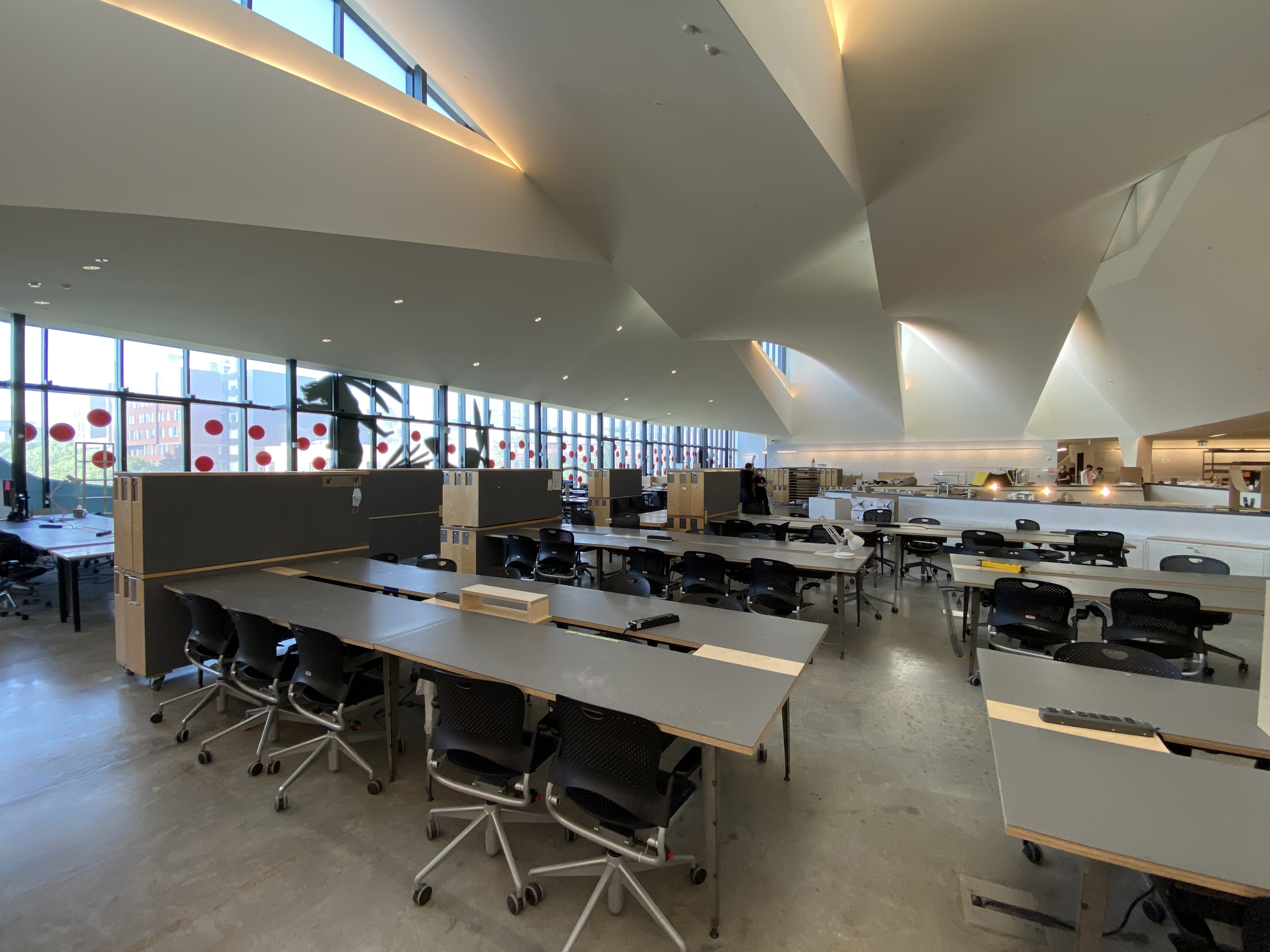
Graduate Design Studio

The third-floor graduate design studio is known for its expansive "column-free" space that extends across the entire North side of the building and offers views of the city through a glazed curtain wall. NADAAA architects used gypsum boards to design a dramatic "bow-tie" ceiling made of four scissor trusses and clerestory ceiling openings that bring in natural light. Architect Nader Tehrani was inspired by the Firth of Forth Bridge in Scotland.

=== Fabrication Lab ===
The fabrication lab is a double-height workshop and digital laboratory which "offers a variety of computationally controlled technologies, including large 3-axis and 4-axis routers, a fused deposition modelling rapid-prototyping system, a waterjet cutter, a colour 3D printer, a 3D digitizer, a 3D laser scanner, several laser cutters, and a large format vacuum former." The array of digital tools allow students at the faculty to produce models and various structural elements in wood and metals. The lab is viewable to students and visitors at the building from the east-west "street" that runs through the centre of the building. Double-height garage style doors open to a landscaped courtyard. Adjacent to the lab is the Daniels construction workshop which includes a full metal and woodworking shop, an assembly space, spray booth, and a large array of materials and tools.

=== Eberhard Zeidler Library ===
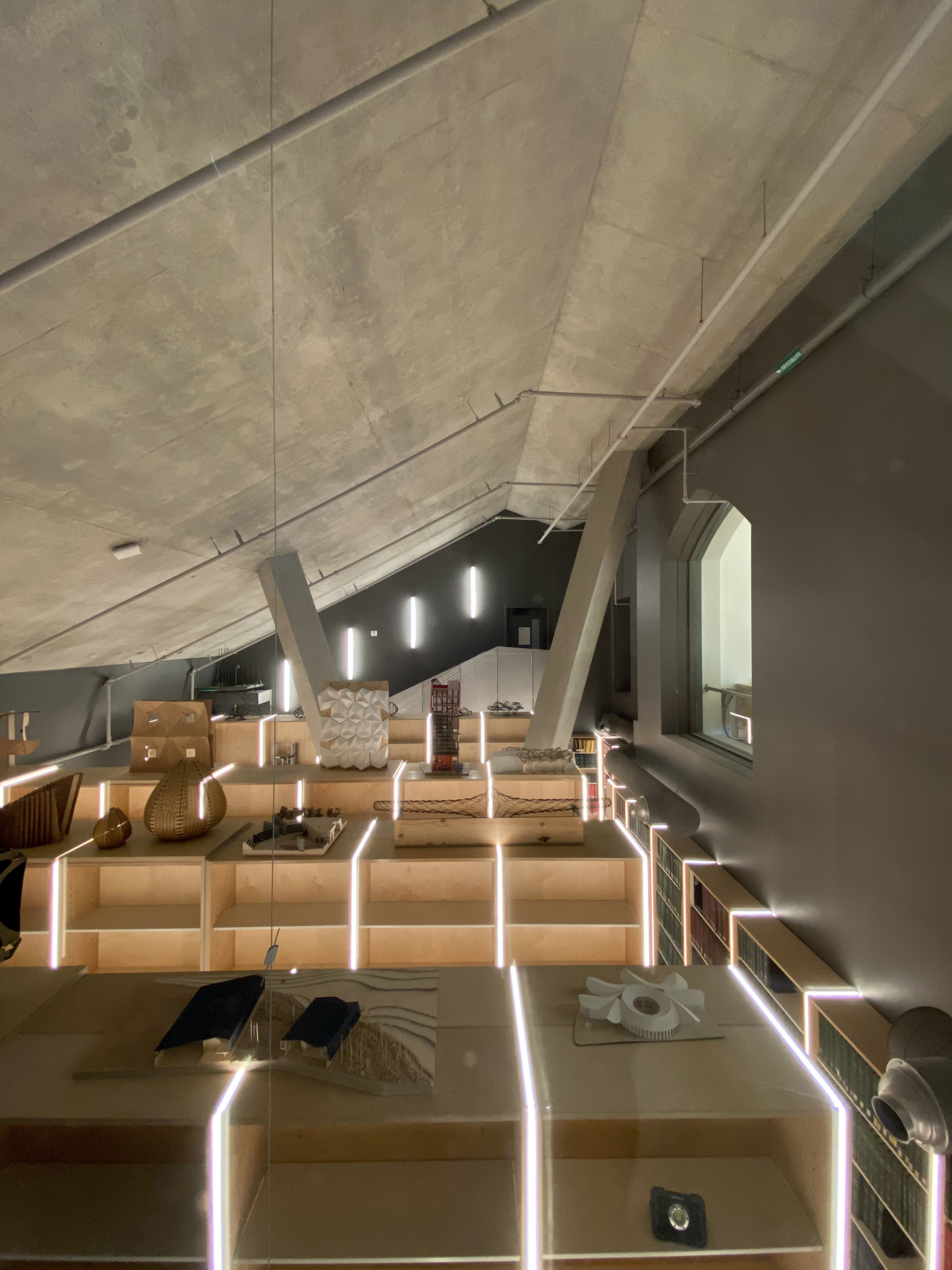
Eberhard Zeidler Library

The Eberhard Zeidler Library is located in the historic part of the building, on the west side of the first floor. The library is named after architect and Zeidler Partnership founder Eberhard Zeidler. The library offers an extensive collection of books on architecture, landscape architecture, art, and urban design.

=== Architecture and Design Gallery ===
The Architecture and Design Gallery is an experimental public gallery dedicated to showcasing and advocating for the important ways that design shapes our cities, landscapes, and daily lives. Located in the lower level of the building, it was renovated from a "concrete shell" into a 7,500 s.f. exhibition venue after the new building opened in 2017. The space launched on November 9, 2019, with the opening of the inaugural installation New Circadia. The gallery is supported by the Estate of James Drewry Stewart and the Government of Canada.

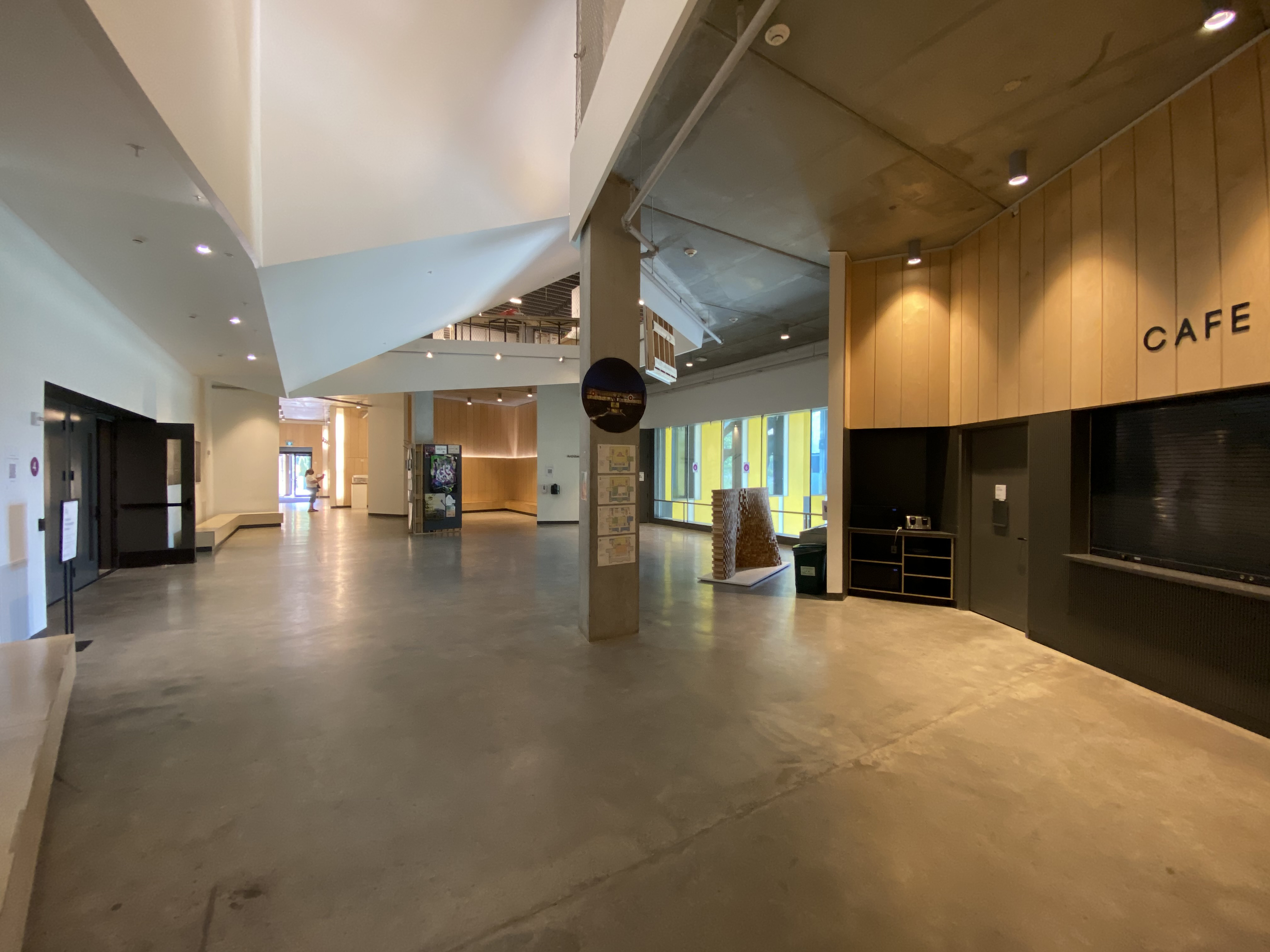
Level 1 The Student Commons

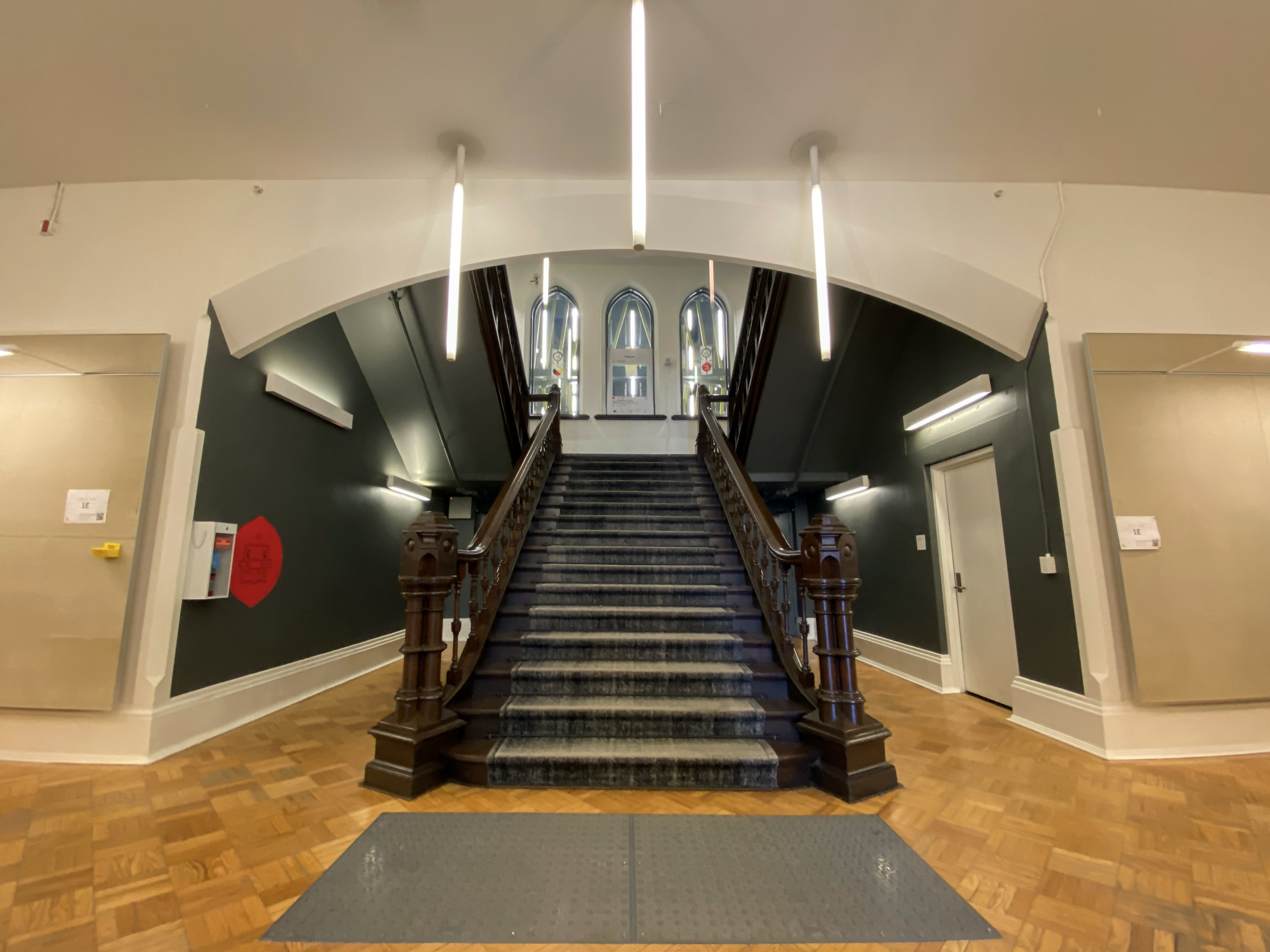
Building stair

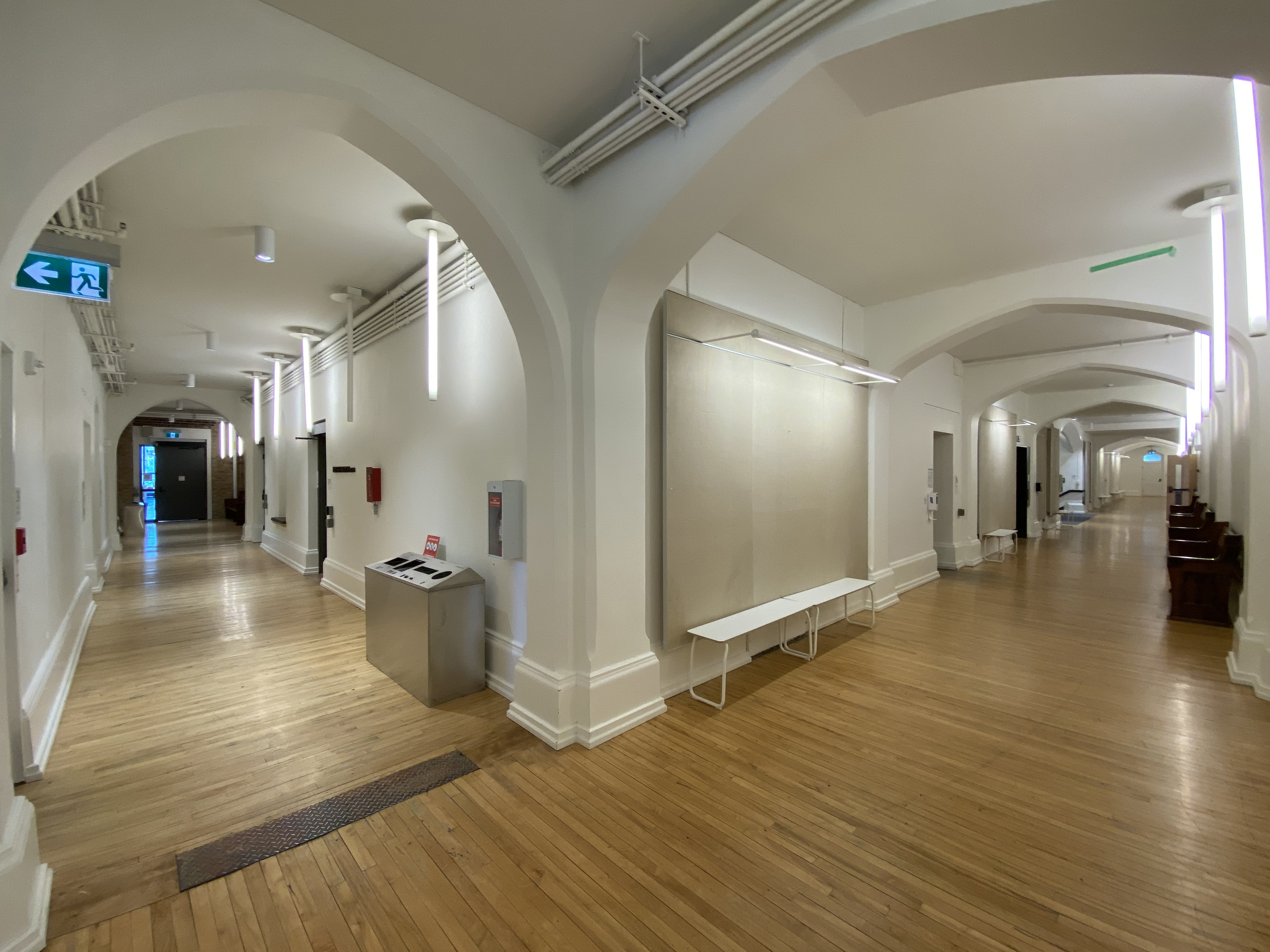
Level 2 corridor

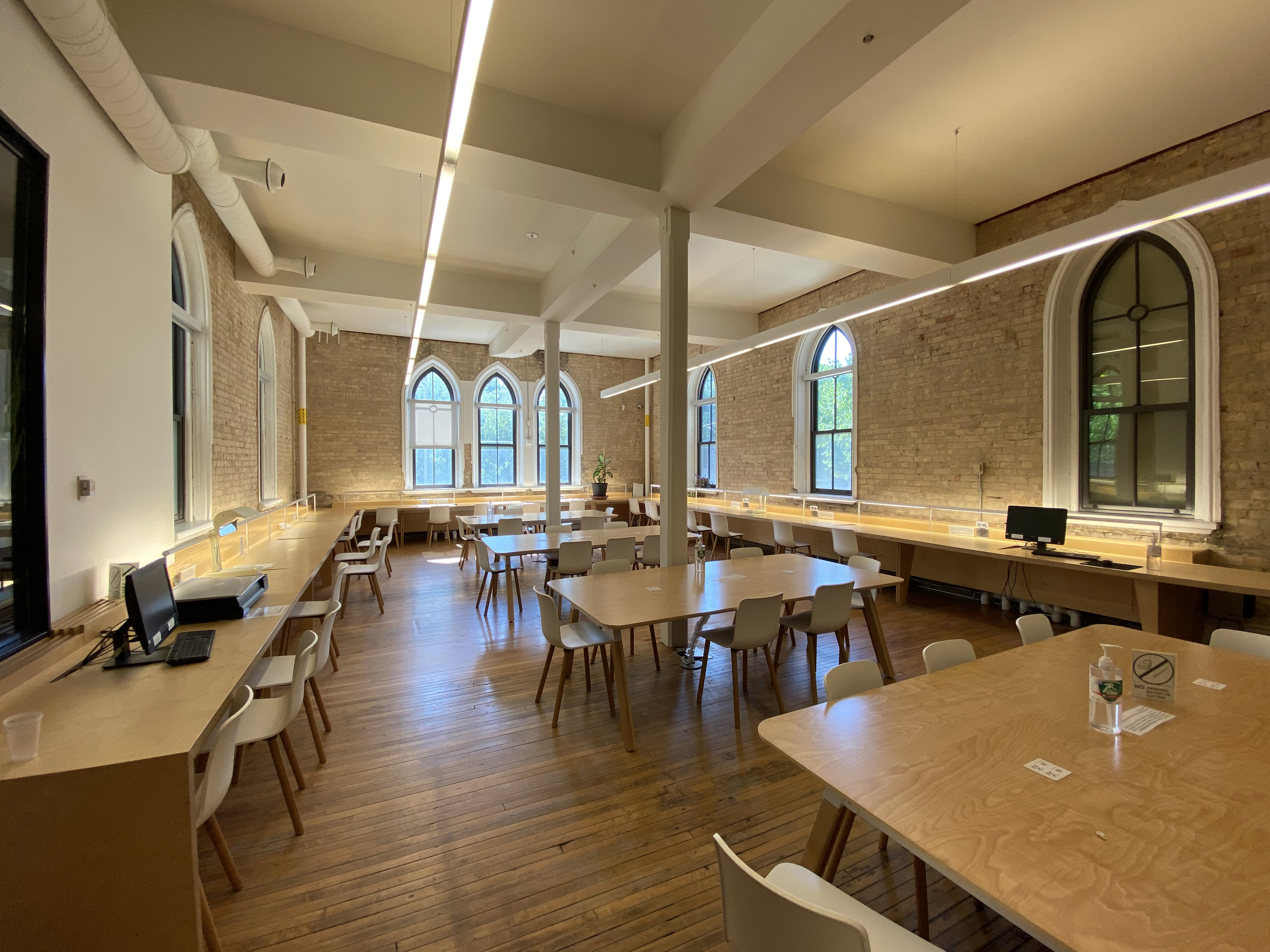
Eberhard Zeidler Library interior

== Awards ==
Architecture Masterprize Education Award, 2019

Architecture Masterprize Green Award, 2019

Architectural Conservancy Ontario, Paul Oberman Award for Adaptive Re-use, 2019

Toronto Urban Design Awards, Award of Excellence, 2019

Heritage Toronto Awards, William Greer Built Heritage Award, 2019

SCUP/AIA-CAE Excellence in Architecture for Building Additions or Adaptive Reuse Honor Award, 2019

COTE Top 10, American Institute of Architects, 2019

AIA Education Facilities National Award of Excellence, 2019

Canadian Society of Landscape Architects National Award, 2019

Lt. Governor's Ontario Heritage Award of Excellence in Conservation, 2018

American Architecture Award, Chicago Athenaeum, 2018

Illinois Institute of Technology College of Architecture, Mies Crown Hall Americas Prize Outstanding Project, 2018

Fast Company Spaces, Places, and Cities Finalist, 2018

Boston Society of Architects Honor Award, 2018

Architect's Newspaper Best of Design Awards Winner in Educational Category and Honorable Mention for Building of the Year, 2018

AIA New York, Architecture Honor Award, 2018

Interior Design Best of Year Award, 2017

The Plan Awards, Honorable Mention, 2017

Canadian Institute of Steel Construction Awards, Award of Excellence, 2017

Society of American Registered Architects National Architecture Award, 2015

Chicago Athenaeum: Museum of Architecture & Design: Green Good Design Award, 2014

Holcim Foundation - Sustainability in Architecture Acknowledgment Prize, 2014

Boston Society of Architects: Unbuilt Architecture Award, 2013

57th Progressive Architecture Awards: Award, Architecture (previous site), 2010

== See also ==
- List of University of Toronto buildings
