= John H. Daniels Faculty of Architecture, Landscape, and Design =

Design school of the University of Toronto

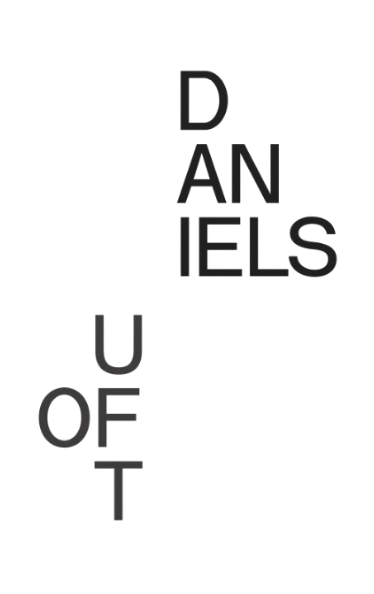
- Logo for the faculty designed by Bruce Mau
- Former names: Department of Architecture (1890–1998); Faculty of Architecture, Landscape, and Design (1998–2008)
- Type: Public
- Established: 1890; 136 years ago
- Parent institution: University of Toronto
- Dean: Mason White
- Location: Daniels Building; 1 Spadina Crescent, Toronto, Ontario, Canada; 43°39′34″N 79°24′03″W
- Named for: John and Myrna Daniels
- Website: daniels.utoronto.ca

The John H. Daniels Faculty of Architecture, Landscape, and Design (commonly shortened to Daniels) is an academic division of the University of Toronto (U of T) based on its St. George campus that focuses on architecture, forestry, urban design, and art. Founded in 1890, the faculty was the first school in Canada to offer an architecture program, and one of the first to offer a landscape architecture program in 1965. Originally established as the Department of Architecture, the faculty changed its name in 2008 to its present name in honour of benefactors John and Myrna Daniels.

The faculty offers undergraduate degrees, as well as advanced degrees at the master's and doctoral levels. It offers graduate programs on both the St. George and Scarborough campuses through the School of Graduate Studies. As of September 2023, the faculty is overseen by acting dean Robert Levit, with various directors for each of the faculty's programs at the bachelor's, master's, and Ph.D. levels, respectively.

== History ==
Headed by the engineer C.H.C. Wright, the Department of Architecture was established at the University of Toronto in 1890, making it the first architecture program in Canada and one of the earliest in North America. The department started as an affiliation with the School of Practical Sciences, and offered a Bachelor of Applied Sciences. In 1922, the undergraduate degree was changed to the Bachelor of Architecture and a Master of Architecture degree was initiated, allowing architectural instruction at the university to achieve its own identity. By 1931, an official School of Architecture was established, and courses in Landscape Architecture and Town and Regional Planning were included in the roster. After serving for 44 years, C.H.C. Wright handed over administration of the School to Colonel H.H. Madill in 1934.

Limited first-year enrolment was introduced to the School in 1959 after an increase in applications to the School's programs following the return of citizens after World War II. Dr. Thomas Howarth was appointed as Director in 1958, opening up the School's course offerings to include a two-year Master of Science degree in Urban and Regional Planning in 1963, and a Division of Landscape Architecture was established in 1965 that introduced a new Bachelor of Landscape Architecture degree.

In 1961, the School of Architecture, Landscape Architecture, and Urban and Regional Planning moved to its current location at 230 College Street. This facility was equipped with various amenities including a library, construction laboratory, workshop, photography darkrooms, exhibition spaces, lecture and seminar rooms, and well-lit studio areas. The School obtained faculty status in 1967, with its departments being Architecture, Landscape Architecture, and Urban and Regional Planning.

John Andrews assumed the role of chair of the Department of Architecture in 1967 and later invited Peter Prangnell to contribute to changes in the undergraduate program. In 1968, Andrews stepped down from his position, with Prangnell taking on the role of acting chair and later chair from 1969 to 1976. At the end of Thomas Howarth's term as Dean in 1977, the university broke up the faculty, incorporating the former Landscape Department into the Forestry Faculty, and transforming the former Architecture Department into a separate School of Architecture.

The School of Architecture regained its status as a faculty in 1980 under the leadership of dean Blanche Lemco van Ginkel. During this period, George Baird became acting chair following the resignation of Antonio de Souza Santos, and the faculty encountered challenges in the following decade, facing the threat of closure by the provost. However, a collective effort by faculty members, professionals, the local community, and the broader architectural academic community led to the preservation of architectural studies at the University of Toronto. Within this renewed structure, Anthony Eardley took on the role of dean, sharing program chair responsibilities with Steven Fong. This arrangement persisted until 1997, when Larry Wayne Richards assumed the position of both dean and chair of the architecture program.

Richards created a divisional plan for the faculty, which was approved by the university's academic board, that implemented five new academic programs: an undergraduate Major in Architectural Studies, jointly with the Faculty of Arts and Science; a trio of Master's programs in Architecture, Landscape Architecture, and Urban Design; and a small Ph.D. program in Architecture. Following the approval of this plan in 1998, the Faculty officially changed its name to the "Faculty of Architecture, Landscape, and Design" to showcase its new diversity of academic offerings. Ten years later, John and Myrna Daniels made a historic gift of $14 million to the faculty, establishing an endowment for financial aid to students and launching the expansion and renovation of the faculty's building. In recognition of the gift, the faculty's name was changed to the "John H. Daniels Faculty of Architecture, Landscape, and Design". Shortly after, in 2009, Richard M. Sommer succeeded George Baird as dean of the faculty.

Following an additional donation by John and Myrna Daniels in 2013, the new "Daniels Faculty" revealed its plans to shift focus from 230 College Street to rehabilitate the building at 1 Spadina Crescent and incorporate a large, contemporary extension on the northern half of the site. Through a design competition, Nader Tehrani, principal of the internationally acclaimed architecture firm NADAAA, and collaborator Katie Faulkner were chosen to lead the design. Toronto consultants Public Work were chosen as the landscape designers, ERA Architects as the preservation architects, and Adamson Associates as the executive architects.

The building was opened as the Daniels Building in 2017 at 1 Spadina Crescent, in the centre of the roundabout on the major thoroughfare of Spadina Avenue on the western edge of the university's St. George campus. The One Spadina project was led by former dean Richard M. Sommer, and was designed by American architect Nader Tehrani with his Boston-based firm NADAAA in conjunction with Adamson Associates Architects as architect of record, and Public Work as the primary landscape architects. Since its completion, the project received over 25 design and planning awards for both design and sustainability in landscape and facilities.

== Degree programs ==
The degrees granted at the graduate level include:

- Master of Architecture (MArch) (Professional)
- Master or Architecture (MArch) (Post-Professional)
- Master of Urban Design (MUD)
- Master of Landscape Architecture (MLA)
- Master of Visual Studies (MVS):
  - Studio Art
  - Curatorial Studies

In addition to the graduate programs, the Daniels faculty offers a collaborative program in Knowledge Media Design through the University of Toronto's Knowledge Media Design Institute to all masters’ students in the MArch, MLA, and MUD programs. Master of Visual Studies candidates are eligible for a collaborative graduate program in Sexual Diversity Studies.

On July 7, 2016, the Daniels Faculty announced a new curriculum for the undergraduate degrees, beginning in the 2016–2017 school year. This new selection of degrees include:

- Honours Bachelor of Arts with a Specialist in Architectural Studies:
  - Comprehensive
  - Design of Architecture, Landscape, and Urbanism
  - History and Theory of Architecture, Landscape, and Urbanism
  - Technology of Architecture, Landscape, and Urbanism
- Honours Bachelor of Arts with a Specialist in Visual Studies:
  - Studio
  - Critical Practices
- Honours Bachelor of Arts with a Major in Visual Studies

== Public Lecture Series ==
Each year, Daniels presents numerous public lectures, fora, and symposia that showcase renowned designers and leaders in the fields of architecture, landscape, urban design, visual studies, as well as important thinkers and opinion makers in allied fields from across the world. The public lectures cover the wide range of approaches taken by professionals and academics who are asking important questions about and tackling the significant challenges facing cities and landscapes.

=== Notable lecturers ===
- Alan Berger
- Charles Blow
- Will Bruder
- Josemaria de Churtichaga
- Preston Scott Cohen
- James Corner
- Merrill Elam
- Kenneth Frampton
- Sou Fujimoto
- Frank Gehry
- Adriaan Geuze
- Christophe Girot
- Kathryn Gustafson
- Mitchell Joachim
- Wes Jones
- Phyllis Lambert
- Diane Lewis
- Daniel Libeskind
- Jürgen H. Mayer
- Beth Meyer
- William Morrish
- Hrvoje Njiric
- Cornelia Hahn Oberlander
- Dirk Sijmons
- Alvaro Siza
- Nader Tehrani
- Michael van Valkenburgh
- Kongjian Yu

== Research and publications ==
=== Model Cities Theatre and Lab ===
Located in the Daniels Building.

=== Institute for Architecture and Human Health ===
The new Institute for Architecture and Human Health will anchor a new Masters program in Health Design. It is intended to educate professionals on how to address health care and wellness through innovations in architecture, landscape, and urban design. The Institute for Architecture and Human Health will be established once the Daniels Building opens to the public in the fall of 2016.

=== Global Cities Institute ===
Originally established with funding from the World Bank, the CGIF is developing standardized metrics for the global comparison of cities. The GCIF's database comprises 115 indicators across a standardized set of definitions and methodologies, which enable cities to track their effectiveness on everything from planning and economic growth to transportation, safety and education. The Global Cities Institute is currently located at 170 Bloor Street West, but will be incorporated into the Daniels Building.

=== One Spadina Green Roof Innovation Testing Lab ===
Established in 2010, the Green Roof Innovation Testing Laboratory (GRIT Lab) is a facility for testing the environmental performance of green roofs, green walls, and solar photovoltaic technologies in the Canadian context. The GRIT Lab consists of 33 green roof test beds, three green walls, a weather station, and 270 sensors connected to over 5,000 linear feet of wiring. Data on soil moisture, runoff, temperature, rainfall, humidity, solar energy, and wind is collected every five minutes. The lab sits currently sits atop of the Daniels Faculty building at 230 College Street, but will later continue its work from a more prominent space atop the landscape pavilions of the Daniels Building.

=== The Annual ===
The Annual, a publication funded and managed by the Graduate Architecture Landscape and Design Student Union (GALDSU), is a curated compilation of student work. Each academic year, graduate students are invited to apply for the editorial roles of The Annual and are chosen by a GALDSU-appointed selection committee. Following the appointment of editors, an open call is issued to students from all graduate programs at the John H. Daniels Faculty of Architecture, Landscape, and Design to submit their work for consideration. Recent editors include Amanda Chong and Christine Kim (2012-2013), Jasmeen Bains and Clarence Lacy (2013-2014), Megan Esopenko and Emilia Hurd (2014-2015), Jasper Flores and Elise Hunchuck and Dayne Roy-Caldwell (2015-2016), Matthew De Santis and Liusadh Macdonald and Naomi Shevchuk (2016-2017).

The publication was funded solely by GALDSU until the 2016-2017 issue, when in a break with longstanding tradition, the publication was sponsored by third parties including local architects and professional governing bodies.

=== Place-holder ===
Place-holder (stylized in all caps) is an independent graduate student-run journal. It is an active catalogue of design, for contemporary use and future reference, and a repository of ideas. Founded by Elizabeth Krasner and Roya Mottahedeh in 2012, it ran until at least 2016 when it received a grant under editors Michael Abel and Mina Hanna. The advisory board includes Hans Ibelings, Anita Matusevics, Shawn Micallef, Elizabeth Krasner, and Roya Mottahedeh.

=== Shift Magazine ===
Shift Magazine is the online blog and the annual undergraduate publication for the Daniels Faculty of Architecture, Landscape, and Design that showcases student work and the lifestyle of the Architecture and Visual Studies undergraduates. SHIFT10: "Backyard Trips" was published on September 12, 2022.

== Clubs and activities ==
=== GALDSU ===
The Graduate Architecture Landscape and Design Student Union (GALDSU) is the students' union for all graduate programs at the John H. Daniels Faculty of Architecture, Landscape, and Design. GALDSU serves as the liaison with the faculty, administration, other student groups, and professional organizations such as the OALA and OAA.

GALDSU is run by a democratically elected Executive Council composed of the president, vice-president, treasurer, social events chair, health & sustainability officer, and secretary. The Executive Council is responsible for the day-to-day operations of the union. A six-member executive council is elected each year. Two students represent each class by attending monthly GALDSU meetings with the executive council.

=== AVSSU ===
Established in 2014, the Architecture and Visual Studies Student Union (AVSSU) is the official students' union for undergraduate students at the Daniels Faculty of Architecture, Landscape, and Design.

=== Café 059 ===
Café 059 is a student café, currently located at the Daniels Building, that is under the operation of students from the Daniels Faculty. It moved buildings, but the original location was in the basement, Room 059 of the Infirmary (hence the name that still exists today), and originally launched by Enzo Bertucci, Anthony Provenzano and friends in the 1990s.

== Distinguished alumni and faculty ==
=== Alumni ===
- Raymond Moriyama
- Shirley Blumberg
- Jimenez Lai
- Claude Cormier
- Bruce Kuwabara
- David Pontarini
- Craig Leonard
- George Baird
- Henry Sears
- Ralph Giannone

=== Faculty ===
- Charles Stankievech
- Ed Pien
- An Te Liu
- Lisa Steele
- Brigitte Shim
- George Baird BArch (Toronto), AM (Hon)(Harvard)
- Carmen Corneil BArch (Toronto)
- Anthony Eardley AA Dipl (Hons), MA (Cantab)
- Ants Elken Dipl Ing Arch (Munich)
- George Hawken BA (Honours) 1969 (Toronto)
- Douglas H. Lee BArch (McGill), MSc (Illinois), MBA (York)
- Blanche Lemco van Ginkel, C.M., BArch (McGill), M.C.P. (Harvard), Hon Doc (Aix -Marseille)
- Peter Prangnell AA Dipl, MArch (Harvard)
- Larry Wayne Richards BArch (Miami, Oxford, OH), MArch (Yale)
- Paul Sandori Dipl Ing Arch (Zagreb)
- Klaus Dunker Dipl Ing Arch (Hannover)
- Gerald Englar
- Edward Fife BLA (RISD), MLA (Harvard)
- John Andrews

== See also ==
- List of architecture schools
