= Peter Joseph Hundt =

Canadian Roman Catholic prelate

- Archbishop of St. John's, Newfoundland
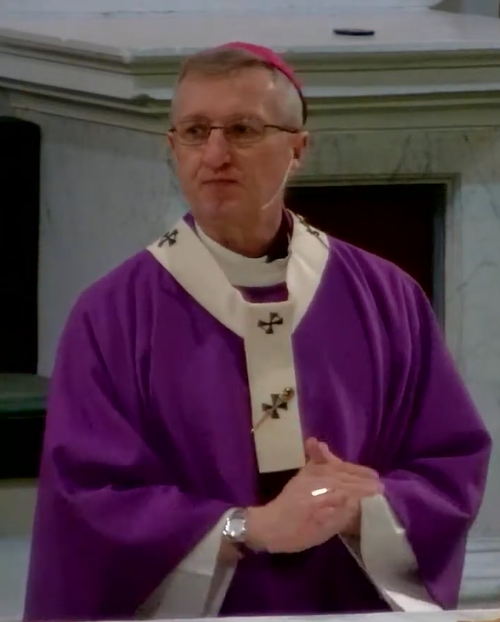
- Hundt in 2022
- Church: Catholic Church
- Archdiocese: St. John's, Newfoundland
- Appointed: December 12, 2018
- Installed: January 29, 2019
- Predecessor: Martin William Currie
- Previous posts: Auxiliary Bishop of Toronto (2006–2011); Titular Bishop of Tarasa in Byzacena (2006–2011); Bishop of Roman Corner Brook and Labrador (2011–2018)

Orders
- Ordination: May 8, 1982 by Paul Francis Reding
- Consecration: April 25, 2006 by Aloysius Ambrozic

Personal details
- Born: August 26, 1956 (age 70) Hanover, Ontario, Canada
- Coat of arms: Peter Joseph Hundt's coat of arms

Ordination history
History
Priestly ordination
- Ordained by: Paul Francis Reding
Episcopal consecration
- Principal consecrator: Aloysius Matthew Ambrozic
- Co-consecrators: Anthony Frederick Tonnos, Matthew Francis Ustrzycki
Episcopal succession
Bishops consecrated by Peter Joseph Hundt as principal consecrator
- Bartholomeus van Roijen: December 12, 2019

Peter Joseph Hundt (born August 26, 1956) is a Canadian Roman Catholic prelate and has been the archbishop of the Archdiocese of St. John's, Newfoundland since 2019. He was an auxiliary bishop of Toronto (2006–2011) and Bishop of Corner Brook and Labrador (2011–2018).

== Biography ==
Hundt was born in Hanover, Ontario. He attended St. Francis Xavier School in Carlsruhe, Ontario; Holy Family School in Hanover; and high school at Sacred Heart Catholic High School in Walkerton, Ontario.

He earned a Bachelor of Arts degree from St. Jerome's College, in Waterloo, Ontario, Ontario and Masters of Divinity at St. Peter's Seminary in London, Ontario. He was ordained as a Catholic priest for the Diocese of Hamilton on May 8, 1982 and served as an associate pastor at St. Eugene's Parish in Hamilton, Ontario from 1982-1985. From 1985-1987, he studied at the Pontifical University of Saint Thomas Aquinas in Rome, Italy and was awarded with a Licenciate in Canon law. Upon his return to Canada, he served as vice-chancellor of the Hamilton Diocese from 1987-1990 and then chancellor from 1990 to his appointment in 1994 as pastor of Holy Cross Parish in Georgetown, Ontario.

On February 11, 2006, Pope Benedict XVI appointed him Titular Bishop of Tarasa in Byzacena and auxiliary bishop of the Archdiocese of Toronto, Ontario. He was ordained a bishop on April 25, at the Cathedral Basilica of Christ the King in Hamilton with Cardinal Aloysius Ambrozic, Archbishop of Toronto, as the principal consecrator and assisted by Anthony F. Tonnos, Bishop of Hamilton, and by Matthew Francis Ustrzycki Titular Bishop of Nationa and auxiliary bishop of Hamilton. As an auxiliary bishop, he was responable for the Northern Region of the archdiocese.

On March 1, 2011, Pope Benedict XVI appointed him the Bishop of Corner Brook and Labrador. He was installed on April 13, 2011.

On December 12, 2018 he was appointed Archbishop of St. John's, Newfoundland, Canada by Pope Francis. He was installed on January 20, 2019.

Catholic Church titles
Preceded by Martin William Currie	Archbishop of St. John's; 2018–present	Succeeded by Incumbent
