= Gerard Paul Bergie =

Canadian Catholic bishop

The Most Reverend Gerard Paul Bergie
- Bishop of Saint Catharines
- Church: Catholic Church
- Diocese: Saint Catharines
- Appointed: September 14, 2010
- Installed: November 9, 2010
- Predecessor: James Matthew Wingle
- Previous posts: Auxilary Bishop of Hamilton (2005–2010); Titular Bishop of Tabae (2005–2010)

Orders
- Ordination: May 12, 1984
- Consecration: August 24, 2005 by Anthony F. Tonnos

Personal details
- Born: January 4, 1959 (age 67) Hamilton, Ontario, Canada
- Education: St. Jerome's University; St. Peter's Seminary; University of Western Ontario (MDiv); Pontifical University of Saint Thomas Aquinas (JCL)

Gerard Paul Bergie (born January 4, 1959) is a Canadian Roman Catholic prelate who has been the bishop of the Roman Catholic Diocese of Saint Catharines since 2010.

== Biography ==
Hundt was born in Hamilton, Ontario. He studied at St. Jerome's College, in Waterloo, Ontario, St. Peter's Seminary, and the University of Western Ontario both in London, Ontario. He was ordained as a Catholic priest for the Diocese of Hamilton on May 12, 1984. From 1984-1989, he served as an associate pastor at Our Lady of Lourdes Parish in Hamilton and St. Francis Xaiver Parish in Stoney Creek, Ontario. From 1989-1991, he studied at the Pontifical University of Saint Thomas Aquinas in Rome, Italy and was awarded with a Licenciate in Canon law. Upon his return to Canada, he served again as an assistant at Our Lady of Lourdes Parish in Hamilton along with serving as a judge on the Hamilton Diocese Marriage Tribunal. He served as chancellor of the Hamilton Diocese from 1993 to his appointment in 2000 as pastor of St. Margret Mary Parish in Hamilton.

On July 11, 2005, Pope Benedict XVI appointed him Titular Bishop of Tabae and auxiliary bishop of the Diocese of Hamilton, Ontario. He was ordained a bishop on April 25, at the Cathedral Basilica of Christ the King in Hamilton with Bishop Anthony F. Tonnos, Bishop of Hamilton, as the principal consecrator and assisted by Matthew Francis Ustrzycki Titular Bishop of Nationa and auxiliary bishop of Hamilton, and by Bishop John Michael Sherlock, Bishop of London, Ontario.

On September 14, 2010, Pope Benedict XVI appointed him the Bishop of Saint Catharines. He was installed on November 9, 2010.
