= Wayne Lobsinger =

Canadian prelate

His Excellency, The Most Reverend Wayne Lawrence Lobsinger
- Bishop of Peterborough
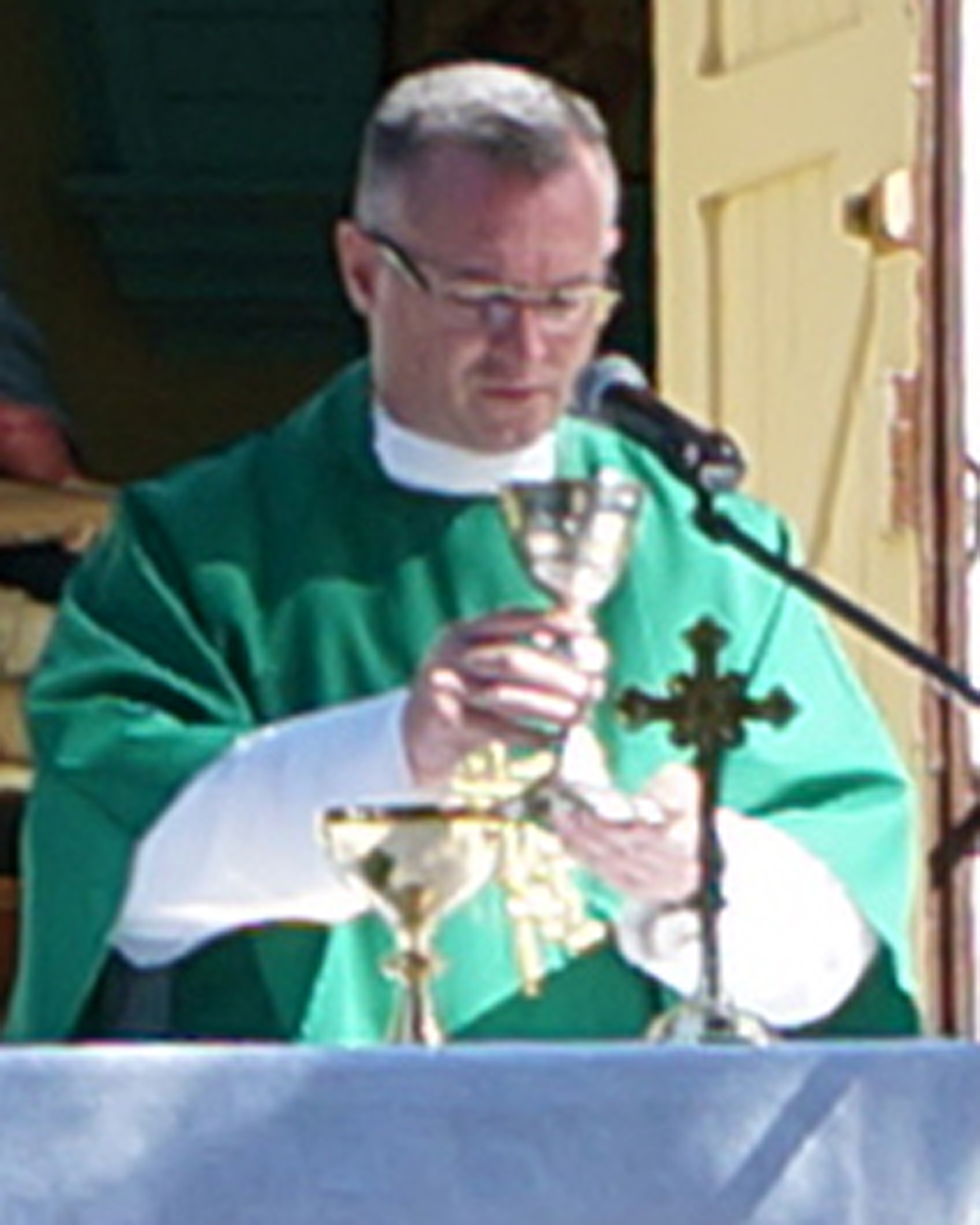
- Diocese: Hamilton
- Appointed: November 21, 2020
- Installed: April 18, 2021
- Other post: Titular Bishop of Gemellae in Numidia

Orders
- Ordination: May 7, 1994 by Anthony F. Tonnos
- Consecration: April 18, 2021 by Douglas Crosby, Anthony F. Tonnos, and Matthew Ustrzycki

Personal details
- Born: Wayne Lawrence Lobsinger; December 1, 1966 (age 59) Kitchener, Ontario, Canada
- Motto: Illum oportet crescere (He must become greater; I must become less)

Styles of Wayne Lawrence Lobsinger
- Reference style: His Excellency; The Most Reverend
- Spoken style: Your Excellency
- Religious style: Bishop

Wayne Lawrence Lobsinger (born December 1, 1966) is a Canadian prelate of the Roman Catholic Church who has been serving as auxiliary bishop for the Diocese of Hamilton since 2021. On November 13, 2026, His Holiness, Pope Leo XIV appointed His Excellency, Bishop Lobsinger as Bishop for the Diocese of Peterborough from the Diocese of Hamilton.

== Biography ==
=== Early life ===
His Excellency, Bishop Lobsinger was born on December 1, 1966, in Kitchener, Ontario, Canada. Following studies at the then-St. Jerome’s College (an affiliate of the University of Waterloo (BA 1989), in Waterloo, Ontario, and at St. Peter’s Seminary in London, Ontario, on May 7, 1994 he was ordained to the priesthood for the Diocese of Hamilton, Ontario.

== Priesthood ==
His Excellency, Bishop Lobsinger was ordained a priest for the Diocese of Hamilton, Ontario, by Bishop Anthony F. Tonnos on May 7, 1994. He served in 4 Parishes as Associate Pastor and 4 Parishes as Pastor.

=== Auxiliary Bishop of Hamilton ===
Pope Francis appointed His Excellency as auxiliary bishop for the Diocese of Hamilton on November 21, 2020. He was originally scheduled to be ordained on February 2, 2021, Feast of the Presentation of the Lord, however due to the pandemic his Episcopal Ordination was rescheduled and was celebrated on April 18, 2021, at the Cathedral Basilica of Christ the King in Hamilton. At the time of his appointment to be Bishop of Peterborough, he was holding the positions of the Vicar for Consecrated Life, one of the Vicars General, Vicar of Formation, and Vicar for Permanent Deacons in the Diocese of Hamilton.

=== Bishop of Peterborough ===
Pope Leo XIV appointed His Excellency, Bishop Lobsinger as Bishop for the Diocese of Peterborough on November 13, 2026. The date and location of His Excellency’s installation will be announced at a later date.
