= Kevin Malcolm =

Canadian gridiron football player (born 1991)

No. 50, 32, 54
- Position: Long snapper

Personal information
- Born: July 15, 1991 (age 35); Hamilton, Ontario, Canada
- Listed height: 5 ft 11 in (1.80 m)
- Listed weight: 230 lb (104 kg)

Career information
- High school: Bishop Tonnos Catholic (Ancaster, Ontario)
- University: McMaster (2010–2014)
- CFL draft: 2014: 7th round, 65th overall pick

Career history
- Ottawa Redblacks (2015–2017); Hamilton Tiger-Cats (2017–2018)

Awards and highlights
- Grey Cup champion (2016); Vanier Cup champion (2011)

Career CFL statistics
- Games played: 35
- Tackles: 4
- Stats at CFL.ca

Kevin Malcolm (born July 15, 1991) is a Canadian former professional football long snapper who played in the Canadian Football League (CFL) with the Ottawa Redblacks and Hamilton Tiger-Cats. He played CIS football for the McMaster Marauders.

== Early life ==
Malcolm was born on July 15, 1991, in Hamilton, Ontario. He attended Bishop Tonnos Catholic Secondary School in Ancaster, Ontario.

== College career ==
Malcolm played CIS football for the McMaster Marauders from 2010 to 2014. In his fourth season, he suffered a torn ACL after his leg was rolled up on by another player while blocking. Malcolm won a Vanier Cup in 2011 with McMaster, snapping the ball on the winning field goal.

== Professional career ==
=== Ottawa Redblacks ===
Malcolm was selected in the seventh round, with the 65th overall selection, by the Ottawa Redblacks in the 2014 CFL draft. He remained unsigned while recovering from the torn ACL he suffered while playing for McMaster. Malcolm played his first game in 2015 as the team's long snapper, recording two tackles. On September 16, 2016, he was placed on the injured list. While on the injured list, the Redblacks won the 104th Grey Cup. On May 8, 2017, Malcolm was released by the team.

=== Hamilton Tiger-Cats ===
On October 31, 2017, Malcolm was signed by the Hamilton Tiger-Cats. He played in one game in 2017. Malcolm then appeared in the first game of the 2018 season, before he was released by the team on June 21.
