= Joseph Francis Ryan =

Canadian Catholic bishop

- Bishop of Hamilton
- Diocese: Hamilton
- Installed: 1937
- Term ended: 1973
- Predecessor: John Thomas McNally
- Successor: Paul Francis Reding

Orders
- Ordination: May 21, 1921
- Consecration: October 19, 1937

Personal details
- Born: March 1, 1897 Dundas, Ontario, Canada
- Died: March 23, 1990 (aged 93) Hamilton, Ontario, Canada
- Buried: Holy Sepulchre Cemetery
- Education: St. Augustine's Seminary, Toronto
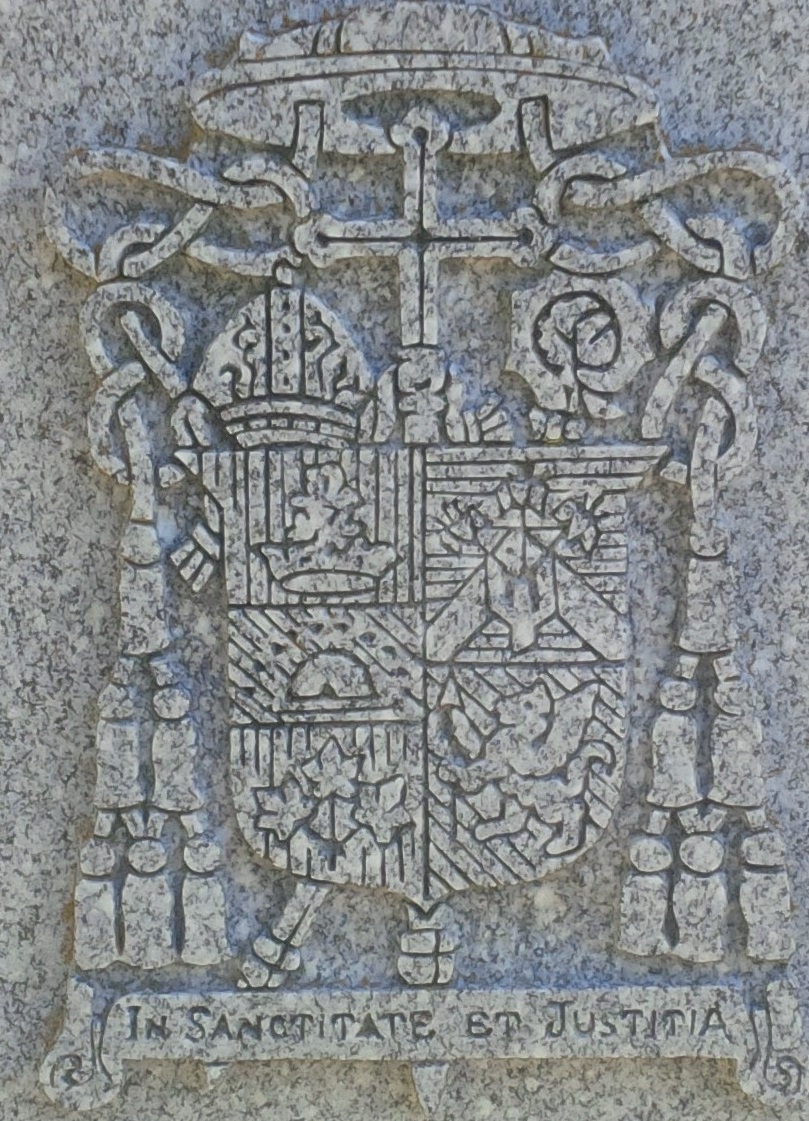
- Coat of arms

Joseph Francis Ryan (1 March 1897 – 23 March 1990) was a Canadian Roman Catholic prelate who has been the sixth Bishop of the Catholic Diocese of Hamilton, Ontario.

== Biography ==
Ryan was born in Dundas, Ontario and grew up in Hamilton, Ontario. He attended St. Mary's Elementary School in Hamilton, St. Jerome's College in Kitchener, and studied theology at St. Augustine's Seminary in Toronto. He was ordained to the priesthood by Bishop Thomas Joseph Dowling at St. Patrick's Church in Hamilton. He served his home parish of St. Mary's in Hamilton for five years, and then was sent to Rome to study canon law for two years.

When the Cathedral of Christ the King was opened in 1933, he was appointed the first rector by Bishop John McNally. When Bishop McNally was transferred to the Archdiocese of Halifax in 1937, Pope Pius XI appointed Ryan as the bishop of Hamilton.

He served as bishop of the diocese until his retirement in 1973. He passed away on March 23, 1990 and is buried in Holy Sepulchre Cemetery in Burlington, Ontario.

== Legacy ==
The Hamilton-Wentworth Catholic District School Board named one of their secondary schools in Hamilton in his honour, Bishop Ryan Catholic Secondary School.

Catholic Church titles
Preceded by John Thomas McNally	Roman Catholic Bishop of Hamilton; 1937–1973	Succeeded by Paul Francis Reding
