= Douglas Crosby =

Canadian prelate

The Most Reverend Douglas Crosby OMI
- 9th Bishop of Hamilton
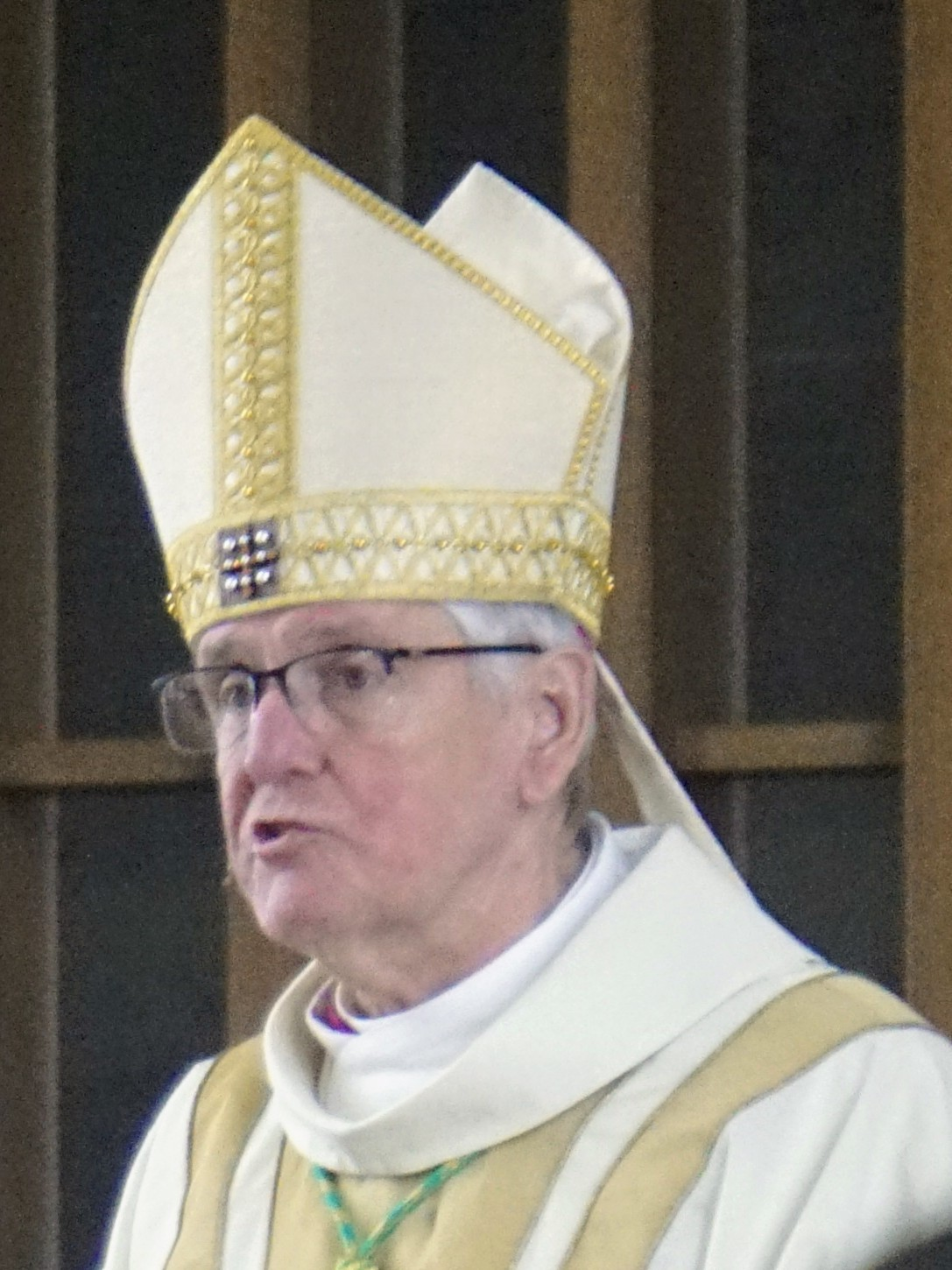
- Bishop Crosby in 2023
- See: Hamilton
- Installed: November 8, 2010
- Retired: November 1, 2025
- Predecessor: Anthony F. Tonnos
- Successor: Joseph Dabrowski
- Other posts: Bishop of St. George’s Corner Brook, Newfoundland and Labrador (2003–2007); Bishop of Corner Brook and Labrador (2007–2010)

Orders
- Ordination: September 27, 1975
- Consecration: January 2, 1998 by Peter Alfred Sutton

Personal details
- Born: David Douglas Crosby; June 28, 1949 (age 77) Marathon, Ontario, Canada
- Education: St. Patrick's College (BA); St. Paul University (BTh, MPS)
- Coat of arms

David Douglas Crosby OMI (born June 28, 1949) is a Canadian prelate of the Roman Catholic Church. He was the ninth Bishop of Hamilton from 2010 to 2025, having previously served as Bishop of St. George’s Corner Brook, Newfoundland and Labrador (2003–2007) and Bishop of Corner Brook and Labrador (2007–2010).

During the fall 2015 Plenary Assembly of the Canadian Conference of Catholic Bishops (CCCB), Crosby was elected president-elect of the conference and took office at the end of the fall Plenary Assembly. At that time, Bishop Crosby succeeded the outgoing president, Archbishop Paul-André Durocher, of the Roman Catholic Archdiocese of Gatineau, in Gatineau, Quebec, Canada. Bishop Crosby is a member of the Missionary Oblates of Mary Immaculate, though as a bishop his immediate superior is now the Pope. His two-year term as president of the conference ended in 2017, with the election of Bishop Lionel Gendron of the Roman Catholic Diocese of Saint-Jean-Longueuil in Longueuil, Quebec as president.

== Early life and education ==
Crosby was born in Marathon, Ontario as the oldest of seven children of Natalie and David Crosby. He graduated from St. Patrick's College at Carleton University in Ottawa in 1972 with a Bachelor of Arts degree in Philosophy and French. In 1975 he earned his Bachelor of Theology degree at St. Paul University and his Master of Pastoral Studies (Counselling) degree in 1976.

== Priesthood ==
Ordained in 1975, Crosby's first role was as assistant pastor of the Co-Cathedral of Our Lady of Perpetual Help in Labrador City where he served until 1981. He served as vocation director, coordinator of provincial services, Pastor of St. Joseph’s Parish in Ottawa, and eventually Provincial Superior of St. Peter’s Province of the Oblates of Mary Immaculate. While holding this position he was elected President of the Oblate Conference of Canada. Also during this time, Crosby held various position within the Canadian Conference of Catholic Bishops, including General Secretary.

Styles of Douglas Crosby
- Reference style: Bishop
- Spoken style: Your Excellency
- Religious style: The Most Reverend

=== Episcopal ministry ===
In 1997, Crosby was appointed Bishop of Labrador City-Schefferville and, in 2003, was appointed as the Bishop of St. George’s Corner Brook, Newfoundland and Labrador. In 2007, the Roman Catholic Diocese of St. George’s Corner Brook, Newfoundland and Labrador became the Roman Catholic Diocese of Corner Brook and Labrador with Crosby as Bishop.

Currently, Crosby is the co-treasurer of the Canadian Conference of Catholic Bishops. On September 24, 2010, Crosby was appointed as the successor to Anthony F. Tonnos as the Bishop of Hamilton. Bishop Crosby took possession of the Diocese during a ceremony at the Cathedral of Christ the King in Hamilton on November 8, 2010.
