= Diocese of Hamilton, Ontario =

Catholic ecclesiastical territory

Diocese of Hamilton Dioecesis Hamiltonensis
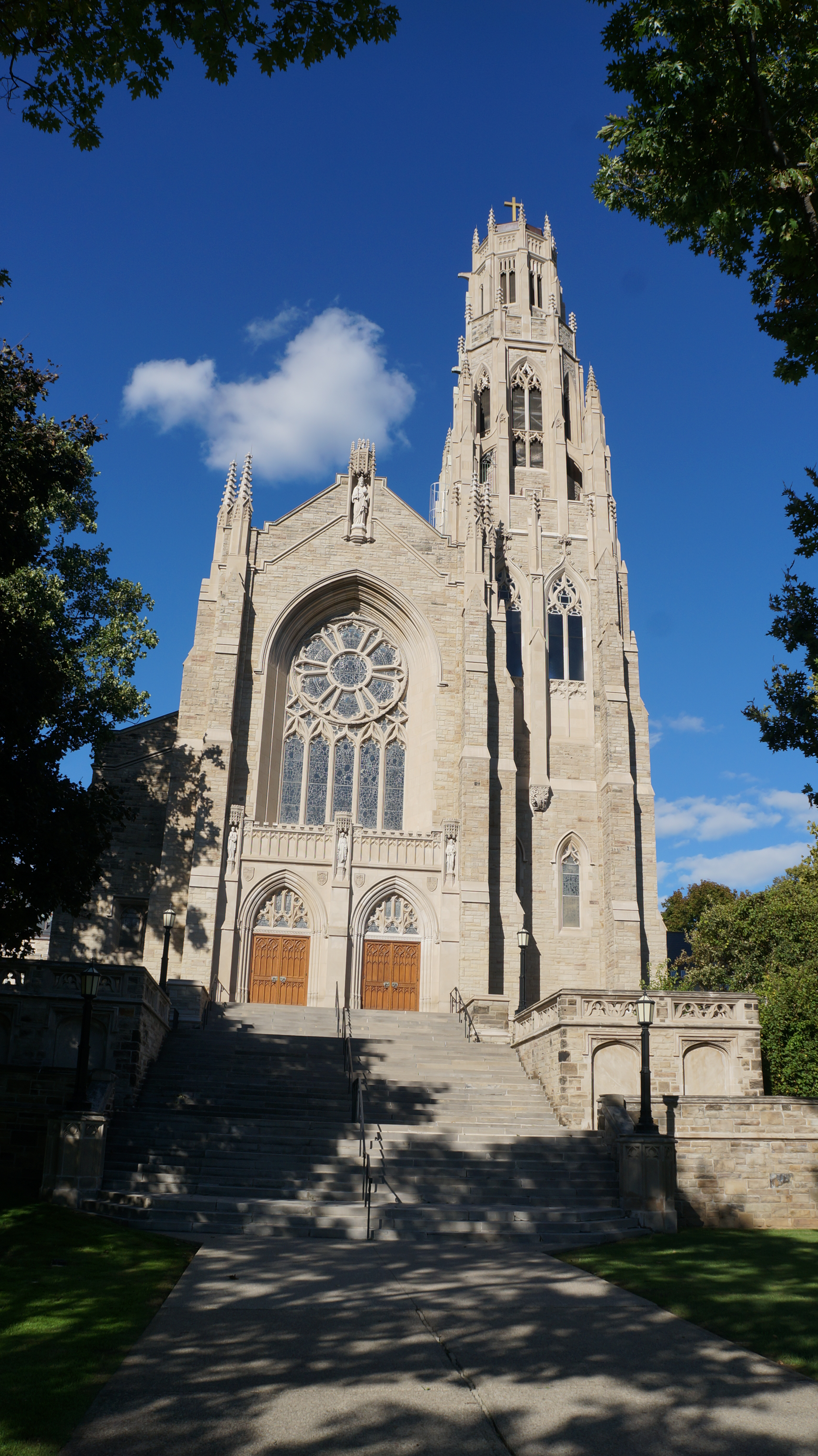

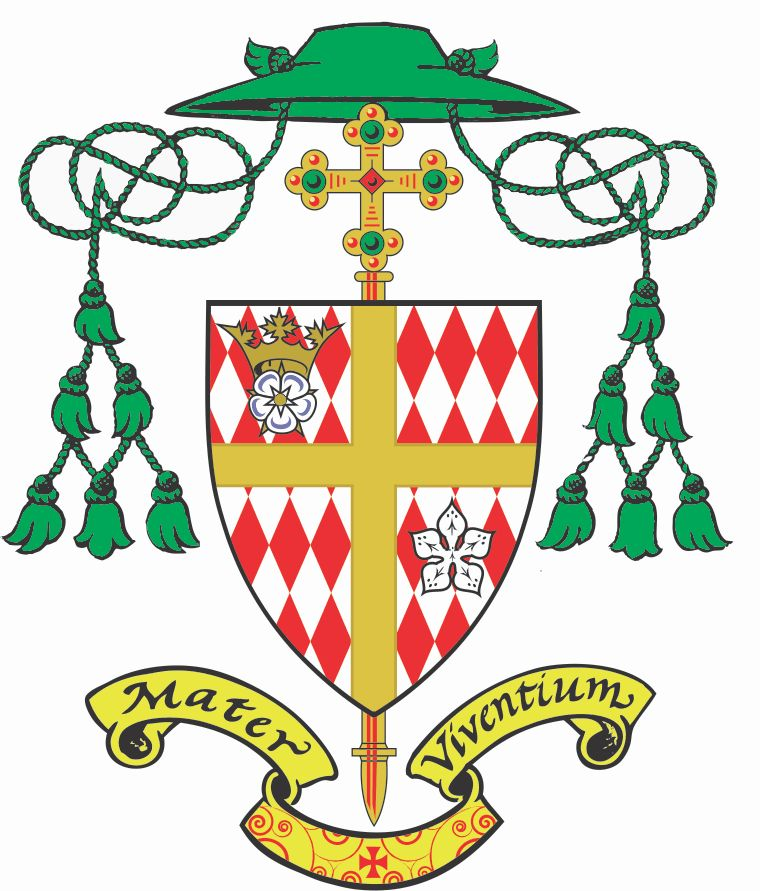
- Coat of arms

Location
- Country: Canada
- Metropolitan: Toronto
- Coordinates: 43°15′49″N 79°53′25″W

Statistics
- Area: 16,824 km^{2} (6,496 sq mi)
- Population: 620,518 (32.4%)
- Parishes: 124

Information
- Denomination: Catholic Church
- Sui iuris church: Latin Church
- Rite: Roman Rite
- Established: February 29, 1856
- Cathedral: Cathedral Basilica of Christ the King
- Patron saint: Blessed Virgin Mary in the mystery of the Annunciation
- Secular priests: 228

Current leadership
- Pope: Leo XIV
- Bishop: Joseph Dabrowski
- Metropolitan Archbishop: Frank Leo
- Auxiliary Bishops: Wayne Lawrence Lobsinger
- Vicar General: Murray J. Kroetsch
- Bishops emeritus: Douglas Crosby; Anthony F. Tonnos; Matthew Francis Ustrzycki

Website
- hamiltondiocese.com

The Diocese of Hamilton (Latin: Dioecesis Hamiltonensis) is a Latin Church ecclesiastical territory or diocese of the Catholic Church in Canada. It is a suffragan diocese in the ecclesiastical province of the metropolitan Archdiocese in Toronto.

The cathedral is the Cathedral Basilica of Christ the King, dedicated to Christ the King in 1933, in Hamilton, Ontario. There is a former cathedral, St. Mary’s Pro-Cathedral, also in Hamilton and a minor basilica, Our Lady Immaculate, in Guelph, Ontario.

== History ==
It was established on 29 February 1856 by Pope Pius IX as the Diocese of Hamilton, on territory split off from the Archdiocese of Toronto, which became its Metropolitan. On 22 November 1958, it lost territory to establish the Diocese of Saint Catharines. The Diocese of Hamilton celebrated its 150th anniversary in 2006, with Anthony Tonnos celebrating Mass at the seat of the diocese. Special signs, marks and posters were commissioned for many of the diocese's churches, schools and buildings.

== Bishops ==
=== Episcopal ordinaries ===
- John Farrell (1856.02.29 – death 28 September 1873), a native of Ireland, consecrated May 11, 1856. He introduced Catholic schools, built St. Mary's Cathedral, and helped to establish the academies of the Ladies of Loretto in Hamilton and Guelph. He also encouraged the founding of St. Jerome's College by the Fathers of the Resurrection, and confided the Owen Sound Missions to the Basilian Fathers. The CRC had been formed in 1836 in Paris. Many of its members were Polish emigres who left their native country in a time of political turmoil.
- P. F. Crinnon (1874.02.03 – death November 25, 1882), also born in Ireland and consecrated April 19, 1873. He built St. Patrick's Church in Hamilton, Ontario, established the House of Providence, Dundas and secured a site for Holy Sepulchre Cemetery.
- James Joseph Carbery (1883.09.04 – death 17 December 1887 in Ireland), Dominican Order (O.P.) also born in Ireland, consecrated on November 11, 1883, and held an important diocesan synod.
- T. J. Dowling, D.D., first Canadian incumbent (1889.01.11 – death 1924.08.06), previously Bishop of Peterborough (Canada) (1886.12.14 – 1889.01.11). Since his May 1889 installment, 14 new parishes had been established, 28 priests ordained, and 22 new churches, schools and presbyteries erected. Catholic hospitals at Hamilton and Guelph, and the new House of Providence at Dundas were also established in his time. During Dowling's time, there were 42 priests in the diocese of Canadian by birth. Four were from Ireland, four from the United States, four from France, three from Germany, two from Poland and two from Italy. Candidates for the priesthood studied at St. Jerome's College in Berlin, Ontario (now called Kitchener, Ontario) and Grand Seminary in Montreal, Quebec. The diocese had nine parishes for German-speaking people and one Indian parish. There were also chapels for Poles and Italians.
- John Thomas McNally (1924.08.12 – 1937.02.17), previously Bishop of Calgary (Canada) (1913.04.04 – 1924.08.12); later Metropolitan Archbishop of Halifax (Canada) (1937.02.17 – 1952.11.18).
- Joseph F. Ryan (1937.08.16 – retired 1973.03.27), died 1990. His term brought much growth and expansion of churches and Catholic schools.
- Paul F. Reding (1973.09.14 – death 1983.12.08) succeeding as previous Auxiliary Bishop of Hamilton (1966.07.02 – 1973.09.14) and Titular Bishop of Liberalia (1966.07.02 – 1973.09.14)
- Anthony F. Tonnos (2 May 1984 – retired on 8 November 2010, informally remaining active), succeeding as previous Auxiliary Bishop of Hamilton (1983.05.13 – 1984.05.02) and Titular Bishop of Nationa (1983.05.13 – 1984.05.02)
- Douglas Crosby (8 November 2010 – 1 November 2025), also vice-president of Canadian Conference of Catholic Bishops (2013.09.25 – 2015.09.15), President of Canadian Conference of Catholic Bishops (2015.09.15 – ...); previously Bishop of the Bishop of Labrador City–Schefferville (Canada) (1997.10.24 – 2007.05.31), Bishop of Saint George’s (Canada) (2003.08.06 – 2007.05.31), Bishop of Corner Brook and Labrador (Newfoundland and Labrador, Canada) (2007.05.31 – 2010.09.24)
- Joseph Dabrowski (2 February 2026 – present) Previously Bishop of Charlottetown (Canada) (April 2, 2023 - November 1, 2025), auxiliary Bishop of London (Ontario, Canada)(April 14, 2015 - April 2. 2023) and Titular Bishop of Casae in Numidia (April 14, 2015 - April 2. 2023)

=== Auxiliary bishops ===
- Paul Francis Reding (1966–1973), appointed Bishop here
- James Hector MacDonald (1978–1982), Titular Bishop of Gibba (1978.02.09 – 1982.08.12); next Bishop of Charlottetown (Canada) (1982.08.12 – 1991.02.02), Metropolitan Archbishop of Saint John’s (Newfoundland, Canada) (1991.02.02 – retired 2000.12.04)
- Anthony Frederick Tonnos (1982–1983), appointed Bishop here
- Matthew Francis Ustrzycki (1985–2007), Titular Bishop of Nationa (1985.05.10 – ...)
- Gerard Paul Bergie (2005–2010), Titular Bishop of Tabæ (2005.07.11 – 2010.09.14); next Bishop of Saint Catharines (Ontario, Canada) (2010.09.14 – ...)
- Daniel Joseph Miehm (2013–2017), appointed Bishop of Peterborough, Ontario; Titular Bishop of Gor (2013.02.20 – 2017.03.10)
- Wayne Lawrence Lobsinger (2020–2026), appointed Bishop of Peterborough, Ontario

=== Other priests of this diocese who became bishops ===
- Joseph Anthony O'Sullivan, appointed Bishop of Charlottetown, Prince Edward Island in 1931
- Joseph Lawrence Wilhelm, appointed Auxiliary Bishop of Calgary, Alberta in 1963
- John Michael Sherlock, appointed Auxiliary Bishop of London, Ontario in 1974
- Thomas Christopher Collins, appointed Coadjutor Bishop of Saint Paul in Alberta in 1997; elevated to the rank of Cardinal in 2012
- Peter Joseph Hundt, appointed Auxiliary Bishop of Toronto, Ontario in 2006

== Statistics and extent ==
As of 2014, it pastorally served 626,723 Catholics (28.5% of 2,201,155 total) on 16,824 km^{2} in 124 parishes and 1 mission with 228 priests (137 diocesan, 91 religious), 35 deacons, 269 lay religious (102 brothers, 167 sisters) and 15 seminarians.

The Diocese of Hamilton comprises the counties and regions of Brant, Bruce, Grey, Halton, Hamilton, Waterloo, Wellington, as well as four Townships in the County of Dufferin, all located in Ontario. The Diocese of Hamilton had begun as a Catholic Mission in Upper Canada (Ontario). There are 6 deaneries (Brant, Bruce-Grey, Halton, Hamilton, Waterloo and Wellington) which have 126 parishes in their geographical grouping. There are 7 Catholic school boards in the diocese, 1 Catholic university and 3 university Catholic campus ministries. It has 142 secular and 98 religious priests ministering to 620,518 people in 126 parishes.

=== Catholic schools ===
The Government of Ontario accords Catholic schools the same rights as public schools. The taxes paid by Catholics go to support Catholic schools only. Teachers, whether religious or lay, must be qualified to teach according to the same regulations as those governing public school teachers.

Here are the institutions, within the jurisdiction of the Diocese:

- Conseil scolaire catholique MonAvenir
- Hamilton-Wentworth Catholic District School Board
- Halton Catholic District School Board
- Brant Haldimand Norfolk Catholic District School Board
- Wellington Catholic District School Board
- Waterloo Catholic District School Board
- Bruce-Grey Catholic District School Board

=== Cemeteries ===
- Holy Sepulchre Catholic Cemetery (Burlington West-Hamilton Centre)
- Gates of Heaven Catholic Cemetery (Burlington West-Hamilton Centre)
- Our Lady of Angels Catholic Cemetery (Hamilton East-Stoney Creek)
- Resurrection Catholic Cemetery (Hamilton West-Ancaster-Dundas)
- Marymount Catholic Cemetery (Waterloo-Guelph-Wellington)
- Holy Cross Catholic Cemetery (Cambridge-Brantford-Brant)
- Holy Redeemer Catholic Cemetery (Erin-Halton Hills)
- Holy Family Catholic Cemetery (Burlington East-Milton-Oakville)

== Religious orders ==
Hamilton has been home to a number of Catholic religious orders and had many more minister within it.

=== Communities of Women ===
- Sisters of St. Joseph of Hamilton
- Congregation of the Sisters of St. Anne
- Felician Franciscan Sisters
- Institute of Kkottongnae Sisters of Jesus
- Poor of Jesus Christ
- School Sisters of Notre Dame
- Sisters of Charity of St. Vincent de Paul of Zagreb
- Sisters of Our Lady Immaculate
- Sisters of St. John the Baptist
- Sisters of the Immaculate Heart of Mary
- Sisters of the Precious Blood
- Sisters Servants of Mary Immaculate
- Society of the Sacred Heart of Jesus
- Ursuline Sisters of Chatham

=== Communities of Men ===
- Barnabite Fathers
- Carmelites of Mary Immaculate
- Comboni Missionaries
- Congregation of the Holy Cross
- Congregation of the Most Holy Redeemer (Redemptorists)
- Congregation of the Resurrection
- Discalced Carmelites
- Franciscan Fathers
- Holy Ghost Congregation (Spiritans)
- Hospitaller Order of St. John of God
- Ignatius Jesuit Centre, Loyola House
- Jesuit Fathers - Upper Canada Province
- Legionaries of Christ
- Oblates of Mary Immaculate
- Order of Preachers (Dominican)
- Pallottine Fathers
- Salesians of St. Don Bosco
- Society of Christ
- Voluntas Dei Institute

== Gallery ==
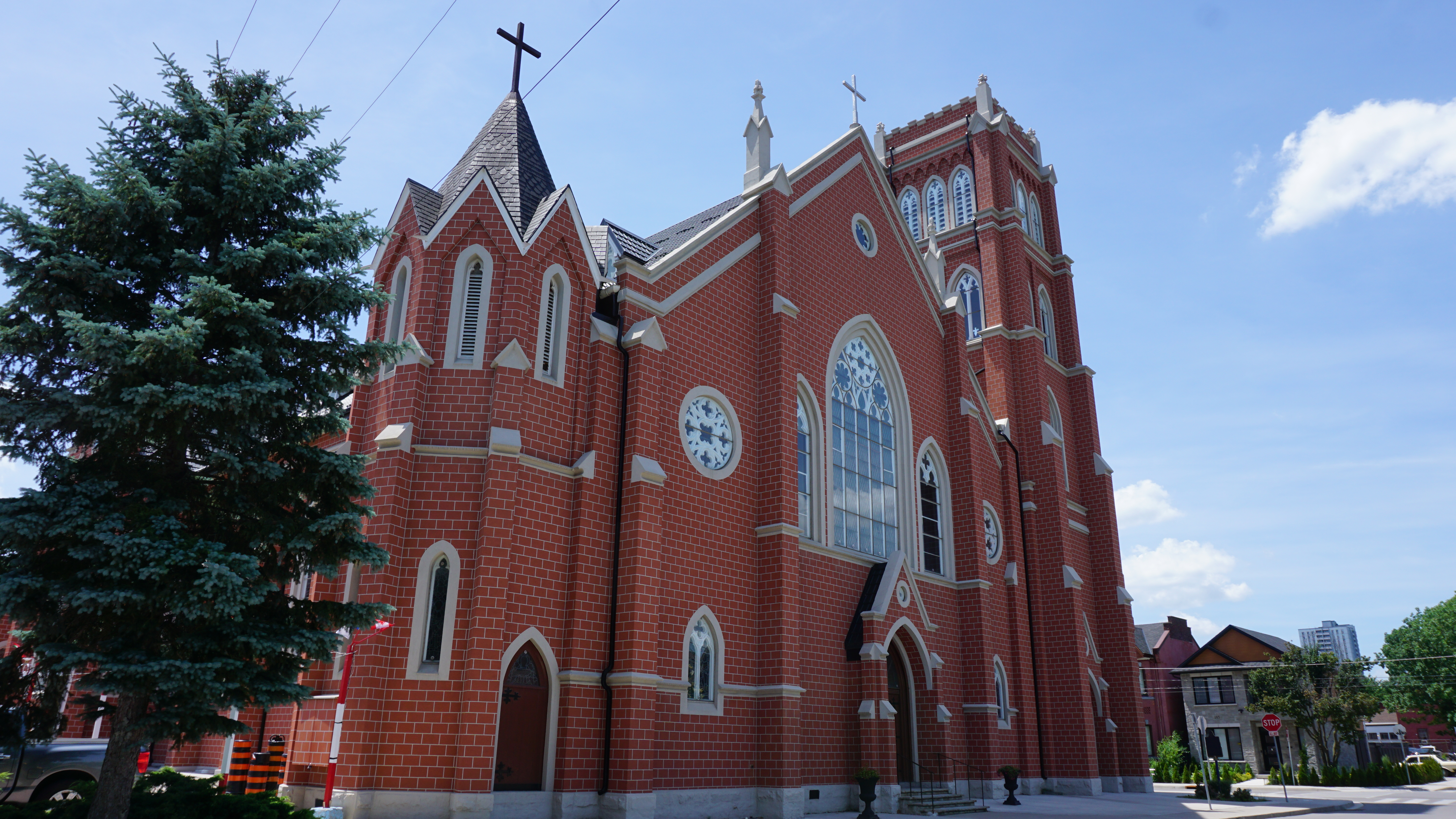
St Mary's Pro-Cathedral. Cathedral from 1856 to 1927

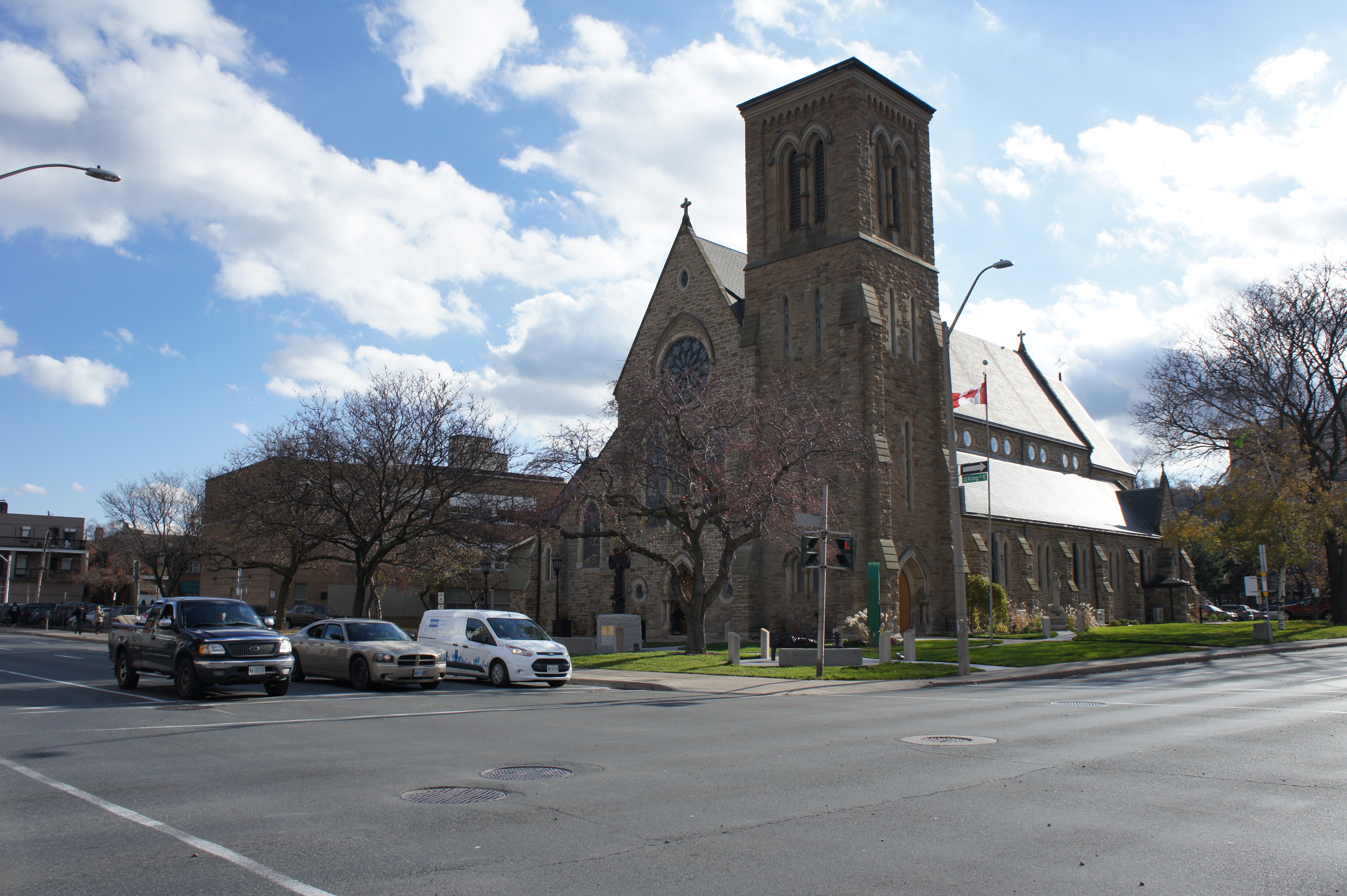
St. Patrick's Church. Cathedral from 1927 to 1933

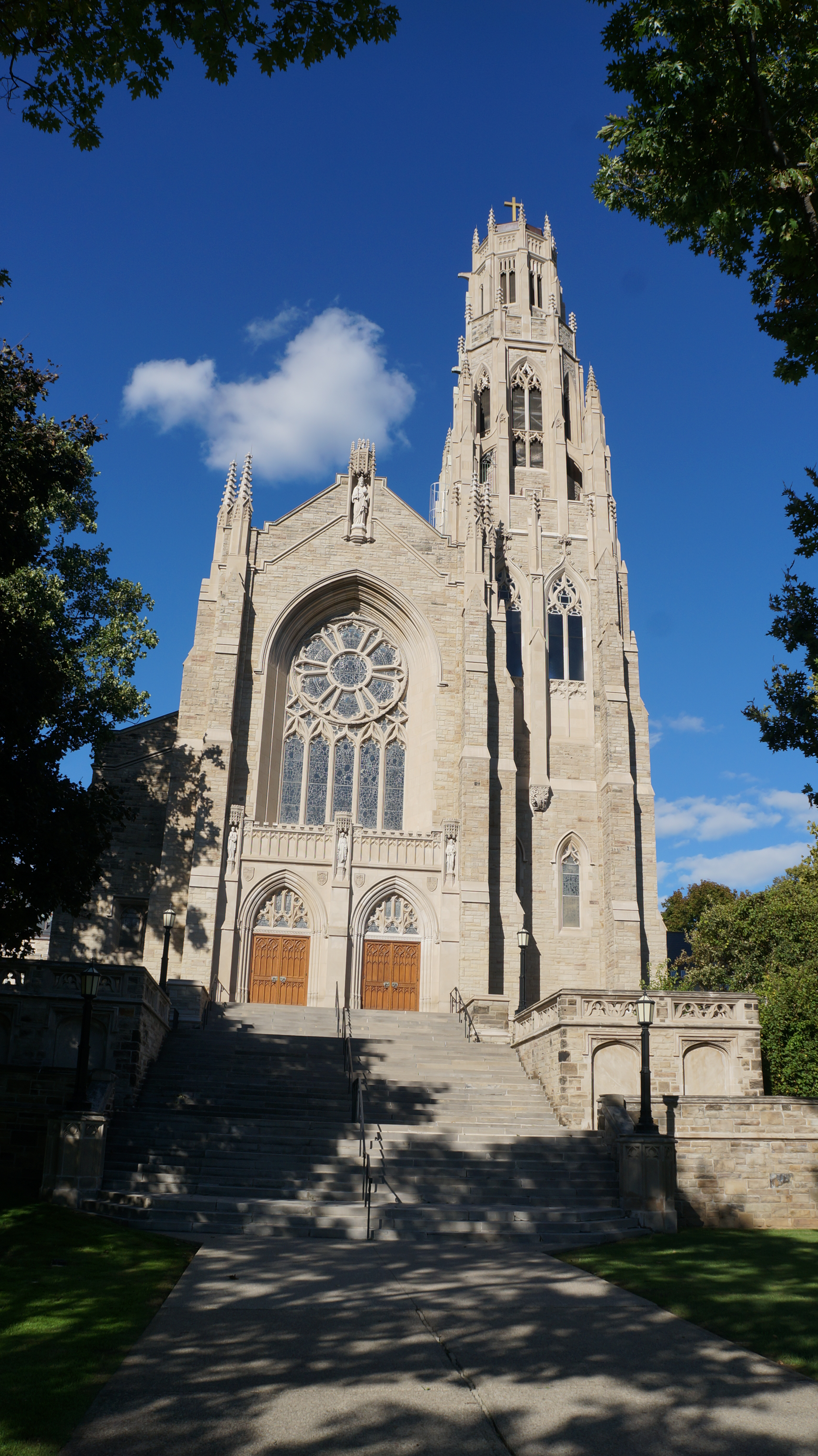
Cathedral of Christ the King (Hamilton). Cathedral from 1933–Present

== See also ==
- List of Catholic dioceses in Canada
- Loyola House
- Ignatius Jesuit Centre

== Sources and external links ==
- Diocese of Hamilton website
- GCatholic, with Google map and satellite photo data for most sections
- Catholic Hierarchy - Diocese of Hamilton
- Herbermann, Charles, ed. (1913). "Diocese of Hamilton". Catholic Encyclopedia. New York: Robert Appleton Company.
- Detailed Short History
- Holy Sepulchre Cemetery
