= Paul Francis Reding =

Canadian prelate

The Most Reverend Paul Francis Reding
- Diocese of Hamilton, Ontario
- Diocese: Diocese of Hamilton
- Installed: September 14, 1973
- Term ended: December 8, 1983
- Predecessor: Joseph Francis Ryan
- Successor: Anthony F. Tonnos
- Previous posts: Auxiliary Bishop of Hamilton and Titular Bishop of Liberalia (1966–1973)

Orders
- Ordination: June 3, 1950
- Consecration: September 14, 1966

Personal details
- Born: February 14, 1925 Hamilton, Ontario, Canada
- Died: December 8, 1982 (aged 57)
- Buried: Holy Sepulchre Cemetery, Burlington, Ontario, Canada
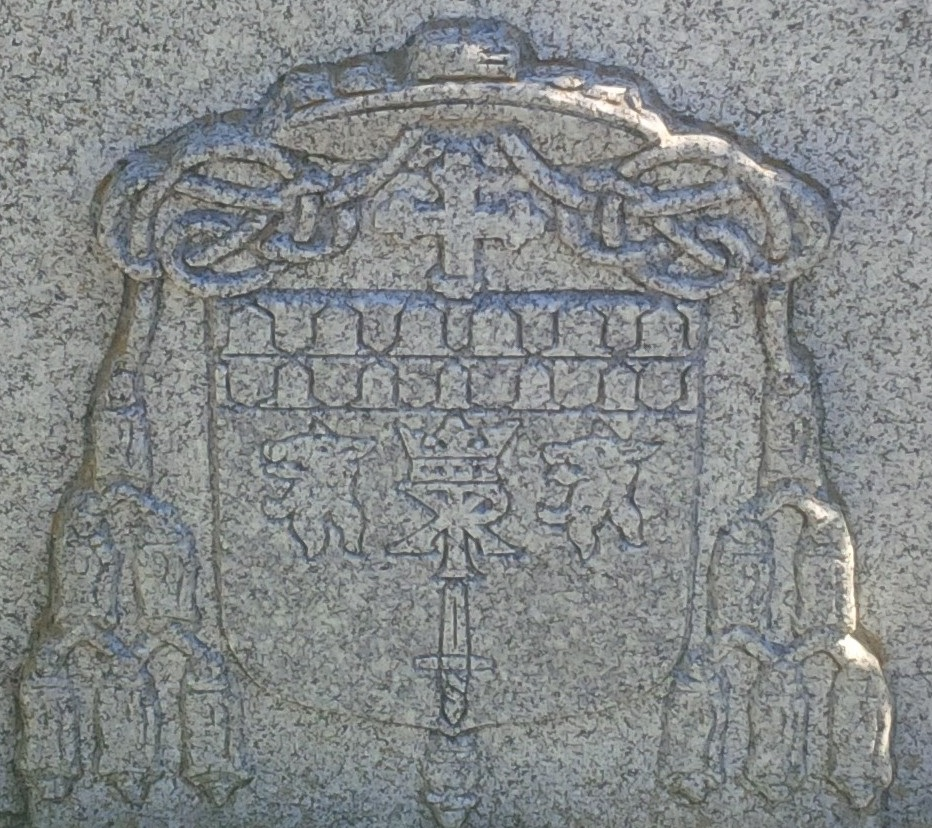
- Coat of arms: Paul Francis Reding's coat of arms

Styles of Paul Francis Reding
- Reference style: Bishop
- Spoken style: Your Grace
- Religious style: The Most Reverend

Ordination history of Paul Francis Reding
History
Episcopal consecration
- Principal consecrator: Joseph Francis Ryan (Hamilton, ON)
- Co-consecrators: Michael Alphonsus Harrington (Kamloops, BC); Joseph Lawrence Wilhelm (Titular Bishop of Saccæa)
Episcopal succession
Bishops consecrated by Paul Francis Reding as principal consecrator
- John Michael Sherlock: August, 28 1974
- Brian Leo John Hennessy: May 14, 1975
- James Hector MacDonald: April 17, 1978

Paul Francis Reding (February 14, 1924 – December 8, 1983) was a Canadian prelate who served as the seventh Bishop of Hamilton from November 1973 until his death in 1982.

== Career ==
He was ordained on June 3, 1950 and was appointed Titular Bishop of Liberalia and Auxiliary Bishop of Hamilton on July 2, 1966. At the time of his appointment, he was the rector of the Cathedral of Christ the King and chancellor of the diocese.

He was appointed the bishop of Hamilton in 1973. During his tenure as bishop, he ordained future cardinal, Thomas Christopher Collins to the priesthood. He died from cancer on December 8, 1982. His resting place is located at Holy Sepulchre Cemetery in Burlington.

Halton Catholic District School Board has a secondary school in Milton that was named in his honour.

Catholic Church titles
Preceded by Joseph Francis Ryan	Roman Catholic Bishop of Hamilton; 1973–1983	Succeeded by Anthony F. Tonnos
