= Diocese of Corner Brook and Labrador =

Catholic ecclesiastical territory

Coordinates: 48.9500°N 57.9500°W

Diocese of Corner Brook and Labrador Dioecesis Riviangulanensis-Labradorensis

Location
- Country: Canada
- Ecclesiastical province: St. John's

Statistics
- Population: 27,200 (40.9%)
- Parishes: 28

Information
- Denomination: Roman Catholic
- Rite: Roman Rite
- Established: 9 May 1870
- Cathedral: Cathedral of the Most Holy Redeemer and Immaculate Conception, Corner Brook
- Co-cathedral: Basilica of our Lady of Perpetual Help, Labrador City
- Secular priests: 40

Current leadership
- Pope: Leo XIV
- Bishop: Bart van Roijen

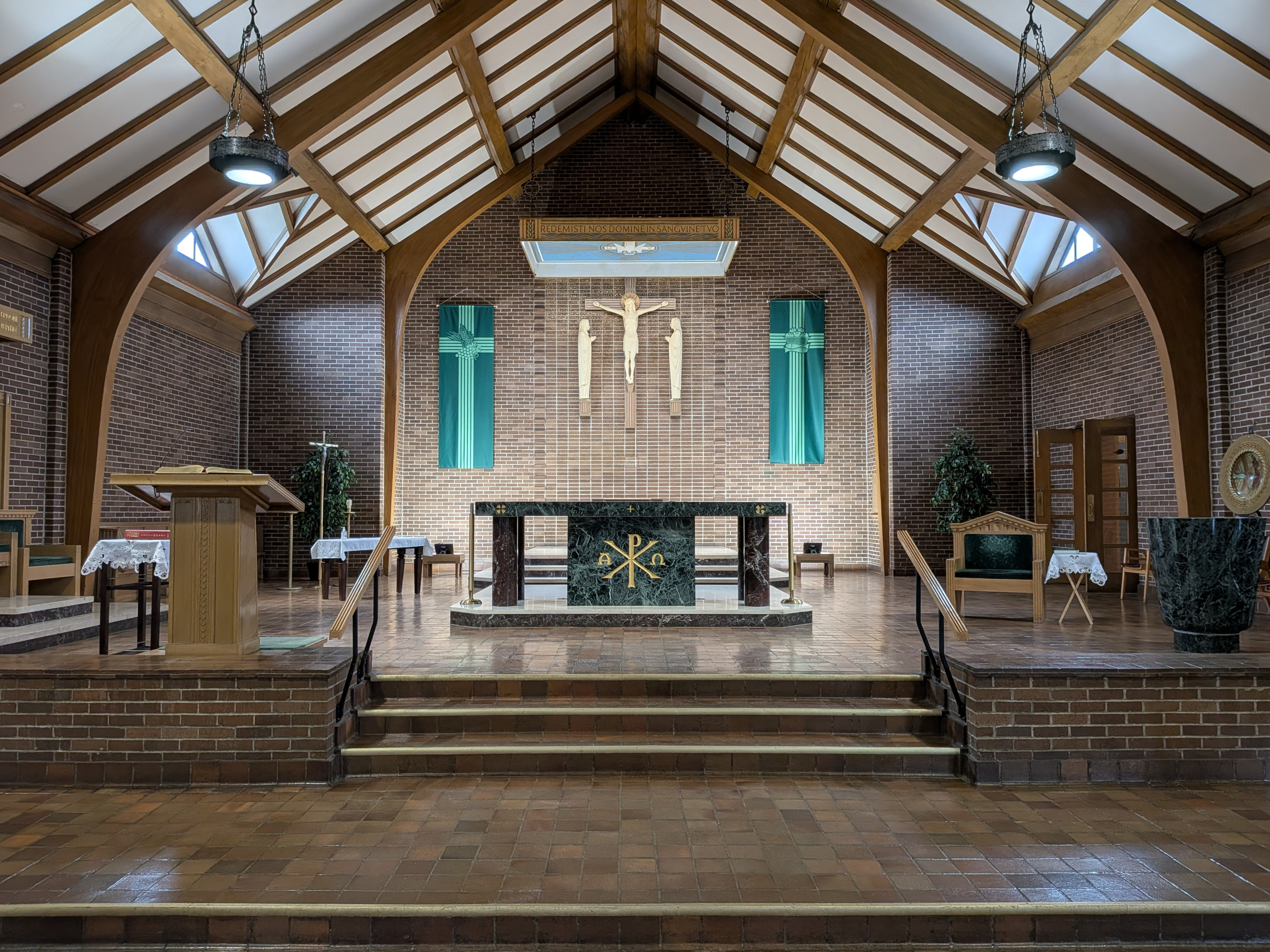
Sanctuary of the Cathedral Parish of the Most Holy Redeemer Parish and Immaculate Conception, in Corner Brook

The Roman Catholic Diocese of Corner Brook and Labrador (Latin: Dioecesis Riviangulanensis-Labradorensis) (erected 9 May 1870, as the Prefecture Apostolic of Western Newfoundland) is a suffragan of the Archdiocese of St. John's, Newfoundland. The Cathedral of the diocese is located in Corner Brook.

== History ==
The Diocese of Corner Brook and Labrador was erected on 9 May 1870 as the Prefecture Apostolic of Western Newfoundland. It was re-erected as an apostolic vicariate on 28 April 1892 and as the Diocese of Saint George's on 18 February 1904.

In 2007, the diocese was expanded and its name was changed from "St. George's" to "Corner Brook and Labrador". This was done by incorporating nearly the entirety of the Diocese of Labrador into the Diocese of St. George. The Diocese of Labrador had been predominantly cared for by the Oblates since 1847 but their mission in Labrador came to an end when Fr. Chris Rushton, the last Oblate to leave, departed in 2013.

Also in 2007, the Basilica of our Lady of Perpetual Help in the diocese was decreed a basilica. The Basilica was the cathedral of the former Diocese of Labrador City–Schefferville.

== Ordinaries ==
- Thomas Sears (1871 - 1885)
- Michael Francis Howley (1885 - 1895), appointed Bishop of St. John’s, Newfoundland
- Neil McNeil (1895 - 1910), appointed Archbishop of Vancouver, British Columbia
- Michael Fintan Power (1911 - 1920)
- Henry Thomas Renouf (1920 - 1941)
- Michael O'Reilly (1941 - 1970)
- Richard Thomas McGrath (1970 - 1985)
- Raymond John Lahey (1986 - 2003), appointed Bishop of Antigonish, Nova Scotia
- David Douglas Crosby, O.M.I. (2003 - September 2010), appointed Bishop of Hamilton
- Peter Joseph Hundt (1 March 2011 - Dec 12, 2018); had been an Auxiliary Bishop of the Roman Catholic Archdiocese of Toronto, Ontario; appointed Archbishop of Saint John’s, Newfoundland
- Bart van Roijen (12 December 2019 - present) At the time of his appointment he was serving as Vicar General of the Diocese of Nelson.

== See also ==
- Doe v Bennett, a Supreme Court of Canada legal ruling involving the Diocese.
