= Brendan O'Brien (bishop) =

Canadian Catholic archbishop (born 1943)

The Most Reverend Brendan Michael O'Brien
- Archbishop of Kingston
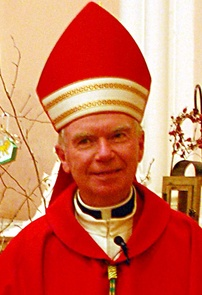
- Church: Roman Catholic Church
- See: Kingston
- In office: June 3, 2007—March 28, 2019
- Predecessor: Anthony Giroux Meagher
- Successor: Michael Mulhall
- Previous posts: Bishop of Pembroke, Archbishop of St. John's (Newfoundland)

Orders
- Ordination: June 1, 1968
- Consecration: June 29, 1987 by Joseph-Aurèle Plourde

Personal details
- Born: September 28, 1943 (age 82) Ottawa, Ontario
- Coat of arms

Styles of Brendan Michael O'Brien
- Reference style: The Most Reverend
- Spoken style: Your Grace
- Religious style: Archbishop

Brendan Michael O'Brien (born September 28, 1943) is a Canadian prelate of the Roman Catholic Church. He served as Archbishop of Kingston from 2007 to 2019. He was previously Archbishop of St. John's (Newfoundland) and Bishop of Pembroke (Ontario).

== Early life and ministry ==
Brendan Michael O'Brien was born in Ottawa, the oldest of the seven children of Redmond and Margaret (née Foran) O'Brien. He attended the University of Ottawa and St. Paul University, from where he earned his licentiates in philosophy and theology, before being ordained to the priesthood on June 1, 1968, at St George's Church (Ottawa).

Father O'Brien then did pastoral work in Ottawa and served as Co-Director of the Diocesan Synod. In 1971 he went to Rome, where he studied at the Pontifical Lateran University's Accademia Alfonsianum, from which he obtained a doctorate in moral theology. O'Brien, upon his return to Canada in 1975, taught at his alma mater of St. Paul University and served as pastor of an Ottawa parish.

== Episcopate ==
On May 6, 1987, O'Brien was appointed Auxiliary Bishop of Ottawa and Titular Bishop of Numana by Pope John Paul II. He received his episcopal consecration on the following June 29 from Archbishop Joseph-Aurèle Plourde, with Bishops John Beahen and Gilles Bélisle serving as co-consecrators. O'Brien was later named Bishop of Pembroke on May 5, 1993, and Archbishop of St. John's on December 4, 2000.

Pope Benedict XVI, on June 3, 2007, named O'Brien to succeed the late Anthony G. Meagher as Archbishop of Kingston. O'Brien's installation as Kingston's ordinary took place on July 25, 2007.

He was once State Chaplain for the Knights of Columbus in Ontario. From 2003 to 2005, he was President of the Canadian Episcopal Conference, of which he currently sits on the Social Affairs Commission.

Catholic Church titles
Preceded by James Hector MacDonald	Archbishop of St. John's; 2000–2007	Succeeded by Martin William Currie
