= Martin William Currie =

Canadian Catholic bishop (b. 1943)

The Most Reverend Martin William Currie
- Archbishop Emeritus of St. John's, Newfoundland
- Installed: 18 October 2007
- Term ended: 12 December 2018
- Predecessor: Brendan O'Brien
- Successor: Peter Hundt
- Other post: Bishop of Grand Falls (2001-2011)

Orders
- Ordination: 12 May 1968
- Consecration: 31 January 2001 by Paolo Romeo

Personal details
- Born: December 11, 1943 (age 82) Marinette, Nova Scotia, Canada
- Motto: Dominus fortitudo sperantium; (those who hope in the Lord will have their strength renewed)
- Coat of arms

Martin William Currie (born December 11, 1943) is a Canadian Catholic who was the seventh archbishop of the Archdiocese of St. John's, Newfoundland. He retired in 2018 and holds the title of Archbishop Emeritus of St. John's. He had previously served as the Bishop of Grand Falls.

== Life ==
Currie was born in Marinette, a small village near Sheet Harbour, Nova Scotia, the third of nine children of Everett and Mabel (Walsh) Currie. His father was a woodsman. His paternal family is of Scottish origin and has connections to the MacDonald and MacPherson clans.

After studying at St. Francis Xavier University and at Holy Heart Seminary in Halifax (now part of Atlantic School of Theology), Currie was ordained priest in 1968. From 1968 to 1974, Fr. Currie served as assistant in St. Patrick's Parish, Halifax and St. Charles Parish, Amherst. From 1975 to 1980, he was a missionary and parish priest in Chiclayo, Peru. In 1992, he became vicar general of the Archdiocese of Halifax. In 1998, he was diocesan administrator of the archdiocese.

In 2001, Martin William Currie was consecrated and appointed to the Diocese of Grand Falls. From September 2006 to May 2007, he served concurrently as Apostolic Administrator of the Diocese of Saint John, New Brunswick. Pope Benedict XVI appointed him Archbishop of St. John's in October 2007. He was installed in his Archdiocese on November 30, 2007, and received the pallium of metropolitan bishops on June 29, 2008. In spite of his new and higher office, Archbishop Curie continued to exercise his functions as Bishop of Grand Falls until his retirement as bishop there on 1 March 2011, when Robert Anthony Daniels, the Auxiliary Bishop of the Roman Catholic Diocese of London in Ontario, was selected by the pope to take his place there.

In a 2018 interview with CBC News, in looking back over his fifty years as a priest, Currie said that the vow of celibacy required of Catholic priests has been difficult, and that he would have made a good father and husband. In comparison to the families of his siblings, Curries recalled that as a young priest in Lunenburg, "I would say Mass at Bridgewater...on a Christmas evening...[People] would be saying 'Merry Christmas' and wave to me. They would go home with their family and I would go home and sit by the tree by myself. The loneliness of the life was sometimes troubling." Upon his anticipated retirement, Currie plans to return to Nova Scotia to be closer to family.

The motto in Archbishop Currie's Coat of Arms is "Dominus fortitudo sperantium" - "... those who hope in the Lord will have their strength renewed ...". (Isaiah 40:31).

Catholic Church titles
Preceded by Joseph Faber MacDonald	Bishop of Grand Falls; 2001–2011	Succeeded by Robert Anthony Daniels
Preceded by Brendan Michael O'Brien	Archbishop of St. John's; 2007–2018	Succeeded by Peter Joseph Hundt
