= James Hector MacDonald =

Canadian Roman Catholic prelate (1925–2025)

- Archbishop Emeritus of St. John's, Newfoundland
- Archdiocese: St. John's, Newfoundland
- Appointed: February 2, 1991
- Term ended: December 4, 2000
- Previous posts: Auxiliary Bishop of Hamilton, Ontario and Titular Bishop of Gibba (1978–1982); Bishop of Charlottetown (1982–1991)

Orders
- Ordination: June 29, 1953
- Consecration: April 17, 1978 by Paul Francis Reding

Personal details
- Born: April 28, 1925 Whycocomagh, Nova Scotia, Canada
- Died: May 30, 2025 (aged 100) St. Catharines, Ontario, Canada

James Hector MacDonald, CSC (April 28, 1925 – May 30, 2025) was a Canadian Roman Catholic prelate. He served as archbishop of the Roman Catholic Archdiocese of St. John's, Newfoundland from 1991 to 2000.

MacDonald died at the Hotel Dieu Shaver Hospital in St. Catharines, Ontario, on May 30, 2025, at the age of 100.

Catholic Church titles
Preceded by Alphonsus Liguori Penney	Archbishop of St. John's; 1991–2000	Succeeded by Brendan Michael O'Brien
Preceded by Francis John Spence	Bishop of Charlottetown; 1982–1991	Succeeded by Vernon Fougère
Preceded by Émile Élie Verhille	Titular Bishop of Gibba; 1978–1982	Succeeded by Serafín Luis Alberto Cartagena Ocaña
Preceded by —	Auxiliary Bishop of Hamilton; 1978–1982	Succeeded by —
