= John Farrell (bishop) =

- Bishop of Hamilton, Ontario
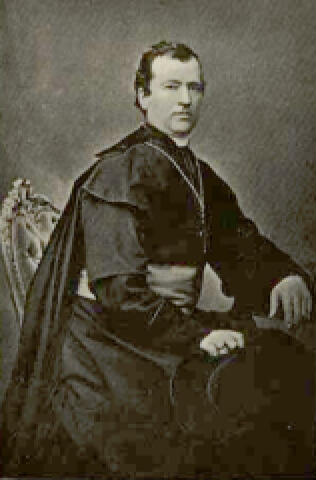
- Diocese: Hamilton, Ontario
- Appointed: 1856
- Term ended: 1873
- Successor: Peter Francis Crinnon

Personal details
- Born: 2 June 1820 Armagh, Ireland
- Died: 26 September 1873 (aged 53) Hamilton, Ontario

John Farrell (2 June 1820 – 26 September 1873) was a Canadian Roman Catholic priest and Bishop of Hamilton, Ontario from 1856 to 1873.

Bishop John Farrell was the first Bishop of the Diocese of Hamilton. He was of Irish descent, born in Armagh, on 2 June 1820. His family moved to Canada in 1832 and settled in Kingston, Ontario. Following his ordination in October 1845, he served briefly in Kingston, teaching at Regiopolis College. In 1853 he was appointed pastor of Peterborough. Three years later he was named as the first bishop of the newly formed Diocese of Hamilton. He was consecrated bishop in Kingston on 11 May 1856 and shortly afterwards installed as the Bishop of Hamilton. Bishop Farrell was dedicated to establishing a solid separate Catholic school system. By the end of his seventeen-year tenure as Bishop, twenty-six separate schools were functioning within the diocese. Bishop Farrell also encouraged the founding of what has become St. Jerome's University in Kitchener-Waterloo. The Honourable John Farrell's role as Bishop of the Diocese of Hamilton was cut short on September 26, 1873, when at the age of 53 he succumbed to peritonitis. He was laid to rest in a vault beneath his cathedral, St. Mary's Church in Hamilton.
