= John Thomas McNally =

Canadian Catholic prelate (1871–1952)

- Archbishop of Halifax
- Church: Catholic Church
- Archdiocese: Archdiocese of Halifax
- In office: 17 February 1937 – 18 November 1952
- Predecessor: Thomas O’Donnell
- Successor: Joseph Gerald Berry
- Previous posts: Bishop of Hamilton (1924-1937); Bishop of Calgary (1913-1924)

Orders
- Ordination: 4 April 1896
- Consecration: 1 June 1913 by Diomede Falconio

Personal details
- Born: 24 June 1871 Hope River (northwest of New Glasgow), Colony of Prince Edward Island, British Empire
- Died: 18 November 1952 (aged 81)

John Thomas McNally (24 June 1871 – 18 November 1952) was a Canadian Catholic prelate who served as Archbishop of Halifax from 1937 to 1952. He was previously Bishop of Hamilton from 1924 to 1937, and Bishop of Calgary from 1913 to 1924.

== Biography ==
=== Early life and education ===
McNally was of Irish background and born on 24 June 1871 in Hope River, Prince Edward Island. He graduated high school in 1886 and attended Prince of Wales College in Charlottetown. Upon his graduation, he attended the University of Ottawa and graduated in 1892. During his time in Ottawa, he answered the call to priesthood and was sent to Rome to obtain a doctorate in Theology, where he was a classmate of the future Pope Pius XII.

=== Priesthood ===
On 4 April 1896, McNally was ordained in Rome. He then moved to Ottawa to serve as a curate of St Patrick's church, and subsequently to Portland, Oregon in 1900 to serve as secretary to Archbishop Alexander Christie. McNally became a pastor in Chelsea, Quebec (1905) and Almonte, Ontario (1911). He also served as notary at Canada's First Plenary Council in 1909.

=== Bishop of Calgary ===
On 4 April 1913, Pope Pius X appointed him the first Bishop of Calgary. Cardinal Diomede Falconio, OFM—Emeritus Apostolic Delegate to the United States—consecrated McNally a bishop on 1 June of that year; his co-consecrators were the Bishop of Valleyfield, Joseph-Médard Émard, and the Bishop of Dunkeld, Robert Fraser. The Diocese of Calgary was a newly erected diocese lacking structure, seminarians, and financial resources. When McNally arrived in Calgary on 27 July 1913, there were 33 priests serving 30,000 Catholics in the area. The Archbishop of Saint-Boniface—along with his suffragan bishops, who had hoped that the Holy See would select their nominee—was caught off guard and was not pleased by McNally's appointment, and the new bishop also faced significant opposition in his diocese.

=== Bishop of Hamilton ===
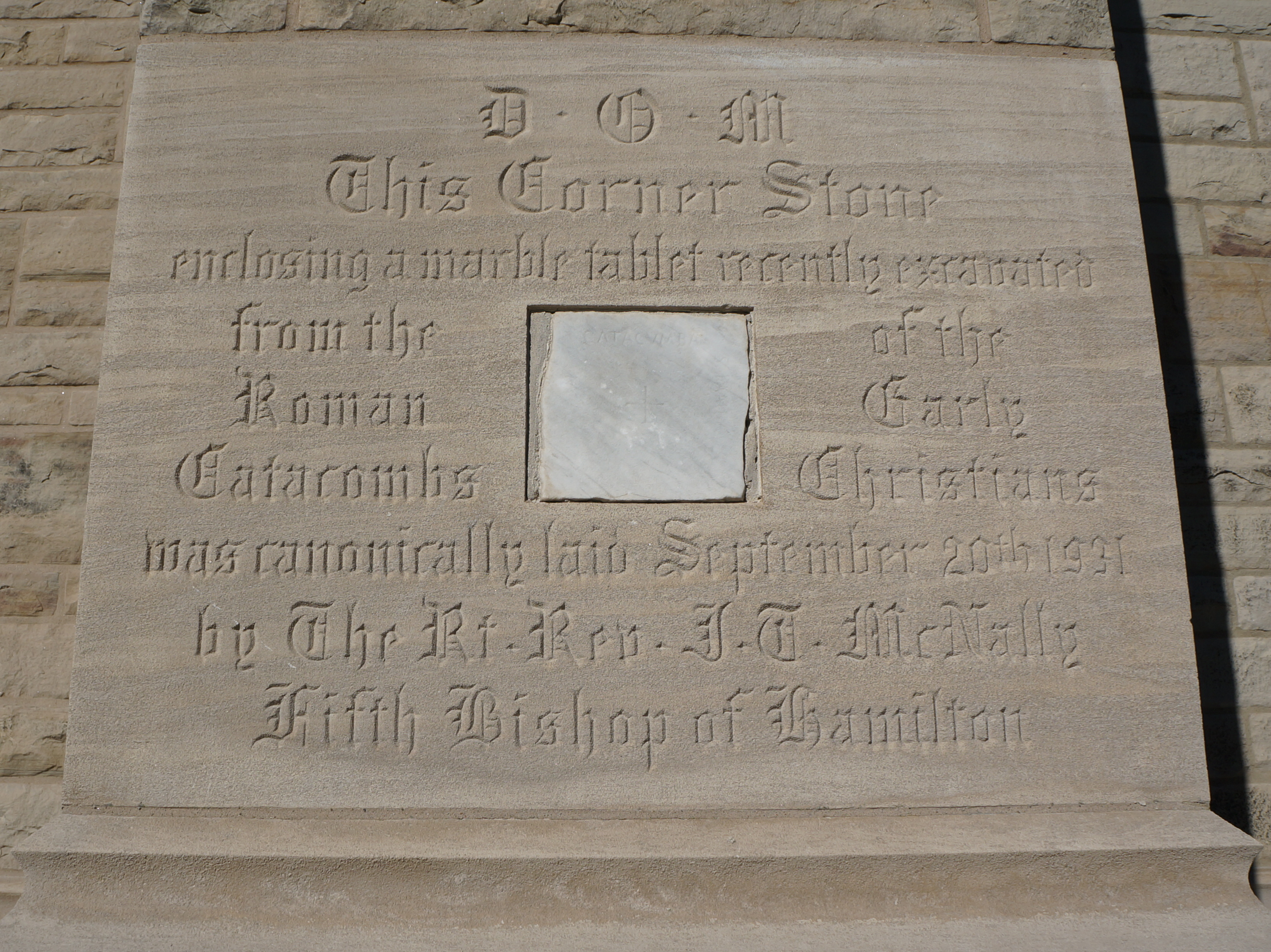
The cornerstone of the Cathedral Basilica of Christ the King was laid on 20 September 1931.

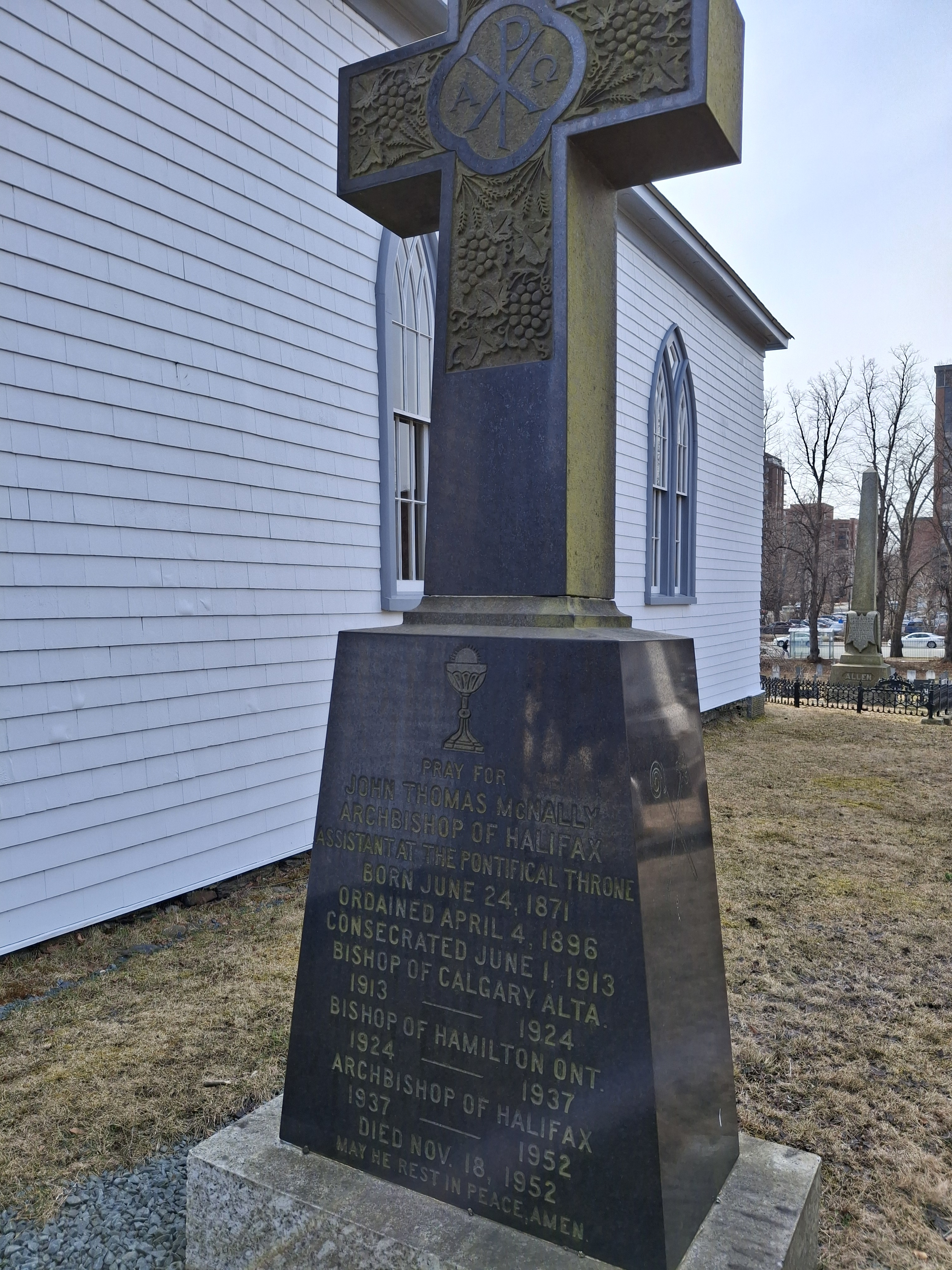
Archbishop McNally's grave at Holy Cross Cemetery in Halifax

Pope Pius XI appointed him Bishop of Hamilton on 12 August 1924, and McNally was installed on November 26th of that year.

One of McNally's bold ventures was the construction of the Cathedral Basilica of Christ the King. The bishop, having already transferred his cathedral church from St. Mary's church to the fifty-year-old St. Patrick's church on King Street East in 1927, recognized the need for a new and prominent cathedral to serve the growing diocese and selected a suitable site that would enhance the splendor of the future cathedral. The venture, made during the Great Depression, drew a storm of protests but McNally remained committed to his plan of building "the finest church in Canada." The cornerstone of the future cathedral was laid on 20 September 1931, and the dedication of the cathedral—"in all its 13th and 14th century English Gothic beauty"— on 19 December 1933 was attended by the Prime Minister of Canada, R. B. Bennett. McNally relied on Bennett's support in obtaining the duty exemptions for the imported marble and stained glass during the construction.

=== Archbishop of Halifax ===
On 17 February 1937, McNally was appointed Archbishop of Halifax. He was installed on his 66th birthday, 24 June 1937. He fought the Town of Dartmouth in court over its attempt to collect local taxes on the Catholic schools' properties. At Saint Mary's University, he replaced the leadership of the Irish Christian Brothers by a Jesuit administration.

== Legacy ==
- Bishop McNally High School
- McNally Building, a major building on the SMU campus

== See also ==
- Catholic Church in Canada

Catholic Church titles
Preceded by Title did not exist prior to 1913	Roman Catholic Bishop of Calgary; 1913–1924	Succeeded by John Thomas Kidd
Preceded by Thomas Joseph Dowling	Roman Catholic Bishop of Hamilton; 1924–1937	Succeeded by Joseph Francis Ryan
Preceded by Thomas O'Donnell	Roman Catholic Archbishop of Halifax; 1937–1952	Succeeded by Joseph Gerald Berry
