= Drâa-El-Gamra =

Archaeological site in Tunisia

Coordinates: 34°48′N 9°25′E

Drâa-El-Gamra is an archaeological site in Tunisia, the site of the ancient city of Gor. It remains a Latin Catholic titular see.

== History ==
In Antiquity the location was known as Gor. It was originally a Punic city. The Roman era civitas, mentioned by Saint Augustine, was located beside the aqueduct to Carthage.

Drâa-El-Gamra was the seat of an ancient episcopal see of the Roman province of Africa Proconsularis.

Only two bishops are historically known. Victor took part in the council held at Carthage in 256 by Saint Cyprian to discuss the question of the lapsi. Restitutus intervened at the Council of Carthage (411).

Like most of the many suffragans of Carthage, it faded.

== Titular see ==
Gor was nominally restored as a Latin titular bishopric in 1933.

It has had the following incumbents, all of the fitting episcopal (lowest) rank:

- Emanuele Hanisch, Mill Hill Missionaries (M.H.M.) (13 April 1937 – 28 February 1940), as first Apostolic Vicar of Umtata (South Africa) (1937.04.13 – death 1940.02.28), promoted as last Apostolic Prefect of Umtata (1930.10.28 – 1937.04.13)
- Eliseu van der Weijer, Carmelites (O. Carm.) (25 May 1940 – death 1966.01.25) as only-ever Bishop-Prelate of Territorial Prelature of Paracatu (Brazil) (1940.05.25 – retired 1962.04.14); previously Apostolic Administrator of above Paracatu (1929 – 1940.05.25)
- Ramón Salas Valdés, Jesuits (S.J.) (5 December 1966 – 17 November 1977) as Bishop-Prelate of Arica (Chile) (1963.10.08 – 1986.08.29); later promoted first Bishop of Arica (1986.08.29 – resigned 1993.05.15), died 1999
- Luiz Colussi (3 January 1978 – 28 March 1980) as Auxiliary Bishop of Londrina (Brazil) (1978.01.03 – 1980.03.28); later Coadjutor Bishop of Lins (Brazil) (1980.03.28 – 1980.10.11), succeeding as Bishop of Lins (Brazil) (1980.10.11 – 1983.12.05), finally Bishop of Caçador (Brazil) (1983.12.05 – death 1996.12.04)
- Paul Consbruch (15 November 1980 – death 2 February 2012) as Auxiliary Bishop of Paderborn (Germany) (15 November 1980 – retired 11 March 1999)
- Daniel Miehm Miehm (20 February 2013 –), Auxiliary Bishop of Hamilton (Canada), no previous prelature

== See also ==
- List of Catholic dioceses in Tunisia

== Sources and external links ==
- GCatholic with incumbent links
