= Bishop Tonnos Catholic Secondary School =

Canadian Catholic secondary school

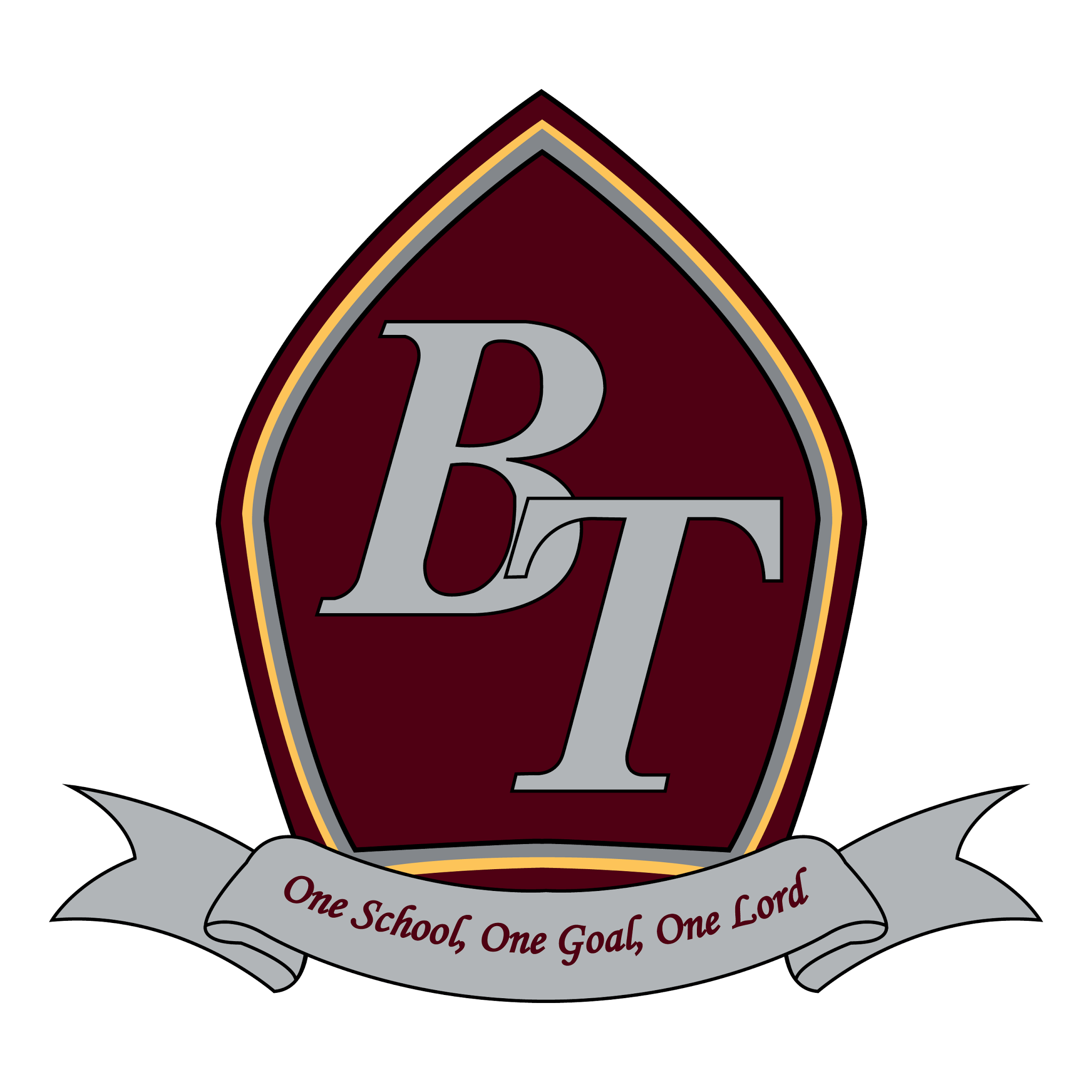

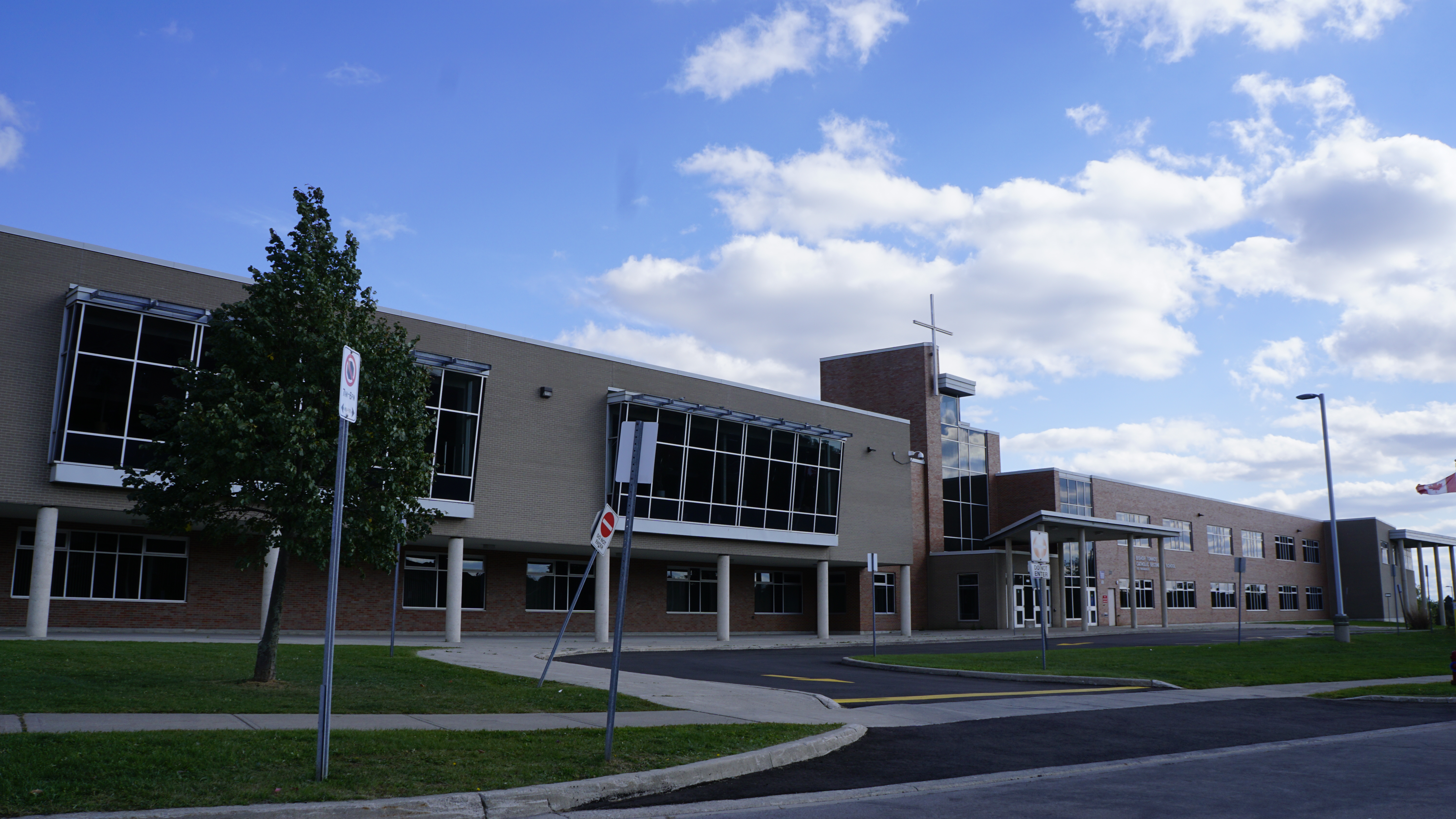

Location
- 100 Panabaker Drive; Ancaster, Ontario, L9G 5E3; Canada; 43.2021°N 79.9951°W

Information
- School type: Public, separate secondary school
- Motto: One School, One Goal, One Lord
- Religious affiliation: Catholic
- Opened: February 17, 2004; 22 years ago
- Founder: Bishop Anthony F. Tonnos
- School board: Hamilton-Wentworth Catholic District School Board
- Superintendent: Toni Kovach
- Area trustee: Phil Homerski
- School number: 689386
- Principal: Tara Boyce
- Chaplain: Tina Fitzgerald
- Grades: 9–12
- Enrolment: ~1,450 (2026)
- Campus size: 17.5 acres (7.1 ha)
- Campus type: Suburban
- Colours: Maroon and silver
- Slogan: Be What? BT!
- Mascot: Tony The Titan
- Team name: Titans
- Alumni: bt.hwcdsb.ca/school/alumni
- Website: Official website

Bishop Tonnos Catholic Secondary School is a Catholic secondary school located in Ancaster, Ontario. It is part of the Hamilton-Wentworth Catholic District School Board and is home to students of eight feeder schools.

== History ==
=== Founding ===
Bishop Tonnos Catholic Secondary School was founded in 2004. In 2002, the Hamilton-Wentworth Catholic District School Board approved the construction of a new secondary school in Ancaster to alleviate overcrowding at St. Thomas More Catholic Secondary School on the West Mountain and St. Mary Catholic Secondary School in West Hamilton.

An official groundbreaking ceremony was held on May 22, 2003, on the grounds of the former 17.5-acre (7.1 ha) Marshall Potato Farm on Highway 53 just west of Fiddler's Green Road.

The school was officially opened in February 2005 and received its official blessing on April 17, 2005, by Bishop Anthony F. Tonnos, after whom the school was named.

=== Construction ===
The 178,000 sq ft (16,500 m^{2}) school was built at a cost of $24-million with a Ministry-rated capacity of 1,250 students. On June 20, 2016, the Board of Trustees approved the installation of a 110,000 sq ft (10,000 m^{2}). artificial turf sports field at the school. A field blessing and dedication, officiated by Bishop Anthony F. Tonnos, was held on October 6, 2017.

=== Charity work ===
Students from Bishop Tonnos went on a mission trip to the Caribbean with Dominican Republic Education and Medical Support, or DREAMS, in 2019. DREAMS is a support program that provides students with a first-hand experience of life and living conditions in the developing South. Students built a two-room house in a mountain village. The schools also host charity events, such as movie-screening fundraisers.

== Feeder schools ==
- Corpus Christi
- Holy Name of Mary
- Immaculate Conception
- Regina Mundi
- St. Ann - Ancaster
- St. Joachim
- St. Teresa of Avila
- St. Thérèse of Lisieux

== Notable alumni ==
- Laura Fortino – women's ice hockey competitor
- Michael Ciccarelli – competitive snowboarder
- Sarah Nurse – women's ice hockey competitor

== See also ==
- Education in Ontario
- List of secondary schools in Ontario
