= Basilica of Our Lady of Perpetual Help (Labrador City) =

Coordinates: 52.9437°N 66.9141°W

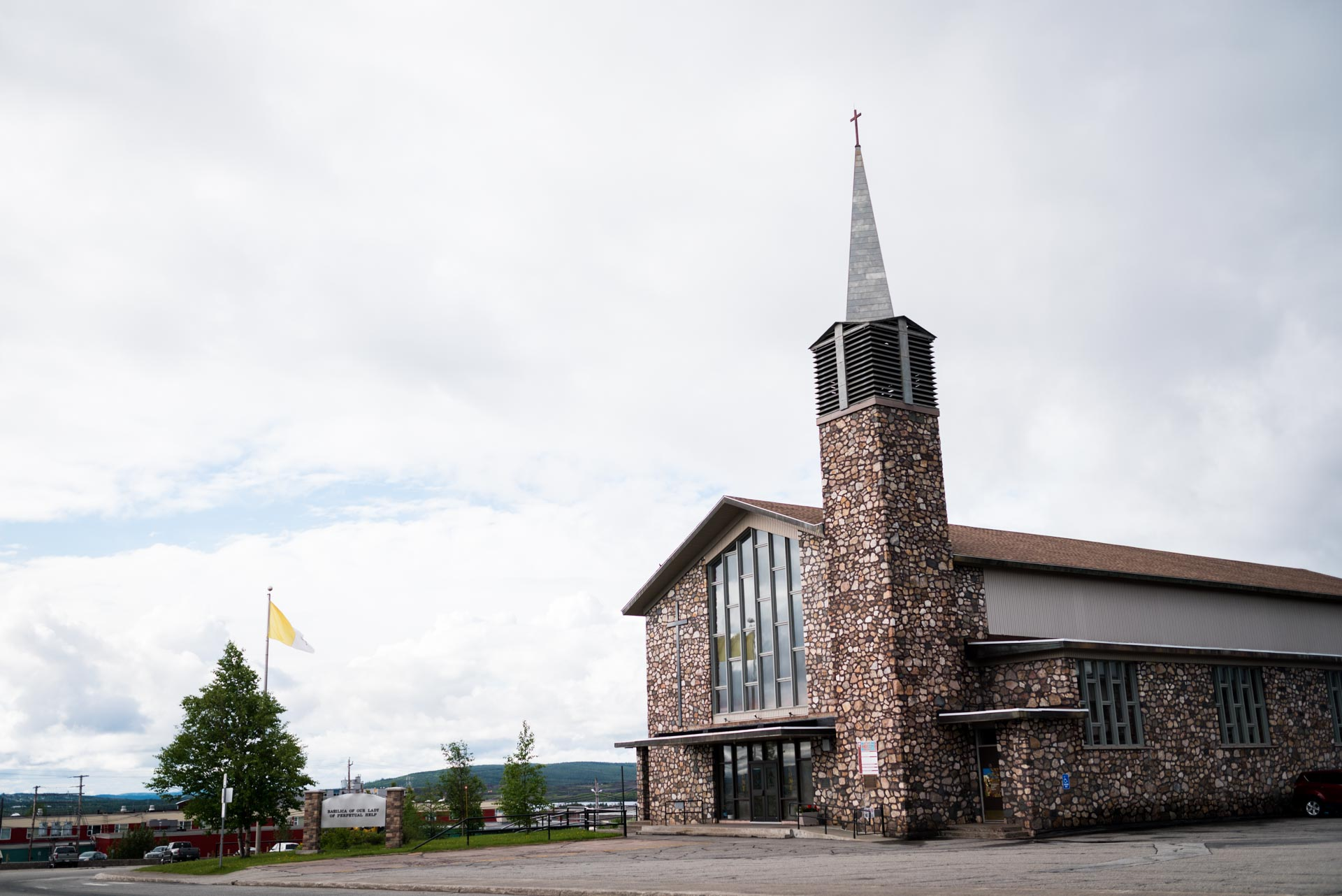
- Basilica of Our Lady of Perpetual Help
- Location: Labrador City, Newfoundland and Labrador
- Country: Canada
- Denomination: Catholic Church

History
- Status: Cathedral

Architecture
- Functional status: Active
- Designated: 1962

The Basilica of Our Lady of Perpetual Help is a Catholic minor basilica and former cathedral dedicated to the Blessed Virgin Mary located in Labrador City, Newfoundland and Labrador, Canada. The basilica is under the circumscription of the Diocese of Corner Brook and Labrador. The church was completed in 1962, and served as the cathedral of the former Diocese of Labrador City–Schefferville. The basilica was decreed on June 1, 2007.

== History ==
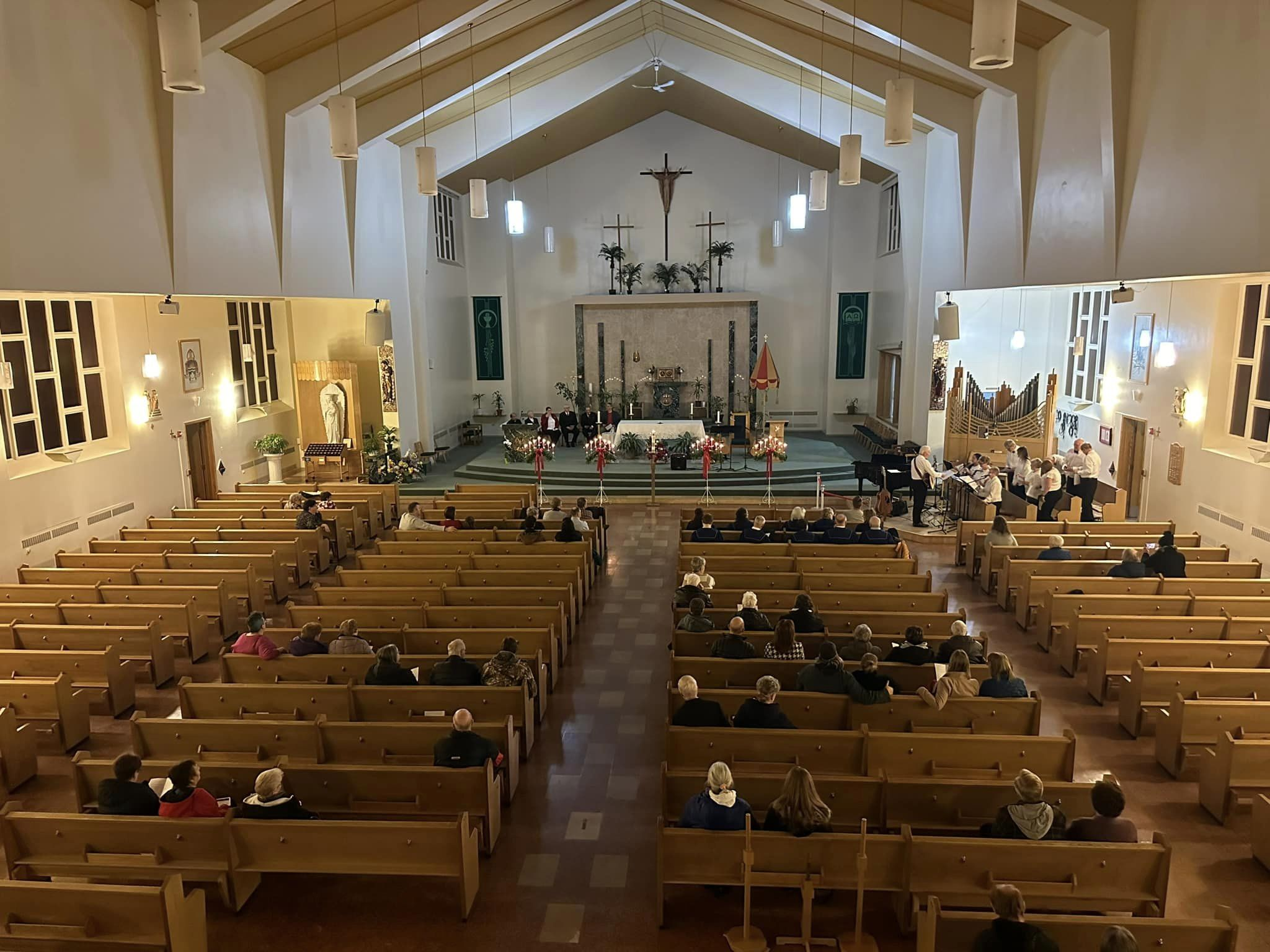
Basilica of our Lady of Perpetual Help in Labrador City

Fr. Jacques Laperriere, OMI, visiting from Schefferville, Quebec, said the first mass at Christmas 1959. It was held in a mine garage. The bishop appointed Fr. Theodore Roussel, OMI, as the first pastor in 1960. He led the drive to build the first church. The church was opened in 1962.

In response to Bishop Peter Sutton, OMI, request, Pope Paul VI decreed in 1976 that the church become a co-cathedral with the one at Schefferville. When mining stopped in Schefferville, the Episcopal see was transferred to Labrador City in 1980, raising the status of Our Lady of Perpetual Help to a cathedral.

In 2007, Pope Benedict XVI decreed that the cathedral was a basilica. It was the second basilica in the province and the twenty-first in Canada.

== Building ==
The basilica is a two-storey postmodern structure with a rock façade and a steeple located next to the front entrance. The tower houses three bells.

== Pastors ==
1. Rev. Theodore Roussel, OMI, 1960 - ?
2. Rev. Jaroslaw Pachocki, OMI, ?-2012
3. Rev Joy Paul Kallikatukudy, OMI, -current
