= Nationa =

Ancient city and bishopric in Roman Africa

Africa Proconsularis.

Nationa was an ancient city and bishopric in Roman Africa, which only remains a Latin Catholic titular see.

== History ==
Nationa, in present Tunisia, was among the many cities in the Roman province of Byzacena, in the papal sway, which became suffragan dioceses of Carthage but faded so completely, plausibly at the 7th century advent of Islam, that no exact site was even identified.

Two of its bishops are historically documented :

- Faustinus, Donatist schismatic without Catholic counterpart at the Council of Carthage in 411, called to discuss the very heresy Donatism with its episcopate and the prevailing Catholics
- Pirasius intervened at the Council of Carthage called in 484 by king Huneric of the Vandal Kingdom, after which he was exiled like most Catholic bishops.

== Titular see ==
The diocese was nominally restored in 1933 as Latin titular bishopric of Nationa (Latin) / Naziona (Curiate Italian) / Nationen(sis) (Latin adjective).

It has had the following incumbents, so far of the fitting episcopal (lowest) rank:

- Alfred Michael Watson (1965.05.17 – 1969.03.17) as Auxiliary Bishop of Diocese of Erie (USA) (1965.05.17 – 1969.03.17); next succeeded as Bishop of Erie (1969.03.17 – retired 1982.07.16), died 1990.
- Francisco F. Claver, (S.J.) (1969.06.18 – 1982.11.15) as last Bishop-Prelate of the then Territorial Prelature of Malaybalay (1969.06.18 – 1982.11.15); next (see) promoted as first Bishop of Malaybalay (1982.11.15 – 1984.09.14), Apostolic Vicar of Bontoc-Lagawe (Philippines) (1995.11.02 – retired 2004.04.15), died 2010
- Anthony Frederick Tonnos (1983.05.13 – 1984.05.02) as Auxiliary Bishop of Roman Catholic Diocese of Hamilton (Canada) (1983.05.13 – 1984.05.02); next succeeded as Bishop of Hamilton (Canada) (1984.05.02 – 2010.09.24)
- Matthew Francis Ustrzycki (1985.05.10 – ...), as Auxiliary Bishop of above Hamilton (Canada) (1985.05.10 – retired 2007.06.01) and on emeritate.

== See also ==
- List of Catholic dioceses in Tunisia
