= Matthew Francis Ustrzycki =

Canadian Catholic bishop

- Auxiliary Bishop of Diocese of Hamilton (emeritus)
- Church: Roman Catholic Church
- See: Diocese of Hamilton
- In office: 1985–2007
- Previous post: Priest

Orders
- Ordination: May 30, 1959
- Consecration: July 3, 1985

Personal details
- Born: March 25, 1932 (age 94) St. Catharines, Ontario, Canada

Matthew Francis Ustrzycki (born March 25, 1932, in St. Catharines) is a Canadian prelate who since 2007 has been the Emeritus Auxiliary Bishop of the Roman Catholic Diocese of Hamilton.

He was ordained a priest on May 30, 1959.

Pope John Paul II appointed him Titular Bishop of Nationa and Auxiliary Bishop of Hamilton on May 10, 1985. The bishop of Hamilton, Bishop Anthony F. Tonnos, gave him the episcopal ordination on July 3 of the same year; co-consecrators were Archbishop Joseph Lawrence Wilhelm of the Archdiocese of Kingston, Ontario, and Bishop John Michael Sherlock , Bishop of the Diocese of London, Ontario.

In 1986, he took up residence at the Church of Our Lady Immaculate in Guelph, fulfilling the desire of the city's founder, John Galt, that a bishop would reside in Guelph.

On June 1, 2007, Pope Benedict XVI accepted Ustrzycki's letter of resignation.
