= Tabae =

Ancient Turkish city

Coordinates: 37°25′58″N 28°50′43″E

Tabae or Tabai (Ancient Greek: Τάβαι) was a city in ancient Caria, although, according to Strabo it was located in a plain in Phrygia on the boundaries of Caria. The place is now Tavas, near Kale, Denizli in Turkey; some inscriptions and numerous ancient remains have been found.

Stephanus Byzantius mentions two cities of this name, one in Lydia (which is conjectured to be Tabala), the other in Caria. Livy says that it was on the frontier of Pisidia towards the coast of the Gulf of Pamphylia. The town in question, however, some coins of which are extant, was one which claimed to have been founded by one Tabus. Others derive its name from tabi, which in Semitic languages means "good", and others from a native word taba, meaning "rock", which seems a probable derivation.

== History ==
In 189 BC, the consul Gnaeus Manlius Vulso, having defeated the inhabitants who blocked his passage, exacted from Tabae a fine of 25 talents and 10,000 medimni of wheat.

== Bishopric ==
Tabae was also the seat of a diocese, a suffragan of Stauropolis.

Three bishops of Tabae are known:

- Rufinus, present at the Council of Ephesus (431);
- Severus, at Constantinople (553);
- Basilius, at Nicæa (787).

The Notitiae Episcopatuum continue to mention the see among the suffragans of Stauropolis until the 13th century.

No longer a residential see, Tabae is included in the Catholic Church's list of titular sees.
