= Anthony F. Tonnos =

Canadian prelate

The Most Reverend Anthony F. Tonnos
- 8th Bishop of Hamilton
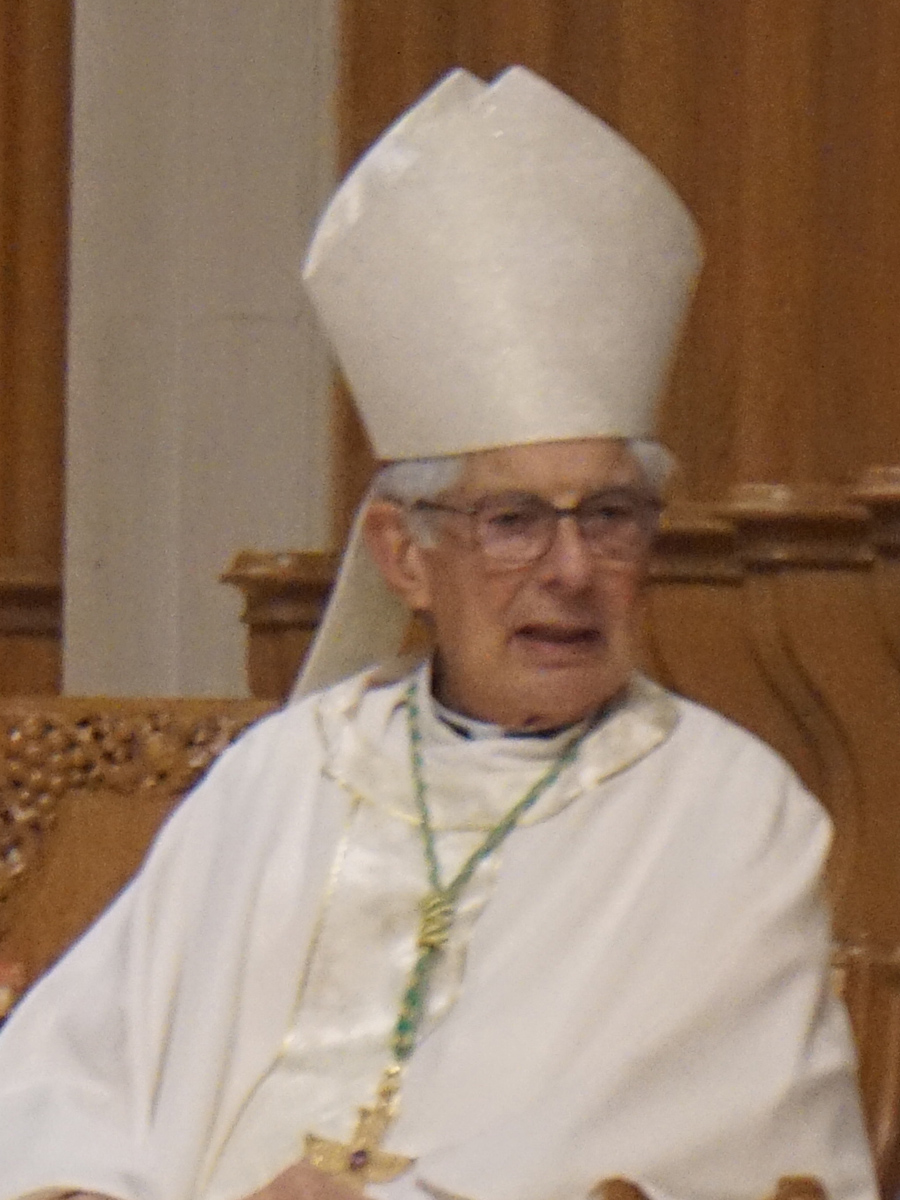
- Bishop Tonnos in 2026
- See: Hamilton
- Installed: July 12, 1983
- Term ended: September 24, 2010
- Predecessor: Paul Francis Reding
- Successor: Douglas Crosby

Personal details
- Born: Anthony Frederick Tonnos; August 1, 1935 (age 91) Port Colborne, Ontario, Canada
- Education: University of Toronto (BA); University of St. Michael's College (STB)
- Coat of arms

Anthony Frederick Tonnos (born August 1, 1935) is a Canadian prelate who currently serves as the Emeritus Bishop of the Roman Catholic Diocese of Hamilton.

== Education ==
Tonnos studied at the University of Toronto, where he received a Bachelor of Arts degree. He then went to study at the University of St. Michael's College where he received a Bachelor of Sacred Theology.

On September 24, 2010, Tonnos had retired. He continues to serve as the Emeritus Bishop of the Roman Catholic Diocese of Hamilton

The Hamilton-Wentworth Catholic District School Board named one of their secondary schools in Ancaster in his honour, Bishop Tonnos Catholic Secondary School.

Styles of Anthony F. Tonnos
- Reference style: Bishop
- Spoken style: Your Grace
- Religious style: The Most Reverend

Catholic Church titles
Preceded by Paul Francis Reding	Roman Catholic Bishop of Hamilton; 1984–2010	Succeeded by David Douglas Crosby
