= Cathedral Basilica of Christ the King =

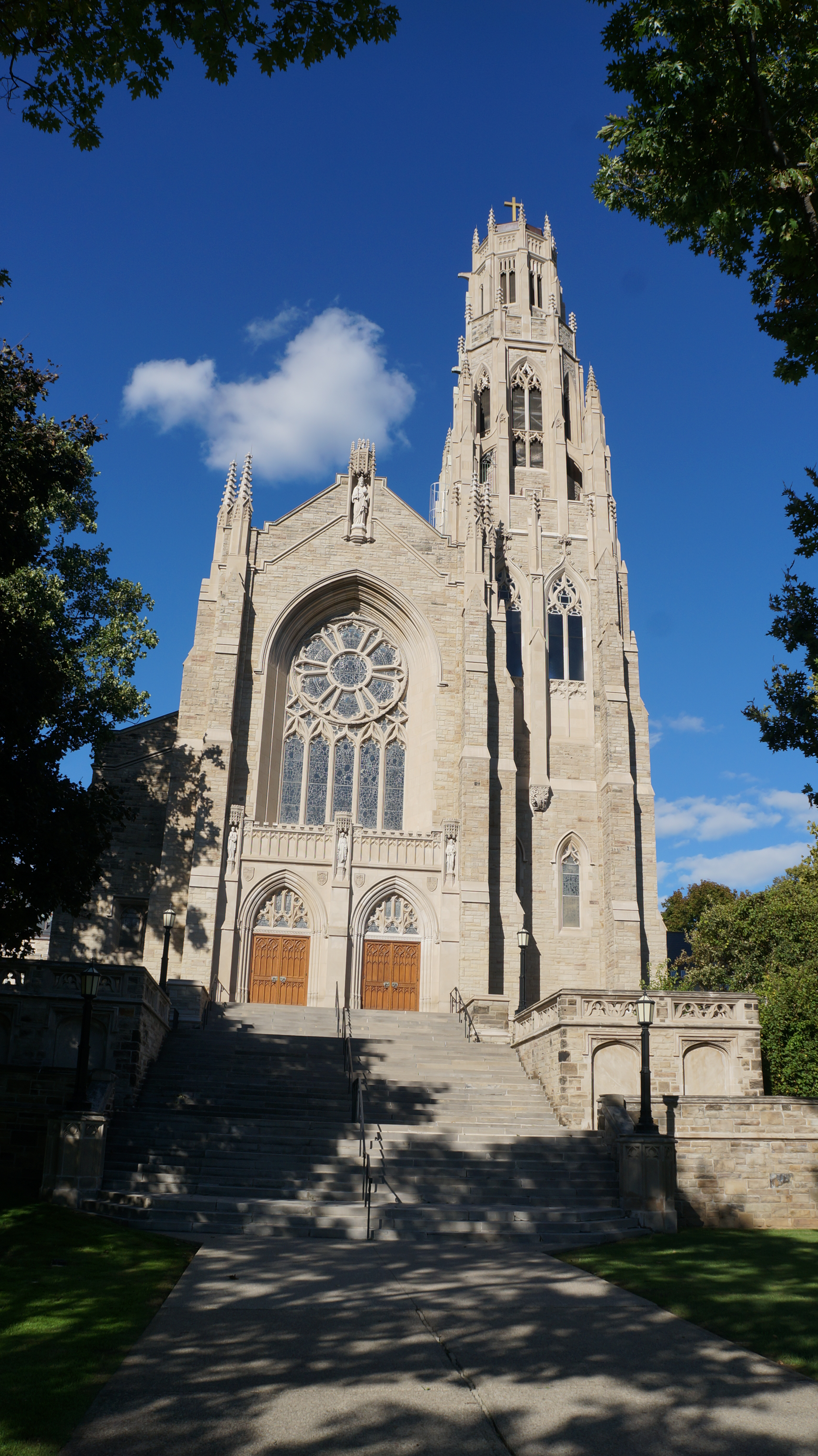
- Entrance on the south side

- Location within Southern Ontario
- 43.26348°N 79.89132°W
- Location: 714 King Street West; Hamilton, Ontario; L8P 1C7
- Denomination: Roman Catholic
- Website: ctkbasilica.ca

History
- Former name: Cathedral of Christ the King
- Status: Cathedral, minor basilica
- Dedication: Christ the King

Administration
- Province: Roman Catholic Archdiocese of Toronto
- Diocese: Hamilton

Clergy
- Bishop: Joseph Dabrowski
- Rector: Father David Walter

The Cathedral Basilica of Christ the King is a Roman Catholic church in Hamilton, Ontario, Canada. The cathedral was consecrated on December 19, 1933. It is the seat of the bishop of the Diocese of Hamilton, and the cathedral of the Diocese of Hamilton. The cathedral contains the cathedra (bishop's chair) of the bishop, the Most Rev. Joseph Dabrwoski. The cathedral was raised to the status of a minor basilica in February 2013 by Pope Benedict XVI.

On the south side of the bell tower is the cornerstone blessed by Bishop McNally, builder of the cathedral and fifth bishop of the diocese. It is a stone excavated from the Roman catacombs to symbolize the cathedral's unity with the ancient Christian church, the first generation after Christ. The cathedral is perched atop a hill overlooking Highway 403. Christ the King Cathedral is close in proximity to the Hamilton-Wentworth Catholic District School Board administration offices, and the offices for the Diocese of Hamilton. The offices for the diocese are located just off to the side of the cathedral, next to the rectory.

== Activities ==
Sunday Masses are usually celebrated by the parish rector, but occasionally, the bishop or guest priests will preside. The cathedral basilica is located atop a hill facing south. The southern "King Street" doors open up to a massive fine stone staircase leading down into the front parking lot. The pure Gothic belltower, containing a carillon of 23 bells, is 165 feet high and visible from a great distance. The largest bell is called the Bourdon Bell, weighs 4 1/2 tons and was donated by Prime Minister of Canada, R. Bennett, a friend of Bishop McNally. At night, the cathedral is illuminated by flood lights and creates an imposing sight, especially from the Hamilton escarpment.

The cathedral basilica is the mother church of the Diocese of Hamilton and is the home of many activities for the Roman Catholic community within the diocese. Parish organizations include the Knights of Columbus, Children's Liturgy, Social Committee, Altar Servers, Cathedral ushers, Catholic Women's League, extraordinary ministers of Holy Communion, the Cathedral Choir which sings at the 11 am Mass, the Tenor-Bass Men's choir which sings at the 9 am Mass and the Cathedral Cantors which lead the singing at the 5-pm Saturday and Sunday afternoon 4-pm Mass. There is also a Parish Pastoral Council and Parish Finance Council to assist the rector and the Pastoral Team in the administration of the parish.

== History ==
Bishop McNally was installed as Bishop of Hamilton on 26 November 1924. Having already transferred his cathedral church from St. Mary's church to the fifty-year-old St. Patrick's church on King Street East in 1927, he recognized the need for a new and prominent cathedral to serve the growing diocese and selected a suitable site that would enhance the splendor of the future cathedral. The venture, made during the Great Depression, drew a storm of protests but McNally remained committed to his plan of building "the finest church in Canada."

William Russell Souter of Hutton & Souter was awarded the distinguished Bemerenti Medal from Pope Pius XI in Rome in 1933 for his design of the building. The cathedral was built by Pigott Construction Company from 1930 to 1933 under Joseph Pigott's leadership, a company founded by Pigott's father and responsible for other Hamilton landmarks including Hamilton City Hall, the Pigott Building, and Copps Coliseum.

The building was damaged in 1981 when an arsonist set fire to the confessionals near the side entrance of the church. The cork tile floor, the main pulpit, a stained glass window, the confessionals, and the side entrance to the cathedral were damaged. Extensive renovations were made to repair and update the church, which now has a new second marble altar cut from the original and various woodwork additions. The stained glass window depicting Mary Magadalene washing the feet of Jesus was rebuilt by F. Meyer according to the original 1930 plan. Two marble side altars were moved 25' back to increase the size of the chancel. A large marble floor in the chancel replaces the original cork floor and carpeting covers the nave.

== Architecture ==
Construction was begun by the Pigott Construction Company of Hamilton in 1930 and completed in 1933. Renovations were carried out in 1981 when it was damaged by a fire earlier that year. One stained glass window was completely rebuilt by the original craftsman, F. Meyer of Munich, Germany. Some of the renovations that were added after the fire are:

- a solid Italian marble floor for the altar containing intricate designs and various colours,
- a new marble altar and presidential chairs including the bishop's cathedra
- the side altars were moved 25 feet north to enlarge the sanctuary area.
- a reconfigured ambo for readers of the scriptures at Mass.
- new lighting and sound system
- air conditioning of the entire cathedral and basement hall
- the chancel organ was removed and later installed 25 feet north of the original position.
- a new four manual organ console [see below]

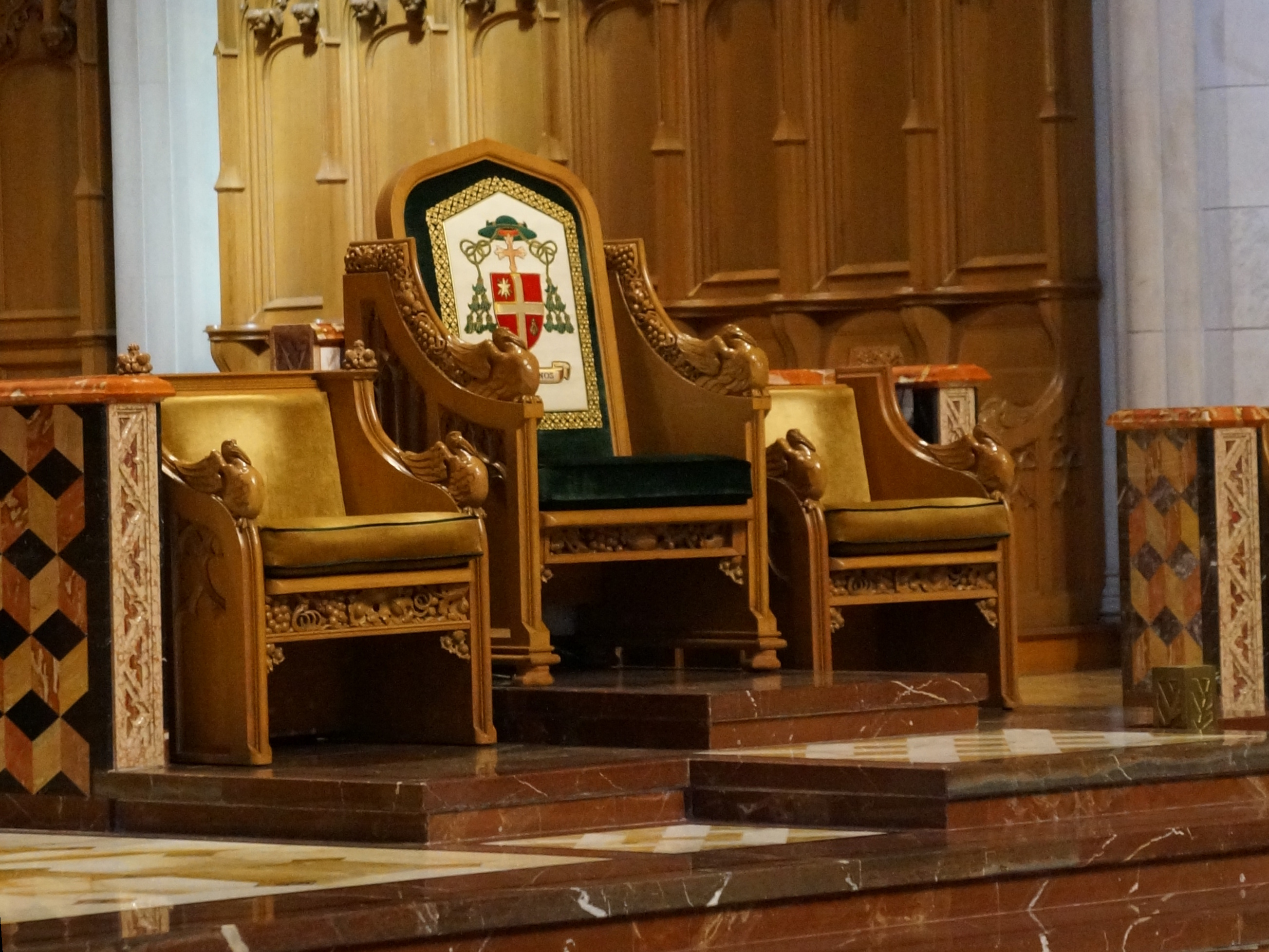
The cathedra of the Bishop of Hamilton atop a marble altar. The altar was added in 1981 during renovations.

The cathedral interior is pure 13th century English Gothic. Two kinds of limestone grace its walls and pillars: Indiana limestone and Ontario Credit Valley limestone. Its vaulted ceiling, with gold bosses, is a direct copy of Norwich Cathedral in England. It also has seating for over 1000 parishioners in the nave and 200 in the sanctuary area, with television flat screens installed on the side Indiana limestone columns for blind spots. The left side altar with its magnificent large painting of Christ's entry into Jerusalem on Palm Sunday, contains the holy oils in three gold urns. The right side altar contains a massive painting of the Nativity Scene and a mosaic of the Eastern Catholic Churches: Our Lady of Perpetual Help. A large 88 ton marble ciborium, sometimes erroneously called a baldachino, in the shape of a crown, the symbol of a royalty and kingship, graces the north end of the cathedral over the tabernacle. Although this is not a normal feature of Gothic architecture, its Gothic design blends in perfectly with the architectural style of the cathedral. The major patriarchal basilicas in Rome, namely, St. Peter's, St. Paul Outside the Walls, St. John Lateran Cathedral and St. Mary Major, all have a ciborium [baldachino] over their altar of sacrifice.

Each of the presidential chairs and sanctuary choir stalls have pelicans carved in solid oak as arm rests. The pelican is an ancient symbol of self-sacrifice and redemption. If the mother pelican cannot find food for its babies, it bites its breast and feeds them with her own blood. This is a symbol of Christ shedding His blood for us, dying on the cross.

The cathedral is home to 82 stained glass windows by F. Meyer of Munich, including depictions from the New Testament, numerous saint depictions at the very top walls of the cathedral in the clerestory, and a grand masterpiece rose window at the very rear above the organ, depicting the Communion of Saints and Christ the King. Some the saints featured in the rose window are: Blessed Virgin Mary, St. Peter, St. Paul, St. Sebastian, St. Rose of Lima, St. Benedict, St. Francis of Assisi, King David, St. Louis of France, St. Matthew and St. Thaddeus. The center bottom panel contains images of Pope Pius XI and Bishop John McNally. The bottom left panel contains an image of Theresa Nuemann, the famous 20th-century German stigmatist who died in 1962. Bishop McNally visited her on one of his visits to Bavaria prior to the cathedral's construction.

The 235-foot central nave is flanked by two side aisles divided by massive Indiana limestone pillars. The nave is 72 feet wide and 90 feet high. The rear narthex of the church contains a solid oak statue of Christ the King.

The choir loft houses a large, four manual Steinmeyer pipe organ built in Ottengen, Bavaria with almost 5,000 pipes. Robert Corso is the organist and director of music at the cathedral basilica. The organ contains 84 ranks of pipes divided with sections in the chancel and gallery. The tone of the organ ranges from a very deep profound bass, with many large wooden pipes, to a very brilliant sound with 14 ranks of mixtures on the Great, [main] manual alone, containing pipes with a high tin content, adding to the overall brilliance of sound. One of the features of the choir manual [bottom keyboard] is a set of pipes made entirely of copper, named Copper Gedect. The large scale facade pipes consisting of the pedal Diapason 16' and the Great manual's Diapason 16' are constructed of zinc. In 1981 the chancel organ was moved further north to allow more space in the sanctuary. In 1990, a new four manual console was added by R. A Denton & Son of Hamilton, built by R.A Colby, Johnson City, Tennessee, temporarily used by the Mormon Tabernacle during their organ console rebuild in the late 1980s. The four manuals are named from top to bottom: Antiphonal/Echo, Swell, Great and Choir. The new console has solid state multiple memory banks for selecting different combinations of stops rapidly. The organ also contains two stops which are tuned sharp and flat to achieve a warm, rich tone. These are a Celeste on the Swell manual and an Unda Maris [wave of the sea] on the choir manual. In April 2016 a new Casavant French terraced four manual console was installed by the Casavant Freres firm of Ste. Hyacinthe, Quebec. The height of the console being quite low, allows the organist to conduct the choirs from the bench while accompanying. To rebuild the organ today in 2016 would most likely cost approximately $5 million Canadian dollars. In 2017 the original console for the chancel organ was rebuilt by Casavant Freres. They also worked to restore the organ itself.

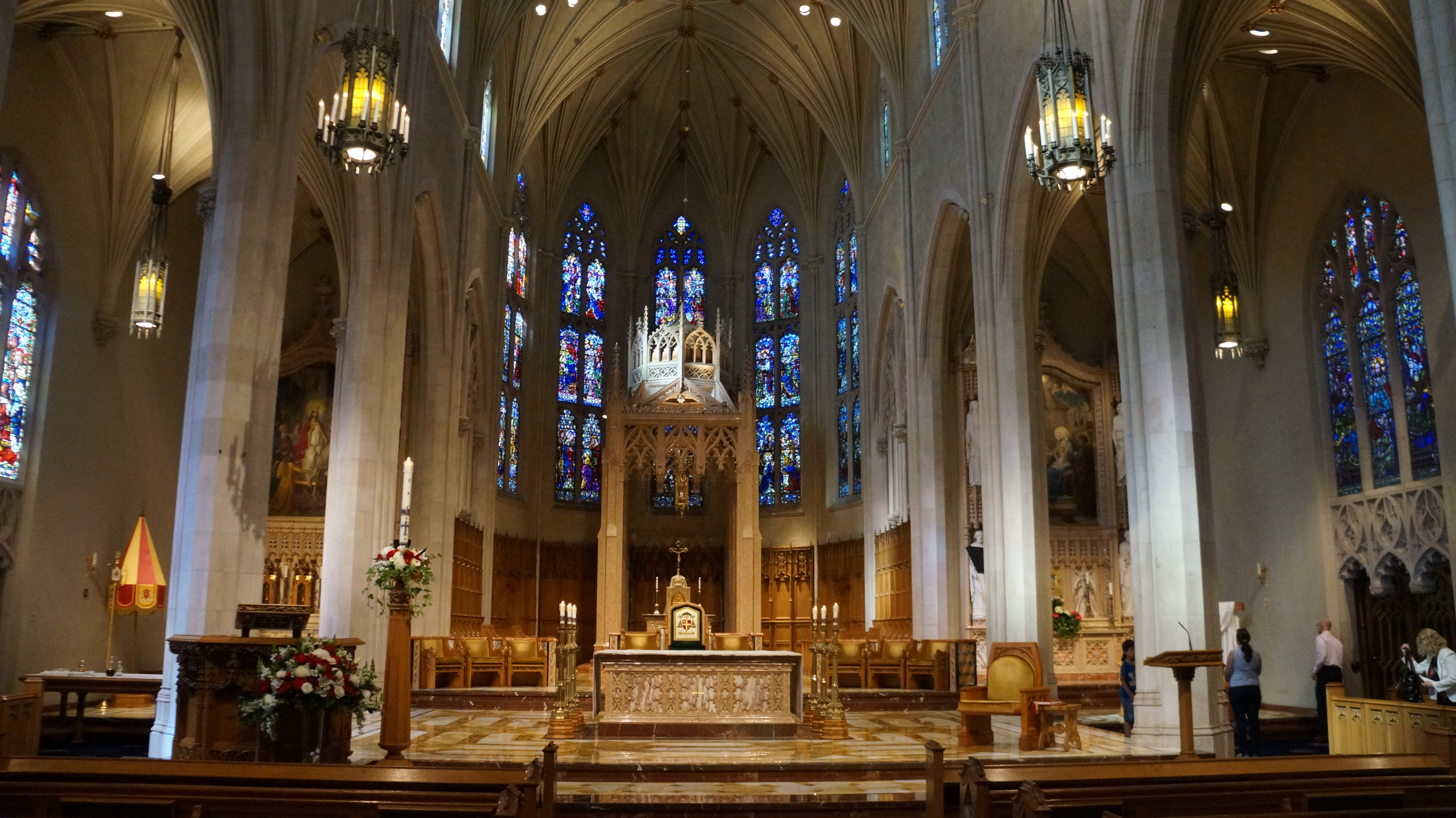
Italian marble built in a trompe-l'œil style is used around the altar.

The cathedral also contains Italian marble constructed in trompe-l'œil style. Its black squares appear to come off the floor adding a depth of perspective. This is reminiscent of the floor in the side aisle of St. John Lateran Cathedral in Rome, Italy. This trompe-l'œil style is used around the floor of the tabernacle, under the ciborium and also on the back of the presidential chairs in the sanctuary. The cathedral also houses 14 stunning 3/4 bas relief Stations of the Cross carved in Italy using Cararra white marble. This is the same marble Michelangelo used to carve the Pieta in St. Peter's Basilica, Rome.

Beneath the main church, as accessed by a side door next to the rectory is McNally Hall, which was renovated in the early 2000s. Named for the fifth Bishop of Hamilton – John Thomas McNally – the builder of the cathedral basilica. The Marian Chapel, used for daily Mass, is located in the basement. A choir rehearsal room, kitchen and washrooms are all located near McNally Hall.

== Gallery ==
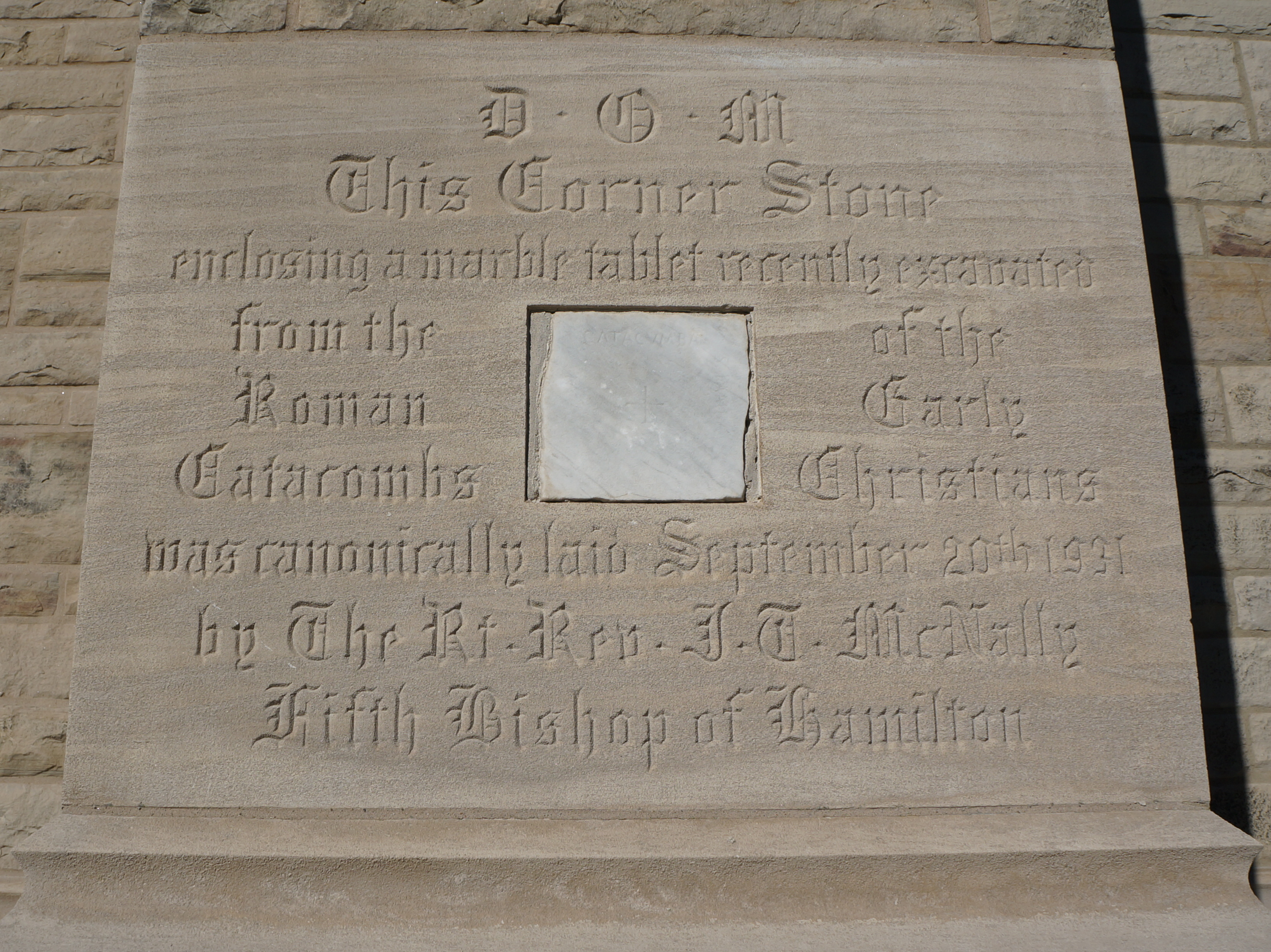
Cornerstone

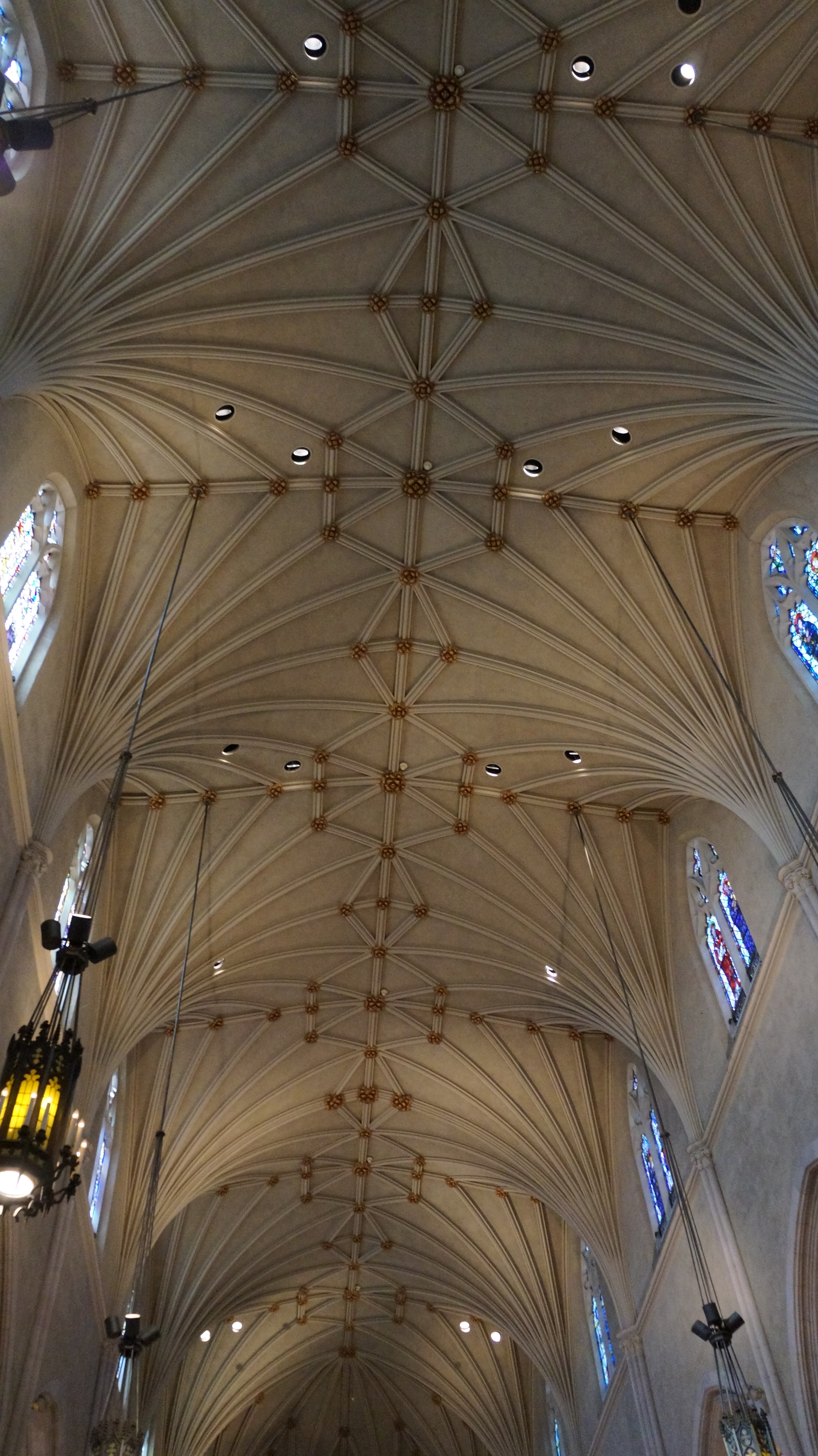
Fan Vaulting

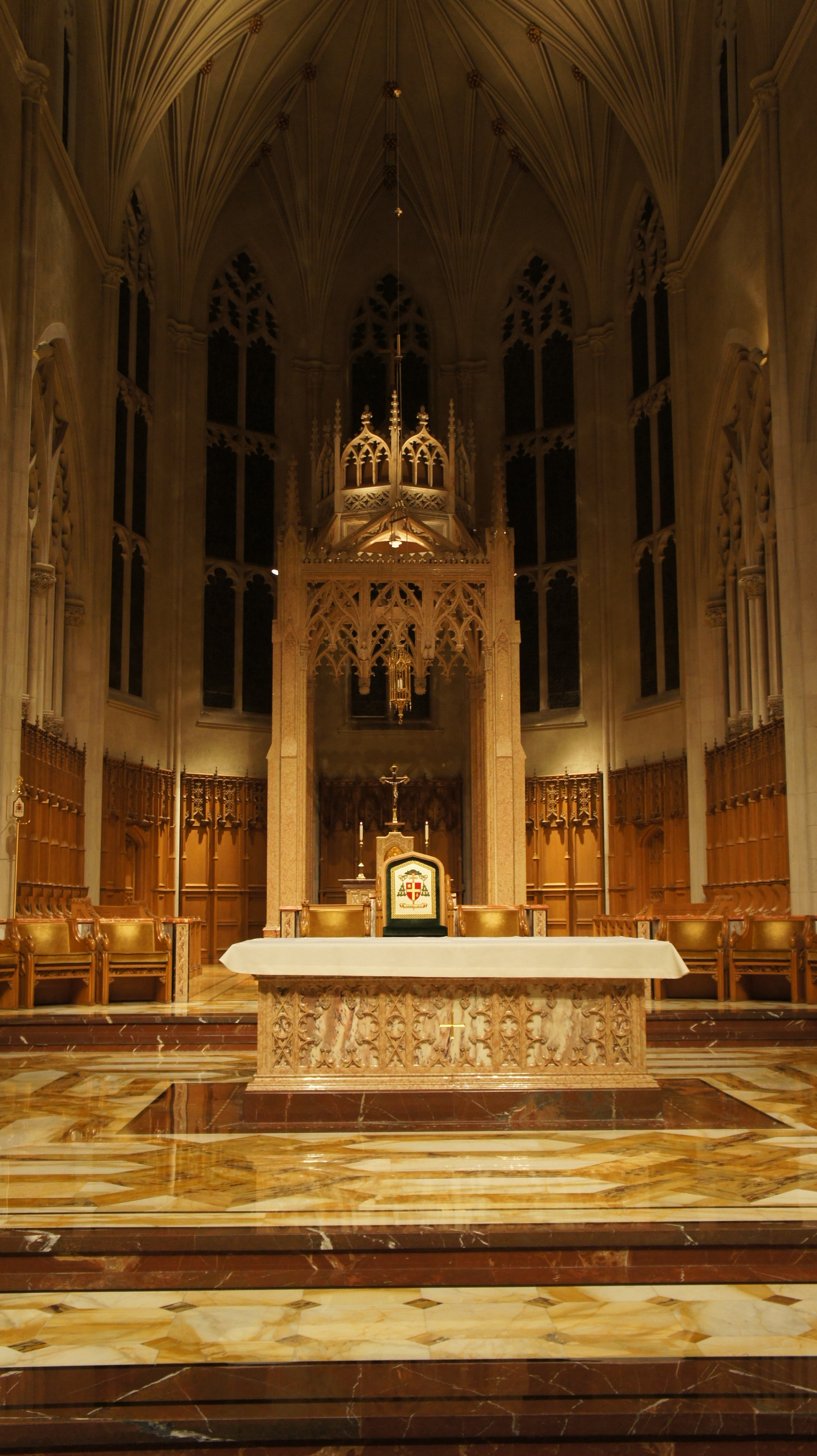
The sanctuary

== See also ==
- List of churches in the Roman Catholic Diocese of Hamilton, Ontario
