= Denis O'Connor (bishop) =

Canadian prelate of the Catholic Church (1841–1911)

The Most Reverend Denis Thomas O'Connor CSB
- Archbishop of Toronto
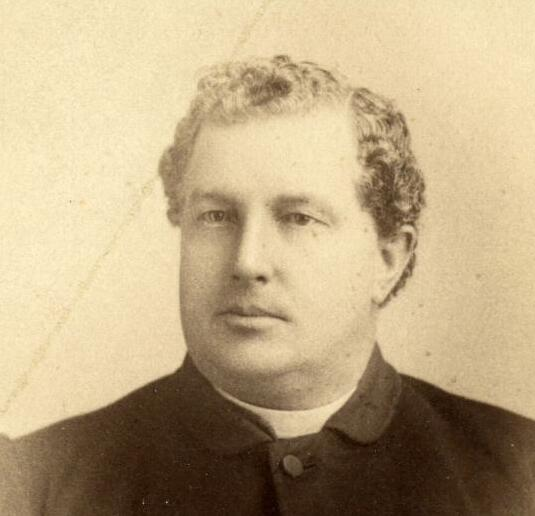
- Church: Catholic
- Archdiocese: Toronto
- Appointed: 7 January 1899
- Retired: 4 May 1908
- Predecessor: John Walsh
- Successor: Fergus McEvay
- Other posts: Titular Archbishop of Laodicea in Syria (1908–1911); Archbishop Emeritus of Toronto (1908–1911)
- Previous post: Bishop of London (1890-1899)

Personal details
- Born: 26 February 1841 Pickering, Ontario, Canada
- Died: 30 June 1911 (aged 70) Toronto, Ontario, Canada
- Buried: Basilian plot, Mount Hope Cemetery, Toronto

Ordination history
History
Priestly ordination
- Ordained by: John Joseph Lynch
- Date: 8 December 1863
Episcopal consecration
- Principal consecrator: John Walsh
- Co-consecrators: John Samuel Foley, Thomas Joseph Dowling
- Date: 19 October 1890
- Place: London, Ontario
Episcopal succession
Bishops consecrated by Denis O'Connor as principal consecrator
- Fergus Patrick McEvay: 1899

Denis Thomas O'Connor CSB (26 February 1841 – 30 June 1911) was a Canadian prelate of the Catholic Church. The first member of the Congregation of St. Basil to become a bishop, he served as Bishop of London (1890-1899) and later as the first Canadian-born Archbishop of Toronto (1899-1908).

== Early life and education ==
O'Connor was born on 26 February 1841 in Pickering, Ontario. He was the eldest of three children of Denis O'Connor and Mary O'Leary, who were Irish immigrants from County Cork. His mother died in 1846 and his father remarried, having ten more children. Five of his sisters would join religious orders.

When the Congregation of St. Basil (also known as the Basilian Fathers) opened St. Michael's College at Toronto in 1852, O'Connor was enrolled as a member of the founding class. After completing his classical and philosophical studies at St. Michael's, he entered the novitiate of the Basilian Fathers in 1859 and made his profession on 24 June 1860. He then went to France to study theology at the Basilian colleges in Feyzin and Annonay.

Failing health due to tuberculosis forced O'Connor to return to Toronto in 1863 and allowed him to be ordained to the priesthood before the canonical age of 25.

== Priesthood ==
At age 22, O'Connor was ordained a priest on 8 December 1863 by Bishop John Joseph Lynch at St. Mary's Church in Toronto. He immediately went on sick leave and was nursed back to health by his stepmother. In 1864 he returned to St. Michael's College, where he served as a professor and became acting administrator in 1868 during the absence of Charles Vincent.

O'Connor helped the Basilian Fathers acquire Assumption College in Windsor, and he was subsequently appointed the college's superior in 1870. During his 20 years at the helm of Assumption, he turned the college around from a state of disrepair by tripling the number of students, expanding the curriculum, and adding two wings to the building. Pope Leo XIII conferred the title of Doctor of Divinity upon O'Connor in 1888.

== Episcopal career ==
=== Bishop of London ===
After Bishop John Walsh was promoted to the Archdiocese of Toronto, Pope Leo appointed O'Connor to succeed him as the third Bishop of London on 18 July 1890. He received his episcopal consecration on the following 19 October from Archbishop Walsh, with Bishops John Samuel Foley and Thomas Joseph Dowling serving as co-consecrators, at St. Peter's Cathedral in London.

O'Connor was the first Basilian priest to become a bishop, although he unsuccessfully sought to decline the appointment. He avoided significant expansion of the Diocese of London during his tenure, having inherited debt from the construction of St. Peter's Cathedral and overseeing a decline in the local Catholic population from 70,000 in 1890 to 60,000 in 1899. One notable exception was the establishment of St. Joseph's Hospital in London.

=== Archbishop of Toronto ===
Following the death of Archbishop Walsh, O'Connor was once again called to succeed him and was appointed the third Archbishop of Toronto on 7 January 1899. He was the first Canadian-born Archbishop of Toronto and the first Canadian-born head of the diocese since Michael Power, who served as bishop from 1841 to 1847. He took formal charge of the archdiocese on 3 May 1899, when he was installed at St. Michael's Cathedral in Toronto.

With his academic background, O'Connor made a strong push for the certification of separate school teachers and tried to guarantee an equal education for Catholic children. However, gaining a reputation as a "rigid disciplinarian," O'Connor had a poor relationship with the clergy and laity of the archdiocese. He was strongly opposed to interfaith marriage and required his personal approval for any such marriage, even doubling the fees for the weddings. He also prohibited women from serving in church choirs, applied a strict implementation of Pope Pius X's Tra le sollecitudini that discouraged more modern liturgical music, banned parishes from holding picnics, and refused to allow the Knights of Columbus to expand into the archdiocese on the grounds that there were already too many Catholic societies.

== Later life and death ==
O'Connor submitted his resignation as Archbishop of Toronto in April 1908, and it was accepted by the pope on 4 May 1908. At the same time, he was given the honorary tile of Titular Archbishop of Laodicea in Syria. He was succeeded by Fergus McEvay, who had also succeeded him as Bishop of London.

O’Connor spent his retirement at the Basilian novitiate in Toronto. He died there from complications with Bright's disease and diabetes on 30 June 1911, at age 70. He is buried in Mount Hope Catholic Cemetery. Archbishop Denis O'Connor Catholic High School in Ajax is named for him.

Religious titles
Preceded by John Walsh	Archbishop of Toronto; 1899–1908	Succeeded by Fergus Patrick McEvay
Preceded by John Walsh	Bishop of London; 1890–1899	Succeeded by Fergus Patrick McEvay
