= John Patrick Comiskey =

21st-century Canadian Catholic priest and writer

Reverend John Patrick Comiskey
- Pastor of Mary Immaculate Parish
- Diocese: Diocese of London
- Other posts: Assistant Professor of Historical Theology, St. Peter's Seminary
- Previous post: Vice-Rector of St. Peter's Seminary

Orders
- Ordination: by John Michael Sherlock

Personal details
- Born: Ontario, Canada
- Denomination: Roman Catholic
- Education: Pontificia Università Gregoriana; St. Peter's Seminary, Western University

John Patrick Comiskey is a Canadian Roman Catholic priest and author in the Diocese of London. Comiskey is Moderator of the Curia and Bishop's Delegate, and assistant professor of historical theology and a former Vice-Rector at St. Peter's Seminary. The job of the bishop's delegate is to reach settlements with victims of clergy abuse on behalf of the diocese.

Comiskey studied at St. Peter's Seminary before being ordained to the priesthood at St. Peter's Cathedral Basilica in London, Ontario by Bishop John Michael Sherlock.

== Education ==
- HED, Historiae Ecclesiasticae (Doctor of Church History) Doctor, Pontifical Gregorian University, Rome
- HEL, Historiae Ecclesiasticae Licentiate, Pontifical Gregorian University, Rome
- M.Div., Master of Divinity, The University of Western Ontario
- BA, Bachelor of Arts, The University of Western Ontario

== Publications ==
=== Books ===
- Comiskey, John P. (31 July 2012). My Heart's Best Wishes for You: A Biography of Archbishop John Walsh. McGill-Queen's University Press. ISBN 978-0773540132.

=== Articles ===
- Comiskey, John P. (January 2007). "Michael Power:The Struggle to Build the Catholic Church on the Canadian Frontier (review)". The Catholic Historical Review. 93 (1): 214–215. doi:10.1353/cat.2007.0075. S2CID 162233645.
- Comiskey, John P. (January 2007). "Eternal Memory! Father Achiel Delaere (1868-1939): The First Eastern Rite Redemptorist and Canada's Ukrainian Catholic Church (review)". The Catholic Historical Review. 93 (1): 216–217. doi:10.1353/cat.2007.0076. S2CID 161594005.
- Comiskey, John P. (October 2006). "Dictionnaire biographique des évêques catholiques du Canada: Les diocèses catholiques canadiens des Églises latine et orientales et leurs évêques; repères chronologiques et biographiques, 1658–2002 (review)". The Catholic Historical Review. 92 (4): 704–705. doi:10.1353/cat.2007.0008. S2CID 161176897.
- Comiskey, John P. (January 2002). "The Waning of the Green: Catholics, the Irish, and Identity in Toronto, 1887–1922 (review)". The Catholic Historical Review. 88 (1): 163–164. doi:10.1353/cat.2002.0012. S2CID 162212571.
