= Assembly of Catholic Bishops of Ontario =

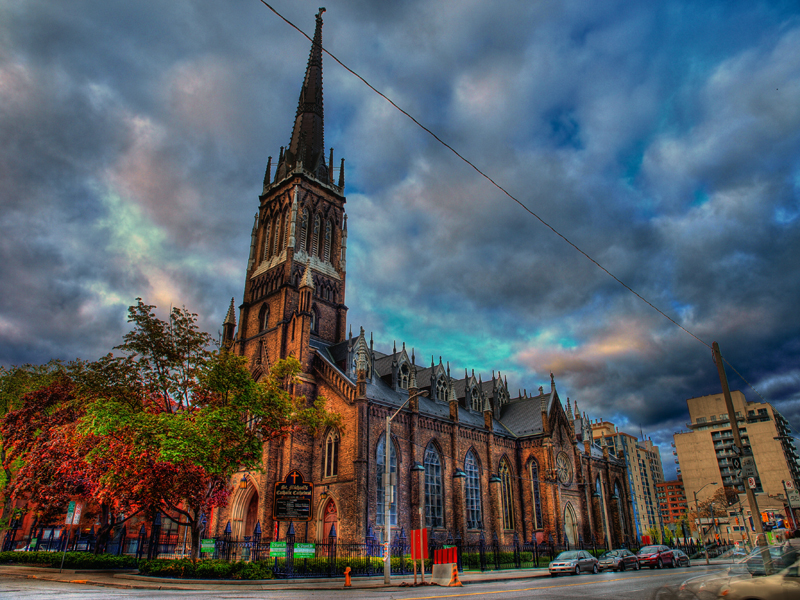
- St. Michael's Cathedral Basilica in Toronto
- Type: Regional episcopal assembly
- Headquarters: Toronto
- Location: Ontario, Canada
- Members: 23 bishops (2021)
- Official language: English and French
- Affiliations: Canadian Conference of Catholic Bishops
- Website: www.acbo.on.ca

The Assembly of Catholic Bishops of Ontario (ACBO) (Assemblée des évêques catholiques de l'Ontario in French) is the association of Catholic bishops in the Province of Ontario, Canada. It is involved in providing information about the moral positions of the Catholic Church in all aspects of public life. It works alongside the Canadian Conference of Catholic Bishops on a regional level, while other bishops' assemblies do similar work in other parts of Canada.

== Members ==
The Assembly of Catholic Bishops of Ontario includes the bishops of 12 dioceses and 4 eparchies as well as the bishop of the Military Ordinariate of Canada, who is a member of all four regional episcopal assemblies in Canada. In 2021 its president is Ronald Peter Fabbro, bishop of London.

The ACBO includes the bishops of the following Catholic jurisdictions:

- Diocese of Hamilton
- Diocese of Hearst–Moosonee
- Archdiocese of Kingston
- Diocese of London
- Archdiocese of Ottawa–Cornwall
- Diocese of Pembroke
- Diocese of Sault Ste Marie
- Diocese of Peterborough
- Diocese of Saint Catharines
- Diocese of Thunder Bay
- Diocese of Timmins
- Archdiocese of Toronto
- Chaldean Catholic Eparchy of Mar Addai of Toronto
- Slovak Catholic Eparchy of Saints Cyril and Methodius of Toronto
- Syro-Malabar Catholic Eparchy of Mississauga
- Ukrainian Catholic Eparchy of Toronto
- Military Ordinariate of Canada
