= John Comiskey =

John Comiskey may refer to:

- John Comiskey (politician), American politician in Chicago, Illinois
- John Comiskey (Canadian football), former Canadian football player
- John Patrick Comiskey, Canadian Roman Catholic priest and author
