= List of churches in the Diocese of London, Ontario =

Names and information on churches in the Diocese of London, Ontario

This is a list of current and former Catholic churches in the Diocese of London, Ontario. The diocese includes 115 churches in Southwestern Ontario divided into six administrative regions called deaneries. The cathedral church of the diocese is St. Peter's Cathedral Basilica in London, Ontario.

== Huron Perth Deanery ==
Name	Images	Location	Established	Description/notes
St. Ambrose		17 Flora St., Brussels		Mission of Sacred Heart, Wingham. First church built in 1876, second church built in 1993.
St. Patrick		81 Mill St, Dublin	1900	Member of the Perth Huron Crossroads Catholic Family of Parishes.
Precious Blood		200 Sanders St West, Exeter		Member of the Lake Huron Catholic Family of Parishes.
St. Peter		156 North St, Goderich	1834	Member of the Lake Huron Catholic Family of Parishes.
Immaculate Heart of Mary		337 Ontario St, Grand Bend	1982	Member of the Lake Huron Catholic Family of Parishes.
St. Patrick		4597 Road 145, R.R. 1, Kinkora	1862	Member of the Perth Huron Crossroads Catholic Family of Parishes. The church was designed by Joseph Connolly.
St. Joseph		1025 Wallace Ave North, Listowel		Clustered with Sacred Heart
St. Vincent de Paul		29 Park Lane, Mitchell		Member of the Perth Huron Crossroads Catholic Family of Parishes.
Our Lady of Mount Carmel		Mount Carmel	1860	Member of the Lake Huron Catholic Family of Parishes.
St. James		22 Victoria St, Seaforth	1880	Member of the Perth Huron Crossroads Catholic Family of Parishes.
St. Peter		St. Joseph	1854	Member of the Lake Huron Catholic Family of Parishes.
Holy Name of Mary		St. Marys	1865	Member of the Avon-Thames Catholic Family of Parishes.
St. Joseph		99 Huron St, Stratford	1837	Member of the Avon-Thames Catholic Family of Parishes.
Sacred Heart		220 Carling Terrace, Wingham	1847	Clustered with St. Joseph
St. Boniface		22 Mary St, Zurich	1896	Member of the Lake Huron Catholic Family of Parishes.

== Ingersoll Deanery ==
Name	Images	Location	Established	Description/notes
Our Lady, Queen of the Martyrs		110 Adams Ave, Delhi	1935	Member of the Catholic Family of Parishes in Norfolk; Formerly called St. John de Brebeuf and Companions Church 1956-2007
Sacred Heart		131 Thames St North, Ingersoll	1838	Member of the North Oxford Catholic Family of Parishes.
Sacred Heart		24 Albert St, Langton	1936	Member of the Erie Tri-County Catholic Family of Parishes.
St. Cecilia		17 Lynn Park Ave, Port Dover	1945	Member of the Catholic Family of Parishes in Norfolk
St. Mary		211 Union St, Simcoe	1886	Member of the Catholic Family of Parishes in Norfolk
St. Mary		51 Venison St West, Tilsonburg	1875	Member of the Erie Tri-County Catholic Family of Parishes.
St. Michael		978 John's Rd, Walsh		Member of the Erie Tri-County Catholic Family of Parishes.
St. Bernard of Clairvaux		165 Thompson Rd, Waterford	1951	Member of the Catholic Family of Parishes in Norfolk
Holy Cross Polish Catholic Community		169 Ingersoll Rd, Woodstock	1986	Member of the North Oxford Catholic Family of Parishes.
Holy Trinity		1420 Devonshire Ave, Woodstock	2006	Member of the North Oxford Catholic Family of Parishes.

== Kent Deanery ==
Name	Images	Location	Established	Description/notes
St. Mary		95 Marlborough St North, Blenheim	1927	Member of the South Kent Catholic Family of Parishes in Essex
Blessed Sacrament		145 Victoria Ave, Chatham	1921	Member of the Chatham Catholic Family of Parishes
Our Lady of Victory Polish Catholic Community		490 St. Clair St, Chatham		Member of the Chatham Catholic Family of Parishes
St. Joseph		180 Wellington St West, Chatham	1850	Member of the Chatham Catholic Family of Parishes; Church designed by Joseph Connolly, construction completed in 1887.
St. Ursula		205 Tweedsmuir Ave West, Chatham	1951	Member of the Chatham Catholic Family of Parishes
St. Michael		698 Tecumseh St, Dresden	1872	Member of the Kent Lambton Roman Catholic Family of Parishes
Paroisse Immaculée Conception & Saint-Philippe Parish		24152 Winterline Rd, Pain Court	1853	Member of the Lakes Erie and St. Clair Catholic Family of Parishes/Famille catholique des paroisses des lacs Érié et Ste-Claire.
Sacred Heart		464 John St, Port Lambton	1880	Member of the Kent Lambton Roman Catholic Family of Parishes
St. Michael		26 George St, Ridgetown	1881	Member of the South Kent Catholic Family of Parishes in Essex
St. Paul		9 Alice St, Thamesville	1861	Member of the South Kent Catholic Family of Parishes in Essex
St. Francis Xavier		32 Canal St West, Tilbury	1855	Member of the Lakes Erie and St. Clair Catholic Family of Parishes/Famille catholique des paroisses des lacs Érié et Ste-Claire.
St. Peter		5425 Tecumseh Line, Tilbury	1802	Member of the Lakes Erie and St. Clair Catholic Family of Parishes/Famille catholique des paroisses des lacs Érié et Ste-Claire.
Holy Family		647 Murray St, Wallaceburg	1949	Member of the Kent Lambton Roman Catholic Family of Parishes
Our Lady Help of Christians		422 Elgin St, Wallaceburg	1878	Member of the Kent Lambton Roman Catholic Family of Parishes

== London Deanery ==
Name	Images	Location	Established	Description/notes'
Our Lady of Sorrows		116 John St South, Aylmer	1939	Member of the Elgin Roman Catholic Family of Parishes.
St. Charles Garnier		244 Stella Ave, Glencoe	1962	Member of the West Middlesex Catholic Family of Parishes.
Christ the King University		266 Epworth Ave, London	2005	Worships at 'The Chapel’ at Windermere on the Mount in London.
Communaute Catholique Ste-Marguerite d'Youville		920 Huron St, London	1982	Worships at St. Andrew The Apostle Church, London. Member of the Fanshawe-Thames Catholic Family of Parishes.
Holy Cross		10 Elm St, London	1950	Member of the Fanshawe-Thames Catholic Family of Parishes.
Holy Family		777 Valetta St, London	2006	Member of Lucan Northwest London Catholic Family of Parishes.
Mary Immaculate		1980 Trafalgar St, London	1965	Member of the Fanshawe-Thames Catholic Family of Parishes.
Our Lady of Czestochowa		419 Hill St, London	1953	Member of the London East Central Catholic Family of Parishes.
Our Lady of the Holy Rosary Vietnamese Catholic Community		London		Worships at St. Andrew The Apostle Church, London. Member of the Fanshawe-Thames Catholic Family of Parishes.
Our Lady of Siluva Lithuanian Catholic Community		London	1964	Worships at Mary Immaculate Church, London. Member of the Fanshawe-Thames Catholic Family of Parishes.
St. Andrew the Apostle		1 Fallons Lane, London	1965	Member of the Fanshawe-Thames Catholic Family of Parishes.
St. Andrew Kim Korean Catholic Community		258 Clarke Rd, London		Member of the Fanshawe-Thames Catholic Family of Parishes.
St. Francis of Assisi-St. Martin of Tours		46 Cathcart St, London		Member of the London South Catholic Family of Parishes.
St. George		1164 Commissioners Rd West, London	1955	Member of the Springbank Catholic Family of Parishes.
St. John the Divine		390 Base Line Rd West, London	1965	Member of the Springbank Catholic Family of Parishes.
St. Josephine Bakhita African-Caribbean Catholic Community		London		Worships at St. Michael Church, London. Member of the London North Central Catholic Family of Parishes.
St. Justin Martyr		855 Jalna Blvd, London	1977	Member of the London South Catholic Family of Parishes.
St. Leopold Mandic		2889 Westminster Dr, London	1980	Member of the London South Catholic Family of Parishes.
St. Mary		345 Lyle St, London	1872	Member of the London East Central Catholic Family of Parishes.
St. Michael		511 Cheapside St, London	1911	Member of the London North Central Catholic Family of Parishes.
St. Patrick		377 Oakland Ave, London	1913	Member of the London East Central Catholic Family of Parishes. Designed by Barry Byrne, and built in 1952.
St. Peter's Cathedral Basilica		196 Dufferin Ave, London	1843	Member of the London North Central Catholic Family of Parishes. Parish established 1834; French French Gothic Revival style built 1880-1885
St. Stephen of Hungary Hungarian Catholic Community		Worships at St. Patrick, London.	1964	Member of the London East Central Catholic Family of Parishes.
St. Patrick		R.R. 3, 32922 Richmond St, Lucan	1845	Member of Lucan Northwest London Catholic Family of Parishes.
Sacred Heart		159 Ann St, Parkhill	1869	Member of the West Middlesex Catholic Family of Parishes.
Holy Angels		502 Talbot St, St. Thomas	1831	Member of the Elgin Roman Catholic Family of Parishes.
St Anne		20 Morrison Dr, St. Thomas	1967	Member of the Elgin Roman Catholic Family of Parishes.
Tridentine Latin Mass Community				Worships at Holy Angels Church, St. Thomas.
All Saints		125 Front St East, Strathroy	1869	Member of the West Middlesex Catholic Family of Parishes.
St. Helen		29519 Talbot Line, Wallacetown		Member of the Elgin Roman Catholic Family of Parishes.
St. Mary		128 Main St, West Lorne	1885	Member of the Elgin Roman Catholic Family of Parishes.

== Sarnia Deanery ==
Name	Images	Location	Established	Description/notes'
St. Michael		1920 Wildwood Dr, Brights Grove	1986	Member of the Sarnia Bluewater Roman Catholic Family of Parishes.
St. Joseph		346 1 Beresford St, Corunna	1854	Member of the Lambton County Catholic Family of Parishes.
St. Christopher		68 Union St, Forest	1857	Member of the Lambton County Catholic Family of Parishes. First church built 1866; second church built 1893; new church built in 2002
St. Philip		415 King St, Petrolia	1867	Member of the Lambton County Catholic Family of Parishes.
Our Lady of Mercy		390 N Christina St, Sarnia	1856	Member of the Sarnia Bluewater Roman Catholic Family of Parishes.
Paroisse St-Thomas D'Aquin		895 Rue Champlain, Sarnia	1944	Member of the Sarnia Bluewater Roman Catholic Family of Parishes.
Queen of Peace		566 Rosedale Ave, Sarnia	1958	Member of the Sarnia Bluewater Roman Catholic Family of Parishes.
Sacred Heart		1465 Lecaron Ave, Sarnia	1949	Member of the Sarnia Bluewater Roman Catholic Family of Parishes.
St. Benedict		1011 Oak Ave, Sarnia	1959	Member of the Sarnia Bluewater Roman Catholic Family of Parishes.
St. Joseph		291 Stuart St, Sarnia	1923	Member of the Sarnia Bluewater Roman Catholic Family of Parishes.
Our Lady Help of Christians		432 Victoria St, Watford	1875	Member of the Lambton County Catholic Family of Parishes.

== Windsor-Essex Deanery ==
Name	Images	Location	Established	Description/notes'
St. John the Baptist		225 Brock St, Amherstburg	1827	Member of the Amherstburg-Harrow Catholic Family of Parishes
St. Simon and St. Jude		488 St. Charles St, Belle River	1842	Member of the Windsor-Lake St. Clair Catholic Family of Parishes. Church built 1868-1869
Visitation		5407 Comber Side Rd, Comber	2006	The parish is a merger of St. Joachim parish in St. Joachim; Annunciation in Stoney Point; Our Lady of Lourdes in Comber and Holy Redeemer in Staples. The church building was opened on December 2, 2006, and has a capacity of 750.
Holy Name of Jesus		146 Talbot St South, Essex	1887	Member of the Central Essex County Catholic Family of Parishes.
St. Anthony of Padua		120 Munger St West, Harrow	1906	Member of the Amherstburg-Harrow Catholic Family of Parishes.
St. John de Bebeuf and Companions		67 Main St East, Kingsville	1930	Member of the Erie Shores South Catholic Family of Parishes.
Good Shepherd		Lakeshore		Member of the Windsor-Lake St. Clair Catholic Family of Parishes. Combined parish formed from merger of St. William & St. Gregory the Great, both of which were created in the 1950s
Sacred Heart		219 Sacred Heart Dr, LaSalle	1921	Church opened 1923. Member of the LaSalle River Canard Catholic Family of Parishes.
St. Michael		29 Elliott St, Leamington	1922	Member of the Erie Shores South Catholic Family of Parishes. The current church building opened on November 4, 2016. The building has a capacity of 540 along with 18 spots for wheelchairs.
St. Mary		12048 County Rd 34, Maidstone	1846	Member of the Central Essex County Catholic Family of Parishes.
St. Clement		9567 County Rd 11, McGregor	1879	Member of the Central Essex County Catholic Family of Parishes.
Star of the Sea		Pelee Island		Member of the Erie Shores South Catholic Family of Parishes.
St. Joseph		River Canard	1864	Member of the LaSalle River Canard Catholic Family of Parishes.
Ste. Anne		12233 Tecumseh Rd East, Tecumseh	1859	Member of the Windsor-Lake St. Clair Catholic Family of Parishes.
Our Lady of the Blessed Sacrament		Wheatley		Member of the Erie Shores South Catholic Family of Parishes.
Assumption		350 Huron Church Rd, Windsor	1767	Member of the Windsor Heritage Catholic Family of Parishes.
Corpus Christi		1400 Cabana Rd West, Windsor	2007	Member of the South Windsor Catholic Family of Parishes.
Holy Trinity		1035 Ellis St East, Windsor	1916	Member of the Rose City Central Catholic Family of Parishes.
Most Precious Blood		1947 Meldrum Rd, Windsor	1929	Member of the North Central Windsor Catholic Family of Parishes.
Our Lady of the Atonement		2940 Forest Glade Dr, Windsor	1975	Member of the East Windsor Catholic Family of Parishes.
Our Lady of Guadalupe		834 Raymo Rd, Windsor	1951	Member of the North Central Windsor Catholic Family of Parishes.
Our Lady of Mount Carmel		4401 Mount Royal Dr, Windsor	1953	Member of the South Windsor Catholic Family of Parishes.
Our Lady of Perpetual Help		804 Grand Marais Rd East, Windsor	1946	Member of the Rose City Central Catholic Family of Parishes.
Paroisse St-Jerome		3739 Rue Ypres, Windsor	1958	Member of the Windsor-Lake St. Clair Catholic Family of Parishes.
St. Alphonsus		85 Park St East, Windsor	1865	Member of the Windsor Heritage Catholic Family of Parishes.
St. Angela Merici		980 Louis Ave, Windsor	1939	Member of the Windsor Heritage Catholic Family of Parishes.
St. Benedict Tridentine Catholic Community		c/o St. Alphonsus, Windsor		Member of the Windsor Heritage Catholic Family of Parishes.
Sts. Cyril and Methodius		1532 Alexis Rd, Windsor	1940	Member of the North Central Windsor Catholic Family of Parishes.
St. Daniel Comboni African Catholic Community		Windsor (c/o St. Alphonsus)		Member of the Windsor Heritage Catholic Family of Parishes.
St. Francis of Assisi		1701 Turner Rd, Windsor	1950	Member of the Rose City Central Catholic Family of Parishes.
St. John Vianney		385 Dieppe St, Windsor	1955	Member of the East Windsor Catholic Family of Parishes.
St. Michael		2153 Parkwood Ave, Windsor	2026	Member of the Rose City Central Catholic Family of Parishes. Parish established on February 1, 2026 as a merger of St. Michael German Parish and Immaculate Heart Parish.
St. Philippe and St. Anne Vietnamese Martyrs		1630 Partington Ave, Windsor		Member of the South Windsor Catholic Family of Parishes.
St. Theresa		1991 Noram Rd, Windsor	1928	Member of the North Central Windsor Catholic Family of Parishes.
St. Yu Jin-Gil Korean Catholic Community		c/o Our Lady of Mount Carmel, Windsor	2012	Member of the South Windsor Catholic Family of Parishes.
San Juan Diego of Guadalupe Hispanic Catholic Community		834 Raymo Rd, Windsor		Member of the North Central Windsor Catholic Family of Parishes.
St. John the Evangelist		R.R. 1, 1688 County Rd 46, Woodslee	1874	Member of the Central Essex County Catholic Family of Parishes.

== Former Churches ==
Name	Exterior & Interior Image	Location	Description/Notes
St. Matthew Church		Alvinston	Church closed on June 30, 2007. Located in Our Lady Help of Christians Parish, Watford.
English Martyrs Church		Bayfield	Church closed on October 11, 2006. Located in St. Peter Parish, St. Joseph.
St. Columba Church		Bornish	
St. Ignatius Church		Bothwell	Church closed on June 30, 2007. Located in St. Paul Parish, Thamesville.
St. Anthony of Padua Church		Chatham	Church closed on August 10, 2008.
St. Agnes		52 Croydon St, Chatham	Parish founded in 1957. The church was blessed on November 23, 1958, and enlarged in 1981. The parish was suppressed on January 21, 2025, and church closed on the same day.
St. Joseph Church		Clinton	Church closed on July 8, 2007. Located in St. Peter Parish, Goderich.
Our Lady of Lourdes Church		Comber	Church closed on January 1, 2006. Located in Parish of the Visitation, Comber.
St. Ladislaus Church		Courtland	Hungarian Parish. Church closed on December 29, 2013.
St. Charles Borromeo Church		Courtright	Church closed on June 30, 2007. Located in St. Joseph Parish, Corunna.
Sacred Heart		Delaware	Church building closed in 2018. Parish suppressed in 2024.
St. Casimir		41 Talbot Rd, Delhi	Formerly called St. John de Brebeuf and Companions Church 1932-1956; Church closed and parish suppressed on December 1, 2020.
St. William Church		Emeryville	Church closed on September 5, 2016. Boundaries absorbed by Good Shepherd Parish, Lakeshore.
St. Philippe Church		Grande Pointe	Church closed on April 30, 2007. Located in Immaculée Conception Parish, Pain Court.
St. Mary of Perpetual Help Church		Hesson	Church closed on June 24, 2007. Located in St. Joseph Parish, Listowel.
St. Joseph Church		Kingsbridge	Church closed on October 21, 2012. Located in St. Peter Parish, Goderich.
Our Lady of LaSalette Church		La Salette	Church closed on November 1, 2011. Located in Our Lady, Queen of Martyrs Parish, Delhi LaSalette.
St. Paul		5885 Malden Rd, LaSalle	Church dedicated 1953. The church was closed and the parish suppressed on March 21, 2026 due to low attendence and costly repairs. Former member of the LaSalle River Canard Catholic Family of Parishes.
St. Joseph Church		Leamington	Church closed on January 0, 1900..
St. Brigid Church		Logan	Church closed on June 30, 2007. Located in St. Patrick Parish, Kinkora and St. Vincent de Paul Parish, Mitchell.
Blessed Sacrament Church		London	Church closed on June 30, 2006. Located in St. Patrick Parish, London.
Holy Rosary Church		London	Church closed on September 14, 2005. Located in St. Martin of Tours Parish, London.
St. Joseph Church		London	Church closed on July 9, 2006. Located in Holy Family Parish, London.
St. Patrick Church		Merlin	Parish closed on October 25, 2015. Church is a part of Our Lady of the Rosary Shrine Diocesan Shrine.
Our Lady of the Angels Church		Pardoville	Church closed on April 30, 2007. Located in: St. Mary Parish, Blenheim.
St. Edward the Confessor Church		Point Edward	Church closed on April 6, 2004. Located in Our Lady of Mercy Parish, Sarnia.
St. Joseph Church		Port Burwell	Church closed on June 23, 2003. Located in Our Lady of Sorrows Parish, Aylmer, Sacred Heart Parish, Langton and St. Mary Parish, Tillsonburg.
St. Joseph Church		Port Stanley	Church closed on November 2, 2008. Located in Holy Angels Parish, St. Thomas.
Sacred Heart Church		Princeton	Church closed on August 27, 2006. Located in Holy Trinity Parish, Woodstock.
Our Lady of Sorrows		Sarnia	Church closed on September 13, 2008. Sacramental records located at: The Archives of the Diocese of London.
St. Peter Church		Sarnia	Church closed on June 30, 2007. Located in Our Lady of Mercy Parish Sarnia, St. Benedict Parish, Sarnia and Sacred Heart Parish, Sarnia.
St. Augustine Church		St. Augustine	Church closed on October 31, 2006. Located in St. Peter Parish, Goderich.
St. Columban Church		St. Columban	Church closed on June 26, 2005. Located in St. James Parish, Seaforth.
St. Joachim Church		St. Joachim	Church closed on January 1, 2006. Located in Parish of the Visitation, Comber.
Immaculate Conception		50 Well St, Stratford	Church closed November 7, 2026.
St. Charles Church		Stevenson	Church closed on March 17, 2006. Located in St. Francis Xavier Parish, Tilbury.
Church of the Annunciation		Stoney Point	Church closed on November 19, 2006. Demolished in November 2023. Located in Parish of the Visitation, Comber.
St. Gregory the Great Church		Tecumseh	Church closed on September 5, 2016. Boundaries absorbed by Good Shepherd Parish, Lakeshore.
Blessed Sacrament Church		Windsor	Church closed on June 30, 2012. Located in Our Lady of the Assumption Parish, Windsor.
Christ the King Church		Windsor	Church closed on January 1, 2007. Located in Corpus Christi Parish, Windsor.
Immaculate Conception Church		Windsor	Church closed on January 1, 2007. Located in Immaculate Heart Parish, Windsor.
Our Lady of Fatima Church		Windsor	Church closed on June 4, 2006. Located in St. John Vianney Parish, Windsor.
Our Lady of the Rosary Church		Windsor	Church closed on June 30, 2008. Located in Most Precious Blood Parish, Windsor and Our Lady of Guadalupe Parish, Windsor.
Sacred Heart Church		Windsor	Church closed on January 1, 2007. Located in Immaculate Heart Parish, Windsor.
St. Anne Church		Windsor	Church closed on June 30, 2008. Located in Most Precious Blood Parish, Windsor and Our Lady of Guadalupe Parish, Windsor.
St. Anthony of Padua		c/o St. John Vianney, Windsor	Parish suppressed October 18, 2026.
St. Casimir Church		Windsor	Church closed on September 30, 2009. Sacramental records located at: The Archives of the Diocese of London.
St. Christopher Church		Windsor	Church closed on June 3, 2007. Located in Our Lady of Perpetual Help Parish, Windsor.
St. Clare of Assisi Church		Windsor	Church closed on June 15, 2000. Located in St. Alphonsus Parish, Windsor.
St. Joseph the Worker Church		Windsor	Church closed on October 14, 2002. Located in Most Precious Blood Parish, Windsor.
St. Martin de Porres Church		Windsor	Church closed on January 1, 2007. Located in Corpus Christi Parish, Windsor.
St. Patrick Church		Windsor	Church closed on June 20, 2010. Located in Corpus Christi Parish and Assumption Parish, Windsor.
St. Rose of Lima Church		Windsor	Church closed on June 28, 2009. Located in Our Lady of Guadalupe Parish, Windsor.
St. Thomas the Apostle Church		Windsor	Church closed on July 6, 2008. Located in Our Lady of Guadalupe Parish, Windsor.
St. Vincent de Paul Church		Windsor	Church closed on October 7, 2022. Located in Atonement Parish, Windsor.
St. Mary Church		Woodstock	Church closed on June 28, 2006. Located in Holy Trinity Parish, Woodstock.
St. Rita Church		Woodstock	Church closed on May 27, 2013. Located in Holy Trinity Parish, Woodstock.
Holy Rosary Church		Wyoming	Church closed on June 30, 2007. Located in St. Philip Parish, Petrolia.
