= Miehm =

Miehm is a surname. Notable people with the surname include:

- Grant Miehm Canadian illustrator
- Kevin Miehm (born 1969), Canadian ice hockey player
- Daniel Miehm (born 1960), Canadian bishop
