= List of Roman Catholic archbishops of Toronto =

Archbishop of Toronto
- Archbishopric

catholic
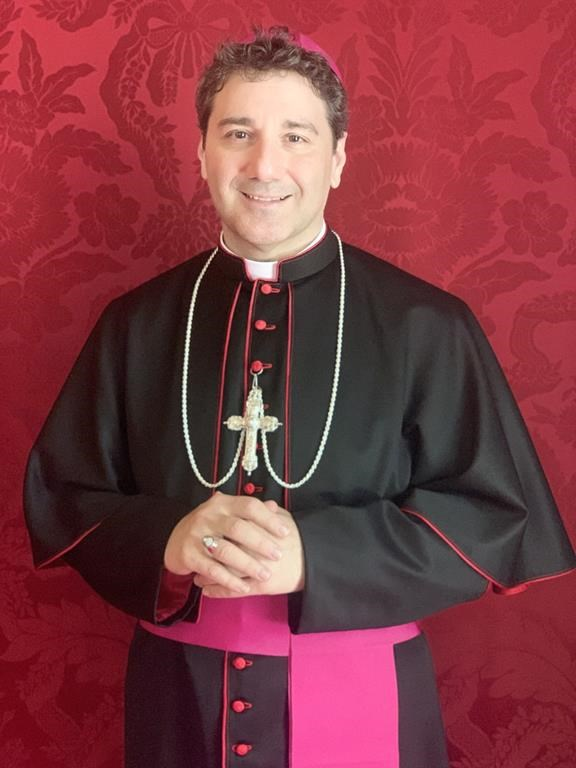
- Incumbent; Frank Leo since February 11, 2023

Information
- First holder: Michael Power (bishop); John Joseph Lynch (archbishop)
- Established: 1841 (bishopric); 1870 (archbishopric)
- Archdiocese: Toronto
- Cathedral: St. Michael's Cathedral Basilica

Website
- Official website

The archbishop of Toronto is the head of the Roman Catholic Archdiocese of Toronto, responsible for looking after its spiritual and administrative needs. As the archdiocese is the metropolitan see of the ecclesiastical province that encompasses Southern Ontario and part of Northwestern Ontario in Canada, the archbishop also administers the bishops who head the suffragan dioceses of Hamilton, London, Saint Catharines, and Thunder Bay. The current archbishop is Frank Leo.

The archdiocese began as the Diocese of Toronto, which was created on December 17, 1841. Michael Power was appointed its first bishop, and under his reign the construction of St. Michael's Cathedral Basilica in Toronto commenced, with Power himself laying the cornerstone of the new church. On March 18, 1870, (Note: The Archdiocese maintains that the date of its elevation was March 18. On the other hand, the Dictionary of Canadian Biography states the date as March 15, while Encyclopedia.com lists March 25.) the diocese was elevated to the status of archdiocese by Pope Pius IX while the First Vatican Council was in session. John Joseph Lynch became the first archbishop of the newly-formed metropolitan see, and received the pallium during his sojourn in Rome to attend the council.

Ten men have been Archbishop of Toronto; another two were the bishop of its predecessor diocese. Five archbishops – James McGuigan, Gerald Emmett Carter, Aloysius Ambrozic, Thomas Collins, and Leo – were elevated to the College of Cardinals. Power, the first ordinary of the archdiocese, was also the first English-speaking bishop to be born in Canada. Denis O'Connor, whose episcopacy spanned from 1899 to 1908, was the first archbishop born in Ontario. When McGuigan was raised to cardinal in 1946, he became the first anglophone cardinal from Canada, as well as the first cardinal from the archdiocese. He also had the longest tenure as Archbishop of Toronto, serving for 36 years from 1934 to 1971, while Fergus McEvay held the position for three years (1908–1911), marking the shortest archiepiscopacy.

== List of ordinaries ==
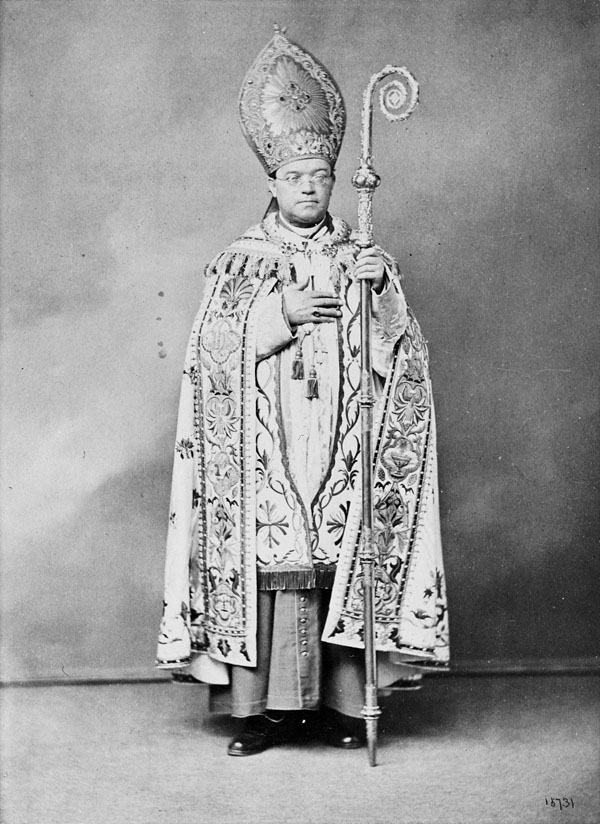
John Joseph Lynch was the last bishop of Toronto and its first archbishop.

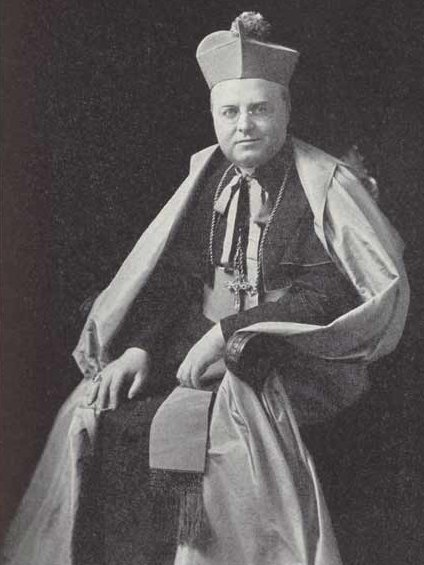
James McGuigan became Canada's first English-speaking cardinal in 1946.

Key
‡	Denotes archbishop who was elevated to the College of Cardinals
CM	Congregation of the Mission
CSB	Congregation of St. Basil
PSS	Society of the Priests of Saint Sulpice

=== Bishops of Toronto ===
From	Until	Incumbent	Notes	Ref(s)
1841	1847	Michael Power	Appointed on December 17, 1841. First English-speaking bishop to be born in Canada. Died on October 1, 1847.	
1849	1849	John Larkin	Appointed February 14, 1849, appointment declined by Larkin and did not take effect	
1850	1860	Armand-François-Marie de Charbonnel, PSS	Appointed on March 15, 1850. Resigned on April 29, 1860, and returned to France. Died on March 29, 1891.	
1860	1870	John Joseph Lynch, CM	Coadjutor bishop (Note: Under the Code of Canon Law, the coadjutor bishop has the right of succession (cum jure successionis) upon the death, retirement or resignation of the diocesan bishop he is assisting.) from 1859 to 1860.	

=== Archbishops of Toronto ===
From	Until	Incumbent	Notes	Ref(s)
1870	1888	John Joseph Lynch, CM	Became the first Archbishop of Toronto on March 18, 1870. Died on May 12, 1888.	
1889	1898	John Walsh	Appointed on August 13, 1889. Died on July 30, 1898.	
1899	1908	Denis O'Connor, CSB	Appointed on January 7, 1899. Resigned on May 4, 1908. Died on June 30, 1911.	
1908	1911	Fergus McEvay	Appointed on April 13, 1908. Died on May 10, 1911.	
1912	1934	Neil McNeil	Appointed on April 10, 1912. Died on May 25, 1934.	
1934	1971	James McGuigan^{‡}	Appointed on December 22, 1934. Elevated to cardinal on February 18, 1946. Retired on March 30, 1971, after reaching the mandatory retirement age of 75. Died on April 8, 1974.	
1971	1978	Philip Pocock	Coadjutor archbishop from 1961 to 1971. Resigned on April 27, 1978. Died on September 6, 1984	
1978	1990	Gerald Emmett Carter^{‡}	Appointed on April 27, 1978. Elevated to cardinal on June 30, 1979. Retired on March 17, 1990, after reaching the mandatory retirement age of 75. Died on April 6, 2003.	
1990	2006	Aloysius Ambrozic^{‡}	Auxiliary bishop from 1976 to 1986. Coadjutor archbishop from 1986 to 1990. Elevated to cardinal on February 18, 1998. Retired on December 16, 2006, after reaching the mandatory retirement age of 75. Died on August 26, 2011.	
2007	2023	Thomas Collins^{‡}	Appointed on December 16, 2006. Elevated to cardinal on February 18, 2012. Retired on February 11, 2023, after reaching the mandatory retirement age of 75.	
2023	present	Frank Leo^{‡}	Appointed on February 11, 2023. Elevated to cardinal on December 7, 2024.	
