= Gerald Emmett Carter =

Catholic cardinal

His Eminence Gerald Emmett Carter CC
- Cardinal, Archbishop Emeritus of Toronto
- See: Toronto
- Appointed: April 27, 1978
- Installed: June 5, 1978
- Term ended: March 17, 1990
- Predecessor: Philip Francis Pocock
- Successor: Aloysius Ambrozic
- Other post: Bishop of London

Orders
- Ordination: May 22, 1937 by Alphonse Emmanuel Deschamps
- Consecration: February 2, 1962 by Paul-Émile Léger
- Created cardinal: June 30, 1979 by Pope John Paul II

Personal details
- Born: March 1, 1912 Montreal, Quebec, Canada
- Died: April 6, 2003 (aged 91) Toronto, Ontario, Canada
- Buried: Holy Cross Catholic Cemetery, Thornhill, Ontario
- Coat of arms: Gerald Emmett Carter's coat of arms

Ordination history
History
Priestly ordination
- Ordained by: Alphonse Emmanuel Deschamps
- Date: May 22, 1937
- Place: Montreal
Episcopal consecration
- Principal consecrator: Paul-Émile Léger
- Co-consecrators: John Christopher Cody, Alexander Carter
- Date: February 2, 1962
- Place: Montreal
Cardinalate
- Elevated by: Pope John Paul II
- Date: June 30, 1979
Episcopal succession
Bishops consecrated by Gerald Emmett Carter as principal consecrator
- Peter Alfred Sutton: July 18, 1974
- Eugène Philippe LaRocque: September 3, 1974
- James Leonard Doyle: June 28, 1976
- Michael Pearse Lacey: June 21, 1979
- Robert Bell Clune: June 21, 1979
- Leonard James Wall: June 21, 1979
- Attila Miklósházy: November 4, 1989

Gerald Emmett Cardinal Carter CC (March 1, 1912 – April 6, 2003) was a Canadian prelate of the Roman Catholic Church. He served as Archbishop of Toronto from 1978 to 1990, and was elevated to the cardinalate in 1979.

Styles of Gerald Emmett Carter
- Reference style: His Eminence
- Spoken style: Your Eminence
- Religious style: Cardinal
- Posthumous style: none
- Informal style: Cardinal
- See: Toronto (emeritus)

== Biography ==
=== Youth and ordination ===
The youngest of eight children, Emmett Carter was born on March 1, 1912, in Montreal, Quebec, to an Irish Catholic family. His father was a typesetter for The Montreal Star, his brother, Alexander, would become Bishop of Sault-Sainte-Marie, and two of his sisters would become nuns.

Carter attended the Collège de Montréal before studying at the Grand Seminary and the Université de Montréal, where he obtained his Licentiate in Theology in 1936. He was ordained to the priesthood by the Auxiliary Bishop of Montreal Alphonse Emmanuel Deschamps on May 22, 1937.

=== Parish work ===
Carter then did pastoral work in the Archdiocese of Montreal until 1939, when he became the first director of the English section of Jacques-Cartier Normal school.

During his tenure as chaplain to the Catholic students at McGill University from 1942 to 1956, where he played a key role in establishing the Newman Centre of McGill University, he was also named director of the English section of Catholic Action (1944) and president of the Thomas More Institute (1946), and earned his doctorate in theology in 1947.

=== Archbishop of Toronto ===
He was Bishop of London, Ontario, from 1964 to 1978, when he was appointed Archbishop of Toronto. He retired in 1990 and was succeeded by Aloysius Ambrozic.

In 1976, he received an honorary doctorate from Concordia University. In 1982 he was made a Companion of the Order of Canada. The library at King's University College at the University of Western Ontario in London is named after him, as are Cardinal Carter Catholic High School in Aurora, Ontario, Cardinal Carter Academy for the Arts in Toronto, Ontario and Cardinal Carter Catholic Secondary School in Leamington, Ontario.

An important figure in Montreal's education system, founding St. Joseph's Teachers College for English-speaking Catholics, Cardinal Carter was a member of the Montreal Catholic School Commission for 15 years, and active at McGill University's Newman Club and the St. Thomas More Institute.

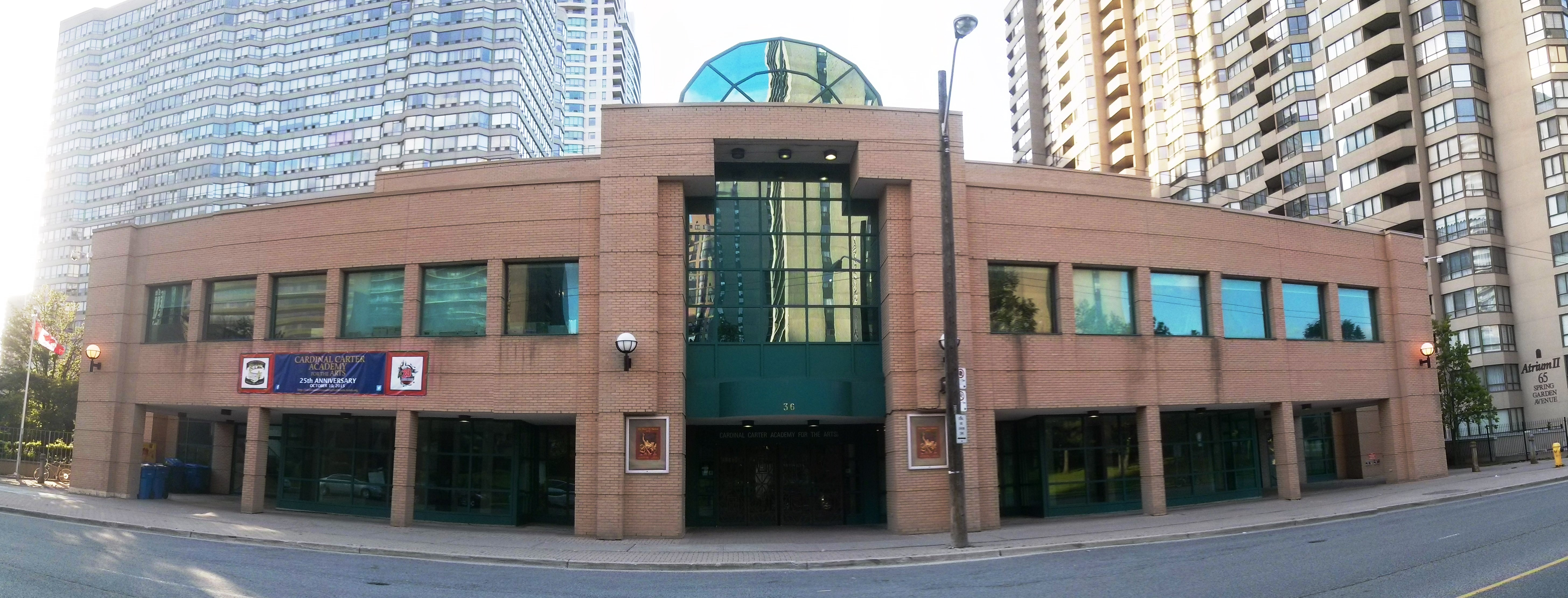
Cardinal Carter Academy for the Arts in Toronto, named after Carter

== Pastoral programs ==
In Toronto, Carter was responsible for expanding the Archdiocese's pastoral programs, Catholic education and social services as well as implementing the reforms of Vatican II. He was involved with the opening of Covenant House for street youth and worked with the province of Ontario to provide affordable housing to the elderly and disabled.

Cardinal Carter died in Toronto on April 6, 2003, and is buried at the Bishops' Mausoleum at Holy Cross Cemetery north of Toronto.

== Bibliography ==
- "Gerald Emmett Cardinal Carter". Catholic-Hierarchy.

Catholic Church titles
Preceded by Philip Francis Pocock	Archbishop of Toronto; 1978–1990	Succeeded by Aloysius Ambrozic
Preceded by John Christopher Cody	Bishop of London; 1964–1978	Succeeded by John Michael Sherlock
