= Eugène Philippe LaRocque =

Canadian Catholic bishop (1927–2018)

Eugène LaRocque
- Bishop Emeritus of Alexandria-Cornwall
- Installed: September 15, 1974
- Term ended: April 27, 2002
- Predecessor: Adolphe E. Proulx
- Successor: Paul-André Durocher

Orders
- Ordination: June 7, 1952
- Consecration: September 3, 1974

Personal details
- Born: March 27, 1927 Windsor, Ontario, Canada
- Died: December 16, 2018 (aged 91) Windsor, Ontario, Canada

Ordination history of Eugène Philippe LaRocque
History
Episcopal consecration
- Principal consecrator: Gerald Emmett Carter
- Co-consecrators: Jean-Marie Fortier, Philip Francis Pocock

Eugène Philippe LaRocque (27 March 1927 – 16 December 2018) was a Canadian Catholic priest who was the Bishop of Alexandria-Cornwall from 1974 to 2002.

LaRocque served as State Chaplain for the Knights of Columbus in Ontario from 1977 to 1987 and President of Assembly of Catholic Bishops of Ontario from 1993 to 1997.
