= Pierre-Adolphe Pinsonnault =

- Bishop of Sandwich, Ontario
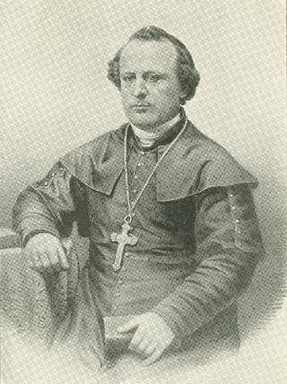
- Diocese: London
- Elected: 1856
- Term ended: 1866
- Successor: John Walsh

Personal details
- Born: November 23, 1815 Saint-Philippe, Lower Canada
- Died: January 30, 1883 (aged 67) Montreal, Quebec

Bishop Pierre-Adolphe Pinsonnault, (also Pinsonnault or Pinsonault), (23 November 1815 – 30 January 1883), was born in Lower Canada and became a Roman Catholic priest in the Sulpician Order.

Pinsoneault served as Bishop of the Roman Catholic Diocese of London, Ontario from 1856 to 1866 in an atmosphere of turbulence. There was an initial adverse reaction to a French-speaking bishop taking over the London church as the cathedral of the new diocese. A variety of events occurred both with priests and parishioners during his tenure and, in 1866, Bishop Ignace Bourget, as result of an earlier request by Pope Pius IX, asked for and received Pinsonnault's resignation.

After his resignation, Bishop Pinsoneault was assigned as bishop to the titular see of Birtha and resided in Albany, New York, until 1869. He then moved to Montreal. Quebec, where he performed various duties that required a bishop for the ultramontane Bishop Bouget.

He died in Montreal at the age of 67, his episcopacy a failure due largely to his disregard for others and his authoritarian style.
