= John Joseph Lynch =

Irish prelate of the Catholic church

The Most Reverend John Joseph Lynch CM
- Archbishop of Toronto
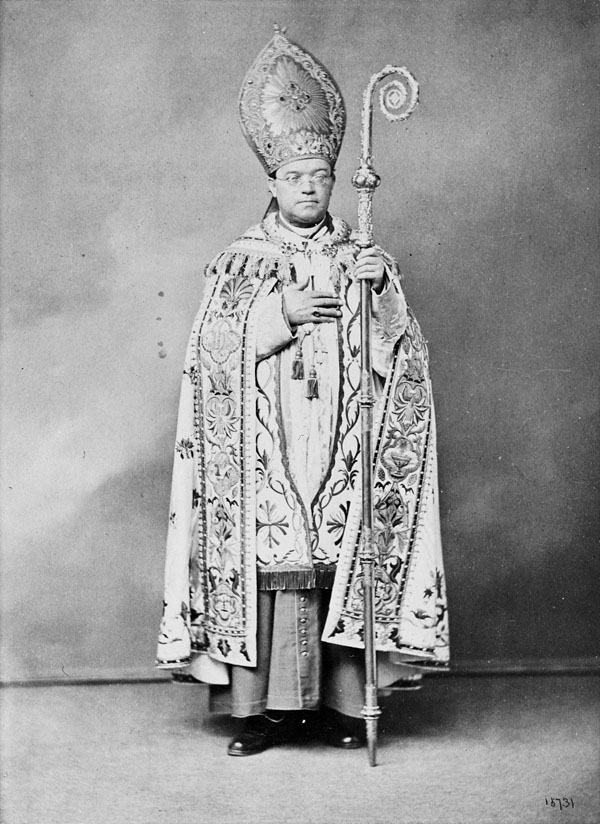
- Church: Catholic Church
- Diocese: Archdiocese of Toronto
- Appointed: 26 April 1860
- Term ended: 12 May 1888 (his death)
- Predecessor: Armand-François-Marie de Charbonnel
- Successor: John Walsh

Orders
- Ordination: 10 June 1843 by Daniel Murray
- Consecration: 20 November 1859 by Armand-François-Marie de Charbonnel

Personal details
- Born: 6 February 1816 Clones, County Fermanagh, Ireland
- Died: 12 May 1888 (aged 72) Toronto, Ontario, Canada

John Joseph Lynch CM (6 February 1816 – 12 May 1888) was an Irish Catholic prelate who served as the third Bishop (1860–1870) and first Archbishop of Toronto (1870–1888). He founded Our Lady of Angels Seminary (now Niagara University) in 1856. He was a member of the Vincentians.

== Biography ==
=== Early life in Ireland ===
Lynch was born on 6 February 1816 in Clones, County Fermanagh, to James and Ann (née Connolly) Lynch. His father was a schoolmaster at a hedge school. He and his family later moved to the Dublin suburb of Lucan, where he received his early education. When the Congregation of the Mission (also known as the Vincentians or Lazarists) opened Castleknock College in 1835, Lynch was the first student to enroll. He entered the seminary of St. Lazare in Paris in 1837, making his profession as a Vincentian on 21 November 1841.

His superiors sent him back to Ireland for his priestly ordination, which was performed on 10 June 1843 by Archbishop Daniel Murray in Maynooth. He engaged in pastoral work until 1846, when his fellow Vincentian, Bishop John Odin, visited Ireland to recruit priests for Texas and Lynch offered his services.

=== Missionary in America ===
After a voyage of a few weeks, Lynch arrived in New Orleans on 29 June 1846 and then went to join Bishop Odin in Galveston. At the time of his arrival in July 1846, the Catholic population of Texas numbered around 10,000 people scattered over an immense area of land, and many Irish immigrants had abandoned Catholicism due to the lack of Catholic churches at that time. With Houston serving as his base, he began work as a circuit rider and traveled through cities and prairies on horseback. He worked to convert non-Catholics and to administer the sacraments to Catholics, many of whom had not seen a priest in years. It was demanding and often dangerous work; Lynch would later recall that he reached "the point of death three times, was anointed once, and had no priest within 100 miles."

When his health began to suffer, Lynch was sent in 1848 to recuperate at St. Mary's of the Barrens in Perryville, Missouri, the American headquarters of the Vincentians and home of a diocesan seminary. He was named rector of the seminary the following year, serving until 1856. During his tenure at the Barrens, he was asked by John Timon, a fellow Vincentian and the Bishop of Buffalo, to establish a new seminary in his diocese. In 1855, while representing the American province at the Vincentian assembly in Paris, Lynch obtained approval from the Superior General for the project. He founded the Seminary of Our Lady of Angels (later known as Niagara University) at Niagara Falls in 1856 and served as its first president.

=== Bishop in Canada ===
On 26 August 1859, Lynch was appointed coadjutor bishop with the right of succession to Bishop Armand-François-Marie de Charbonnel of the Diocese of Toronto, Canada. He was also given the titular see of Echinus. He received his episcopal consecration on the following 20 November from Bishop de Charbonnel, with Bishop Timon of Buffalo and Bishop John Farrell of Hamilton serving as co-consecrators, at St. Michael's Cathedral in Toronto.

Bishop de Charbonnel, who struggled to understand English, had long sought a coadjutor to replace him so he could return to France. He resigned almost immediately and Lynch succeeded him as the third Bishop of Toronto on 26 April 1860. On 18 March 1870, while Lynch was attending the First Vatican Council, Toronto was elevated to an archdiocese by Pope Pius IX, promoting Lynch to Archbishop.

While he fought for a fair Catholic separate school system, Lynch had warm relationships with Protestant leaders like Oliver Mowat and Egerton Ryerson, to which some Catholics and other bishops objected. He also encouraged the consideration of Catholics for patronage appointments and other political offices. Concerned about the public image of the Irish community, he encouraged them to practice temperance to show they were responsible citizens. He supported the Irish Home Rule movement but opposed physical force nationalism, forbidding Jeremiah O'Donovan Rossa from entering St. Michael's Cathedral when he visited Toronto in 1878.

Lynch oversaw a period of significant growth in the diocese. During his 28 years as bishop and archbishop, 70 priests were ordained, 40 churches, 30 presbyteries, and 7 convents were established. He convoked diocesan synods in 1863 and 1882, as well as a provincial council in 1875. He celebrated the silver jubilee of his ordination as a priest in 1868 and bishop in 1884.

Lynch died in Toronto on 12 May 1888, at age 72. He is buried in the garden of St Michael's Cathedral.

== Legacy ==
John J. Lynch High School in Toronto, Ontario was named after him in his honor when it opened in 1963 and now known today as Senator O'Connor College School since 1967.

Religious titles
Preceded by Armand-François-Marie de Charbonnel	Bishop of Toronto; 1860–1870	Succeeded by himself as Archbishop of Toronto
Preceded by himself as Bishop of Toronto	Archbishop of Toronto; 1870–1888	Succeeded by John Walsh
