= List of Superiors General of the Congregation of the Mission =

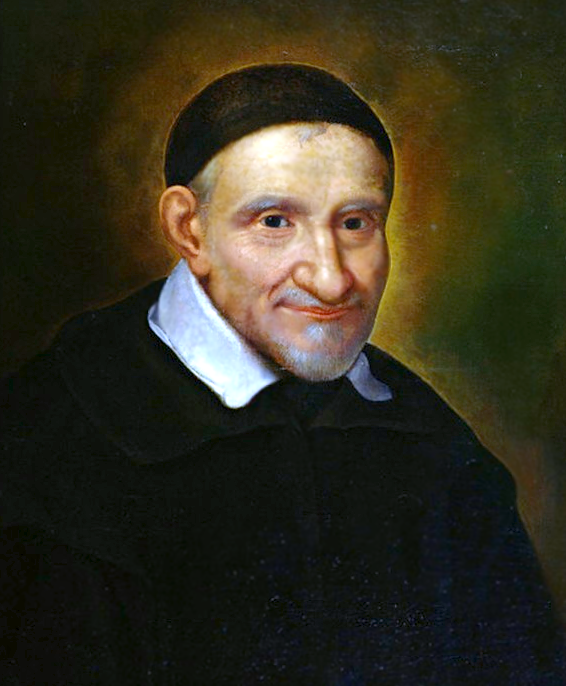
First Superior General, Vincent de Paul

List of Superiors General of the Congregation of the Mission.

No.	Superior General	Took office	Left office
1	Vincent de Paul	April 17, 1625	September 27, 1660
2	René Alméras	January 17, 1661	September 22, 1672
3	Edmond Jolly	January 1673	March 26, 1697
4	Nicolas Pierron	1697	1703
5	François Watel	1703	1710
6	Jean Bonnet	May 10, 1711	September 3, 1735
7	Jean Couty	1736	1746
8	Louis de Bras	March 6, 1747	August 21, 1761
9	Antoine Jacquier	1762	1787
10	Jean Félix Cayla de la Garde	1788	February 12, 1800
11	Pierre-Joseph Dewailly	1827	October 25, 1828
12	Dominique Salhorgne	1829	May 25, 1836
13	Jean-Baptiste-Rigobert Nozo	1835	1842
14	Jean-Baptiste Étienne	1843	1874
15	Eugène Boré	September 11, 1874	May 3, 1878
16	Antoine Fiat	1878	1914
17	Emile Villette	1914	1916
18	François Verdier	1919	1933
19	Charles Souvay	1933	1939
20	William Slattery	1947	1968
21	James Richardson	1968	1980
22	Richard McCullen	1980	1992
23	Robert P. Maloney	1992	July 15, 2004
24	Gregory Gay	July 15, 2004	July 5, 2016
25	Tomaž Mavrič	July 5, 2016	incumbent
