= John Walsh (bishop) =

Irish Roman Catholic Archbishop of Toronto (1830-1898)

His Grace John Walsh
- Archbishop of Toronto
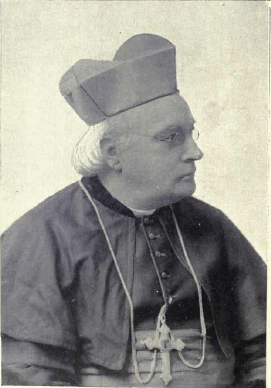
- Diocese: Archdiocese of Toronto
- Installed: 25 July 1889
- Term ended: 30 July 1898
- Predecessor: John Joseph Lynch
- Successor: Denis T. O'Connor
- Other post: Bishop of London, Ontario

Orders
- Ordination: 1 November 1854 by Armand-François-Marie de Charbonnel
- Consecration: 10 November 1867 by Charles-François Baillargeon

Personal details
- Born: May 24, 1830 Mooncoin, County Kilkenny, Ireland
- Died: July 30, 1898 (aged 68) Toronto, Ontario
- Buried: St. Michael's Cathedral, Toronto, Ontario
- Denomination: Roman Catholic

John Walsh (24 May 1830 – 30 July 1898) was the Roman Catholic Archbishop of Toronto, Canada from 1889 to 1898.

== Early years ==
Born in Mooncoin, County Kilkenny, Ireland, Walsh was educated at St. John's College, Waterford before he to Canada in 1852 to complete his studies at the Saint-Sulpice Seminary in Montreal, Lower Canada. He was ordained a priest of Toronto, Upper Canada in 1854 by then Bishop of Toronto Armand-François-Marie de Charbonnel, at St. Michael's Cathedral. On his way to Toronto, in the summer of 1854, Walsh came down cholera, which permanently undermined his health.

Father Walsh served as pastor at Brock. In April 1857 he was made parish priest of St Mary’s in Toronto, a parish established by Irish immigrants in 1852. A year later, he went to St. Paul's. In 1860, Walsh was made rector of the Cathedral, but chose to resign the position in 1861 and resume his former place at St. Mary's, while from April 1862 he also served as Vicar General of the Archdiocese. In 1864, he was sent to Rome on business, toured Europe, and spent some time in Ireland.

He was consecrated as Bishop of Sandwich, Ontario in November 1867, and two years later returned the seat of the See to its previous site of London, Ontario and procured from Rome a decree making London once more the name of the diocese. He served as Bishop of London, Ontario until 1889, when he was translated to the see of Toronto. Having paid off the diocese's considerable debt, Walsh the undertook the construction of St. Peter's Cathedral, designed by Joseph Connolly

In August 1889 Bishop Walsh was appointed Archbishop of Toronto, and installed on 27 Nov 1889. During his tenure he established the Sacred Heart Orphanage at Sunnyside, and St. John's Industrial School for Boys, and purchased land for the establishment of Mount Hope Catholic Cemetery, as St. Michael's was near capacity. Walsh also invited French Canadian clergy from Quebec to staff the French-speaking parishes in Kent and Essex counties.

In 1894, the Archbishop secured a $40,000 (the equivalent of $1.48 million in 2024) gift from Catholic railway magnate Hugh Ryan to build a three-storey surgical wing for St Michael's Hospital, Toronto. The expansion put the hospital on the path to becoming one of Canada's preeminent teaching University, with its state-of-the-art operating theatre designed to accommodate fifty medical students.

Walsh died in Toronto in 1898 and is buried at St. Michael's Cathedral, Toronto.
