= St. Peter's Cathedral Basilica (London, Ontario) =

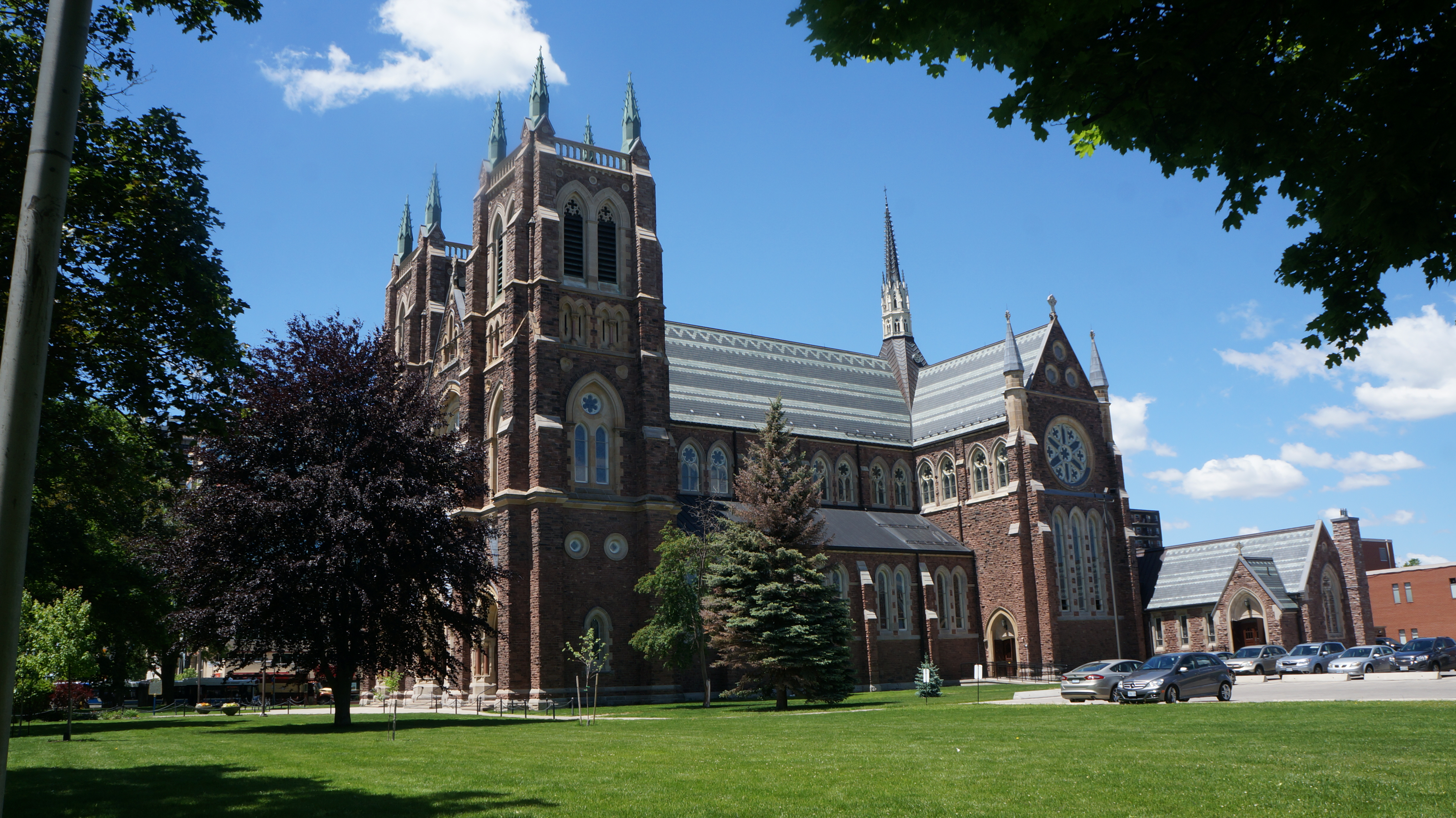
- St. Peter's Cathedral Basilica
- St. Peter's Cathedral Basilica
- 42°59′13″N 81°15′0″W
- Location: 196 Dufferin Avenue; London, Ontario; N6A 1K8
- Denomination: Roman Catholic
- Website: St. Peter's Website

History
- Status: Cathedral, minor basilica

Administration
- Diocese: London
- Deanery: London
- Parish: St. Peter's

Clergy
- Bishop(s): Most Rev. Ronald Peter Fabbro, CSB
- Pastor: Fr. Daniel Bombardier

St. Peter's Cathedral Basilica, is a church located at 196 Dufferin Avenue in London, Ontario, Canada in the Roman Catholic Diocese of London.

== History ==
The parish now known as St. Peter's was established 10 August 1834 and the first church was constructed of logs at the southwest corner of Dufferin Avenue and Richmond Street. Prior to this, a travelling priest visited the area to celebrate Mass for Catholic residents. The church was dedicated to St. Lawrence and could hold 180 people. It was destroyed along with much of the town in the London fire of 11 April 1845.

A larger frame church was built with donated materials and labour, but this church also burned in August 1850. This was replaced by a new St. Lawrence Church constructed of brick. The new church was located at the northeast corner of Dufferin and Richmond, just in front of the present structure. This land was granted by the Crown to Bishop Alexander Macdonell of the Diocese of Kingston. The cornerstone for the new church was laid 29 June 1851, the Feast of Sts. Peter and Paul.

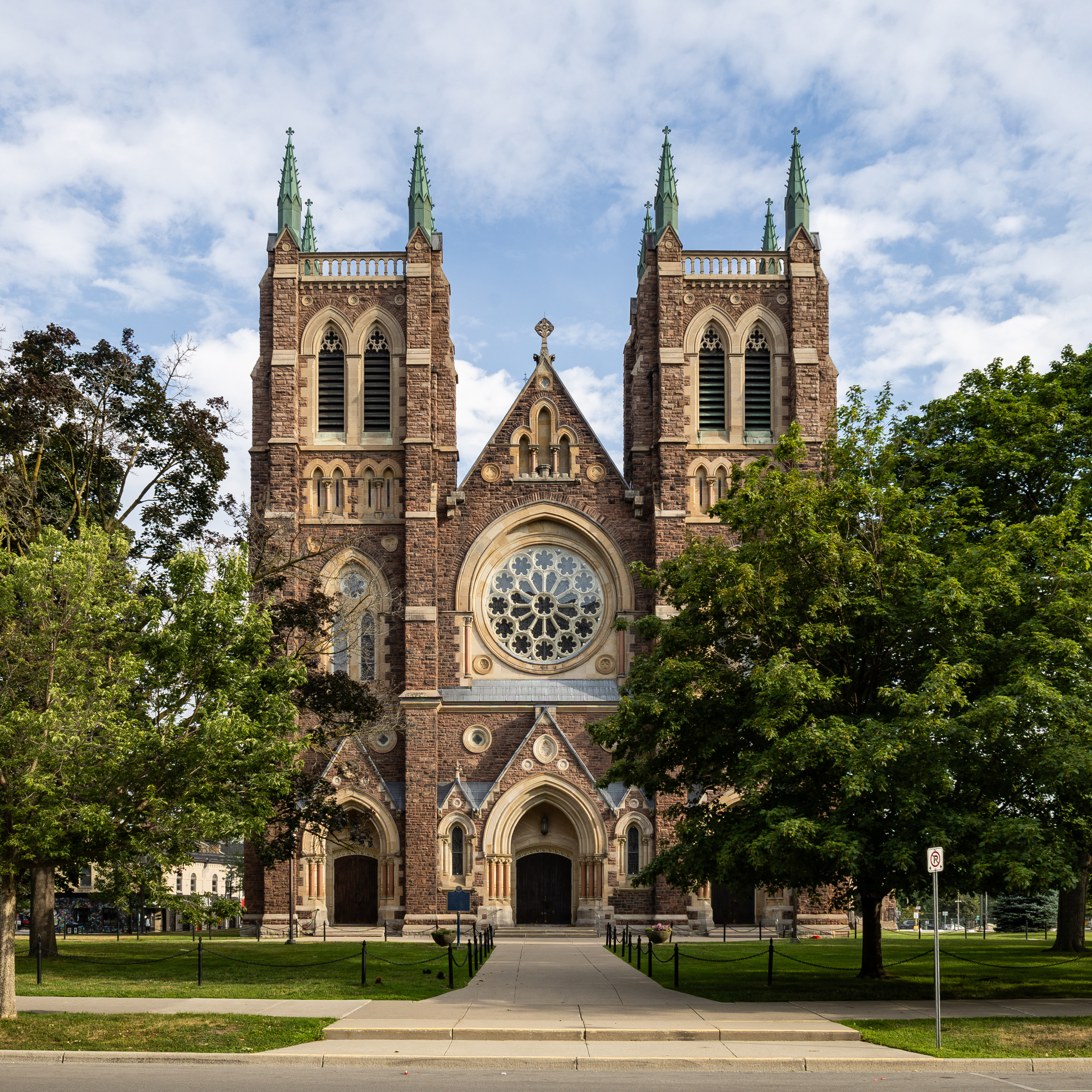
The two towers at the front facade of the church were completed in 1957

The Diocese of London was created in 1856 and Bishop Pierre-Adolphe Pinsoneault selected St. Lawrence as his cathedral renaming the church St. Peter's. In 1859, Bishop Pinsoneault moved the seat to Windsor where it remained until 1868 when Bishop John Walsh, Pinsoneault's successor, moved it back to London.

Bishop Walsh felt that the diocese should have a cathedral that was a true monument to its people. He selected Joseph Connolly as architect and construction began in July 1880. The structure was built in a 13th-century French French Gothic Revival style between 1880 and 1885. The cathedral was dedicated 28 June 1885. The first stained glass windows were added in 1889 but the interior decoration was not completed until 1926. The Casavant organ was also installed in that year.

In 1958, the twin towers of the facade, Lady Chapel, and sacristy were added, stained glass windows were installed in the narthex and additional interior painting and decoration completed. St. Peter's was raised to the status of a minor basilica 13 December 1961 by Pope John XXIII.

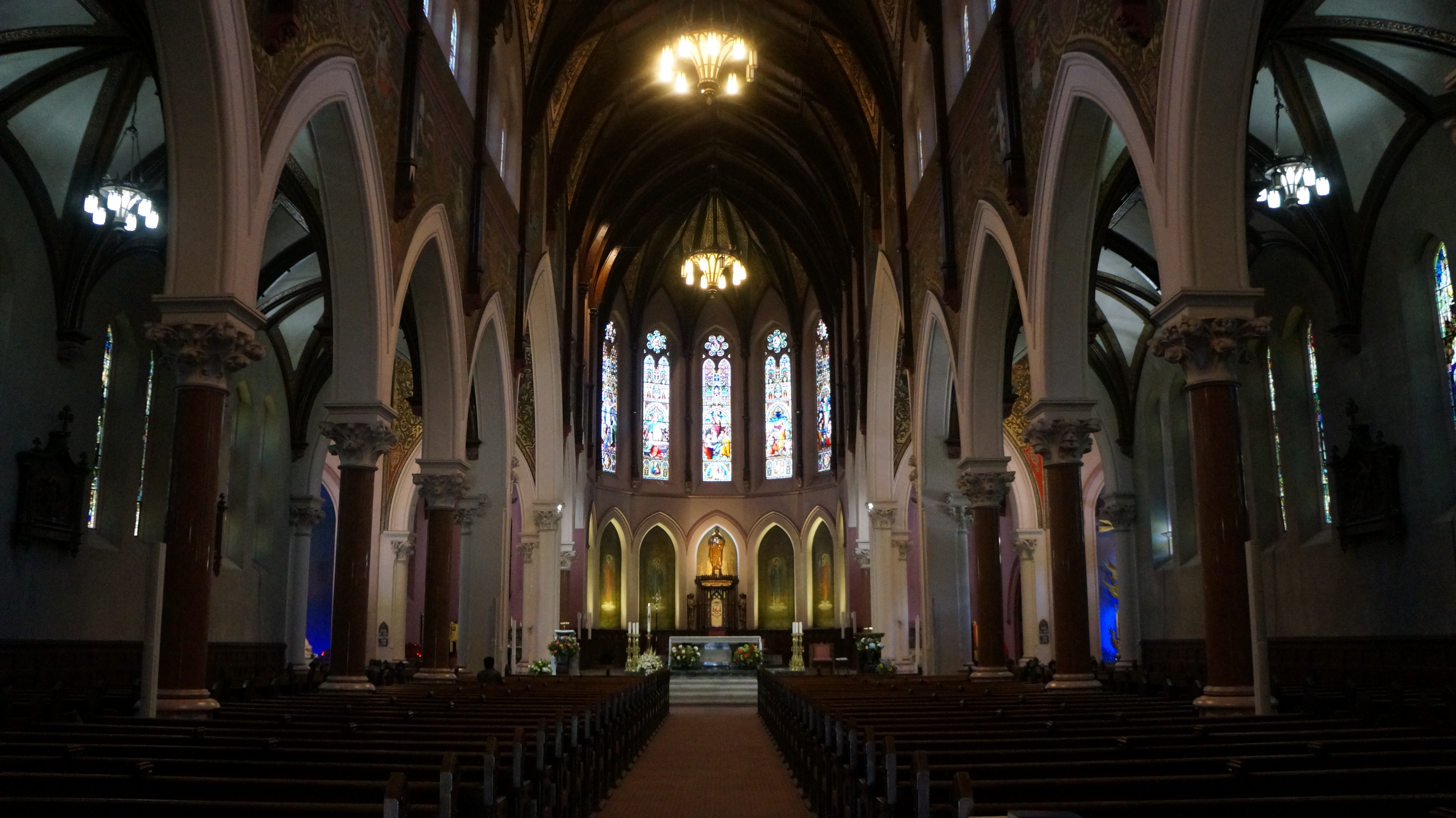
Interior

In 1968, the Cathedral Basilica's interior was renovated. The existing high altar and communion rails were removed, and a marble altar was installed. The cathedra was moved to the behind the altar. This renovation doubled the size of the sanctuary.

The current bishop of the Diocese of London is the Most Reverend Ronald Fabbro, CSB.

== See also ==
- List of churches in the Roman Catholic Diocese of London, Ontario
