= Michael Power (bishop) =

Catholic bishop

Servant of God Michael Power
- Bishop of Toronto
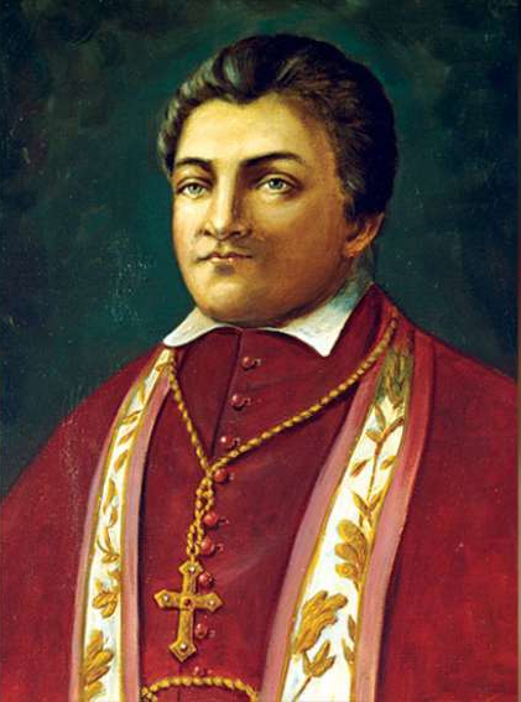
- Coloured version of a black and white portrait painted posthumously
- Church: Catholic Church
- Diocese: Toronto
- Appointed: December 17, 1841
- Installed: June 26, 1842
- Term ended: October 1, 1847
- Predecessor: none
- Successor: Armand-François-Marie de Charbonnel

Orders
- Ordination: August 19, 1827 by John Dubois
- Consecration: May 8, 1842 by Rémi Gaulin

Personal details
- Born: October 17, 1804 Halifax, British North America
- Died: October 1, 1847 (aged 42) Toronto, Province of Canada
- Buried: St. Michael's Cathedral Basilica
- Education: Saint-Sulpice Seminary (Montreal) and Seminary of Quebec

Michael Power (October 17, 1804 – October 1, 1847) was a Canadian Bishop who served as the first Roman Catholic Bishop of Toronto.

== Early years ==
Michael Power was born in Halifax, Nova Scotia, Canada to Captain William and Mary Roach Power, immigrants from Waterford, Ireland. At the age of twelve he was sent to the Seminary of St. Sulpice, Montreal and completed his training at the Seminary of Quebec. He was ordained a priest on August 19, 1827 in Montreal by Bishop John Dubois of New York. He served as a missionary priest of the Archdiocese of Québec and the Diocese of Montréal. Father Power was appointed pastor at Drummondville, where he remained until 1831 when he was sent as pastor to Montebello. From 1833 to 1839 he was pastor of Sainte-Martine, near Valleyfield. In 1839 he was appointed Vicar General of Montréal.

== First Bishop of Toronto ==
The diocese was created on December 17, 1841 out of the Diocese of Kingston. Father Power was appointed the first Bishop of the new See, and consecrated in 1842 in Laprairie, Quebec, by Bishop Rémi Gaulin of Kingston. Power was the first English-speaking Bishop to be born in Canada.

Bishop Power immediately drew up rules for the diocese, which were adopted by the clergy. During the course of his episcopate he had to cope with several unworthy clerics and did not hesitate to threaten and apply harsh punishment. In the autumn of 1842 he asked the general of the Jesuits for men to assume direction of the Indian missions in the western and northern parts of his diocese. They arrived the following July and established their base in Sandwich. Between 1843 and 1845, he visited the various areas of the diocese. In 1844, Power and other Canadian bishops successfully petition the Pope for the creation of an ecclesiastical province in Canada. The dioceses of Quebec, Montreal, Kingston and Toronto were united under the metropolitan province of Quebec, and Quebec became the Archdiocese.

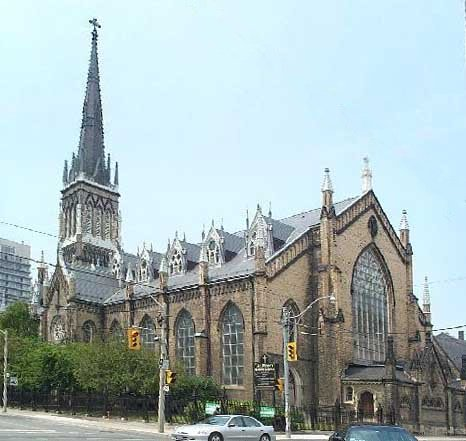
St. Michaels, Toronto

On May 8, 1845, Bishop Power laid the cornerstone for St. Michael's Cathedral.

In January 1847 Power left on a six-month visit to Europe, seeking to recruit additional priests and to raise money for his cathedral. While in Ireland he arranged for the Sisters of Loreto to establish a mission in Toronto. He also witnessed the famine that was driving unprecedented numbers of Irish to emigrate.

== Death ==
More than 90,000 landed at Quebec in 1847 to escape the Great Famine. Typhus was rife among them and spread to the Canadian towns, including Toronto. Power contracted the disease while administering the Last Sacraments and caring for the victims of typhus and succumbed to it on 1 October 1847. He was 42 years of age. Power's remains are buried in a crypt beneath St. Michael's Cathedral.

== Legacy ==
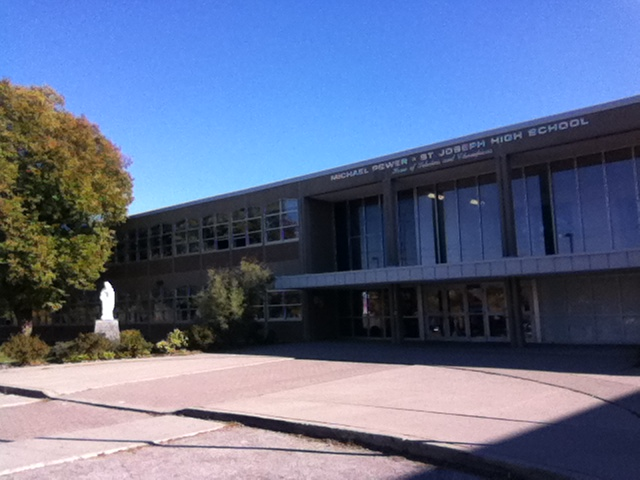
Michael Power High School, founded in 1957, named after him.

A sculpture of Bishop Power, created by John Cochrane, is located at the main entrance the archbishop's residence in Toronto.

Bishop Power's most notable achievements were the building of St. Michael's Cathedral, Toronto and the Bishop's Palace on Church Street.

Bishop Michael Power as portrayed in the film Death or Canada

In 2005, Mark G. McGowan wrote a book called, Michael Power: The Struggle to Build the Catholic Church on the Canadian Frontier.

In 2009, Bishop Power was featured prominently in the docudrama Death or Canada, which tells the story of the Irish Famine and its impact on Toronto in 1847. Power is portrayed as the hero of Toronto and is described as a "martyr of charity." A contributor to the film, Mark G. McGowan also wrote a book, Death or Canada: The Irish Famine Migration to Toronto, 1847.

A high school in Toronto, Michael Power High School, was founded in 1957 by the Basilian Fathers initially known as St. Francis High School and later Bishop Power High School.

Catholic Church titles
Preceded by	Bishop of Toronto; 1841–1847	Succeeded by Armand-François-Marie de Charbonnel
