= John Michael Sherlock =

Canadian Roman Catholic bishop (1926–2019)

The Most Reverend John Michael Sherlock
- Bishop of London
- Province: Ontario
- Diocese: Diocese of London
- Installed: 7 July 1978
- Term ended: 27 April 2002
- Predecessor: Gerald Emmett Carter
- Successor: Ronald Peter Fabbro
- Previous posts: Auxiliary Bishop of London, Ontario (1974-1978); Titular Bishop of Macriana in Mauretania (1974-1978)

Orders
- Ordination: 3 June 1950
- Consecration: 28 August 1974 by Paul Francis Reding

Personal details
- Born: 20 January 1926 Regina, Saskatchewan
- Died: 12 August 2019 (aged 93) London, Ontario

Ordination history of John Michael Sherlock
History
Priestly ordination
- Date: 3 June 1950
Episcopal consecration
- Principal consecrator: Paul Francis Reding
- Co-consecrators: Philip Francis Pocock, Joseph Francis Ryan
- Date: 28 August 1974
Episcopal succession
Bishops consecrated by John Michael Sherlock as principal consecrator
- Marcel André J. Gervais: 11 June 1980
- Frederick Bernard Henry: 24 June 1986
- Donald Thériault: 1 June 1998
- Ronald Peter Fabbro: 15 August 2002

John Michael Sherlock (January 20, 1926 – August 12, 2019) was a Canadian bishop. He was the Roman Catholic Bishop of London, Ontario, from July 8, 1978, to April 27, 2002. He was born in Regina, Saskatchewan, and raised in Brantford, Ontario. Second eldest of a family of eight, four of his five brothers also studied at the seminary. Two of them, Fr William Sherlock and Fr Philip Sherlock, were ordained priests.

Sherlock was ordained in 1950. He became the head of the Diocese of London in 1978 - a district that includes over 130 parishes from Windsor to Huron County, with approximately 440,000 parishioners. Sherlock's tenure was riddled with clergy sexual abuse scandals, which shone a harsh spotlight on the prevalence of historical sexual abuse within the Diocese of London.

Styles of John Michael Sherlock
- Reference style: His Excellency
- Spoken style: Your Excellency
- Religious style: Bishop

== Timeline ==
- January 20, 1926: Born in Regina, Saskatchewan
- June 3, 1950: Ordained priest for Diocese of Hamilton, Ontario, Canada
- June 25, 1974: Appointed Titular Bishop of Macriana in Mauretania and Auxiliary Bishop of London, Ontario, Canada
- August 28, 1974: Consecrated Titular Bishop of Macriana in Mauretania
- July 7, 1978: Appointed Bishop of London, Ontario, Canada
- August 21, 1978: Installed as Bishop of London, Ontario, Canada
- April 27, 2002: Bishop Emeritus of London, Ontario, Canada

== See also ==
- Diocese of Hamilton, Ontario

Catholic Church titles
Preceded by	Bishop Emeritus of London; 2002–2019	Succeeded by
Preceded by Gerald Emmett Carter	Bishop of London; 1978–2002	Succeeded by Ronald Peter Fabbro
Preceded by Gerald Emmett Carter	Auxiliary Bishop of London; 1974–1978	Succeeded by Marcel André J. Gervais
Preceded by Francis Frederick Reh	Titular Bishop of Macriana in Mauretania; 1974–1978	Succeeded by Francisco María Aguilera González
