= Ronald Peter Fabbro =

Canadian Roman-Catholic bishop

His Excellency, The Most Reverend Ronald Peter Fabbro C.S.B.
- Bishop of London
- Province: Ontario
- Diocese: Diocese of London
- Appointed: 27 April 2002
- Installed: 15 August 2002
- Term ended: 21 April 2026
- Predecessor: John Michael Sherlock

Orders
- Ordination: 3 May 1980
- Consecration: 15 August 2002 by John Michael Sherlock

Personal details
- Born: 6 November 1950 (age 76) Sudbury, Ontario
- Denomination: Roman Catholic
- Education: Queen's University
- Motto: Secumdum Verbum Tuum Doce Me (English: Teach me according to your word) Psalms 119:169.
- Coat of arms: Ronald Peter Fabbro's coat of arms

Styles of Ronald Peter Fabbro, C.S.B.
- Reference style: His Excellency; The Most Reverend
- Spoken style: Your Excellency
- Religious style: Bishop

Ordination history of Ronald Peter Fabbro
History
Episcopal consecration
- Principal consecrator: John Michael Sherlock
- Co-consecrators: Richard John Grecco, Ricardo Ramírez, C.S.B.
Episcopal succession
Bishops consecrated by Ronald Peter Fabbro as principal consecrator
- Robert Anthony Daniels: 9 November 2004
- William Terrence McGrattan: 12 January 2010

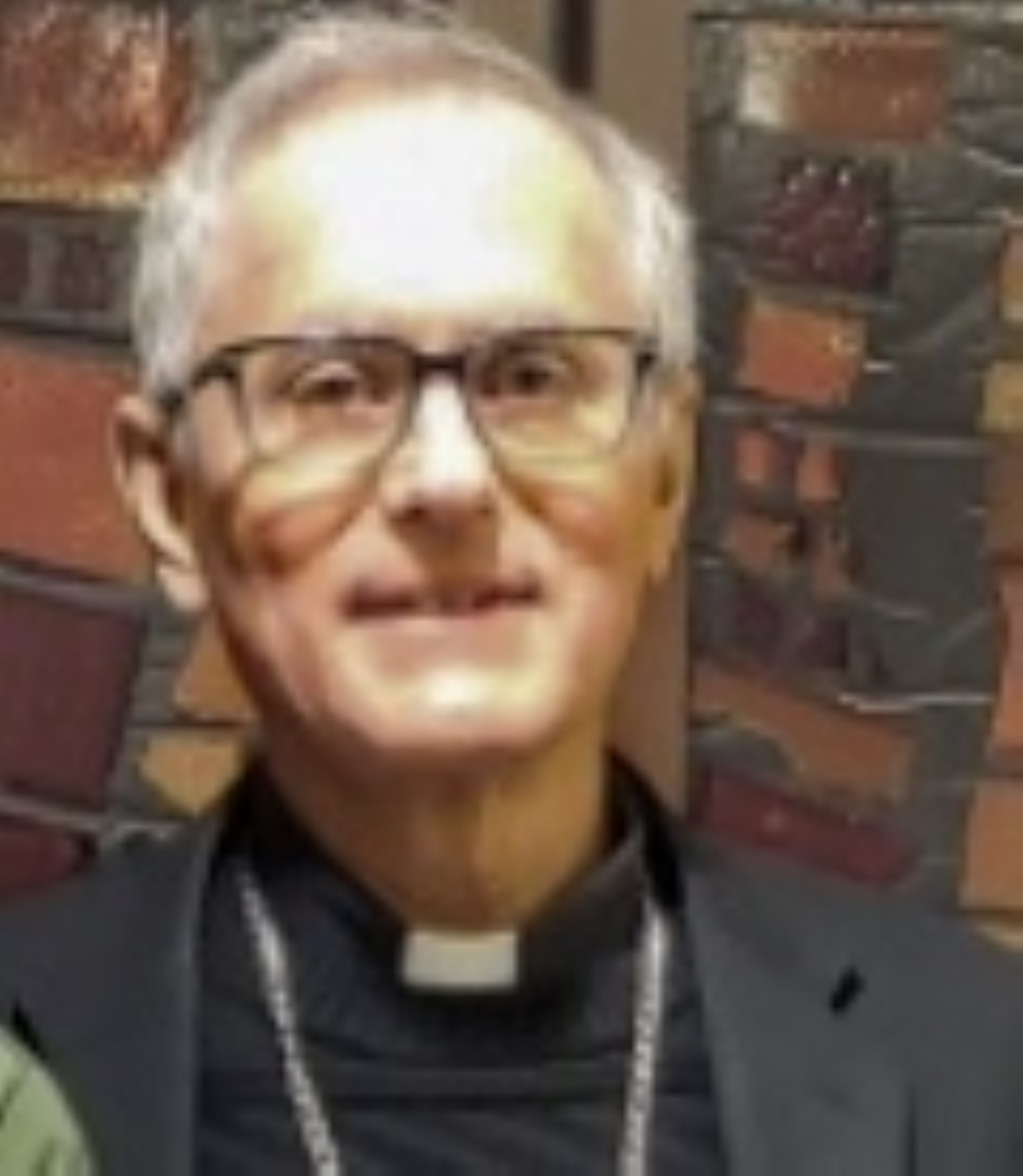
Bishop Fabbro After 4:30 Mass on Saturday Nov 25, 2023 at St. Anne's Church, the feast of Christ the King of the Universe.

Ronald Peter Fabbro, C.S.B. (born 6 November 1950) is a Canadian prelate, who was the Roman Catholic Bishop of London, Ontario, Canada. He was born in Sudbury, Ontario, and was educated at St. Charles College and Queen's University.

Fabbro was the principal consecrator of Bishop Robert Anthony Daniels and Bishop William McGrattan, as well as a principal co-consecrator of Archbishop John Michael Miller.

== Timeline ==
- 6 Nov 1950, born in Sudbury, Ontario
- 15 Aug 1975, professed as a member of the Congregation of St. Basil
- 3 May 1980, ordained priest of the Congregation of St. Basil
- 27 Apr 2002, appointed Bishop of London, Ontario, Canada
- 15 Aug 2002, consecrated Bishop of London, Ontario, Canada

== Handling of Sexual Abuse Scandal in the Diocese of London ==
In September 2018, Bishop Fabbro released a statement stating that the "extent of the abuse is shocking". He admitted that the "cover up" of sexual abuse by Roman Catholic dioceses was "terribly wrong". The statement was released in response to the media attention given to the Pennsylvania Grand Jury Report that involved an investigation of clergy sexual abuse.

In 2019, the Survivor's Network of those Abused by Priests (SNAP) confirmed that 36 priests were credibly accused of sexually abusing minors. Following media coverage of the list, the Diocese waived confidentiality of their previous settlements. When interviewed about the list compiled by SNAP, Bishop Fabbro indicated that the list was "substantially correct". He added that four other priests whose names were not on the list were accused of sexual abuse of minors.

In November 2019, Bishop Fabbro attended a screening of a documentary on clergy sexual abuse at the invitation of a survivor of clergy sexual abuse.

== See also ==
- Congregation of St. Basil

Religious titles
Preceded by John Michael Sherlock	Bishop of London; 2002 – 2026	Succeeded by Daniel Miehm
