= Daniel Miehm =

Current Catholic Bishop of London, Ontario

His Excellency, The Most Reverend Daniel Miehm
- Apostolic Administrator of Peterborough; Bishop of London
- Diocese: Peterborough
- Appointed: March 10, 2017
- Installed: April 19, 2017
- Predecessor: William McGrattan
- Previous posts: Auxiliary Bishop of Hamilton (2013-2017); Titular Bishop of Gor (2013-2017)

Orders
- Ordination: May 6, 1989 by Anthony F. Tonnos
- Consecration: May 7, 2013 by Douglas Crosby, Anthony F. Tonnos, and Richard William Smith

Personal details
- Born: August 27, 1960 (age 66) Kitchener, Ontario, Canada
- Motto: Fides Per Caritatem (Faith Through Love)

Styles of Daniel Miehm
- Reference style: His Excellency; The Most Reverend
- Spoken style: Your Excellency
- Religious style: Bishop

Daniel J. Miehm (born August 27, 1960, in Kitchener, Ontario) is the Bishop of the Diocese of London, Ontario. He was appointed as the 11th Bishop of London by Pope Leo XIV on April 21, 2026 and installed on June 29, 2026.

== Biography ==
=== Early life ===
Bishop Miehm's parents first met when they were both members of the Legion of Mary.

=== Priesthood ===
Bishop Miehm studied philosophy at St. Jerome's University in Waterloo, Ontario. He later attended St. Augustine's Seminary in Toronto and was ordained for the Diocese of Hamilton on May 6, 1989. Bishop Miehm later obtained a licentiate in canon law from the Pontifical University of Saint Thomas Aquinas in Rome.

Bishop Miehm was the Founding Pastor of Saint Benedict Parish in Milton, serving there from 2012 to 2013.

=== Episcopacy ===
On February 20, 2013, Bishop Miehm was appointed as an auxiliary bishop of the Diocese of Hamilton and titular bishop of Gor.

In March of 2017, Bishop Miehm was appointed as Bishop of Peterborough by Pope Francis. He was installed on April 19, 2017.

On April 21, 2026, Bishop Miehm was appointed as the 11th Bishop of London, Ontario.
