= St. Michael's Cathedral Basilica =

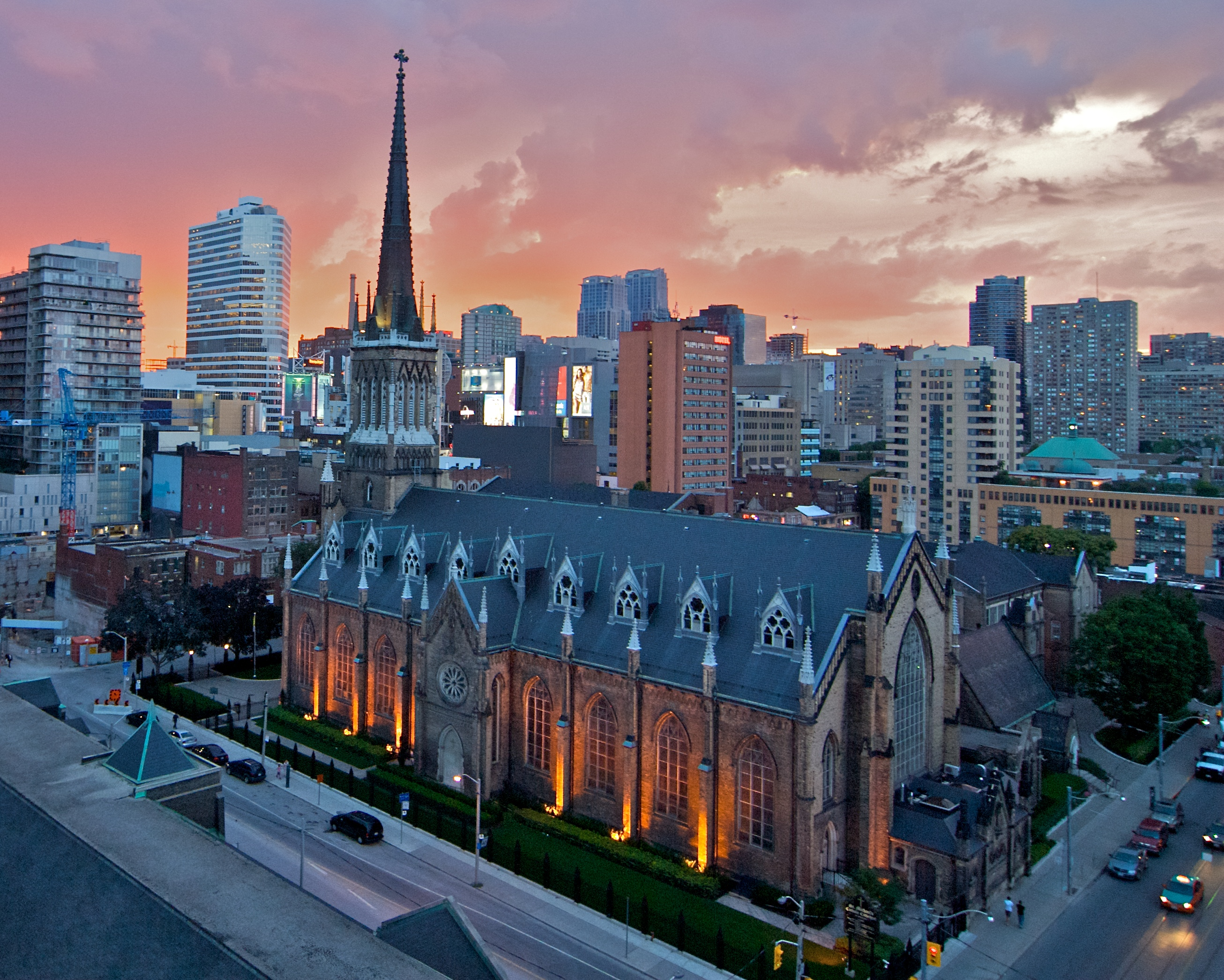
- Exterior view from the southeast

- Location in Toronto Location in Ontario
- 43.655°N 79.377°W
- Location: 65 Bond Street; Toronto, Ontario
- Country: Canada
- Denomination: Roman Catholic
- Website: stmichaelscathedral.com

History
- Former name: St. Michael's Cathedral
- Status: Cathedral, minor basilica
- Founder: Michael Power
- Dedication: St. Michael the Archangel
- Dedicated: August 29, 1848
- Consecrated: September 29, 1848

Architecture
- Functional status: Active
- Architect: William Thomas
- Style: English Gothic/Gothic Revival
- Groundbreaking: April 7, 1845

Administration
- Archdiocese: Toronto

Clergy
- Archbishop: Frank Cardinal Leo
- Rector: Edwin Gonsalves
- Priests: Kevin Adriano; Francis Lai, CSJB

St. Michael's Cathedral Basilica is the cathedral church of the Roman Catholic Archdiocese of Toronto, Canada, and one of the oldest churches in Toronto. It is located at 65 Bond Street in Toronto's Garden District. St. Michael's was designed by William Thomas, designer of eight other churches in the city, and was primarily financed by Irish immigrants who resided in the area. The cathedral has a capacity of 1600. John Cochrane and Brothers undertook the work on the stone and stucco ornamentation of the interior.

St. Michael's Cathedral is a major building of faith in downtown Toronto. It was originally constructed away from the city's centre, but over time the city has grown to encompass it. It was constructed to better serve the growing Roman Catholic population of Toronto. It is a prime example of the English Gothic Revival style of architecture. On September 29, 2016, the feast day of Saint Michael the Archangel, the cathedral was elevated to a minor basilica.

== Archdiocese ==
The cathedral is home to Canada's largest English-speaking Catholic archdiocese. The current archbishop is Cardinal Frank Leo, appointed by Pope Francis on 11 February 2023. In addition to worship services, the church sponsors a number of outreach programs for nearby residents.

== History ==
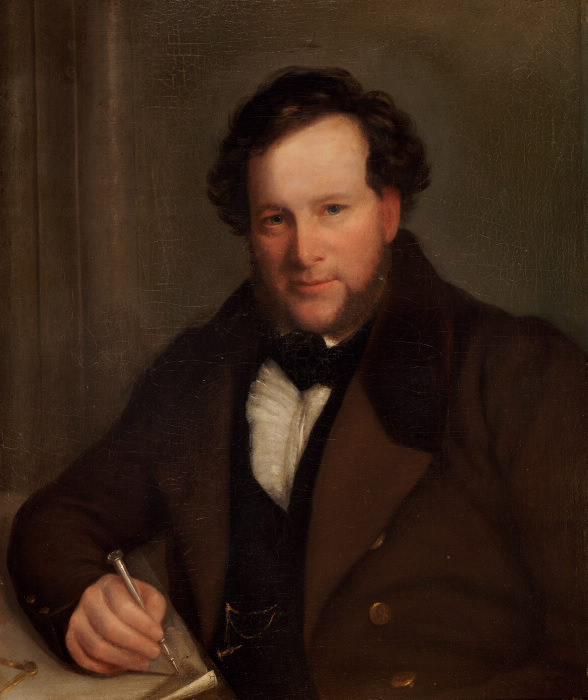
The original designs for St. Michael's were created by William Thomas.

On April 7, 1845, construction began on St. Michael's Cathedral and the Bishop's Palace, a three-story rectory adjacent to the Neo-Gothic cathedral. Both buildings were designed by William Thomas. Townspeople dug out the foundation by hand in return for a barbecue. Shipwrights made the interior columns out of maple and oak. On May 8, 1845, Bishop Power laid the cornerstone for the cathedral in the four-year-old diocese. Some fragments of a stone pillar from the old Norman-style York Minster Cathedral in England and some small pieces of the oak roof of that same cathedral were sealed within St. Michael's cornerstone. St. Michael's is a 19th-century interpretation of the Minster's 14th century English Gothic style. The connection with York Minster is appropriate, since Toronto was known as the town of York from its settlement in 1793 until it was incorporated in 1834 and the name was changed back.

Bishop Power died on October 1, 1847, having contracted typhus while tending to his flock. His funeral was held at St. Paul's, and he was buried in the crypt of the unfinished St. Michael's Cathedral. Also buried in the crypt is a man who fell from the roof during construction.

The cathedral was dedicated on August 29, 1848, to St. Michael the Archangel. On September 29, 1848, the cathedral was consecrated after substantial work by the Honourable John Elmsley and his friend Samuel G. Lynn to reduce the debt. The 79-meter bell tower, which contains two bells, was consecrated in 1866.

The cathedral played an instrumental role in the founding of nearby St. Michael's Hospital when the Sisters of Saint Joseph, who came to Toronto at the request of Bishop Charbonnel to operate an orphanage and settlement house, responded to the need for care during a diphtheria epidemic in 1892.

An Ontario Heritage Trust marker at the church notes its importance in the city's history. An additional plaque was installed on March 28, 1982, by the Archdiocese of Toronto at the rectory.

Between 1852 and 1856, the rectory was home to St. Michael's College until it moved to its present location near the University of Toronto. St. Michael's College School, an all-boys school in the Toronto neighbourhood of Forest Hill, was previously the high school section of the original college.

The choir was started in 1926, and the original parish school founded in 1900 evolved into the present-day choir school. The choirboys from the school have presented a Christmas concert at the cathedral every year since 1939. The school continues to operate jointly under authority of the Pontifical Institute of Sacred Music and the Toronto Catholic District School Board.

== Architectural style ==
St. Michael's Cathedral is built in the Gothic revival style. Since it was originally constructed by William Thomas from 1845 to 1848, the building has undergone several renovations. These are the Bishop's Palace additions by Joseph Sheard in 1852, the completion of the tower and spire by firm Gundry & Langley from 1865 to 1867, and the addition of dormers by Joseph Connolly in 1890. The interior of the church, divided into a large nave and two tall aisles, is lavishly decorated. The tall arcade, supported by graceful colonnettes, gives the interior space a feeling of openness and adds to the grand sense of scale that the building imposes.

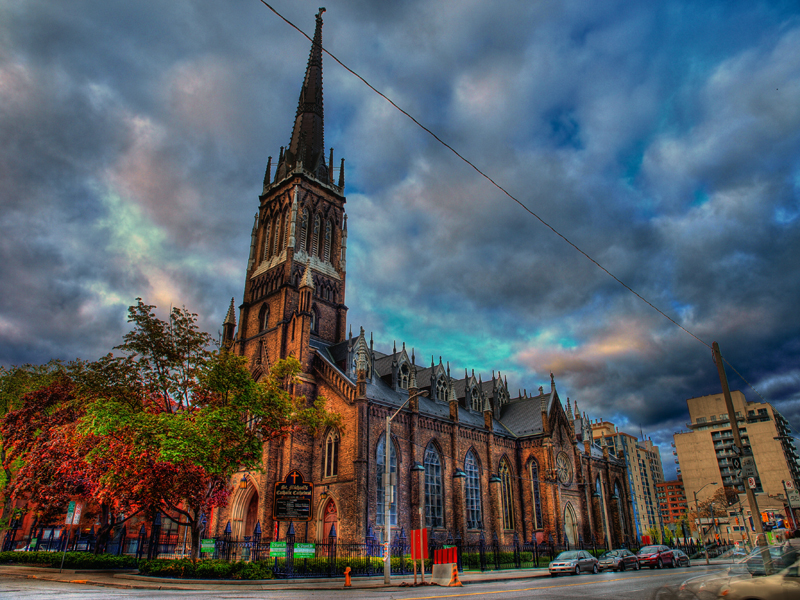
St. Michael's Cathedral Basilica in 2008.

St. Michael's Cathedral is located to the northwest of Church and Shuter streets in Toronto, with the parish office at 200 Church Street. The building is oriented on an off-east–west axis aligned perpendicular to Church Street, with the main entrance on its west side located at 65 Bond Street. In adherence with the tradition of medieval churches, the cathedral's high altar is in the east end of the building, facing Jerusalem. The general composition of the building resembles that of a 13th or 14th century Gothic cathedral; however, the design is simplified and does not contain elements such as flying buttresses, transepts, or ribbed vaults. Also, because there are no transepts, the cathedral itself does not assume the typical cruciform shape of most medieval Gothic cathedrals. Conversely, the secondary altars, or side-chapels, divide the cathedral in two down its length, providing a slight outcrop visible from the exterior. The building can be further subdivided down its length by the nine bays framed by the buttresses on the exterior of the building.

The cathedral's tower supports a large iron spire located over its west entrance. At its tallest point, the tower reaches 260 feet (79 m) or approximately 26 stories above the ground, surpassing the height of many of the surrounding buildings. The scale of the cathedral is quite large within the context of its immediate surroundings; however, when examined in context with the surrounding office towers, the size of the cathedral shrinks considerably. From the exterior, the building maintains a distinctly Gothic appearance characterized by its pointed arches, buttressed walls, stone moulding and sharp iron accents. The building is set back considerably from the street and features a tall iron fence around its perimeter, which further contributes to the building's sharp appearance. The fence allows the building to maintain a semi-private front yard, featuring a stone-paved roundabout on its west side and a garden along its south side. Access from the east side of the building is limited due to the connection with the cathedral's rectory.

=== Exterior ===
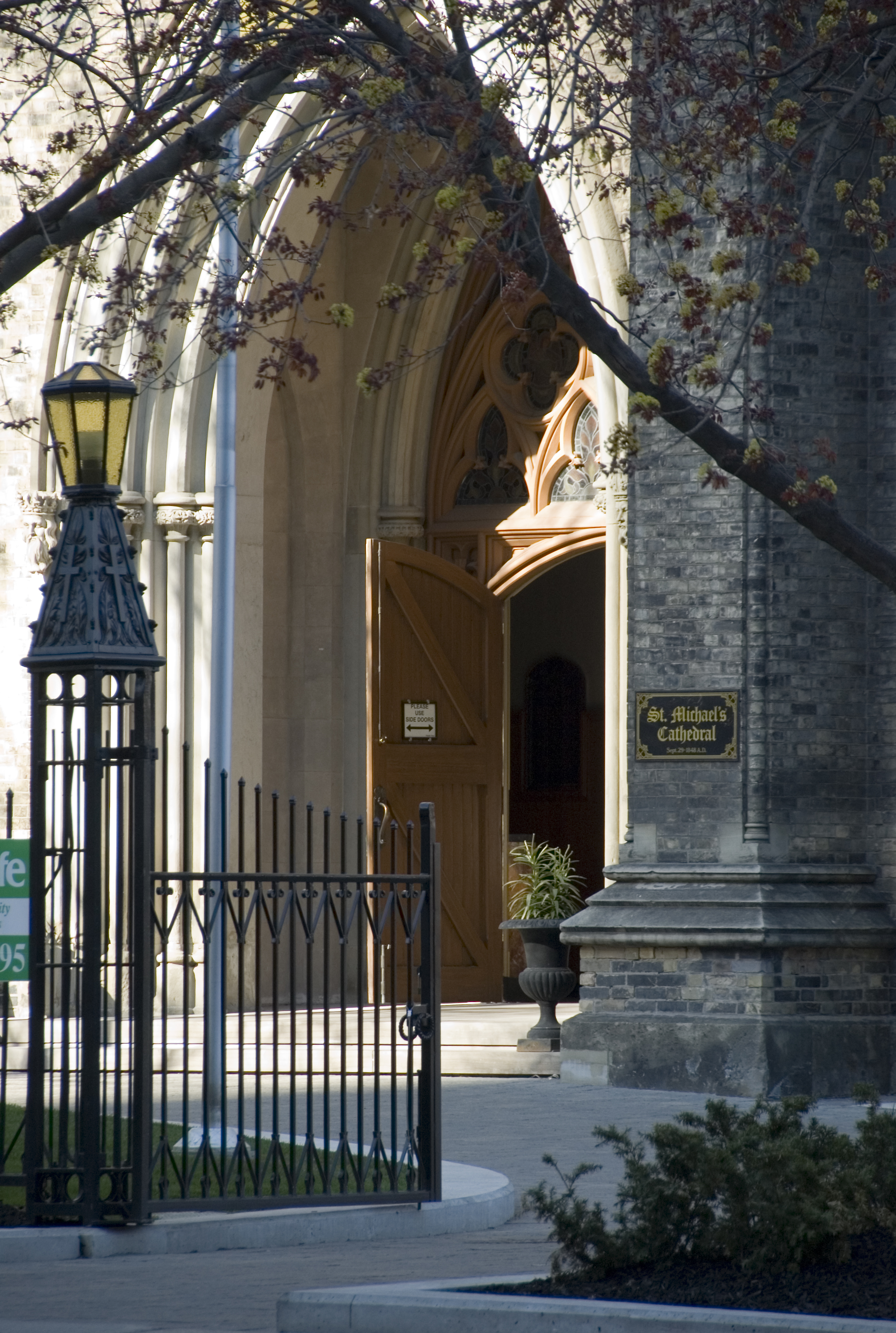
Western entrance to St. Michael's Cathedral Basilica

The exterior façade of the church is a cream-coloured brick with stone accents. The exterior has a neutral colour scheme, which contrasts the beauty of the interior. Teal-coloured shingles contrast gently with the cream exterior walls. In regards to shape, all of the façades vary considerably. The western façade houses the main entrance and pinnacle tower, and is arguably the most impressive side of the church. It faces Bond Street, with the building set back from the property line to create a small forecourt. The spire reaches a height of 260 feet. Much of the northern façade is hidden by the rectory and St. Michael's Choir School's main building. What little can be seen is spoiled by the protruding fire escape exit. The eastern façade, while not as impressive as the western façade, is, arguably, the most varied. A second school building occupies a site on the west side of Bond Street.

Typical characteristics structures of Gothic Architecture include pointed arches called 'ogivals', flying buttresses, transverse arms, clerestory windows, pinnacles, and ribbed vaults, many of which are displayed in St. Michael's Cathedral.

St. Michael's is a good example of a basilica, being a large, rectilinear space with a longitudinal axis. The church runs along an east–west axis, with an extruded portion running north–south, but not nearly as big as the main roof axis. The main axis is represented by the sloped roofs meeting together at the exact middle of the church. All axes are either parallel or perpendicular to each other, so the exterior of church has a very linear and symmetrical feel.

=== Interior ===
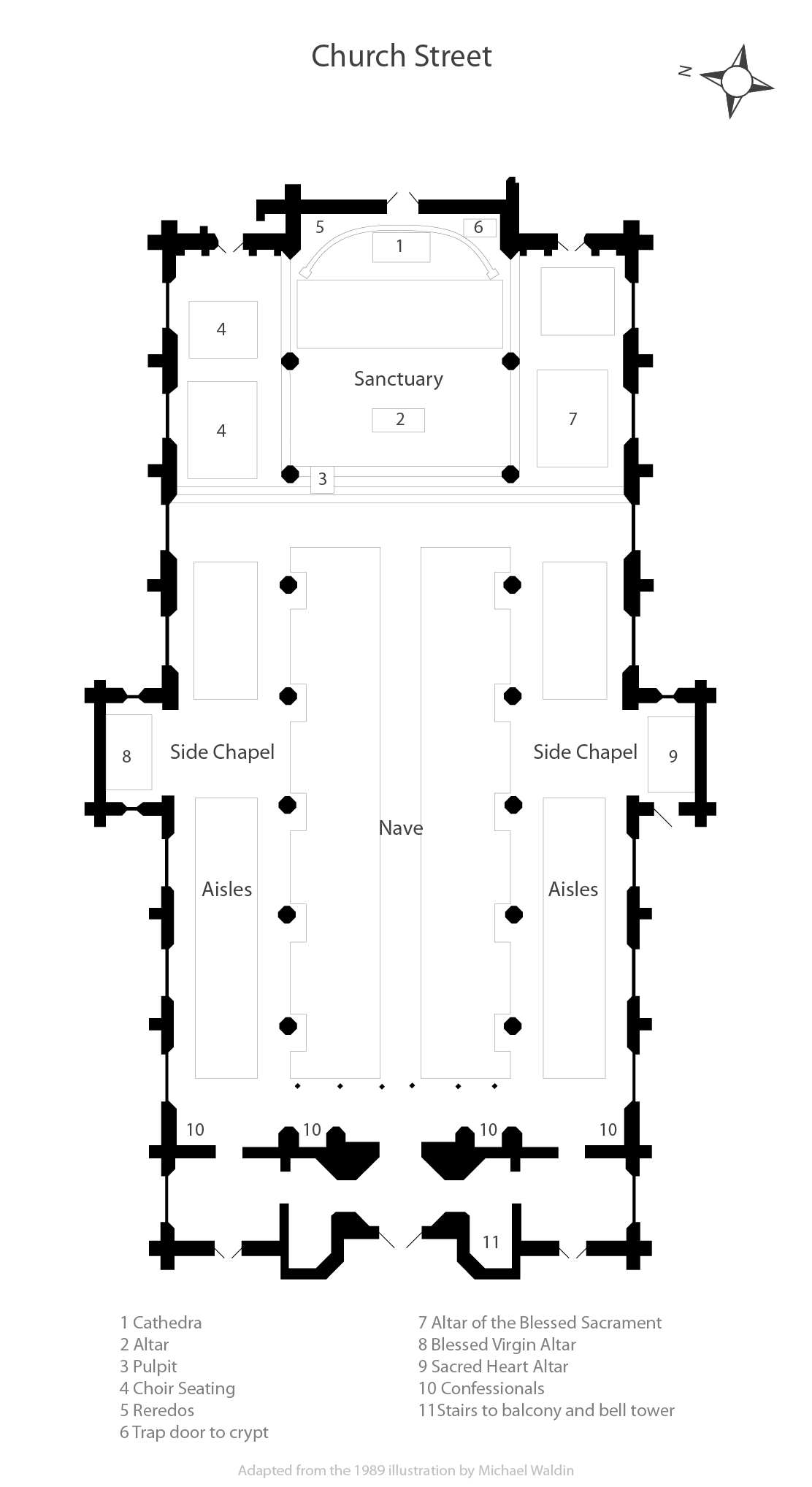
The floor plan for St. Michael's Cathedral Basilica prior to the 2016 restoration

On the inside, the centre aisle along the main axis between the pews used for formal processions dominates. It is also used by parishioners taking their seats and going up for communion. The interior of the cathedral is laid out to create 5 designated spaces: a foyer (the narthex), the balcony, central aisle, left aisle and right aisle. When entering the church, the narthex creates a space that separates the public space from the sacred space. Marble stoups that contain holy water are located to the sides of the doors. Downstairs, there are the Crypt Chapel and Gift Store.

Three sets of double-doors mirroring the front entrances allow guests into the cathedral. When entering the sacred space of the cathedral, its mass is arranged linearly based on a vertical axis, with two main arcades of stone. The two main arcades consists of ivory piers with patterned spandrels of blue and red, however, string courses outline the decorated triforium. The first three piers closest to the altar are topped with red abacuses to define the sacred space. The left and right aisles begin with ribbed vaults and then transition into an exposed beam ceiling. The interior walls are painted grey stone over plaster. The walls are lined with wall arcades. Facing the aisles, an etching of a Gothic window profile is encrusted on each of the wooden benches. At the back of the cathedral are lacquered wooden sculptures. In the back corners of the cathedral there are four wooden confessionals mimicking the arcade arches. The panels of the confessional are decorated with crosses.

Sixteen cast-iron lanterns hang from the tall aisles that light up the cathedral. About midway down the aisles, there are two small chapels; the Blessed Virgin chapel on the north behind the baptismal font, and the Sacred Heart chapel on the south, decorated with small colourful stone tiles. Lit candles flickering in red and blue illuminate the sides of the church. Classic artwork like The Last Supper, as well as other religious paintings of Jesus, priests, and John the Baptist hang above the sanctuary. These paintings, murals and vignettes were done in the 1930s.

Various sculptures of saints sit along the side aisles in front of the stained glass windows. The St. Michael's church choir sit on the right side of the altar. Behind the altar is a semi-circular oak reredos with one large episcopal chair of the Archbishop and six smaller chairs on either side for members of the clergy.

=== Stained-glass windows ===
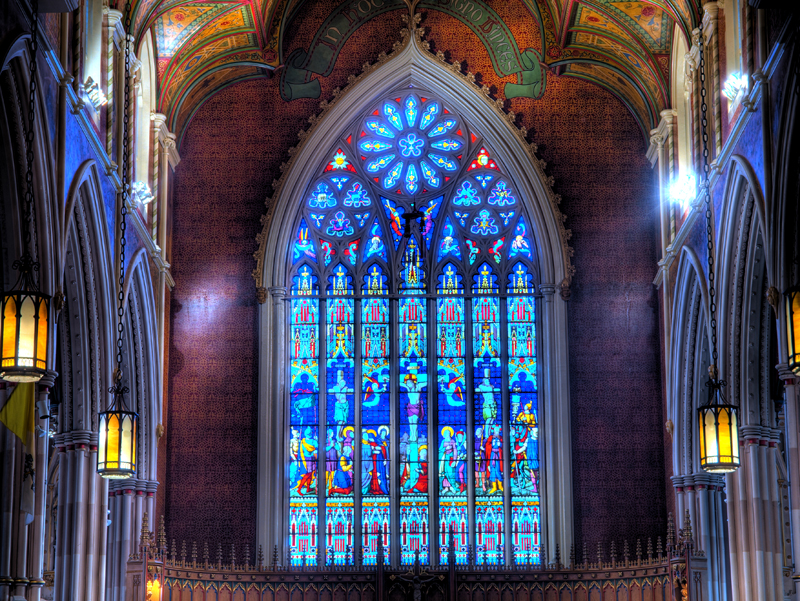
Stained-glass window above the sanctuary of the cathedral depicting the crucifixion, one of three stained-glass windows in the church

Unlike many of the cathedrals constructed during the Gothic Revival Period, St. Michael's retains a rich and colourful interior characteristic of classic Gothic cathedrals. The stained-glass in the cathedral is of the "antique" variety, which is hand-blown in typical medieval style resulting in deeper colour when compared to typical machine-rolled glass used in other churches at the time. The largest piece of stained glass, located on the east side of the building was imported from France in 1858 and created by Étienne Thévenot, the same artist who created some of the windows for Notre-Dame and various other churches in Paris. The stained-glass windows located on the north and south walls originate from Austria and Bavaria and were installed during the late 1800s and early 1900s replacing the original clear pane. Despite the intentional Gothic style evident in many of the designs of these windows they are actually late-baroque in style.

The eastern stained glass window above the altar, the focus of the church's interior is the stained glass window of the crucifixion. The tableau was installed in 1858 by Étienne Thévenot, a French pioneer of the medieval glass revival. Blue, yellow and red are the most prominent colours in the window. The deep blue sky with small blood-red squares of glass leading in the regular grid fall into larger and smaller bands of maroon, plum, and purple enlivened by emerald, viridian and gold. The central panel of the oculus is a depiction of the Blessed Sacrament symbolizing the resurrection of Jesus Christ. Underneath the stained glass window is an intricate wooden reredos with gold and green detailing.

=== Restorations ===
The exterior of the cathedral has remained relatively unchanged over the last 100 years. In 1864, the Toronto firm Gundry and Langley added an enlarged sacristy to the cathedral. In 1866, the same firm was also responsible for the addition of the tower and spire which adorns the west entrance of the cathedral.

The interior of the basilica, largely the work of John Cochrane and Brothers, in 2017

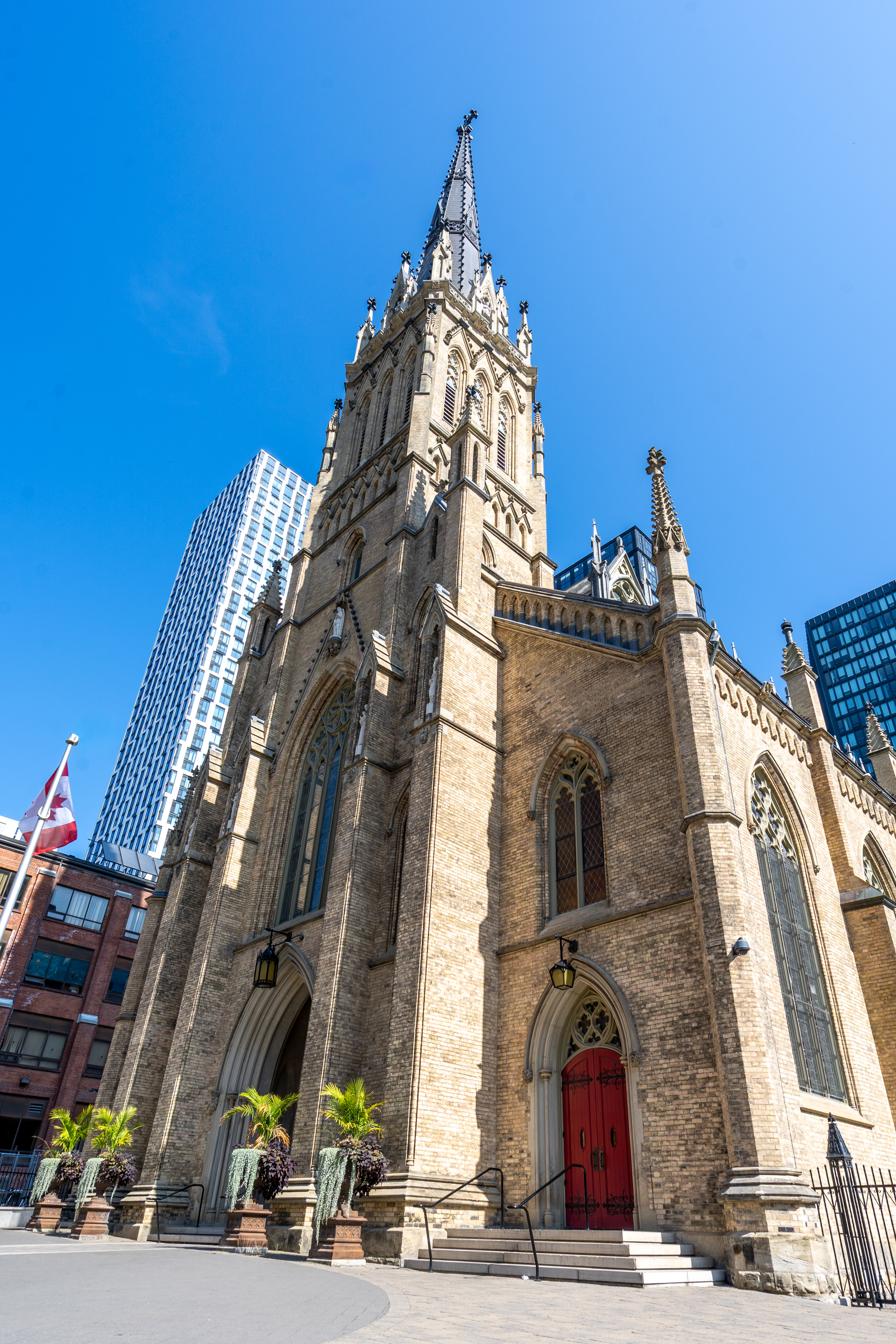
Exterior in 2025

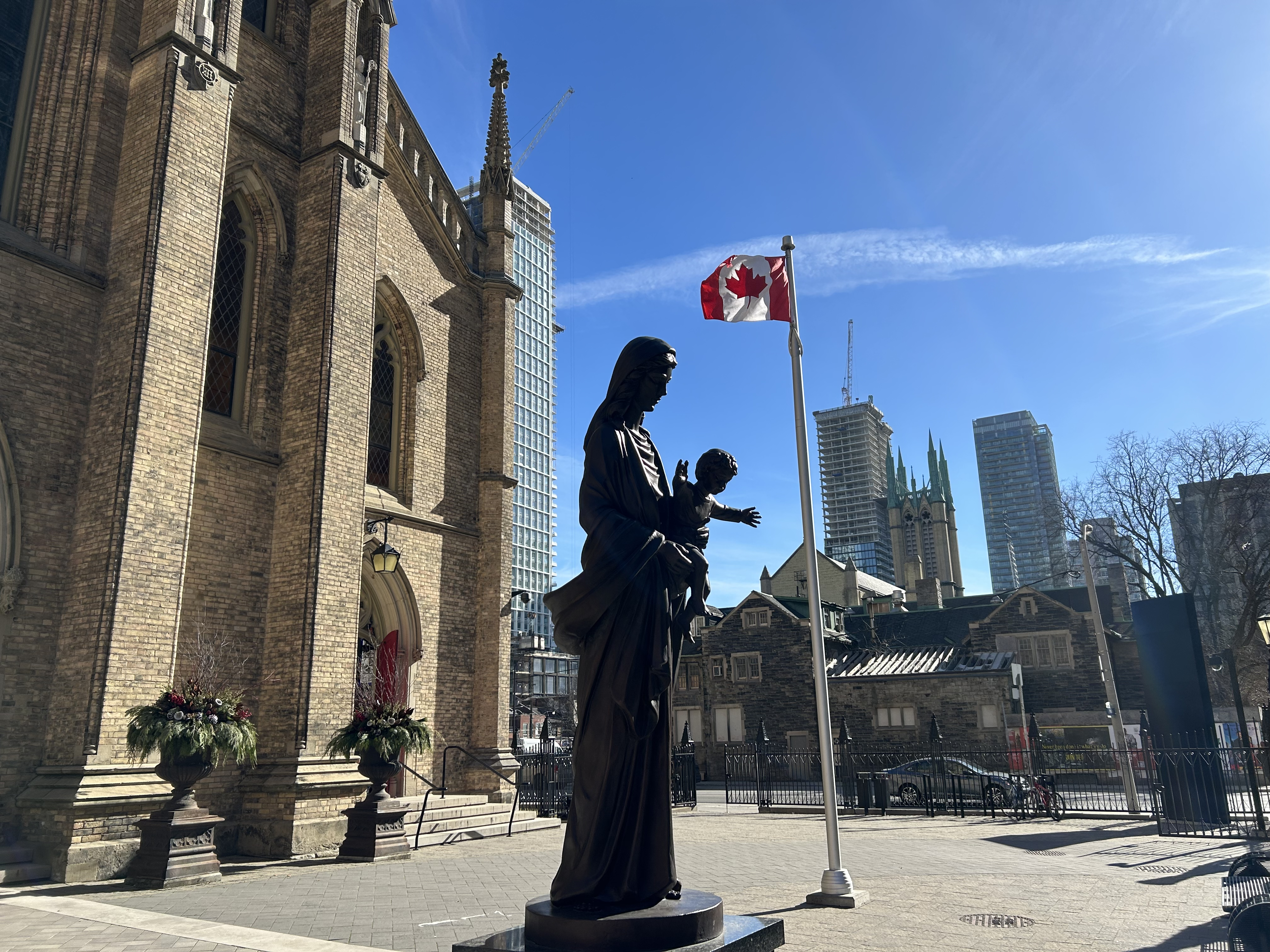
The Virgin Mary and the Canadian flag

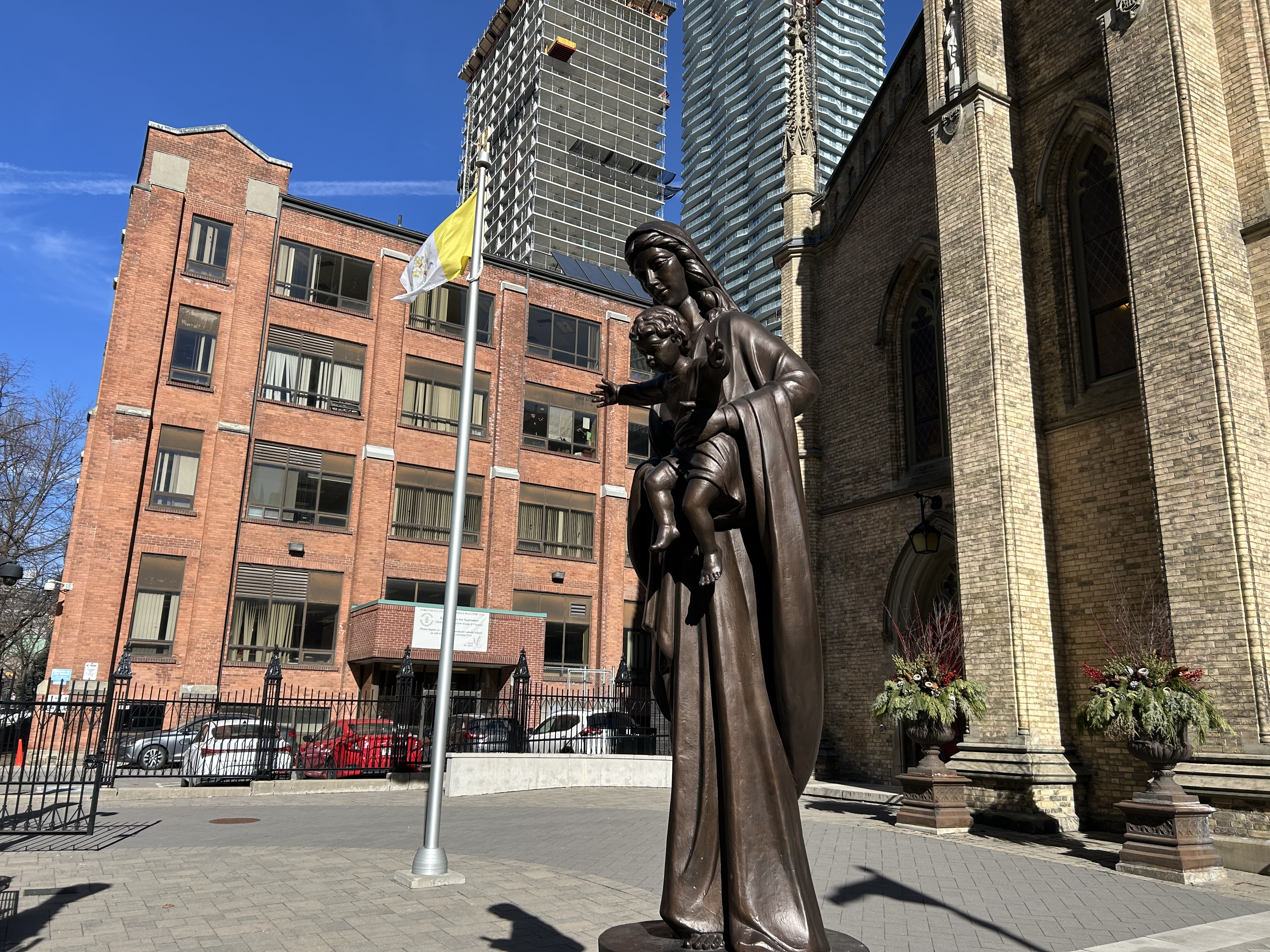
The Virgin Mary and the Vatican flag

In 1880, the current three-manual pipe organ was installed in the cathedral's gallery by Archbishop Joseph Lynch. The dormered windows located on the roof were added some time in the 1890s with the intent to improve the cathedral's appearance; it is believed that architect Joseph Connolly was responsible for their design. The interior of the building has remained the same in terms of its plan; however, since the Second Vatican Council, the original high altar was dismantled and used to create a new tabernacle shrine, now located to the south of the sanctuary, while a new table altar was placed in the centre of the sanctuary. Most of the present paintings that adorn the roof and walls of the cathedral date to 1937, with several smaller ones having been added since, the most recent in 1982.

To the right of the altar, there is a wooden monument for the Blessed Sacrament that is the result of a re-design of 1980 directed by Gerald Emmett Cardinal Carter. In 2011, restorations took place that included the west facade being cleaned, bringing the bricks back to their original yellow colour.

In June 2015, the archdiocese announced that the 168-year-old cathedral would close for next nine months to deal with safety concerns over a long-running restoration process. St. Paul's Basilica planned to add three weekend Masses to accommodate parishioners from St. Michael's. The cathedral was slated to open briefly in December 2015 for Christmas masses before closing again until March 2016.

Concrete pillars replaced existing ones after it was discovered that mortar was failing.

The original pipe organ and the balcony which supported it were replaced with a new balcony constructed which supports a new pipe organ and additional seating for 250 more parishioners. In August 2015, emergency crews had to retrieve a woman who had climbed the exterior scaffolding.

On December 8, 2015, the archdiocese hosted an open house to showcase the work done this far on the restoration. It was rededicated on the Feast of St. Michael, Thursday September 29, 2016, by Thomas Cardinal Collins, Archbishop of Toronto.

== Notable burials ==
A list of people interred here:

- Michael Power, Bishop of Toronto 1841–47, was buried in a crypt within the then-incomplete cathedral
- John Joseph Lynch, Bishop of Toronto 1860–1870, Archbishop of Toronto 1870–88, was buried in the exterior gardens next to the cathedral
- John Walsh, Archbishop of Toronto 1889–98

== See also ==
- List of cathedrals in Canada
- List of oldest buildings and structures in Toronto
- List of Roman Catholic Archbishops of Toronto
- List of Roman Catholic churches in Toronto
