= Diocese of London, Ontario =

Catholic ecclesiastical territory

Diocese of London Diœcesis Londonensis
- Coat of arms

Location
- Country: Canada
- Ecclesiastical province: Archdiocese of Toronto
- Metropolitan: Archdiocese of Toronto
- Deaneries: 6

Statistics
- Area: 21,349 km^{2} (8,243 sq mi); The territory comprises the following counties of Ontario: Middlesex, Elgin, Norfolk, Perth, Huron, Lambton, Kent, & Essex.
- Population: Total; Catholics: 1,944,182; 393, 579 (22.8%)
- Parishes: 104

Information
- Denomination: Catholic Church
- Sui iuris church: Latin Church
- Rite: Roman Rite
- Established: February 21, 1856; 170 years ago
- Cathedral: St. Peter's Cathedral Basilica
- Patron saint: The Immaculate Conception & St. Patrick
- Secular priests: 169

Current leadership
- Pope: Leo XIV
- Bishop: Daniel Miehm
- Metropolitan Archbishop: Frank Leo
- Bishops emeritus: Ronald Peter Fabbro

Website
- dol.ca

The Diocese of London (Latin: Diœcesis Londonensis) is a Latin Church ecclesiastical jurisdiction or diocese of the Catholic Church in Canada. It is a suffragan in the ecclesiastical province of the metropolitan Archdiocese of Toronto.

The present episcopal see of the diocese, St. Peter's Cathedral in London, Ontario, was built in a French Gothic Revival style from 1880 to 1885. It was raised to the status of a minor basilica by Pope John XXIII in December, 1961.

== Statistics and extent ==
The Diocese covers the counties of Middlesex, Elgin, Norfolk, Oxford, Perth, Huron, Lambton, Kent and Essex.

As of 2020, it pastorally served 444,310 Catholics (22.8% of 1,944,182 total) on 21,349 km^{2} in 130 parishes and 1 mission with 136 priests (101 diocesan, 35 religious), 73 deacons, 474 lay religious (1 brother, 473 sisters) and 11 seminarians.

The diocese also runs St. Peter's Seminary, which is now affiliated with the University of Western Ontario.

In 2019, the Survivor's Network of those Abused by Priests (SNAP) confirmed that 36 priests were credibly accused of sexually abusing minors. Following media coverage of the list, the Diocese waived confidentiality of their previous settlements. When interviewed about the list compiled by SNAP, Bishop Ronald Fabbro of the Diocese of London indicated that four other priests whose names were not on the list were accused of sexual abuse of minors. Bishop Fabbro refused to disclose the names of the priests. His decision faced considerable backlash from survivors and advocates.

== History ==
The Diocese of London was created on February 21, 1856, by Pope Pius IX, on territory carved out of the then Roman Catholic Diocese of Toronto (now a Metropolitan Archdiocese), along with the Diocese of Hamilton, Ontario. Pierre-Adolphe Pinsonnault was named the first Bishop of London on May 18 of that year.

On February 2, 1859 the see was renamed as Diocese of Sandwich / Sandvicen(sis) (Latin), as its first Bishop Pinsoneault moved the seat of the diocese to Sandwich, on the Detroit River. Then on November 15, 1869, it was renamed back as Diocese of London / Londonen(sis) (Latin), the diocesan see having returned under second Bishop John Walsh.

On May 21, 2020, Ontario appeals court dismissed a bid by the Diocese of London to drop a lawsuit filed by Irene Deschenes, who claimed that notorious predator priest Charles Henry Sylvestre sexually abused her when she was a minor between 1970 and 1973. Deschenes first began legal action against the Diocese of London in 1996. Sylvestre pled guilty in August 2006 to sexually abusing 47 females, whose ages ranged between 9 and 14, between 1952 and 1989 Local newspapers documented the lives of many of the women who refused the publication ban and spoke out about their abuse. He was given a three-year sentence in October 2006 and died January 22, 2007, of natural causes after only three months in prison. The case was documented by the Canadian Broadcasting Corporation news programme The Fifth Estate.

== Bishops ==
=== Episcopal Ordinaries ===
Suffragan Bishops of London, Ontario

- Pierre-Adolphe Pinsonnault (May 13, 1856 - 1859.02.02 see below)

Suffragan Bishops of Sandwich

- Pierre-Adolphe Pinsonnault (see above 1859.02.02 - retired December 18, 1866), emeritus as Titular Bishop of Birtha (1868.12.04 – death 1883.01.30)
- John Walsh (November 10, 1867 - 1869.10.03 see below)

Suffragan Bishops of London, Ontario

- John Walsh (see above 1869.10.03 - July 25, 1889), next Metropolitan Archbishop of Toronto (Ontario, Canada) (1889.07.25 – death 1898.07.30)
- Denis (T.) O'Connor, Congregation of St. Basil (C.S.B.) (19 October 1890 – 7 January 1899), next Metropolitan Archbishop of Toronto (Canada) (1899.01.07 – 1908.05.04), emeritus as Titular Archbishop of Laodicea (1908.05.04 – death 1911.06.30)
- Fergus Patrick McEvay (August 6, 1899 – April 13, 1908), next Metropolitan Archbishop of Toronto (Canada) (1908.04.13 – death 1911.05.10)
- Michael Francis Fallon, Missionary Oblates of Mary Immaculate (O.M.I.) (April 25, 1910 – death February 22, 1931)
- Thomas Kidd (July 3, 1931 – death June 2, 1950), previously Bishop of Calgary (Alberta, Canada) (1925.02.06 – 1931.07.03)
- John Christopher Cody (June 2, 1950 – death December 5, 1963), previously Bishop of Victoria (Canada) (1936.12.09 – 1946.04.06), Titular Bishop of Elatea (1946.04.06 – 1950.06.02) as Coadjutor Bishop of London (1946.04.06 – 1950.06.02)
- Gerald Emmett Carter (February 17, 1964 – April 29, 1978), succeeded as previous Titular Bishop of Altiburus (1961.12.01 – 1964.02.17) and Auxiliary Bishop of London (1961.12.01 – 1964.02.17); also President of Canadian Conference of Catholic Bishops (1975 – 1977); later Metropolitan Archbishop of Toronto (Canada) (1978.04.27 – retired 1990.03.17), created Cardinal-Priest of S. Maria in Traspontina (1979.06.30 – death 2003.04.06)
- John Michael Sherlock (July 8, 1978 – April 27, 2002), also President of Canadian Conference of Catholic Bishops (1983 – 1985); succeeded as previous Titular Bishop of Macriana in Mauretania (1974.06.25 – 1978.07.07) and Auxiliary Bishop of London (1974.06.25 – 1978.07.07); Bishop Emeritus when he died
- Ronald Peter Fabbro, Congregation of St. Basil (C.S.B.) (August 15, 2002 – April 21, 2026), previously Superior General of Congregation of St. Basil (Basilians) (1997 – 2002.04.27).
- Daniel Joseph Miehm (June 29, 2026 – ), previously Titular Bishop of Gor (2013.02.20 – 2017.03.10); Bishop of Peterborough, Ontario (2017.04.19 – 2026.04.21)

=== Auxiliary Bishops ===
- Marcel André J. Gervais (1980.04.19 – 1985.05.03), Titular Bishop of Rosemarkie (1980.04.19 – 1985.05.03); later Bishop of Sault Sainte Marie (Canada) (1985.05.03 – 1989.05.13), Coadjutor Archbishop of Ottawa (Ontario, Canada) (1989.05.13 – 1989.09.27) succeeding as Metropolitan Archbishop of Ottawa (Canada) (1989.09.27 – retired 2007.05.14), President of Canadian Conference of Catholic Bishops (1991 – 1993)
- Frederick Bernard Henry (1986.04.18 – 1995.03.24), Titular Bishop of Carinola (1986.04.18 – 1995.03.24); later Bishop of Thunder Bay (Canada) (1995.03.24 – 1998.01.19), Bishop of Calgary (Canada) (1998.01.19 – retired 2017.01.04)
- Richard John Grecco (1997.12.05 – 2002.04.27), Titular Bishop of Uccula (1997.12.05 – 2009.07.11); later Bishop of Charlottetown (Canada) (2009.07.11 – 2021.03.04)
- Robert Anthony Daniels (2004.09.21 – 2011.03.01), Titular Bishop of Scebatiana (2004.09.21 – 2011.03.01); next Bishop of Grand Falls (Canada) (2011.03.01 – ...)
- Józef Andrzej Dąbrowski, Michaelites (C.S.M.A.) (2015.01.31 – 2023.04.02), Titular Bishop of Casæ in Numidia (2015.01.31 – 2023.04.02)); later Bishop of Charlottetown (Canada) (2009.07.11 – 2025.11.01) and Bishop of Hamilton (Canada) (2025.11.01 – ...)

=== Other priests of this diocese who became bishops ===
- Eugène Philippe LaRocque, appointed Bishop of Alexandria in Ontario in 1974
- James Leonard Doyle, appointed Bishop of Peterborough, Ontario in 1976
- William Terrence McGrattan, appointed Auxiliary Bishop of Toronto, Ontario in 2009
- Alan Campeau, appointed Bishop of Thunder Bay, Ontario in 2025

== Education ==
- Conseil scolaire catholique Providence
- Brant Haldimand Norfolk Catholic District School Board
- Huron Perth Catholic District School Board
- London District Catholic School Board
- St. Clair Catholic District School Board
- Windsor-Essex Catholic District School Board

== Religious Communities ==
The following are communities of consecrated life in the Diocese of London:

- Religious Communities of Women
1. Sisters Adorers of the Precious Blood (R.P.B.)
2. Sisters of the Holy Names of Jesus and Mary (S.N.J.M.)
3. Franciscan Sisters of the Immaculate Conception (S.F.B.Z.)
4. The Congregation of the Sisters of St. Joseph in Canada (C.S.J.)
5. Ursuline Sisters of the Agonizing Heart of Jesus (U.S.A.H.J.)
6. Ursuline Sisters of Chatham, Ontario (O.S.U.)
7. Missionary Sisters of the Precious Blood (CPS)
8. Sisters of Service (S.O.S.)
9. Sisters Servants of Mary Immaculate (S.S.M.I.)
- Religious Communities of Men
1. Brothers of St. Louis (C.S.A.)
2. Congregation of St. Basil (C.S.B.)
3. Congregation of St. Michael the Archangel (C.S.M.A.)
4. Congregation of the Holy Redeemer (C.Ss.R.)
5. Congregation of the Rosarians (C.R.)
6. Order of Discalced Carmelite Friars (O.C.D.)
7. Order of Friars Minor Capuchin (O.F.M.Cap.)
8. Society of Christ (S.Chr.)

== Cemeteries ==
- Heavenly Rest Catholic Cemetery (Windsor)
- Resurrection Catholic Cemetery (Sarnia)
- St. Peter's Catholic Cemetery (London)

== See also ==
- List of Catholic dioceses in Canada
- Ecclesiastical Province of Toronto
- St. Peter's Cathedral Basilica
- St. Peter's Seminary
- Our Lady of the Assumption

== Sources and external links ==
- Roman Catholic Diocese of London site
- GCatholic, with Google map - date for all sections
- St. Peter's Seminary (Diocese of London, Ontario)
- "Diocese of London". Catholic-Hierarchy.

Bibliography

- Herbermann, Charles, ed. (1913). "London (Ontario)" . Catholic Encyclopedia. New York: Robert Appleton Company.
