= Fergus McEvay =

Canadian prelate of the Catholic Church (1852–1911)

The Most Reverend Fergus Patrick McEvay
- Archbishop of Toronto
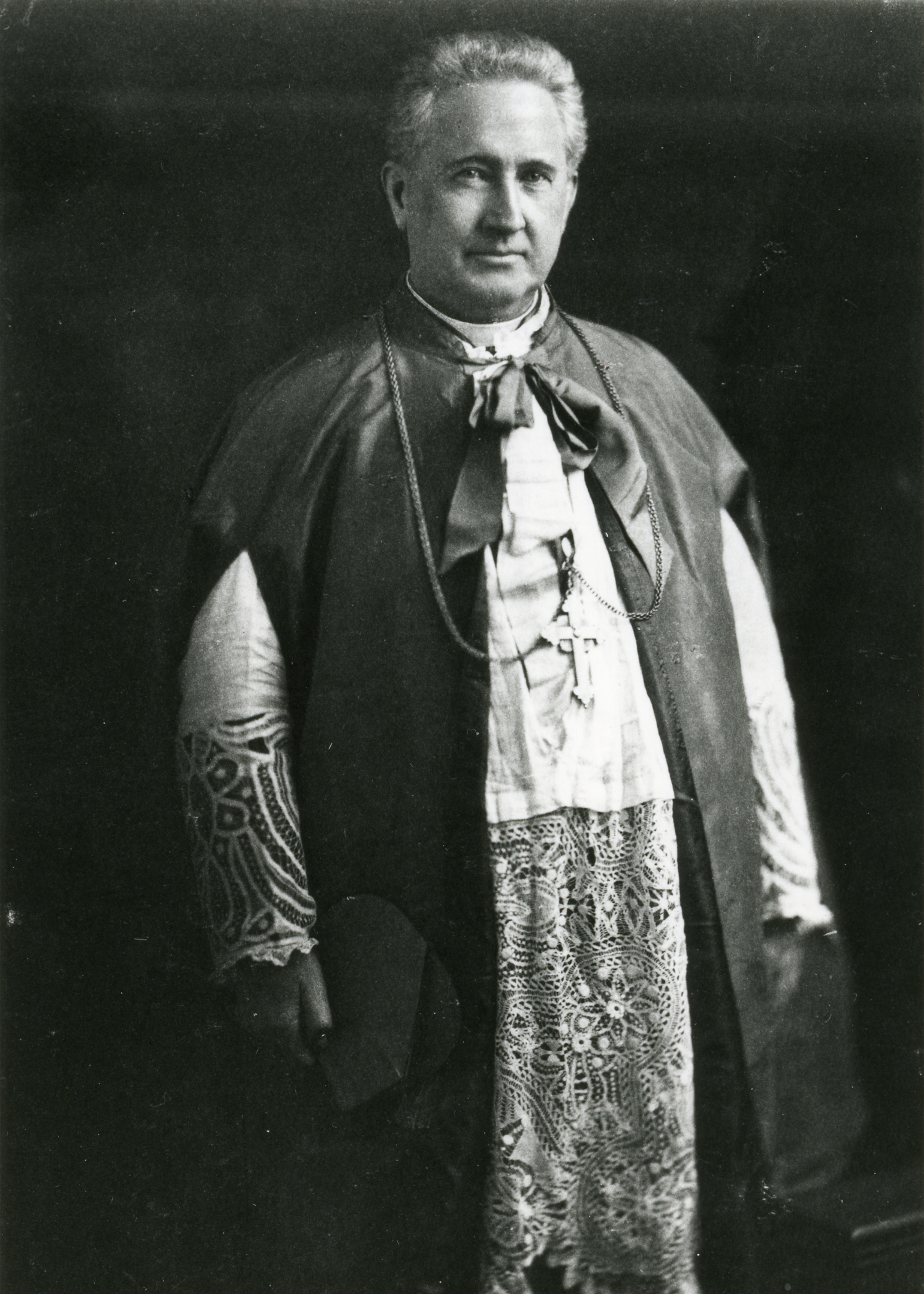
- Church: Catholic
- Archdiocese: Toronto
- Appointed: April 13, 1908
- Term ended: May 10, 1911
- Predecessor: Denis O'Connor
- Successor: Neil McNeil
- Other post: Bishop of London, Ontario (1899–1908)

Orders
- Ordination: July 9, 1882 by James Vincent Cleary
- Consecration: August 6, 1899 by Denis O'Connor

Personal details
- Born: December 8, 1852 Lindsay, Ontario, Canada
- Died: May 10, 1911 (aged 58) Toronto, Ontario, Canada

Fergus Patrick McEvay (December 8, 1852 – May 10, 1911) was a Canadian prelate of the Catholic Church. He served as Bishop of London (1899–1908) and later Archbishop of Toronto (1908–1911).

== Early life and education ==
McEvay was born on December 8, 1852, in Lindsay, Ontario, to Michael and Mary (née Lehane) McEvay. His father died in 1855 when McEvay was only two years old, and he received his early education at the separate school in Lindsay. He later went to live with an uncle in Ennismore and initially pursued a business education.

In 1874, McEvay entered St. Michael's College at Toronto, where he made his classical studies and won medals in literature. He began his preparation for the priesthood in 1879 at Saint Francis de Sales Seminary, near Milwaukee, Wisconsin, and completed his theological training at the Grand Séminaire de Montréal.

== Priesthood ==
McEvay was ordained a priest on July 9, 1882, by Bishop James Vincent Cleary for the Diocese of Kingston. He was soon transferred to the Diocese of Peterborough and assigned to the missions at Fenelon Falls and Bobcaygeon. He was named rector of the Cathedral of St. Peter-in-Chains in 1887 by Bishop Thomas Joseph Dowling. During this time, he secured property for St. Joseph's Hospital in Peterborough and oversaw the initial construction.

When Bishop Dowling was transferred to the Diocese of Hamilton in 1889, McEvay accompanied him and was appointed rector of St. Mary's Cathedral and vicar general of the diocese. While in Hamilton, he worked on renovations to the cathedral, built a mortuary chapel at Holy Sepulchre Cemetery, and coordinated the establishment of two new parishes in the city. In 1892, he was named a papal chamberlain by Pope Leo XIII with the title of monsignor.

== Episcopal career ==
=== Bishop of London ===
On May 27, 1899, Pope Leo appointed McEvay the fourth Bishop of London, Ontario. He succeeded Bishop Denis O'Connor, who had been promoted to Archbishop of Toronto. McEvay received his episcopal consecration on August 6, 1899, from Archbishop O'Connor, with Bishop Dowling and Bishop Richard Alphonsus O'Connor serving as co-consecrators.

In 1900, the first full year of McEvay's tenure, the Diocese of London contained 78 churches and 53 parochial schools to serve 60,000 Catholics. By the end of his tenure in 1908, the Catholic population was unchanged but every parish now had a parochial school.

=== Archbishop of Toronto ===
Following the resignation of Archbishop O'Connor, McEvay succeed him again upon being appointed the fourth Archbishop of Toronto on April 13, 1908. He took formal charge of the archdiocese on the following June 17, when he was installed at St. Michael's Cathedral.

Although his three-year tenure remains the shortest in the archdiocese's history, McEvay founded seven new parishes and ten new parochial schools. Among the parishes he founded were churches for the growing communities of Italian, Polish, and Ukrainian immigrants, also working to recruit priests who spoke their languages. Even as he strived to accommodate immigrant communities, McEvay established himself as a leader of English-speaking Catholics in Canada, and laid the cornerstone for St. Augustine's Seminary in 1910 as an alternative to American institutions and the Grand Séminaire de Montréal. In 1908, he helped organize the Catholic Church Extension Society of Canada, serving as its chairman and chancellor.

McEvay suffered from pernicious anemia and sought treatment at Mount Clemens, Michigan, and Atlantic City, New Jersey. He eventually succumbed to his illness and died at his residence in Toronto on May 10, 1911, at age 58.

== See also ==
- List of Roman Catholic Archbishops of Toronto

Religious titles
Preceded by Denis T. O'Connor	Archbishop of Toronto; 1908–1911	Succeeded by Neil McNeil
Preceded by Denis T. O'Connor	Bishop of London; 1899–1908	Succeeded by Michael Francis Fallon
