= John E. Belcher =

Canadian engineer & architect

- Born: John Edward Belcher; 20 February 1834; Cork, Ireland, UK
- Died: 20 August 1915 (aged 81); Peterborough, Ontario, Canada
- Burial place: Little Lake Cemetery, Peterborough, Ontario
- Education: Queen's College Cork
- Occupation: Architect
- Years active: 1858–1911
- Notable work: Market Hall; Peterborough Collegiate; Sacred Heart Church
- Spouse: Clementina MacDonald (m. 1842)
- Children: 4

John Edward Belcher (20 February 1834 – 20 August 1915) was an Irish-born Canadian civil engineer and architect. He is most known for his work in Peterborough, Ontario, where he designed many churches, residences and civic buildings which are now local landmarks. Belcher served as president of the Ontario Association of Architects in 1899.

== Biography ==
John Edward Belcher was born on 20 February 1834 in Cork, Ireland. He was educated at Queen's College Cork, and articled with his father, Samuel R. Belcher, who was also an architect. Belcher apprenticed with John Benson before emigrating to British North America in 1858.

Upon settling in Peterborough, Ontario, Belcher became civic engineer for the County and later Town of Peterborough. He was responsible for a number of civic improvements and public works projects. Most notably, the Market Hall, completed in 1890.

He built a number of Anglican, Methodist and Presbyterian churches in Peterborough and its surrounding area. In 1885, despite being an Anglican, Belcher was appointed diocesan architect by the newly formed Roman Catholic Diocese of Peterborough. In this role, he expanded and renovated the Cathedral of St. Peter-in-Chains and built parish churches in Peterborough, Cobourg and Douro.

Belcher married Clementina MacDonald in 1842 and they had four children. He died in Peterborough on 20 August 1915 and is buried in Little Lake Cemetery.

== Notable works ==
- St. Luke's Church, Ashburnham, Ontario, 1877 (gutted by fire 1959)
- Morrow Building, Peterborough, Ontario, 1879
- St. John the Evangelist Church (chancel and parish hall), Peterborough, Ontario, 1879–82
- Cathedral of St. Peter-in-Chains (sacristy and renovations), Peterborough, Ontario, 1884–85
- Market Hall, Peterborough, Ontario, 1889–90
- All Saints Church, Peterborough, Ontario, 1890–91
- Canadian Bank of Commerce, Peterborough, Ontario, 1892
- Pagoda Bridge, Jackson Park, Peterborough, Ontario, 1895
- Peterborough Collegiate, 1907
- Sacred Heart Church, Peterborough, Ontario, 1907–09
- Peterborough Public Library, Peterborough, Ontario, 1910–11, with William Blackwell (now part of Peterborough City Hall)

== Gallery ==
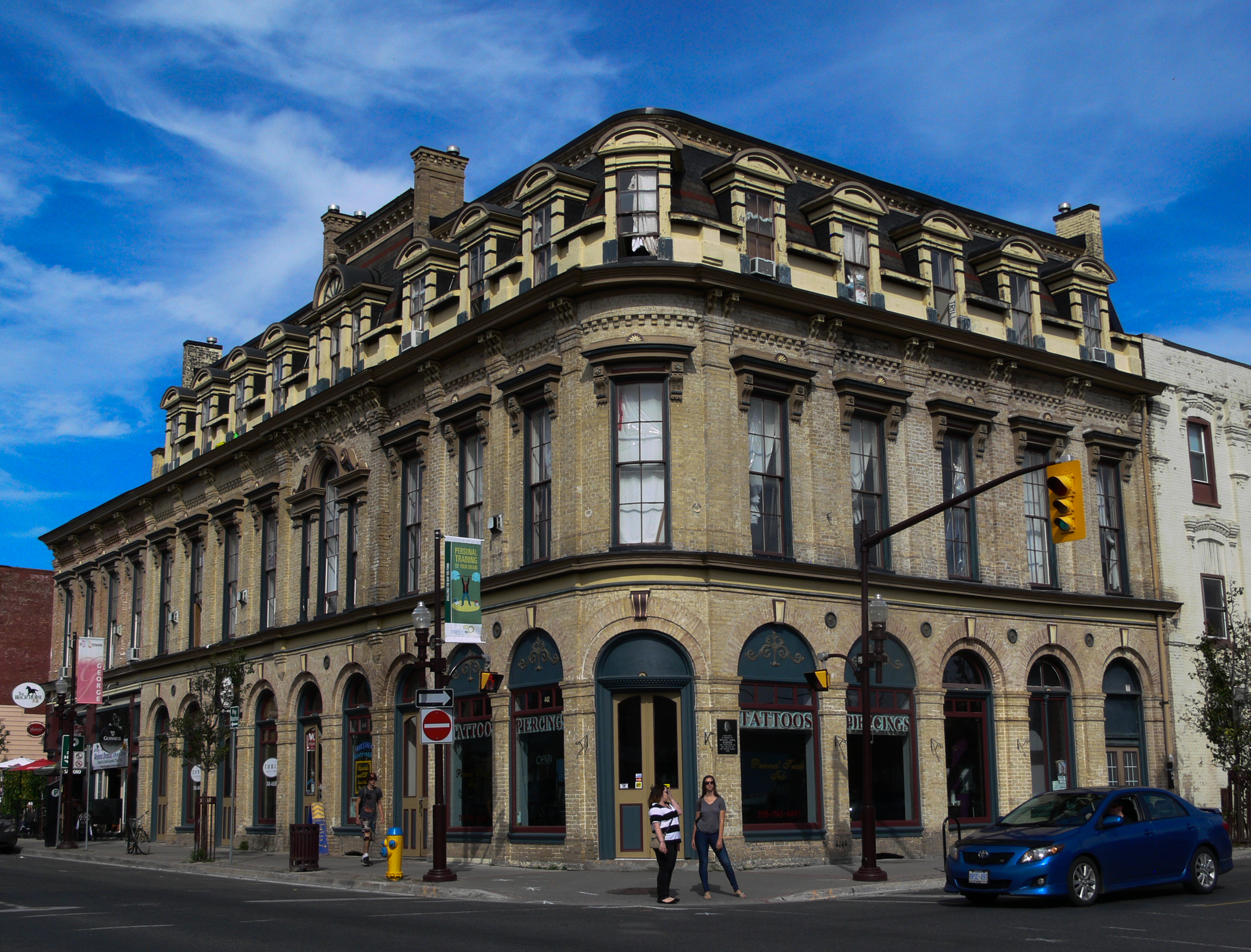
Morrow Building

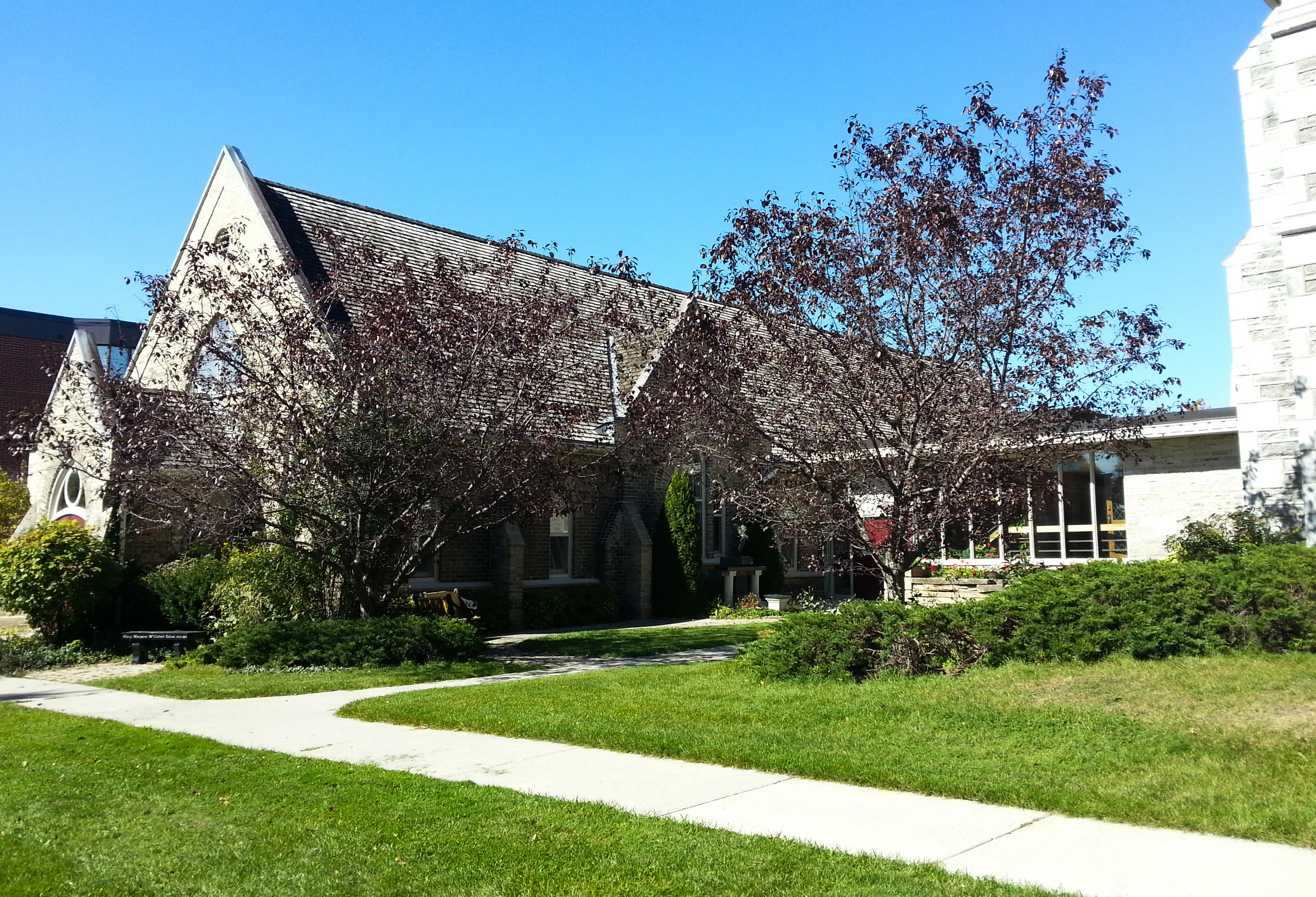
St. John the Evangelist Church Parish Hall

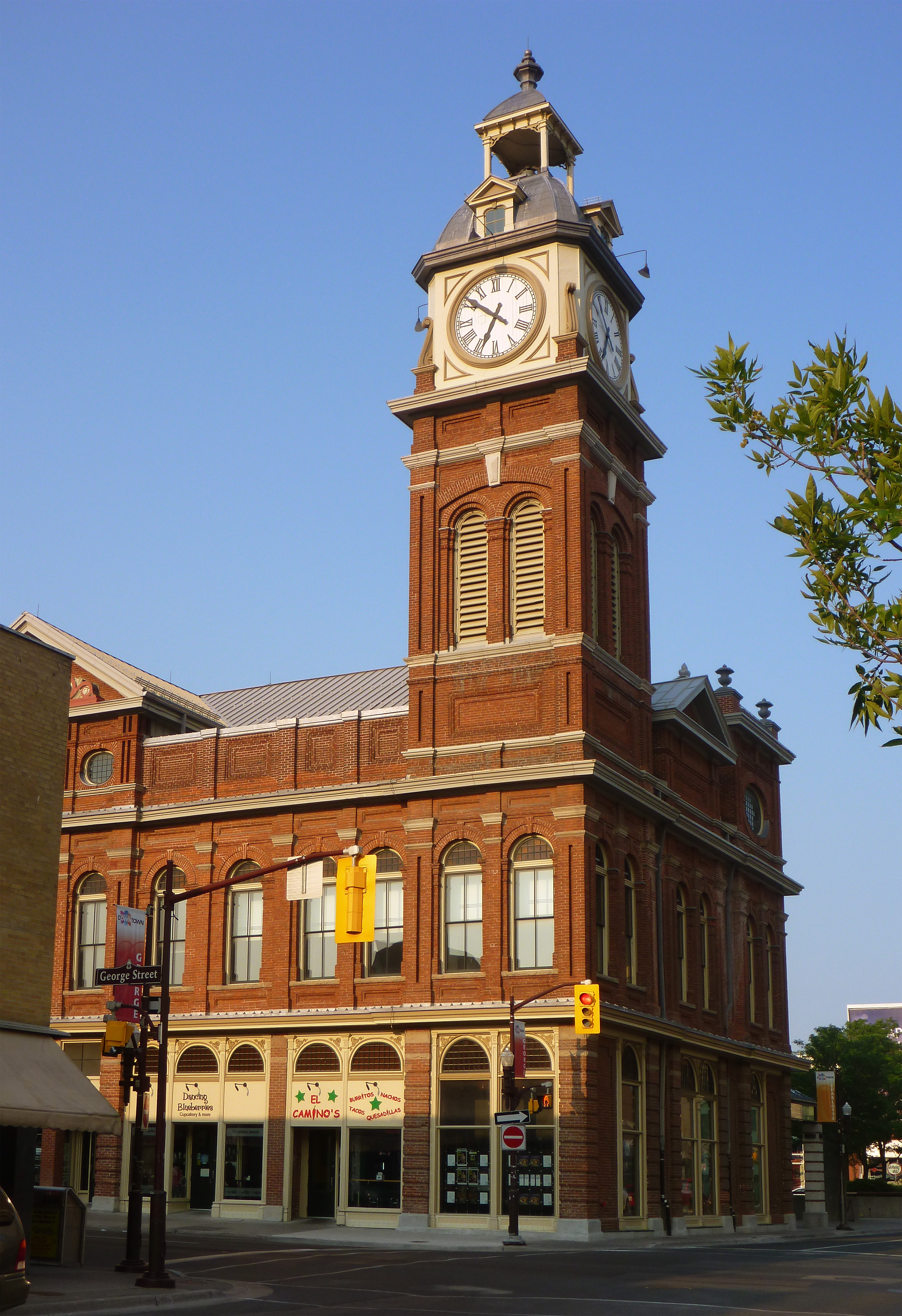
Market Hall

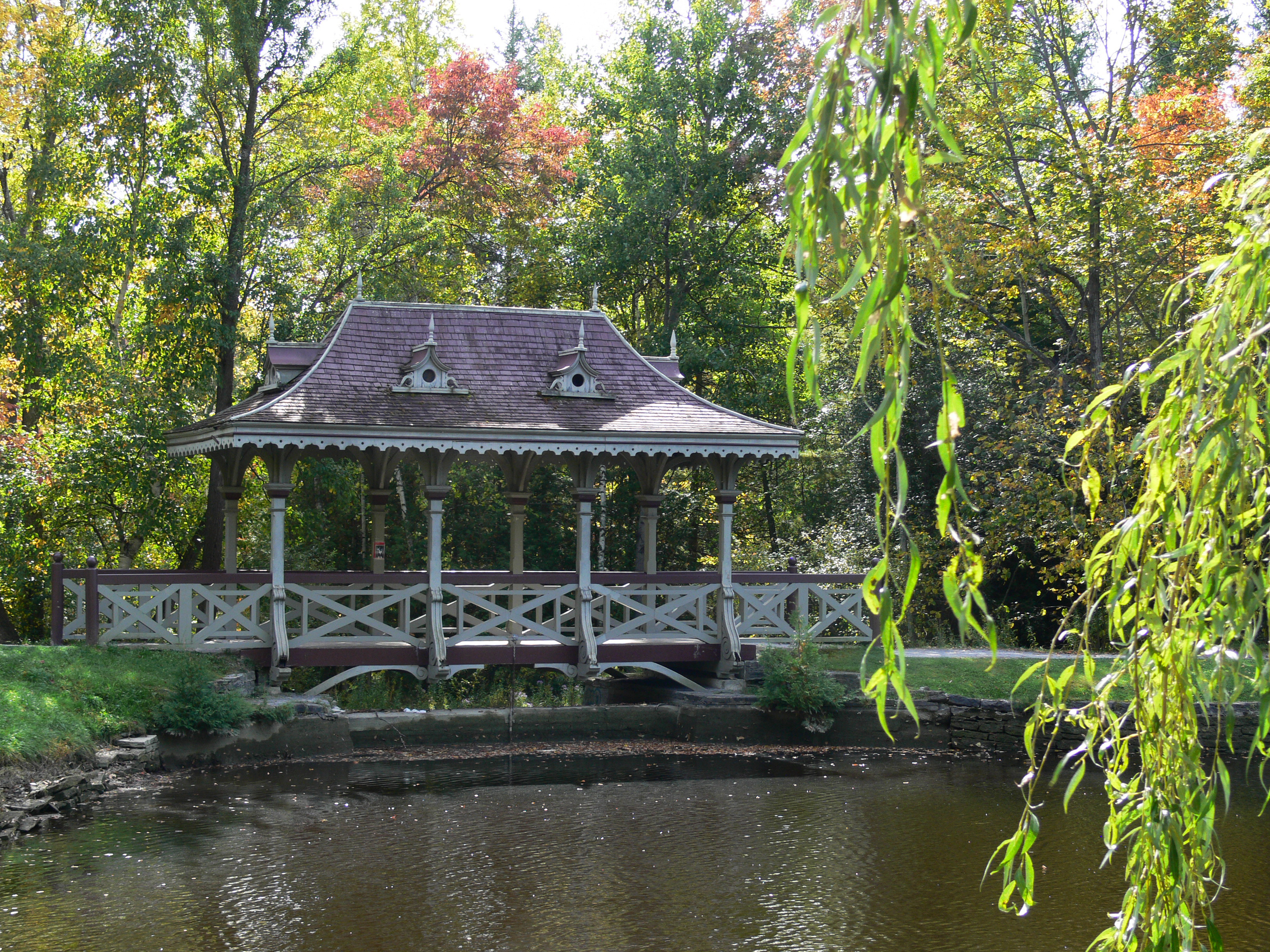
Pagoda Bridge, Jackson Park

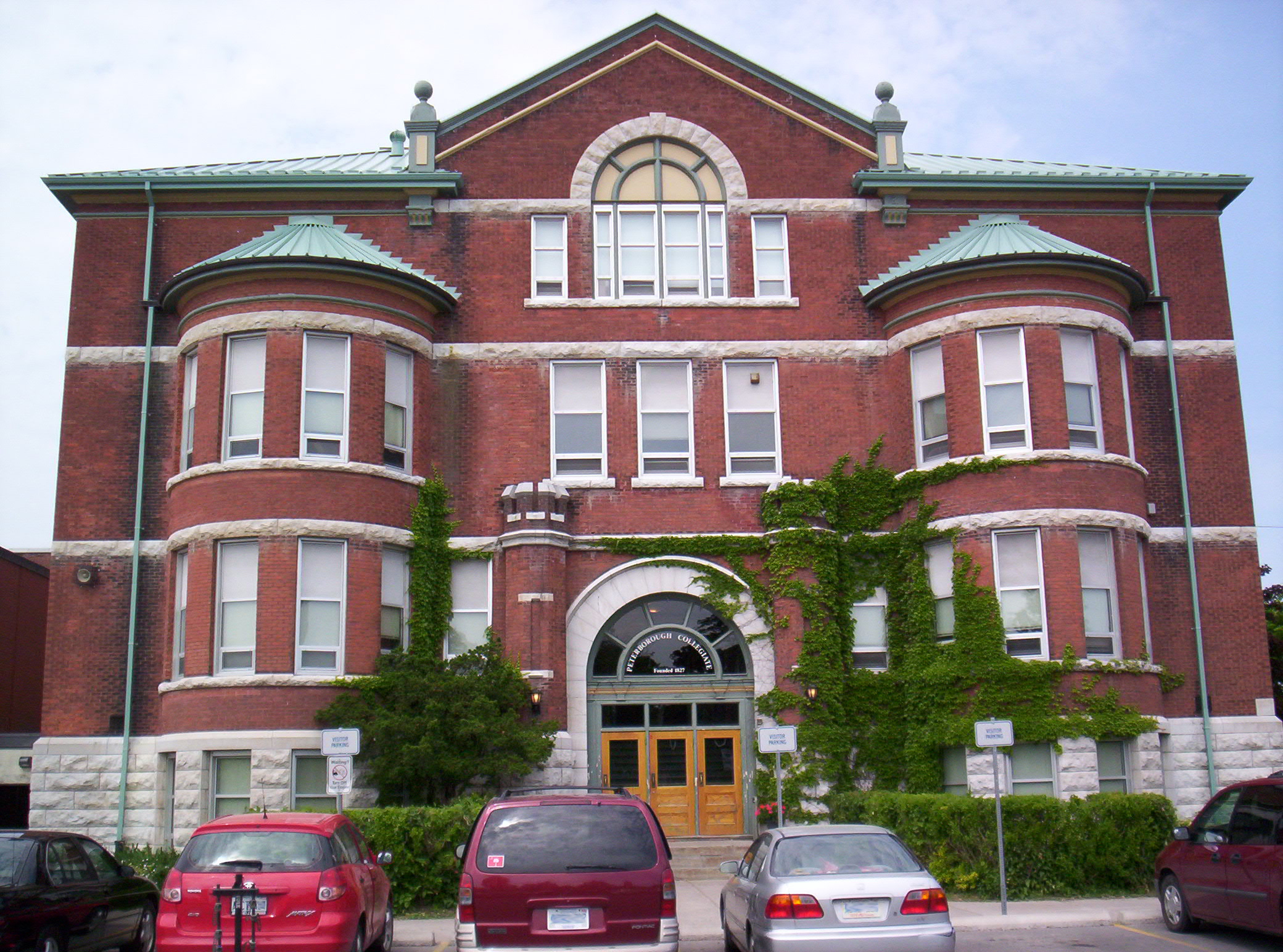
Peterborough Collegiate

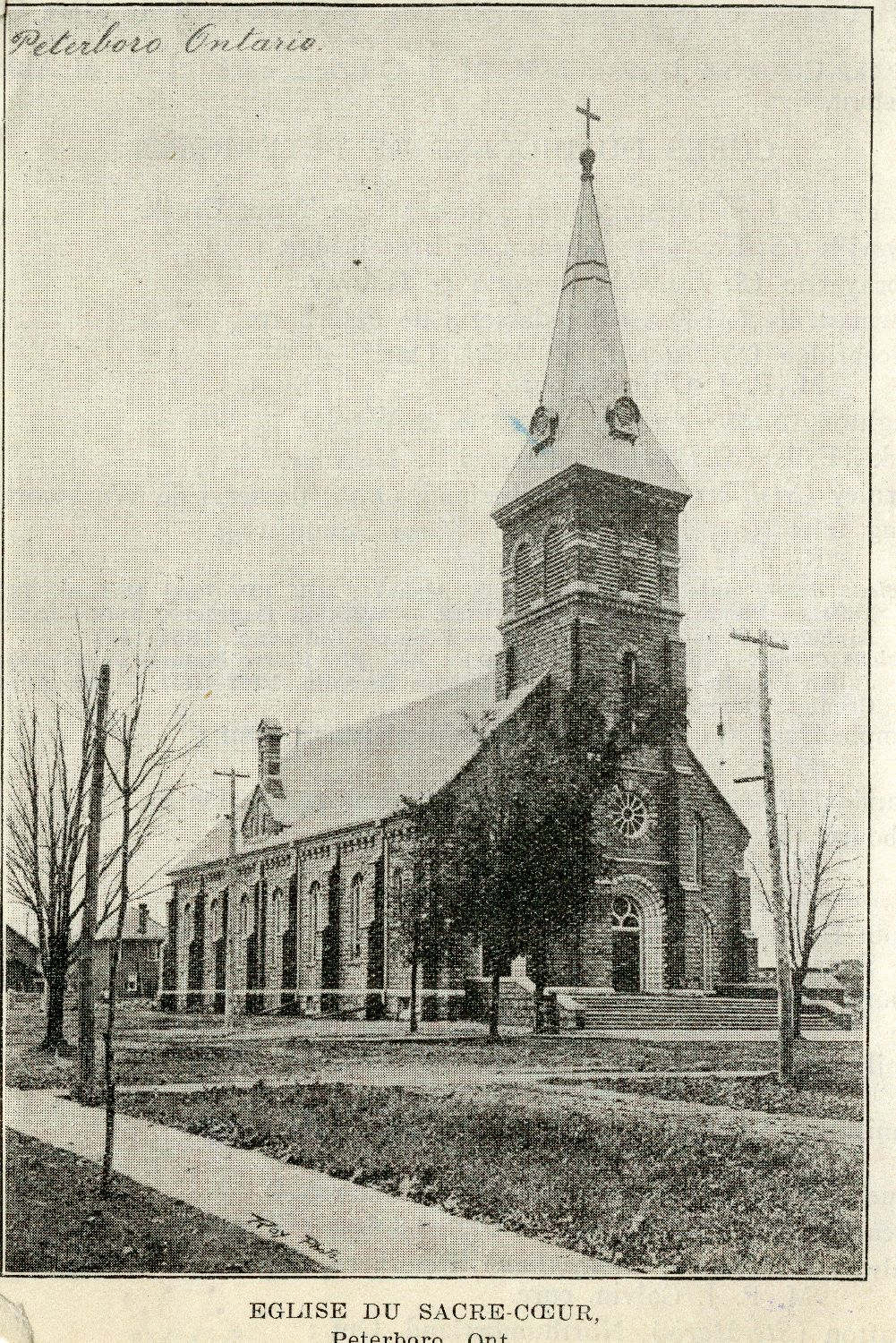
Sacred Heart Church
