= Sacred Heart Church (Peterborough, Ontario) =

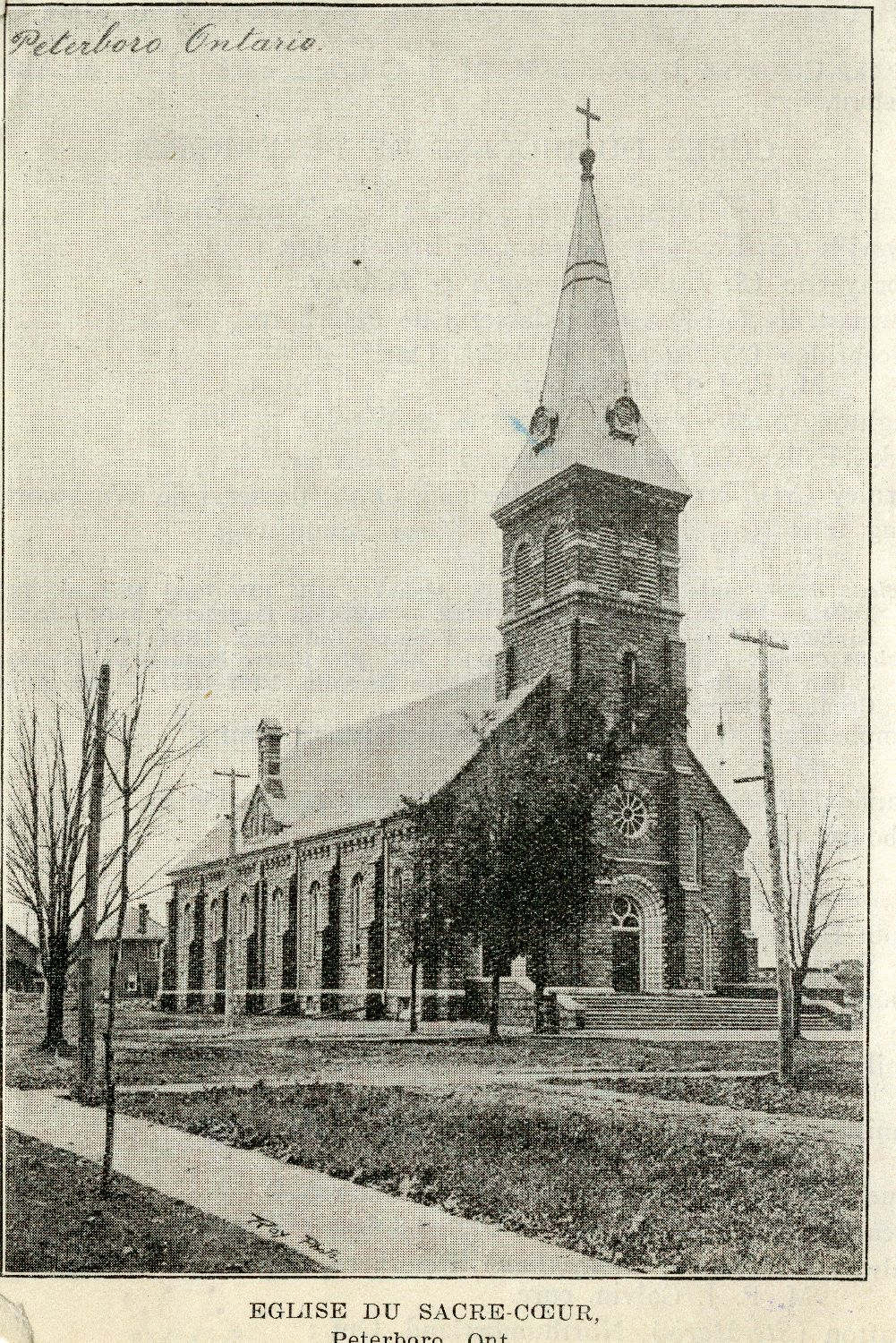
- Sacred Heart Church in 1920
- Sacred Heart Church
- 44°17′29.9358″N 78°19′17.9358″W
- Location: 210 Romaine Street; Peterborough, Ontario; K9J 2C4
- Denomination: Roman Catholic
- Website: sacredheartpeterborough.ca

History
- Dedication: Sacred Heart of Jesus

Architecture
- Architect: John E. Belcher
- Style: Romanesque Revival
- Years built: 1909

Administration
- Archdiocese: Kingston
- Diocese: Peterborough

Clergy
- Priest(s): The Rev. Fr. Alex Salazar, IVE

Sacred Heart Church is a Roman Catholic parish church in Peterborough, Ontario, Canada. The Romanesque Revival building designed by prominent local architect John E. Belcher was completed in 1909. Sacred Heart offers the Traditional Latin Mass. The church's Casavant Frères organ has been declared a historic treasure by the Royal Canadian College of Organists.

== History ==
In 1907, the Diocese of Peterborough decided to build a second parish church in the city of Peterborough. Prior to this, Cathedral of St. Peter-in-Chains served the entire city and surrounding rural municipalities. A lot at the northeast corner of Romaine and Aylmer Streets was purchased for $2,300 in March of that year. St. Peter's parish raised over $13,000 toward the building of the new church.

The building was designed in the Romanesque Revival style by prominent local architect John E. Belcher and built by local contractors William Langford and Richard Sheehy using red granite from Stony Lake. The church was blessed and dedicated on November 21, 1909, by Bishop Richard Alphonsus O'Connor. The Casavant Frères organ was installed in 1914 following a $3,000 bequest from parishioner Martin McManus. In 2014, the Royal Canadian College of Organists declared the organ a historic treasure. Sacred Heart is one of four churches in the Diocese of Peterborough that offers the Traditional Latin Mass.
