= Saint Peter in Chains Cathedral =

Saint Peter in Chains Cathedral may refer to:

- Cathedral of Saint Peter-in-Chains, Peterborough, Ontario, Canada
- Cathedral Basilica of Saint Peter in Chains (Cincinnati), United States
