= Jackson Park =

Jackson Park may refer to:

- Jackson Park (Peterborough, Ontario), Canada
- Jackson Park (Windsor, Ontario), Canada
- Jackson Park, Kilternan, Republic of Ireland
- Jackson Park (Chicago), Illinois, United States
- Jackson Park (Negaunee, Michigan), United States
- Jackson Park (Seattle), Washington, United States
- Jackson Park (Milwaukee), Wisconsin, United States
