= Peterborough City Hall =

City hall

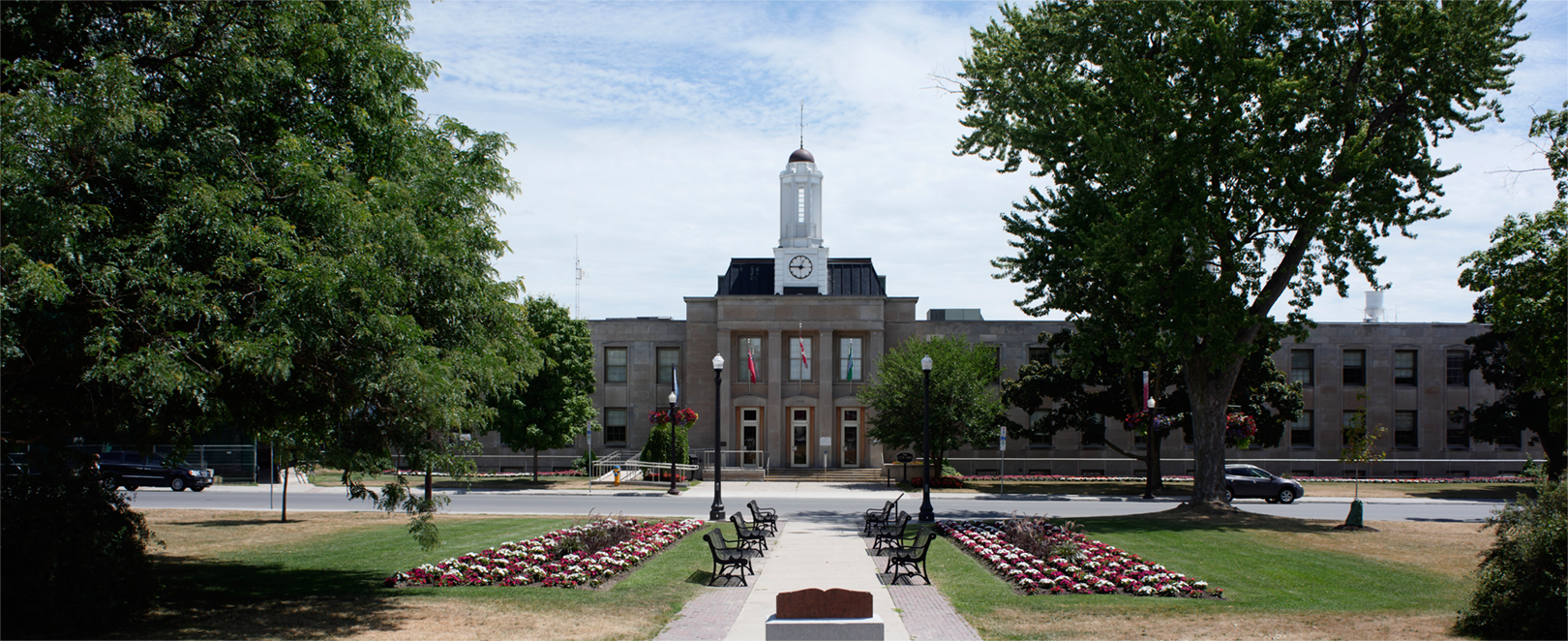
- Interactive map of the Peterborough City Hall area

General information
- Architectural style: Beaux-Arts
- Location: Peterborough, Ontario, 500 George Street North
- Coordinates: 44°18′32.6088″N 78°19′11.0892″W
- Construction started: December 1, 1950
- Inaugurated: October 1951
- Owner: Corporation of the City of Peterborough

Design and construction
- Architect: Marani & Morris

Peterborough City Hall is the seat of the municipal government of Peterborough, Ontario, Canada. It is a 2 1/2-storey building, located at 500 George Street North, across the street from Confederation Park, the Drill Hall and Armouries and Peterborough Collegiate. The complex consists of two buildings: the City Hall built in 1951 and the former Carnegie Library built in 1911.

== History ==
=== Carnegie Building ===
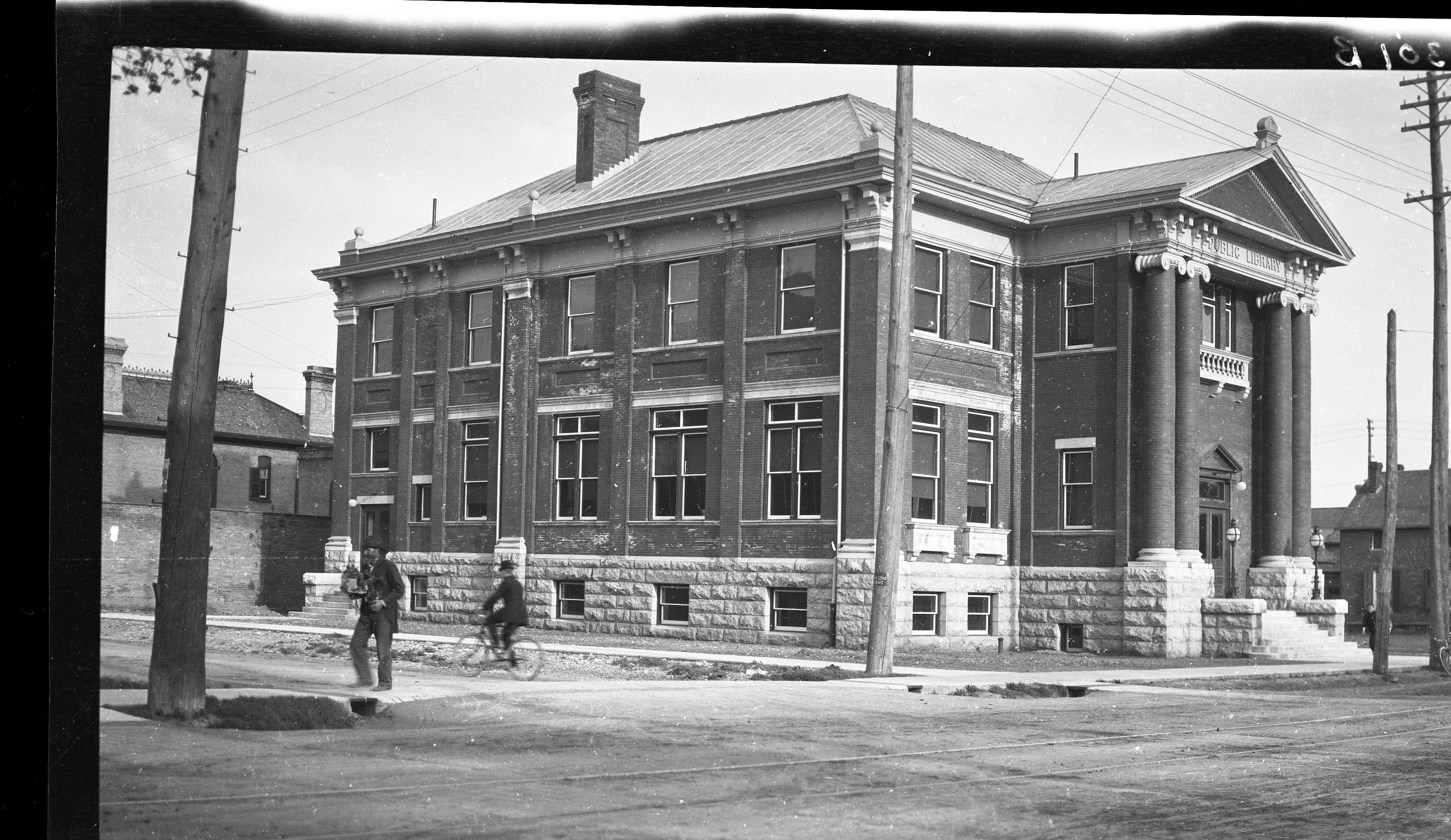
The Carnegie Building, circa 1911

The north wing of the City Hall was the original location of the Peterborough Public Library. Built 1910-1911 using funds from the Andrew Carnegie Foundation, it was one of only 125 Carnegie libraries in Canada. The library was built in the Beaux-Arts style by prominent local architect John E. Belcher. The building also housed the collection of the Victoria Museum, the precursor to the Peterborough Museum & Archives.

=== City Hall ===
The cornerstone was laid on December 1, 1950, by Leslie Frost, Premier of Ontario, and City Hall was officially opened in October 1951 by Charlotte Whitton, Mayor of Ottawa, and Mayor George Rowell Chamberlain of Peterborough, England. The sandstone building is a late example of Beaux-Arts architecture inspired by the City Beautiful movement. It was designed by Marani & Morris and built by Eastwood Construction.

The lobby features a marble terrazzo-tiled floor depicting a map of Peterborough County with brass inlay.

== Today ==
City Hall is home to the administrative offices and municipal services of the City of Peterborough. The Peterborough City Council meets in the Council Chambers on the second floor.

== See also ==
- Peterborough Public Library
- Peterborough City Council
- Media related to Peterborough City Hall at Wikimedia Commons
