= Little Lake Cemetery =

Cemetery in Peterborough, Ontario

- Interactive map of Little Lake Cemetery

Details
- Established: 1850
- Location: 915 Haggart Street; Peterborough, Ontario; K9J 2Y1
- Coordinates: 44°17′34.487″N 78°18′39.052″W
- Type: Non-profit, non-denominational
- Style: Rural
- Owned by: Opus Tribute Group
- Size: 32.8 acres (13.3 ha)
- Website: www.highlandparkfuneralcentre.com
- Find a Grave: Little Lake Cemetery

Little Lake Cemetery is a non-denominational cemetery located in Peterborough, Ontario, Canada. It opened in 1850 and is located on the southern shore of Little Lake.

== History ==
Founded in 1850 as a private trust cemetery with a public mandate, Little Lake Cemetery was the first community non-profit cemetery in Canada West. Prior to its establishment, the people of Peterborough buried their dead in the middle of town where Peterborough Collegiate now stands. This downtown cemetery was closed in 1854. The cemetery was surveyed by F. F. Passmore, with the assistance of Sandford Fleming.

The chapel was constructed in the Carpenter Gothic style in 1877 by Alfred Belcher, brother of John E. Belcher. Some argued the construction of a chapel went against the non-denominational character of the cemetery, but it is largely a decorative landmark and a convenience during inclement weather.

== Notable interments ==
- John E. Belcher (1834–1915), architect and engineer
- John Bertram (1837–1904), Member of Parliament for Peterborough West (1872–1878)
- Frank Buckland (1902–1991), ice hockey administrator
- Isabella Valancy Crawford (1846–1887), writer and poet
- Iva Campbell Fallis (1883–1956), second female Canadian senator
- H. E. T. Haultain (1869–1961), engineer and inventor
- Henry Rowe Hocking Kenner (1867–1944), educator
- Colleen Peterson (1950–1996), country and folk singer
- Richard Birdsall Rogers (1857–1927), engineer known for the Peterborough Lift Lock
