= Michael Fallon (priest) =

Irish-Canadian Catholic priest and a Canadian football coach

Michael Fallon O.M.I.
- Bishop of London, Ontario
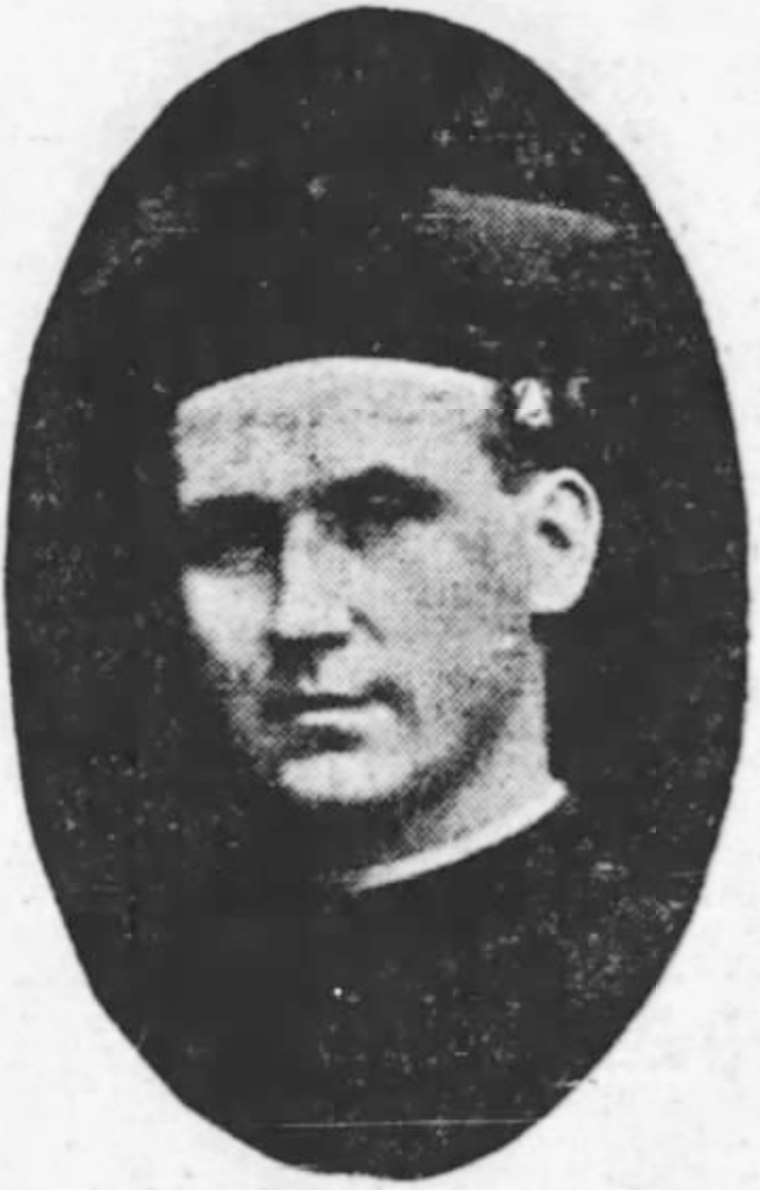
- Church: Catholic Church
- Diocese: Diocese of London, Ontario
- In office: 18 December 1909 – 22 February 1931
- Predecessor: Fergus McEvay
- Successor: John Thomas Kidd

Orders
- Ordination: 29 July 1894 by Lucido Parocchi
- Consecration: 25 April 1910 by Fergus McEvay

Personal details
- Born: Michael Francis Fallon; May 17, 1867 Kingston, Province of Canada, British Empire
- Died: February 22, 1931 (aged 63) London, Ontario, Canada

Michael Francis Fallon OMI (May 17, 1867 – February 22, 1931) was a Canadian Catholic Bishop and a Canadian football coach. He was the Bishop of Roman Catholic Diocese of London, Ontario from 1910 to 1931 and the head coach of the Ottawa Gee-Gees teams in the 1890s.

Fallon was born on May 17, 1867 in Kingston, Ontario. He was educated at the Christian Brothers School in Kingston and received degrees from University of Ottawa (B.A.) and the Pontifical Gregorian University (D.D.). He was ordained in 1884 and became an English literature professor at the University of Ottawa and was the University's vice-rector. He also coached the university's football team and led them to the dominion championship in 1894, 1896, and 1897. In 1898, Fallon was made a priest of St. Joseph's Parish. Three years later, he was transferred to the Roman Catholic Diocese of Buffalo. He then served as provincial of the first American state of the Missionary Oblates of Mary Immaculate. Fallon’s evangelization among Protestants in the Western provinces of Canada won the support of Archbishop Donato Sbarretti, the Apostolic Delegate to Canada and Newfoundland, who subsequently looked to Fallon for service and advice. The Apostolic Delegate recommended him in 1909 for the appointment of the first Bishop of Regina. From April 25, 1910, until his death on February 22, 1931, he was Bishop of Roman Catholic Diocese of London, Ontario. He is buried in the chapel of London's St. Peter's Seminary.

Religious titles
Preceded by Fergus McEvay	Bishop of London; 1910 - 1931	Succeeded by Thomas Kidd
