= Catholic Missions in Canada =

- Formation: 23 September 1908; 117 years ago
- Location(s): 201-1155 Yonge St Toronto, ON M4T 1W2
- Coordinates: 43.682218°N 79.391174°W
- President: Rev. David Reilander
- Main organ: Board of Governors
- Affiliations: Roman Catholic Church
- Website: www.cmic.info

Catholic Missions in Canada is a fundraising organization that supports poor missions in Canada. The movement was organized as an independent society, bearing the name of The Catholic Church Extension Society of Canada, by a group including Fergus Patrick McEvay, Archbishop of Toronto.

The society was formed on 23 September 1908, by Monsignor E. Alfred Burke from the Diocese of Charlottetown, Prince Edward Island. A papal brief was issued to the Church Extension Society in Canada on 9 June 1910, granting it papal approval and pontifical status. The Canadian society purchased the Catholic Register, a weekly paper, enlarged it, and turned it into its official organ.

In 1999 the name of the Society was changed to Catholic Missions In Canada.
