= Jean-François Jamot =

- Bishop of Peterborough
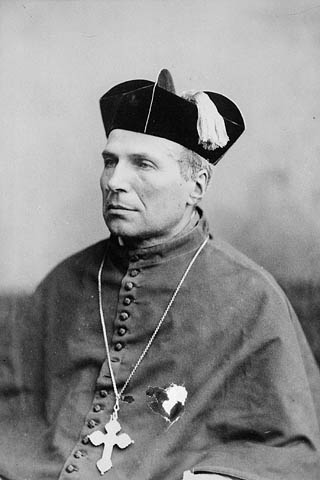
- Church: Catholic Church
- Diocese: Diocese of Peterborough
- Appointed: July 11, 1882
- Term ended: May 4, 1886 (his death)
- Predecessor: Office established
- Successor: Thomas Joseph Dowling
- Other post: Vicar Apostolic of Northern Canada (1874-1882)

Orders
- Ordination: October 9, 1853 by Bernard Buissas
- Consecration: February 24, 1874 by John Joseph Lynch

Personal details
- Born: June 23, 1828 Châtelard, Nouvelle-Aquitaine, France
- Died: May 4, 1886 (aged 57) Peterborough, Ontario, Canada

Jean-François Jamot (June 23, 1828 – May 4, 1886) was a French-born Canadian prelate of the Catholic Church. He was the first Bishop of Peterborough, serving from 1882 until his death in 1886.

== Biography ==
Jamot was born on June 23, 1828, in Châtelard, Creuse, to Gilbert and Jeanne (née Cornabat) Jamot. He graduated from the academy of Bourges in 1849 and then studied at the diocesan seminary in Limoges. He was ordained a priest on October 9, 1853.

The following year, while teaching classics at the College D'Ajain, he met Bishop Armand-François-Marie de Charbonnel of the Diocese of Toronto and volunteered to work as a missionary in Canada. He then studied at All Hallows College in Dublin for a few months to learn English before arriving in Toronto in May 1855. He was sent to Barrie, where he remained as pastor for eight years. While there, he was also appointed chancellor and vicar-general of the Diocese of Toronto in 1860. Three years later, he was made rector of St. Michael's Cathedral. He accompanied Bishop John Joseph Lynch to the First Vatican Council (1869-1870).

On February 3, 1874, Jamot was appointed the first Vicar Apostolic of Northern Canada and titular bishop of Sarepta by Pope Pius IX. He received his episcopal consecration on the following February 24 while in Issoudun from Archbishop Lynch of Toronto, with Bishop de Charbonnel and Bishop Thomas de Ladoue of Nevers serving as co-consecrators.

The vicariate then included the districts of Muskoka, Parry Sound, Nipissing, Algoma, and Thunder Bay. Jamot originally established his residence at Sault Ste. Marie but later moved it to Bracebridge. On July 11, 1882, Pope Leo XIII elevated the vicariate to the Diocese of Peterborough, adding four counties from the Diocese of Kingston, and named Jamot as its first bishop.

Jamot died in Peterborough on May 4, 1886, at age 57.
