= Market Hall (Peterborough, Ontario) =

Performing arts centre in Peterborough, Ontario, Canada

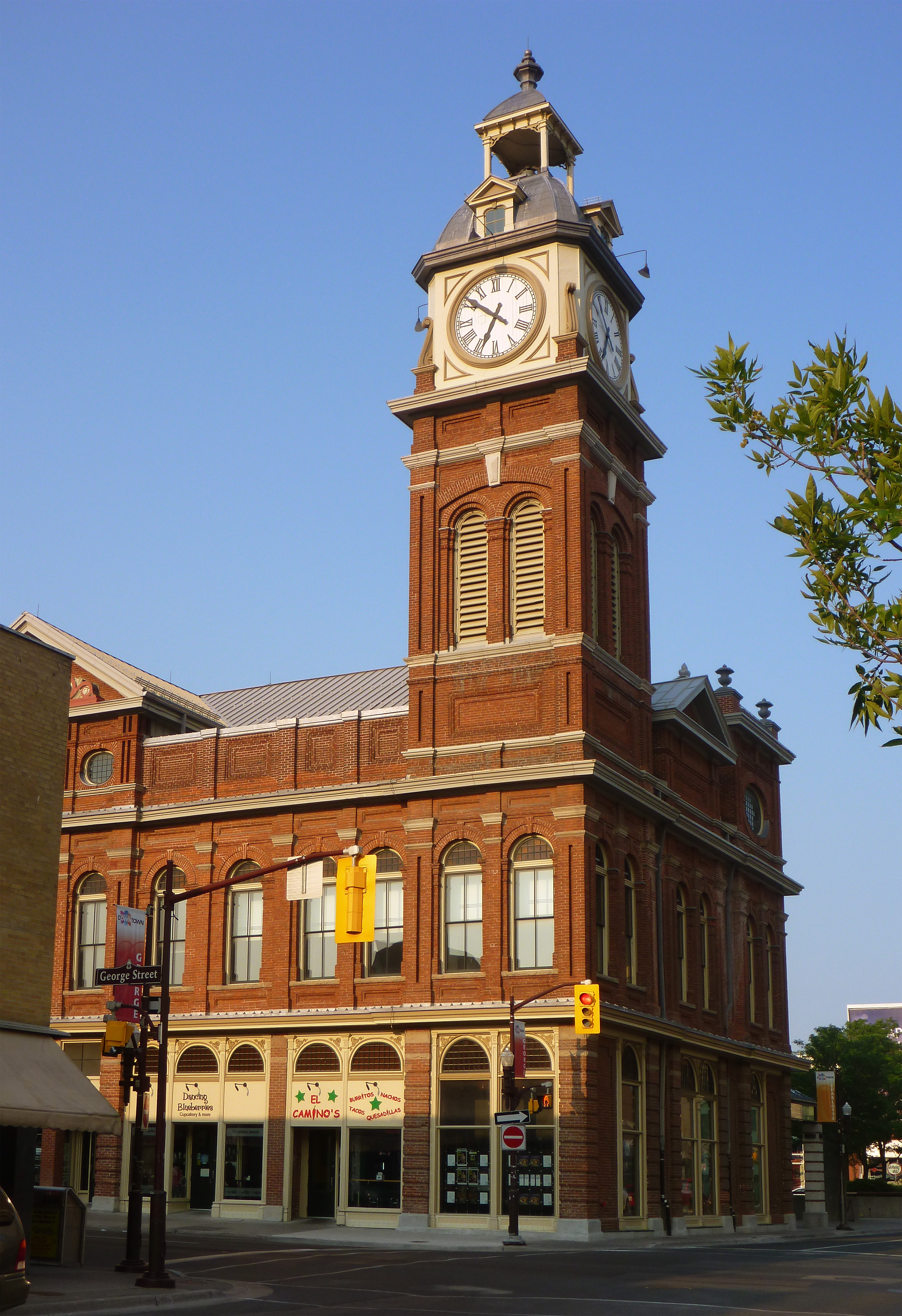
- Market Hall in 2011
- Interactive map of the Market Hall area

General information
- Architectural style: Italianate
- Location: 140 Charlotte Street; Peterborough, Ontario; K9J 2T8
- Coordinates: 44°18′13.428″N 78°19′10.452″W
- Groundbreaking: 1889
- Opened: 1890

Design and construction
- Architect: John E. Belcher

Website
- markethall.org

Market Hall is a commercial building and performing arts centre in the downtown core of Peterborough, Ontario, Canada. Originally built as the city's market hall, it has housed a variety of tenants since and has been home to the Market Hall Performing Arts Centre since 1998.

Market Hall is the work of prominent local architect John E. Belcher in the Italianate style and is one of few surviving 19th-century market halls in Ontario. The clock tower is a local landmark. The building is designated by the City of Peterborough under Part IV of the Ontario Heritage Act by By-Law 1977-78 as being of cultural heritage value or interest.

== History ==
In 1889, Peterborough's town council approved plans for the construction of a new market hall. The building was to replace an earlier market hall on Water Street built in 1851. The cornerstone was laid on 26 November 1889 by Mayor James Stevenson. The hall was constructed by Thomas Rutherford at a cost of $11,000.

The building was completed and opened in 1890. The ground floor houses commercial storefronts while the upper floor served as an indoor market space until the 1950s. After the market left, the second floor housed a gymnasium until the 1980s.

In the 1970s, as part of the Ontario Downtown Renewal Program, the department store Eaton's partnered with the provincial government to build shopping malls in the downtown cores of the province's smaller cities, including Peterborough. Market Hall was threatened with demolition during the plans for Peterborough Square but was eventually the only building on the block to be saved and incorporated into the shopping mall.

In 1984, the gymnasium on the upper level was converted into a multidisciplinary artist-run centre by Artspace, an artists' centre directed by David Bierk. Due to funding issues, Artspace was forced to drop the performance aspect of its programming and abandon Market Hall in the early 1990s. Arbor Theatre became its primary tenant in the early 1990s. At the same time Public Energy Performing Arts (then Peterborough New Dance) was established to fill the void of Artspace's performance program, using Market Hall as its chief venue. By 1997 there was no primary tenant to manage the venue and plans were put in place to convert it to a bingo hall. The Friends of Market Hall was formed and incorporated as the Market Hall Performing Arts Centre. Professor Thomas Symons launched a successful campaign to raise funds for renovations of the building.

In 2011, a $10 million restoration was undertaken. The 'Hall' on the second floor was restored and a 350-seat performance venue was inserted. The newly renovated Market Hall was unveiled on 31 March 2011.
