= St. John the Evangelist Anglican Church (Peterborough, Ontario) =

Church of St. John the Evangelist
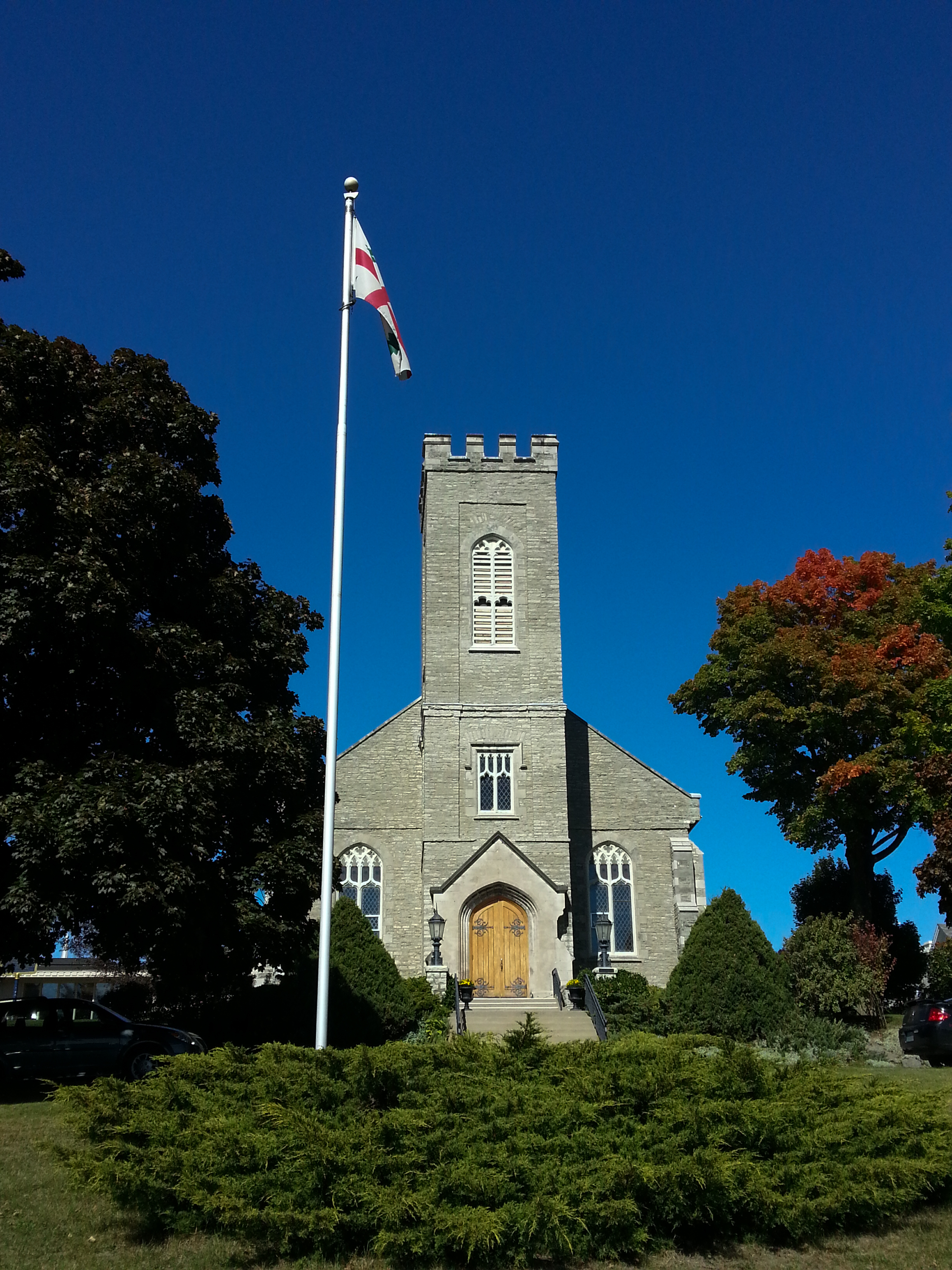
- The church in 2014
- Church of St. John the Evangelist
- 44°18′24.4″N 78°19′04.3″W
- Location: 99 Brock Street; Peterborough, Ontario, Canada
- Denomination: Anglican Church of Canada
- Website: stjohnspeterborough.ca/home

History
- Founded: 1826; 200 years ago
- Founder: The Rev. Samuel Armour
- Dedication: St. John the Evangelist

Architecture
- Architect: William Coverdale
- Style: Gothic Revival
- Years built: 1835–1837

Administration
- Province: Ontario
- Diocese: Toronto
- Archdeaconry: East
- Deanery: Peterborough

Clergy
- Rector: The Rev. Canon Brad Smith

St. John the Evangelist Anglican Church is an Anglican church in downtown Peterborough, Ontario.

Designed by William Coverdale and constructed in 1835–1837, it is considered one of the earliest stone Gothic Revival Anglican churches in Canada. It is designated as being of cultural heritage value under Part IV of the Ontario Heritage Act by the City of Peterborough by-law 1977–78.

== History ==
St. John the Evangelist Anglican Church was founded in 1826 as a mission of the Diocese of Quebec by the newly ordained deacon Samuel Armour in what was then Scott's Plains, today Peterborough. Armour began services in the local schoolhouse organized by the Hon. Thomas A. Stewart and his wife, Frances.

The congregation was granted its current lot in 1834 and the cornerstone for the present building was laid in 1835 by Captain Charles Rubidge (1787–1872). £700 had been raised by the Stewarts for the construction of the church. The church, built from locally quarried stone, was designed by William Coverdale in the Gothic Revival style. Coverdale's design was adapted from John W. Howard's design for a small church. The first service was held in the new church in February 1837.

In 1878, a parish hall was added to the west of the building. A major renovation in 1882 added the sacristy and chancel wing. Other architects who have overseen later alterations and additions include Kivas Tully, John E. Belcher, William Blackwell and Craig, Zeidler and Strong.

The church's carillon, known as the "People's Chime", was purchased by subscription by 1,600 people. It was dedicated on June 22, 1911, the day of the coronation of King George V. It has played to mark the coronation of every Canadian monarch since.

In January 2018, the parish amalgamated with St. Barnabas Anglican Church upon the latter's closure.

== Gallery ==
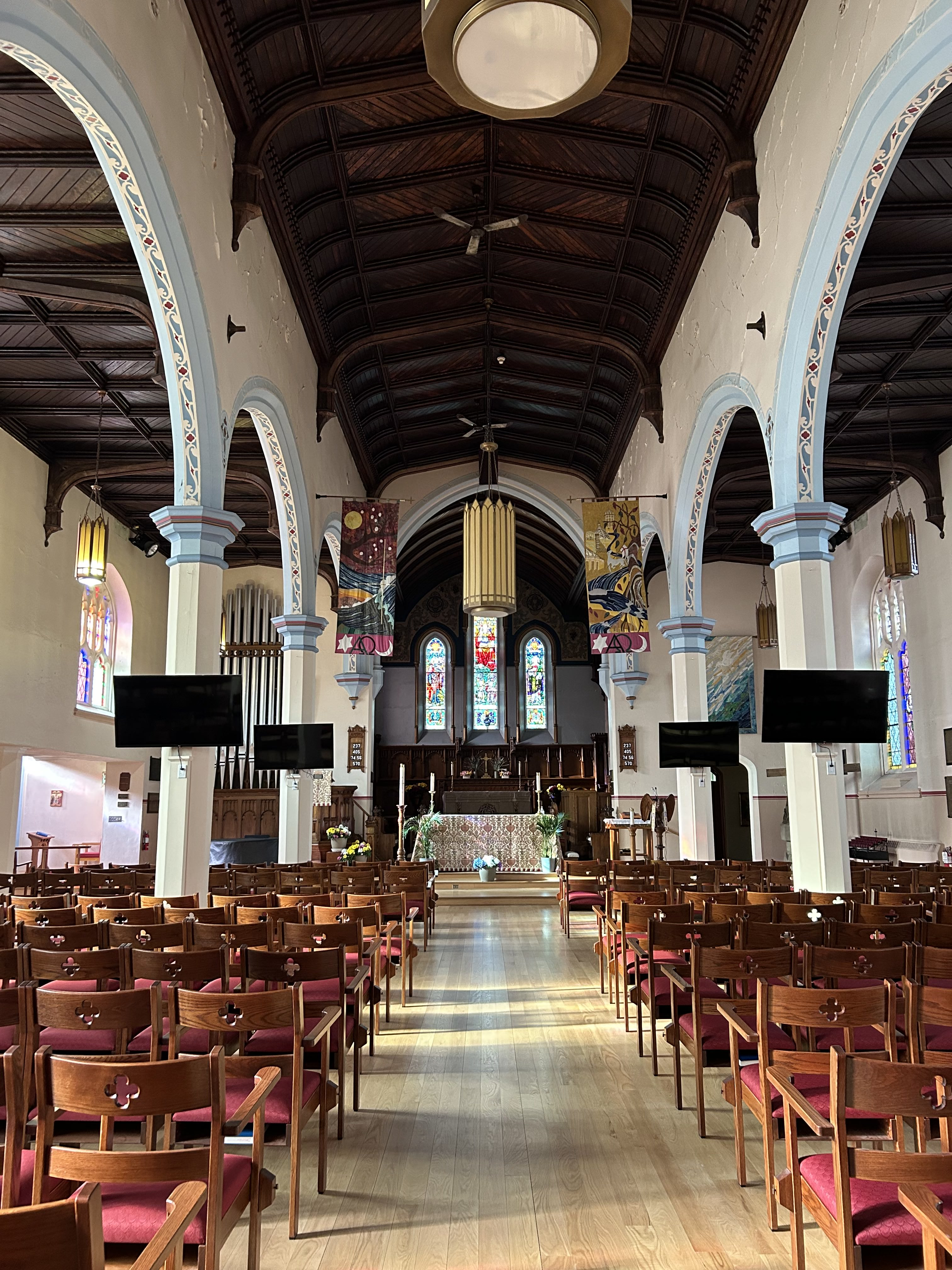
The interior

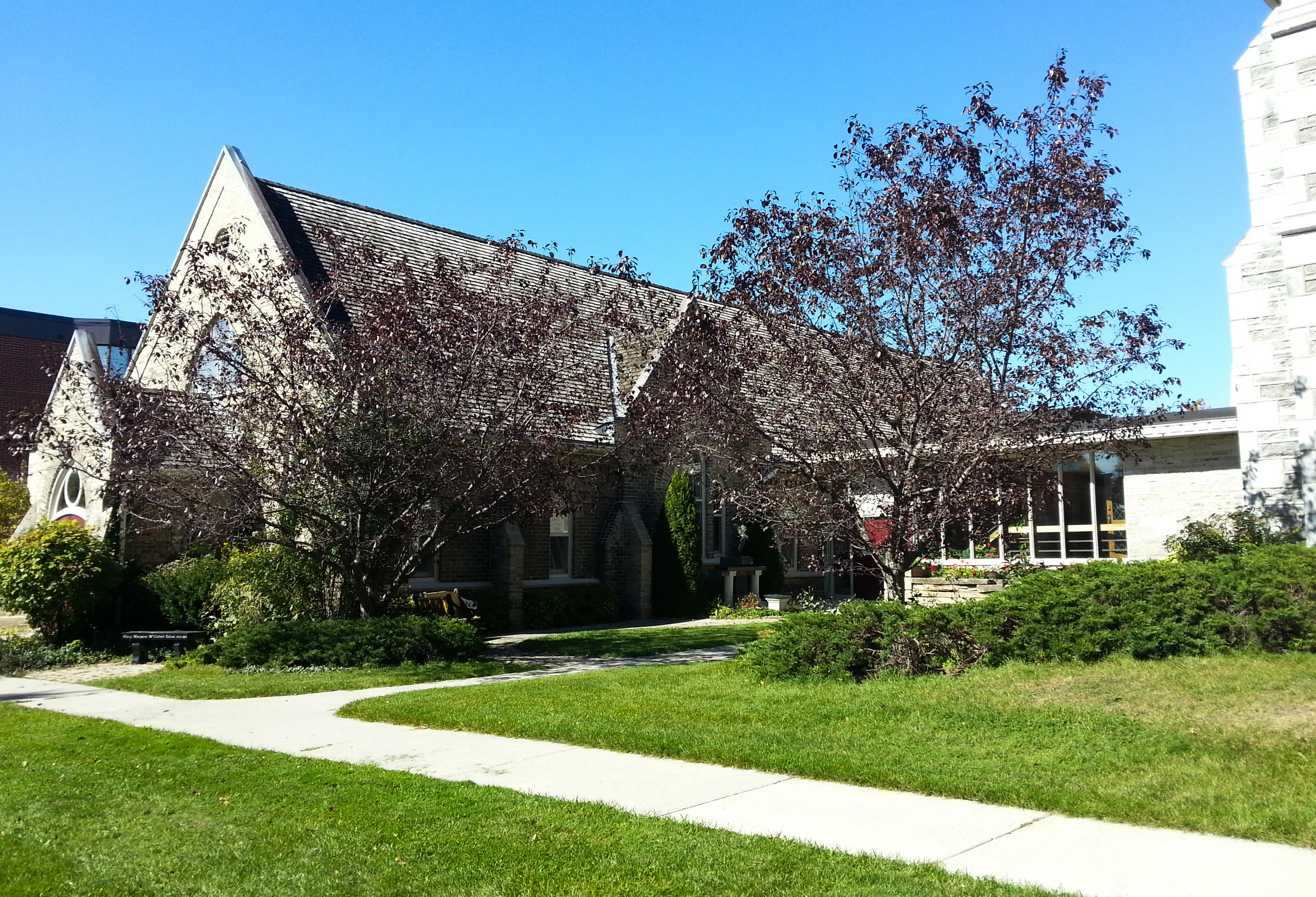
The Guild Hall
