= Peterborough Public Library =

Public library system in Peterborough, Ontario, Canada

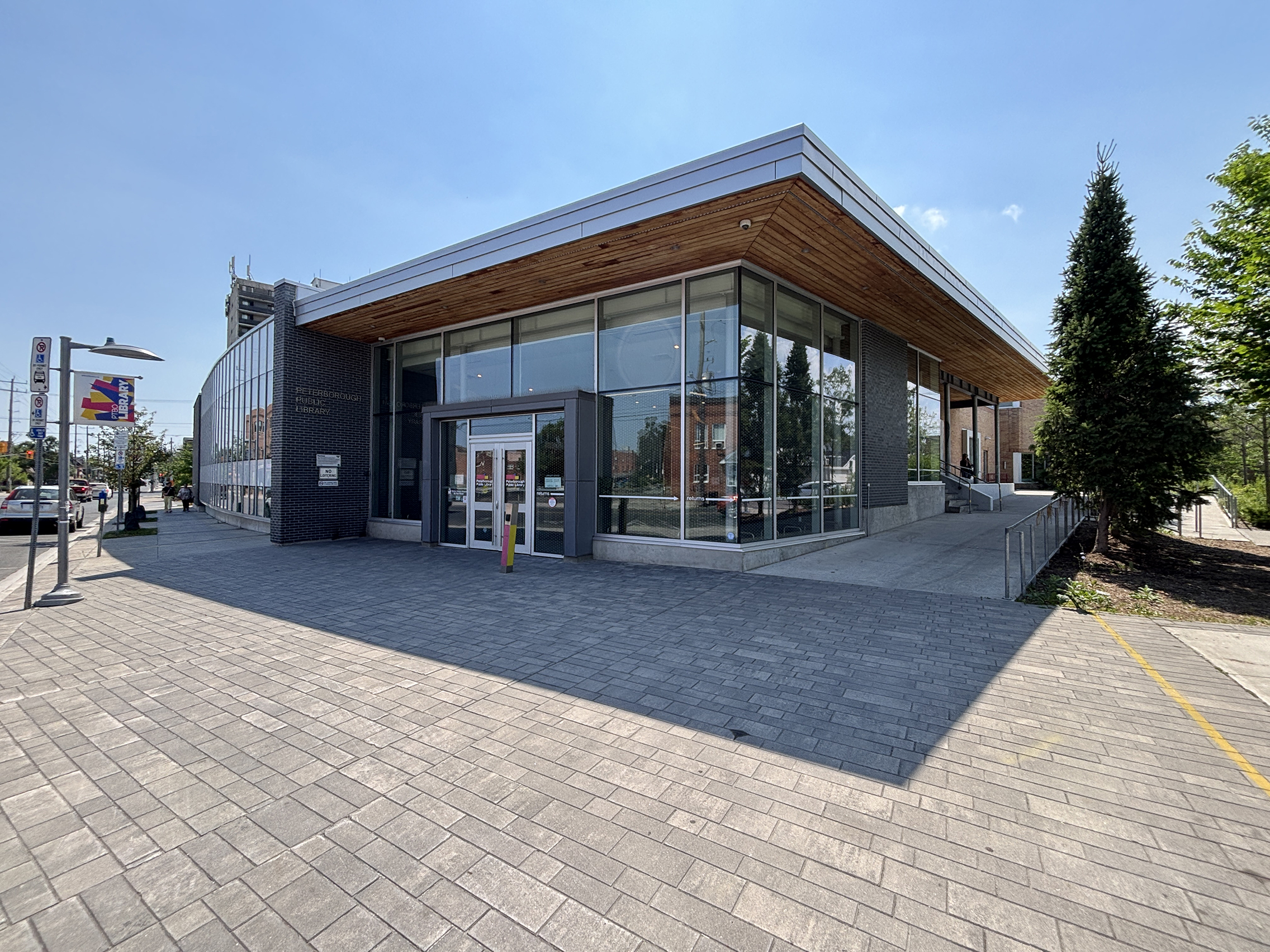
- Aylmer St main branch building after the renovation in 2017
- 44°18′15″N 78°19′09″W Coordinates of temporary main branch at Peterborough Square
- Location: 345 Aylmer Street North; Peterborough, Ontario; K9H 3V7
- Type: Public Library
- Established: 1868
- Branches: 2

Collection
- Items collected: business directories, phone books, maps, government publications, books, periodicals, genealogy, local history,

Other information
- Website: www.ptbolibrary.ca

The Peterborough Public Library is a public library system in Peterborough, Ontario, Canada.

== Services ==
The Main Library is a full-service library with a current circulating collection of books, CD audiobooks, Music, DVDs and magazines. The collection also includes a local history collection, digital resources and microfilm selected to answer the information needs of the community. The Library shares its local history collection space with the Kawartha Branch of the Ontario Genealogical Society. Volunteers of the group offer genealogical research assistance through special programs and email queries.

Additional material can be obtained from other libraries and for those who are unable to come to the library, visiting library services are offered. A variety of programs are available for the public to attend. Access to the Internet is possible via the library's workstations. Visit the Children's area for storytime programs, play a game on one of the computers, or to grab a book to read together.

List of services: Information and reference services, community information, Internet access, reader's advisory services, programs for adults and children of all ages, library materials delivery to home-bound individuals, Interlibrary loan, free downloadable electronic materials, and much more.

== History ==
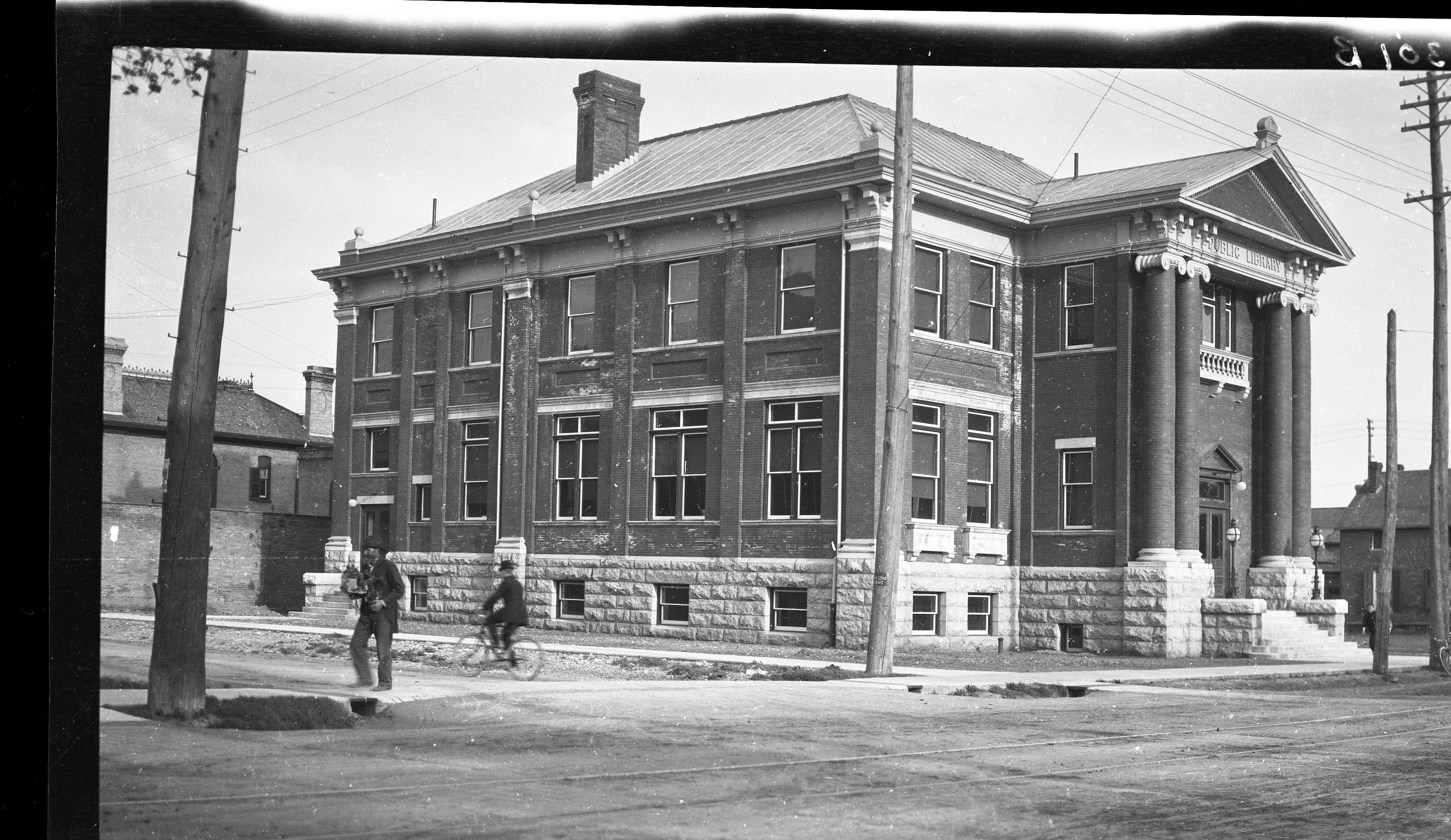
The Carnegie Library built in 1911 fronting George Street

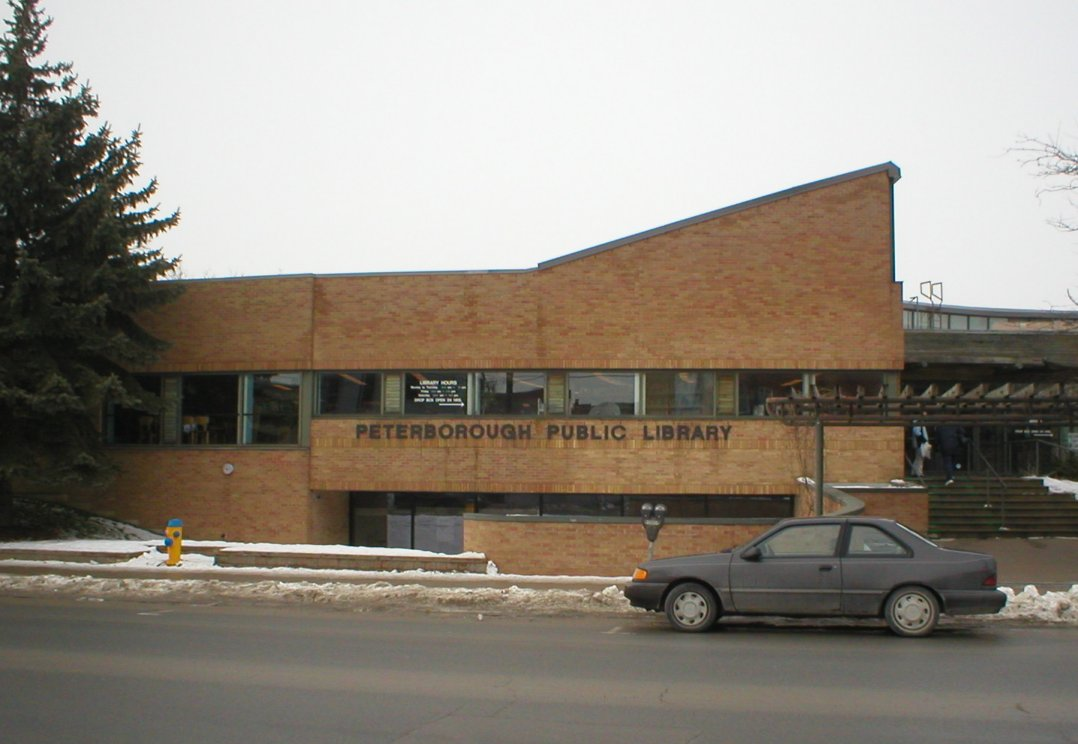
Aylmer St main branch building opened in 1980, prior to 2017 renovations.

Peterborough Mechanics Institute, established in 1868, was one of a series of Mechanic's Institutes that were set up around the world after becoming popular in Britain. The Peterborough Mechanics Institute housed a subscription library that allowed members who paid a fee to borrow books. Mechanics Institutes were established across Ontario to make education universal and accessible to all citizens. The Mechanic's Institutes libraries eventually became public libraries when the establishment of free libraries occurred. In Peterborough, the Institute and the Library was located on Water Street. In May 1895, the Mechanics Institute became the Peterborough Public Library. The library remained on Water Street. Later, the Peterborough Public Library received funding from the Andrew Carnegie Foundation and the new Carnegie Library located on George Street opened in 1911. This building is currently the Carnegie Wing of City Hall.

== Branches ==
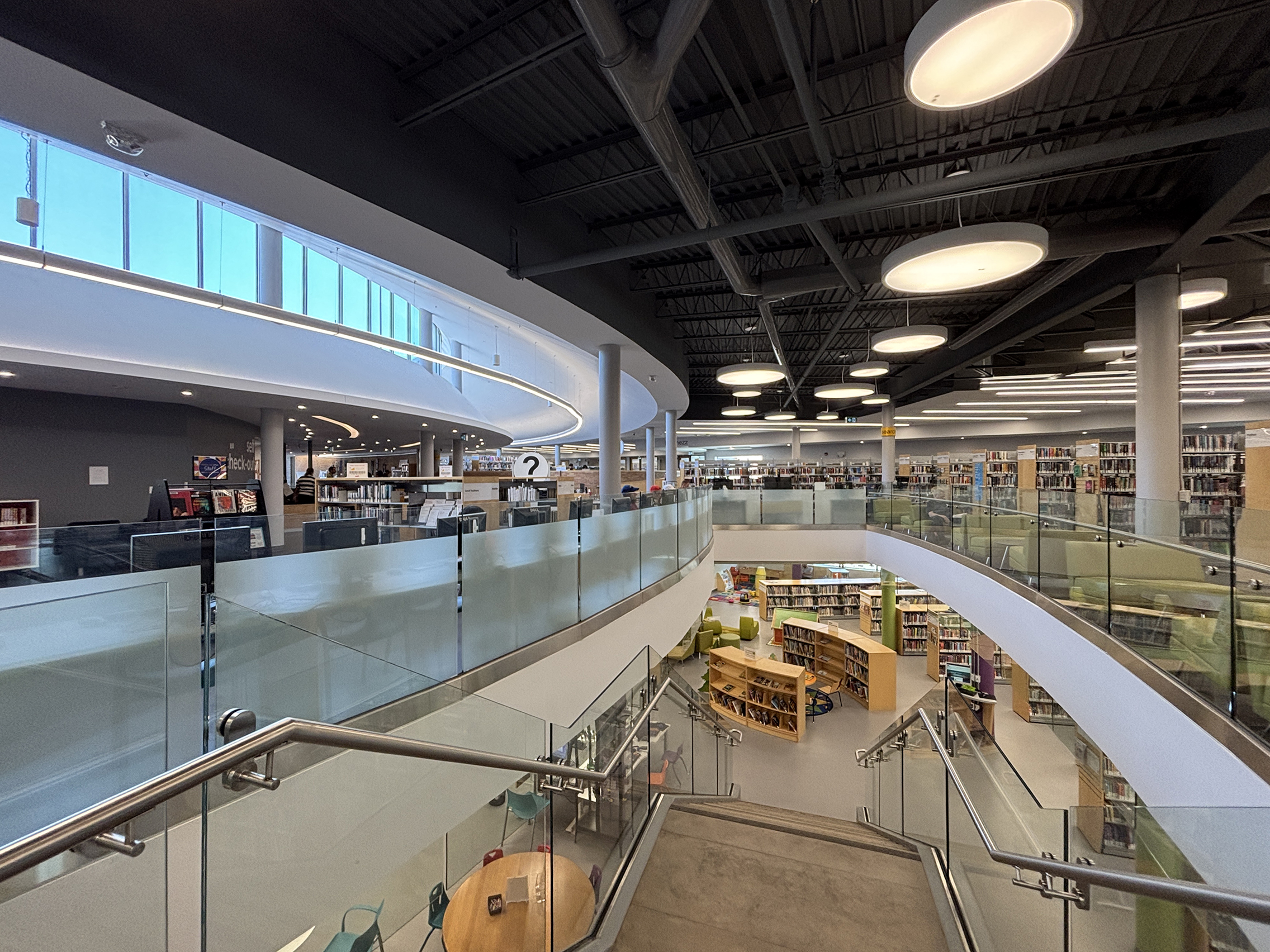
Main Library interior after renovation

In February 1949, a branch library opened in the south end of Peterborough. It was situated above a hardware store and was a room 50 by 20 feet. It was divided into two sections – one for boys and girls, the other for adults. The DelaFosse Branch Library opened officially on December 1, 1965. The Peterborough Examiner declared that this branch at 729 Park Street S., made "south end residents the envy of the rest of the city." Currently, it holds a recreational reading collection of approximately 14,000 books and a variety of media formats for all ages.

This branch library is named in honour of Frederick Montague DelaFosse, who was the Chief Librarian of Peterborough Public Library from 1910 to 1946.

In January 2022, Peterborough City Council voted to close the aging DelaFosse branch and replace it with a modernized facility in the proposed Twin Pad arena at Morrow Park. The DelaFosse has been closed to the public since the start of the pandemic and will not be reopening at this location.

The Main Library, designed by Moriyama and Teshima Architects, at 345 Aylmer St. N. opened on Tuesday, September 2, 1980. The library was built on the site of the old fire hall and had about triple the floor space of the old Carnegie building. The opening ceremonies were held on September 17 and featured Robertson Davies, Master of Massey College, University of Toronto, who was the keynote speaker. A report in 2013 determined that the Aylmer St building no longer met community needs, and the city council of Peterborough in 2015 approved the renovation of the building at the Aylmer St site. +VG Architects was contracted for the project. This included an addition and renovation of the facade on the front of the building and the installation of a central staircase that created another access point between the upper and lower levels. A temporary Main Location at the Peterborough Square complex opened in May 2016, and renovation of the old Aylmer St building began in July 2016.

On January 30, 2018, the renovated Peterborough Public Library opened to the public.

== Trivia ==
- A scene from Jumper was filmed here

== See also ==
- Ask Ontario
- Ontario Public Libraries
- List of Carnegie libraries in Canada
