= Richard Alphonsus O'Connor =

- Bishop of Peterborough
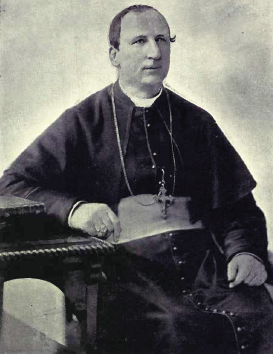
- Diocese: Peterborough
- Installed: 1889
- Term ended: 1913
- Predecessor: Thomas Joseph Dowling
- Successor: Richard Michael Joseph O'Brien

Personal details
- Born: April 15, 1838 Listowel, County Kerry, Ireland
- Died: January 23, 1913 (aged 74) Peterborough, Ontario, Canada

Richard Alphonsus O'Connor (April 15, 1838 – January 23, 1913) was a Canadian priest and Bishop of Peterborough, Ontario.

== Biography ==
Born in Listowel, County Kerry, Ireland on April 15, 1838, O'Connor emigrated to Canada with his parents in 1841, settling in Toronto. He received his early education in the Toronto separate schools, and in 1852, entered St. Michael's College School in Toronto. In 1859, he entered the Grand Seminary of St. Sulpice, Montreal, to complete his theological course. He was ordained priest August 2, 1861, in St. Michael's Cathedral, Toronto, by Archbishop John Joseph Lynch. His first charge after ordination was as assistant priest at Toronto Gore, and in January 1862, he was appointed pastor of that mission. In December 1865, he was transferred to Niagara Falls mission, and in September 1868, he was entrusted with the parish of South Adjala, Ont. In October 1870, he was made Dean of Barrie, where he remained for over eighteen years, taking a leading position in educational matters. He was consecrated bishop in St. Peter's Cathedral, Peterborough on May 1, 1889.

He died in Peterborough on January 23, 1913.
