= Robert Schofield Morris =

Canadian architect

- Born: 14 November 1898; Hamilton, Ontario
- Died: 5 June 1964 (aged 65); Ottawa, Ontario
- Education: McGill University (BArch 1923)
- Spouse: Elsie Strachan Johnston (m. 1948)

Robert Schofield Morris (14 November 1898 – 5 June 1964) was a Canadian architect and partner at the Toronto-based architectural firm Marani & Morris, one of the leading firms in the country from the 1930s-50s. Morris is one of only two Canadian architects in history to have received the prestigious RIBA Gold Medal from the Royal Institute of British Architects.

== Biography ==
Morris was born in Hamilton, Ontario and studied at Ashbury College in Ottawa and the Royal Military College in Kingston, before joining the Canadian Army to fight during World War I. After the War, in 1919, he began studying at the School of Architecture at McGill University, graduating in 1923. Upon graduation, he moved to New York City and worked at Carrère and Hastings from 1924-1925 and then with Harrie T. Lindeberg until 1927, when he returned to Montreal to work as a draftsman for architect and McGill Architecture professor Harold Lea Fetherstonhaugh.

In 1929, Morris moved to Toronto to become a partner at Ferdinand H. Marani's new architectural firm, which was subsequently called Marani & Morris and eventually became one of the leading architectural firms in Canada. Morris became the president of the Ontario Association of Architects in 1942, and competed in the art competitions at the 1948 Summer Olympics, where he received an honorable mention. He served as president of the Royal Architectural Institute of Canada from 1952-1954, and during his tenure, he was nominated as a Fellow of the Royal Institute of British Architects by Howard Robertson, who also put Morris' name forward for the RIBA Gold Medal. In 1958, he became the second Canadian in history to win this award, which in the past had been awarded to architects such as Eugène Viollet-le-Duc (1864), Frank Lloyd Wright (1941), Le Corbusier (1953) and Walter Gropius (1956). Morris became a member of the Royal Canadian Academy in 1959.

Morris died unexpectedly in Ottawa, Ontario on June 5, 1964, at age 66 while looking over his firm's recent work on the Bank of Canada Building.
