= Cathedral of St. Peter-in-Chains =

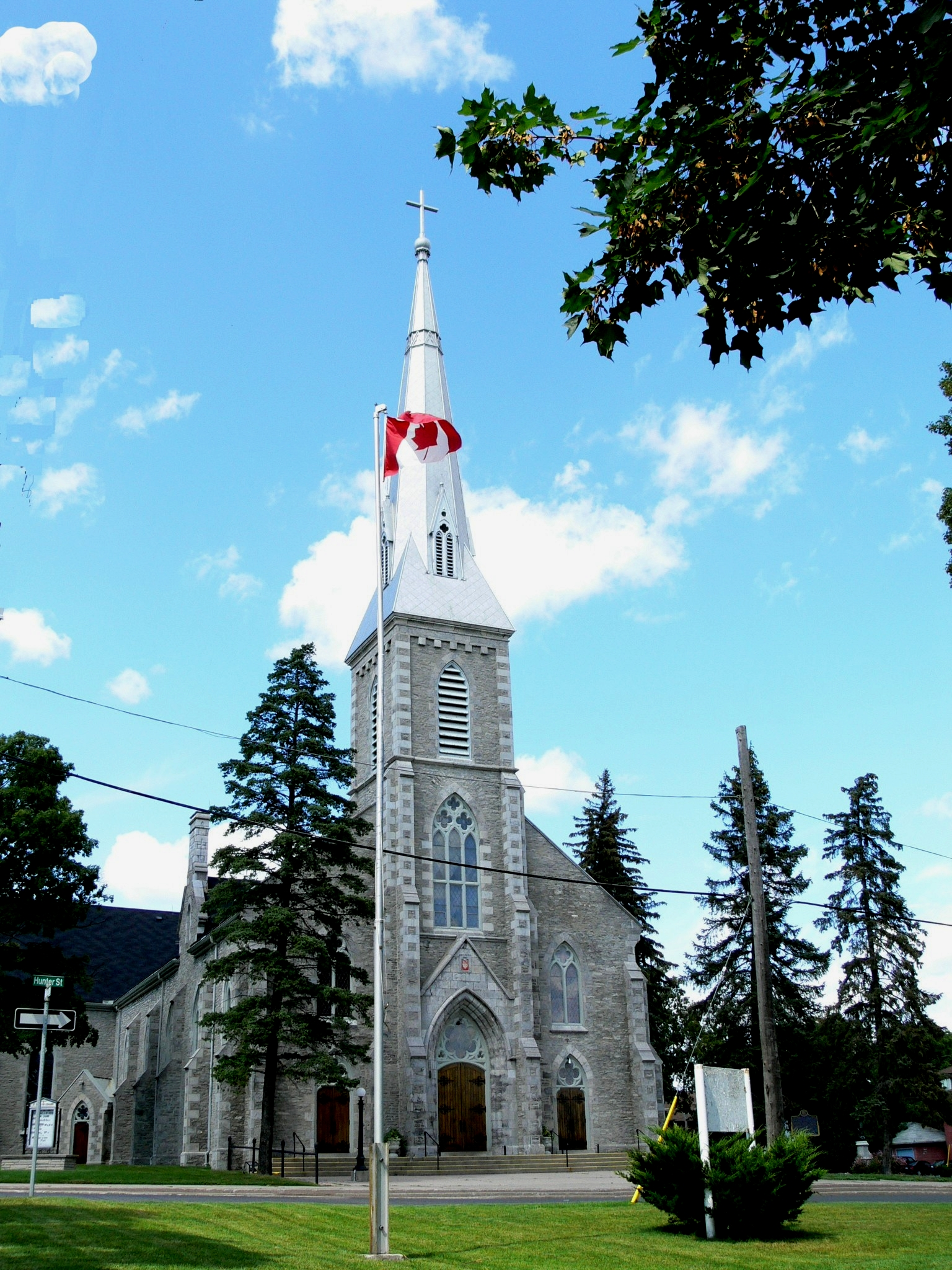
- The Cathedral of St. Peter-in-Chains in 2014

- Location in southern Ontario
- 44°18′20″N 78°19′39″W
- Location: 411 Reid Street; Peterborough, Ontario; K9J 6Y8
- Country: Canada
- Denomination: Roman Catholic
- Website: stpeterspeterborough.ca

History
- Status: Cathedral
- Dedication: St. Peter ad vincula
- Dedicated: September 21, 1825

Architecture
- Heritage designation: Ontario Provincial Plaque
- Architect: James Chevette
- Style: Gothic Revival
- Years built: 1837–1838

Administration
- Archdiocese: Kingston
- Diocese: Peterborough

Clergy
- Bishop: The Most Rev. Daniel J. Miehm
- Rector: Fr. Thomas Lynch

The Cathedral of St. Peter-in-Chains is the cathedral church of the Roman Catholic Diocese of Peterborough, Ontario, and one of the oldest Catholic churches in Ontario. It is located at 411 Reid Street in Peterborough, Ontario, Canada. St. Peter's was designed by James Chevette in the Gothic Revival style. It was elevated to a cathedral in 1882.

== History ==
Roman Catholic services in Peterborough were first held in a log building in 1825. The parish of St. Peter's was established in 1826 to serve the large Irish population in the area. A wood church was later erected but it was destroyed by fire in 1835 or 1836. What is now the nave portion of the cathedral was erected in 1837 with stone quarried in nearby Jackson Park. Further alterations from 1884–1886 added the transept/sanctuary space and sacristy to the north end. The roof over the high altar was raised to correspond with the height of the nave in 1931. In 1967, the south wall was extended to the front façade of the tower adding a 5th bay to the original structure.

In 1882, the Roman Catholic Diocese of Peterborough was established and St. Peter's became its cathedral. Jean-François Jamot was installed as the diocese's first bishop and he is now buried in the crypt. Until 1908, it was the only Catholic church serving Peterborough and the surrounding communities of Smith, Douro, Otonobee and North Monaghan.

== Architecture ==
The current building was designed in a cruciform, modified English Gothic Revival style, then popular in Upper Canada, by James Chevette. The vaulted ceiling was added in the 1931 renovation and is supported by Corinthian columns. Despite later alterations, it retains much of its original style and is an excellent example of Gothic Revival architecture in Canada.

On the back wall of the chancel, there is a 13 m (42 ft) tall, 7.6 m (25 ft) wide mosaic of the Last Supper by Alexander von Svoboda installed in 1968. It is made from about 0.6 million pieces of cut glass in 75 different hues and colours.

== Gallery ==
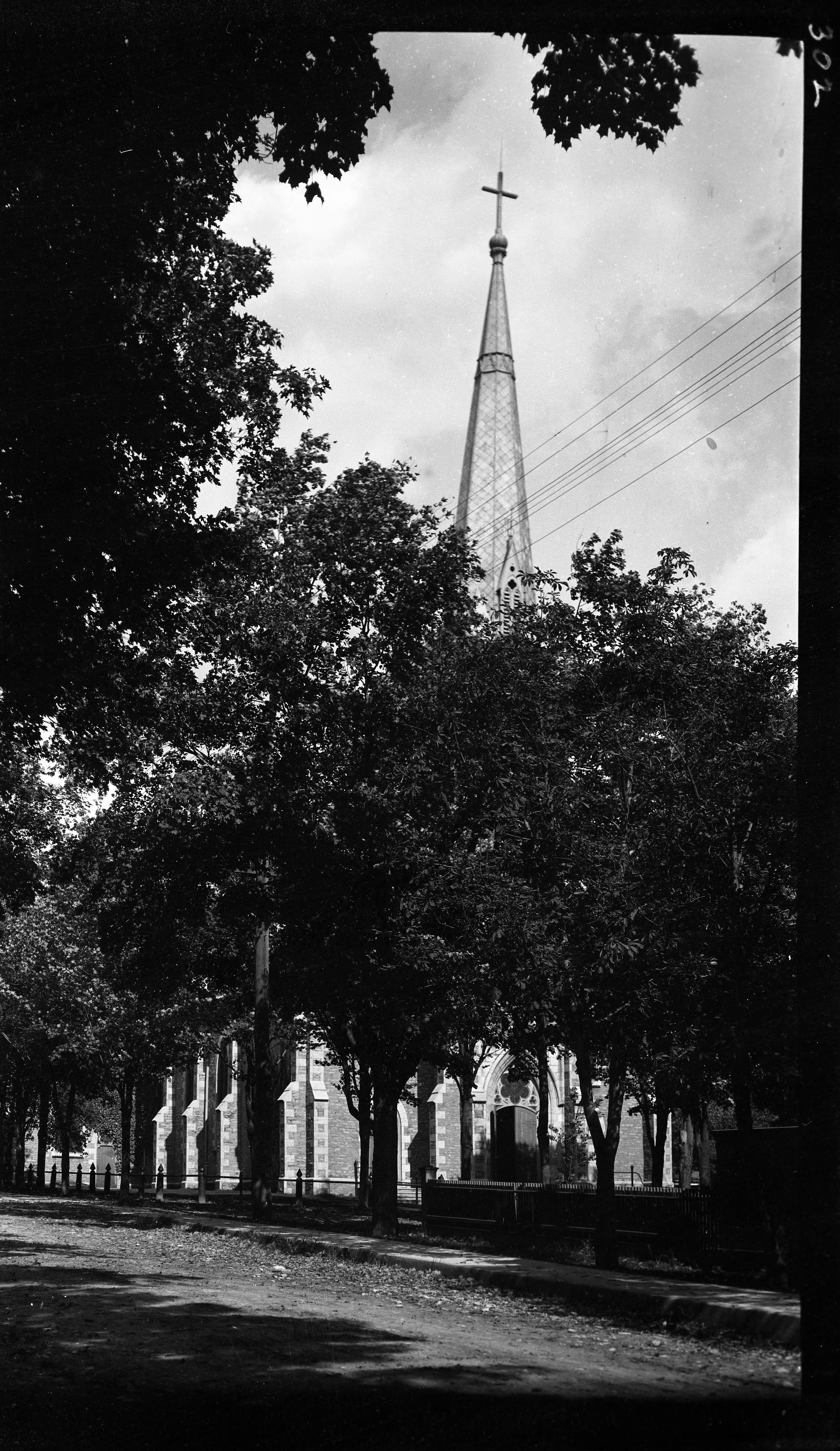
The Cathedral in 1911

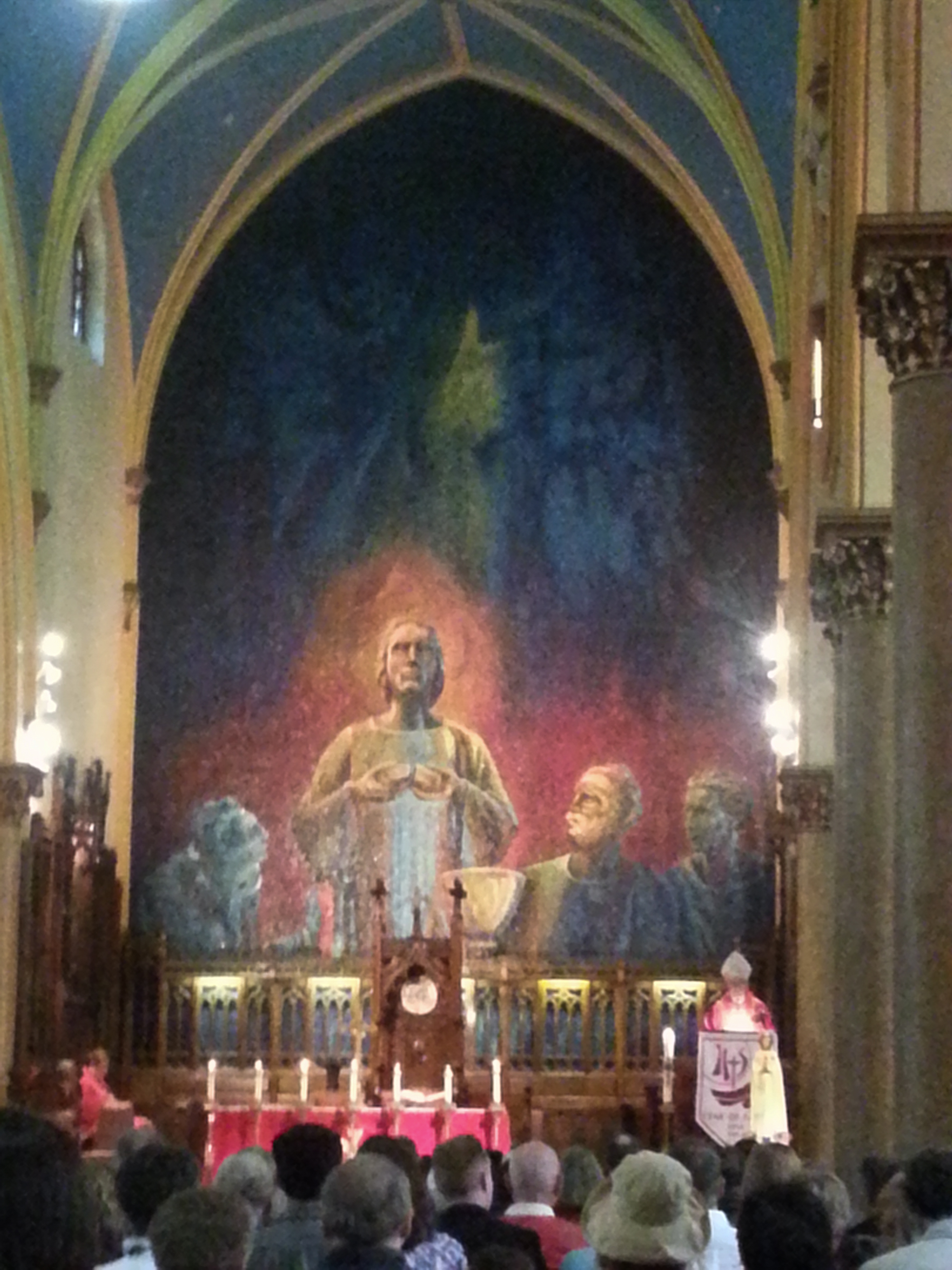
The Last Supper mosaic by Alexander von Svoboda

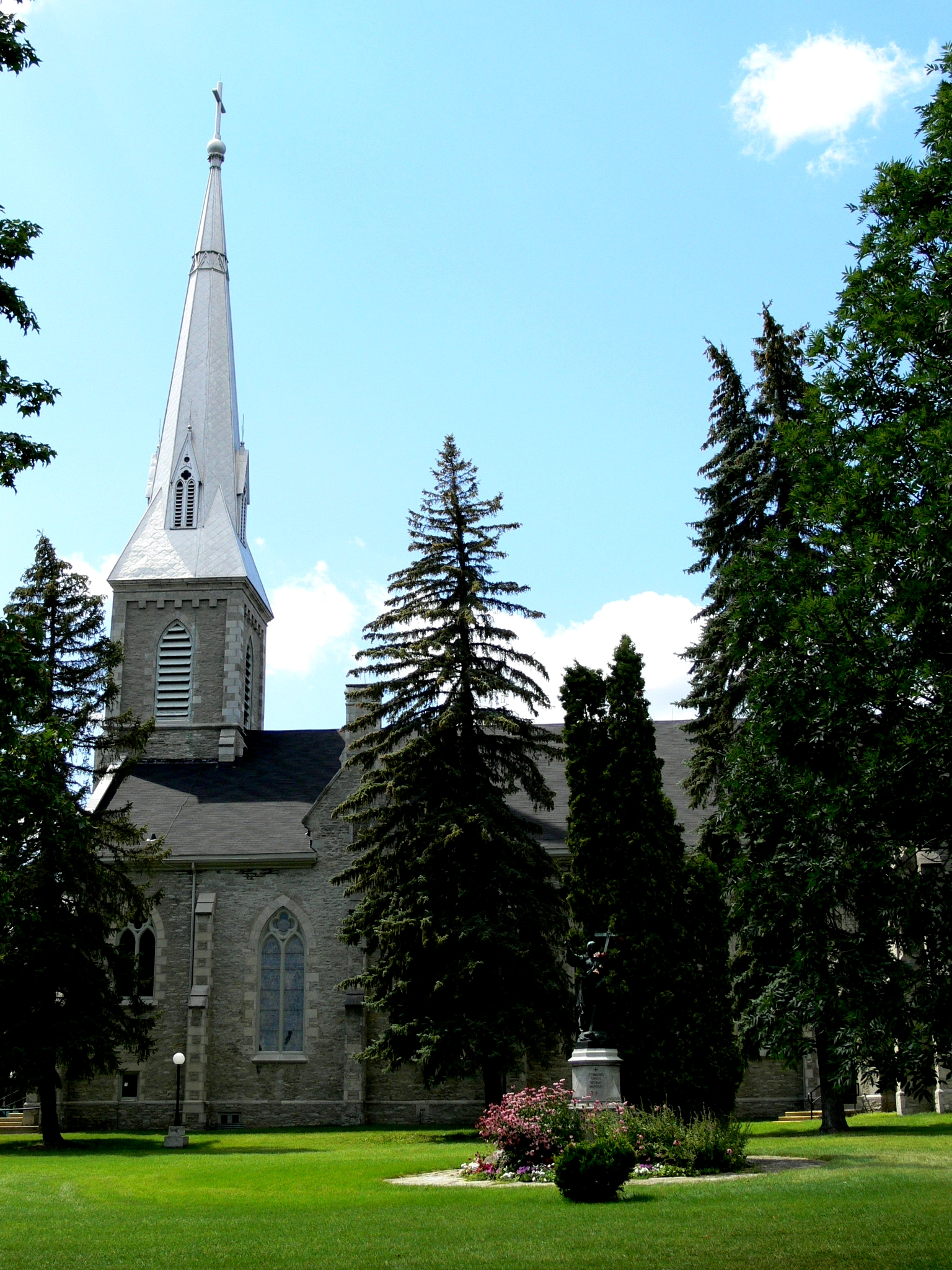
The east façade of the cathedral from Rubidge Street

== See also ==
- List of cathedrals in Canada
- Roman Catholic Diocese of Peterborough
- Gothic Revival architecture in Canada
- Media related to Cathedral of St. Peter in Chains (Peterborough, Ontario) at Wikimedia Commons
