= Jackson Park (Peterborough, Ontario) =

Park in Peterborough, Ontario, Canada

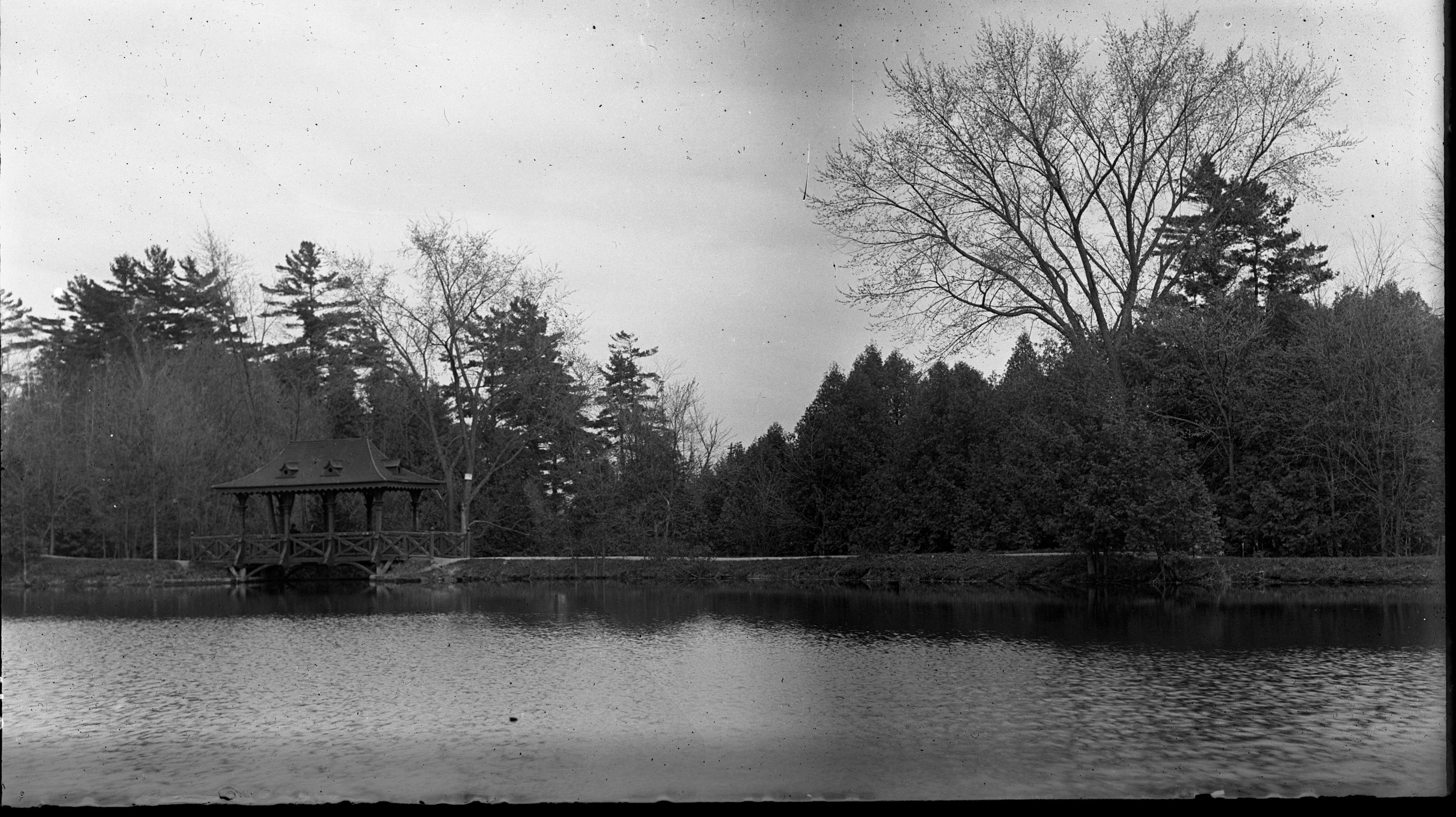
- Interactive map of Jackson Park
- Location: Peterborough, Ontario, Canada
- Coordinates: 44.3122°N 78.3384°W

Jackson Park is a park in Peterborough, Ontario, in existence since the 1890s. Jackson Creek passes through it. Stone was once quarried on the site. A skating rink and a toboggan slide were winter attractions, established in the 1900s. It was served by a streetcar line until around 1926 or 1927.
