= Roman Catholic Diocese of Peterborough =

Latin Catholic territory in Canada

Diocese of Peterborough Dioecesis Peterboroughensis
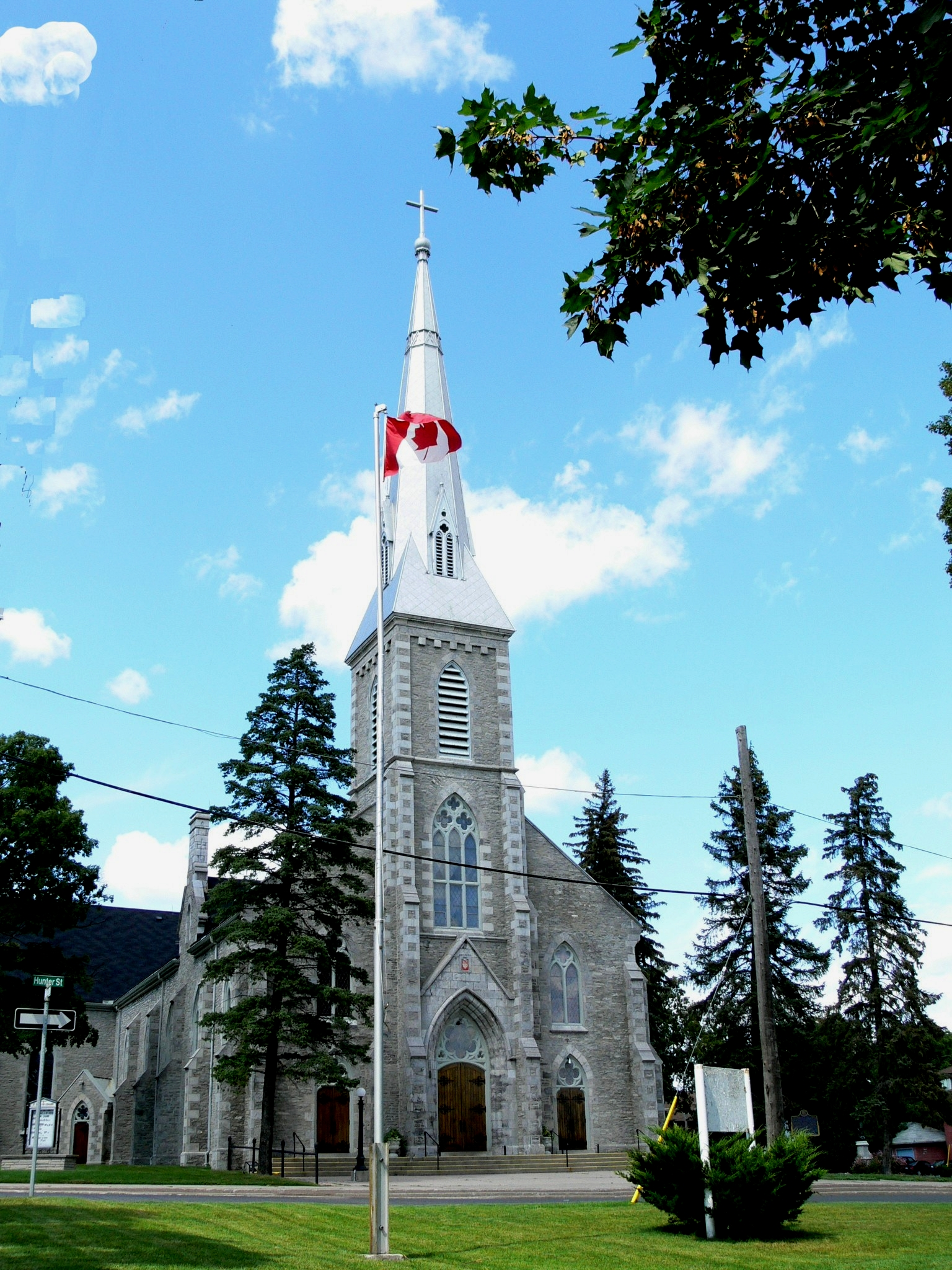
- The Cathedral of St. Peter-in-Chains, Peterborough

Location
- Country: Canada
- Ecclesiastical province: Kingston

Statistics
- Population: (as of 2026); over 100,000 (Note: Diocese reported serving over 100,000 in 2026)
- Parishes: 40

Information
- Denomination: Catholic Church
- Sui iuris church: Latin Church
- Rite: Roman Rite
- Established: July 11, 1882
- Cathedral: St. Peter-in-Chains
- Patron saint: St. Peter & St. Patrick

Current leadership
- Pope: Leo XIV
- Bishop: Most Rev. Wayne Lawrence Lobsinger
- Metropolitan Archbishop: Most Rev. Michael Mulhall
- Vicar General: Msgr. Michael Heffernan

Map

Website
- peterboroughdiocese.org

The Diocese of Peterborough (Latin: Dioecesis Peterboroughensis) is a Latin Church ecclesiastical territory or diocese of the Catholic Church in Ontario, Canada. It is a suffragan in the ecclesiastical province of the metropolitan Archdiocese of Kingston, Ontario.

Its episcopal see is the Cathedral of St. Peter-in-Chains in Peterborough, Ontario.

== History ==
Established on 25 January 1874 as Apostolic Vicariate of Northern Canada, on territory split off from the Diocese of Kingston in Ontario, the Diocese of Peterborough was first established July 11, 1882 by Pope Leo XIII.

== Statistics and extent ==
In 2006, the diocese contained 88,741 Catholics in 43 parishes, 104 priests, 9 religious priests, 101 Women Religious and 12 deacons.

In 2014, it pastorally served 61,700 Catholics (13.8% of 447,000 total) on 25,900 km^{2} in 40 parishes and a mission with 69 priests (56 diocesan, 13 religious), 8 deacons, 92 lay religious (13 brothers, 79 sisters) and 2 seminarians.

In 2023, diocese pastorally served 77,500 (17.6% of 440,300 total) in 40 parishes and a mission with 71 priests (61 diocesan and 13 religious), and 18 deacons.

As of 2026, the diocese pastorally serves over 100,000 Catholics in 40 parishes and a mission with over 80 priests, and 21 deacons (18 active permanent and 3 retired permanent).

The Diocese of Peterborough includes the Muskoka and Parry Sound Districts, the counties of Peterborough, Northumberland, and Victoria, that portion of the Regional District of Durham which formally was the County of Durham and five townships of the County of Haliburton.

== Bishops ==
(all Roman Rite)

Apostolic Vicar of Northern Canada

- Jean-François Jamot (born France) (3 February 1874 - 11 July 1882 see below), Titular Bishop of Sarepta (1874.02.03 – 1882.07.11)

Suffragan Bishops of Peterborough

- Jean-François Jamot (see above 11 July 1882 - death 4 May 1886)
- Thomas Joseph Dowling (14 December 1886 - 11 January 1889) (Note: next Bishop of Hamilton (Ontario, Canada) (1889.01.11 – death 1924.08.06))
- Richard Alphonsus O’Connor (born Ireland) (11 January 1889 - death 23 January 1913)
- Richard Michael Joseph O'Brien (20 June 1913 - 17 May 1929) (Note: next Titular Archbishop of Amorium (1929.05.17 – 1938.02.23) as Coadjutor Archbishop of Kingston (1929.05.17 – 1938.02.23), succeeding as Metropolitan Archbishop of Kingston (Ontario, Canada) (1938.02.23 – death 1943.08.30))
- Dennis P. O'Connor (30 January 1930 - death 30 August 1942)
- John Roderick MacDonald (5 June 1943 - 14 April 1945) (Note: next Titular Bishop of Ancusa (1945.04.14 – 1950.04.13) as Coadjutor Bishop of Antigonish (Canada) (1945.04.14 – 1950.04.13), succeeding as Bishop of Antigonish (1950.04.13 – death 1959.12.18))
- Joseph Gerald Berry (7 April 1945 - 28 November 1953) (Note: next Metropolitan Archbishop of Halifax (Canada) (1953.11.28 – 1967.05.12) and President of Canadian Conference of Catholic Bishops (1960 – 1964))
- Benjamin Ibberson Webster (born England) (24 April 1954 - retired 12 March 1968) (Note: previously Titular Bishop of Paphus (1946.09.24 – 1954.04.24) as Auxiliary Bishop of Toronto (Ontario, Canada) (1946.09.24 – 1954.04.24); emeritate as Titular Bishop of Tigamibena (1968.03.12 – death 1981.01.18))
- Francis Anthony Marrocco (10 June 1968 – death 18 July 1975) (Note: previously Titular Bishop of Limnæ (in Pisidia) (1955.12.01 – 1968.06.10) as Auxiliary Bishop of Toronto (Ontario, Canada) (1955.12.01 – 1968.06.10))
- James Leonard Doyle (24 May 1976 – retired 28 December 2002), died 2004
- Nicola De Angelis (born Italy) (28 December 2002 – retired April 2014) (Note: previously Titular Bishop of Remesiana (1992.04.27 – 2002.12.28) as Auxiliary Bishop of Toronto (Ontario, Canada) (1992.04.27 – 2002.12.28))
- William Terrence McGrattan (April 2014 – 4 January 2017) (Note: previously Titular Bishop of Furnos minor (2009.11.06 – 2014.04.08) as Auxiliary Bishop of Toronto (Ontario, Canada) (2009.11.06 – 2014.04.08); Bishop of Calgary (Alberta, Canada) (4 January 2017 – ...).)
- Daniel J. Miehm (10 March 2017 – 21 April 2026) (Note: previously Titular Bishop of Gor (20 February 2013 - 10 March 2017) as Auxiliary Bishop of Hamilton (Ontario, Canada) (20 February 2013 - 10 March 2017).)
- Wayne Lobsinger (13 November 2026 – present)

=== Other priests of this diocese who became bishops ===
- David Joseph Scollard, appointed Bishop of Sault Sainte Marie, Ontario in 1904
- Michael Mulhall, appointed Bishop of Pembroke, Ontario in 2007

== See also ==
- List of Catholic dioceses in Canada

== Sources and external links ==
- Diocese of Peterborough website
- GCatholic, with Google map and satellite photo - data for all sections
- Diocese of Peterborough page at catholichierarchy.org retrieved August 2, 2006
- the Catholic Encyclopedia
