= Thomas Joseph Dowling =

Canadian prelate of the Catholic Church (1840–1924)

- Bishop of Peterborough
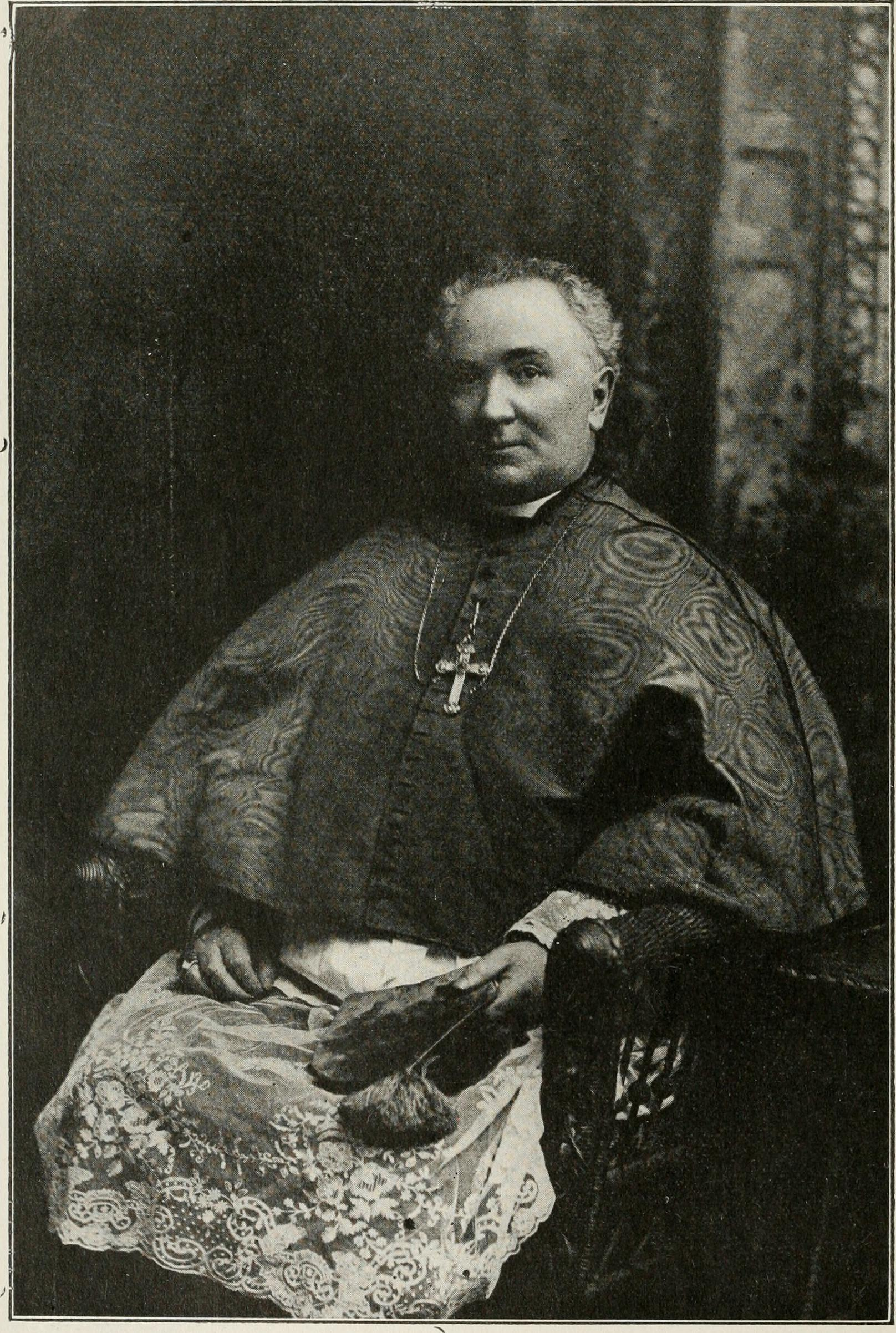
- Diocese: Hamilton
- Installed: 1889
- Term ended: 1924
- Predecessor: James Joseph Carbery
- Successor: John Thomas McNally
- Other post: Bishop of Peterborough, Ontario (1886–1889)

Orders
- Ordination: August 7, 1864
- Consecration: May 1, 1887

Personal details
- Born: February 28, 1840 Shanagolden, County Limerick, Ireland
- Died: August 6, 1924 (aged 84) Hamilton, Ontario, Canada
- Buried: Holy Sepulchre Cemetery
- Education: St Michael's College, Toronto
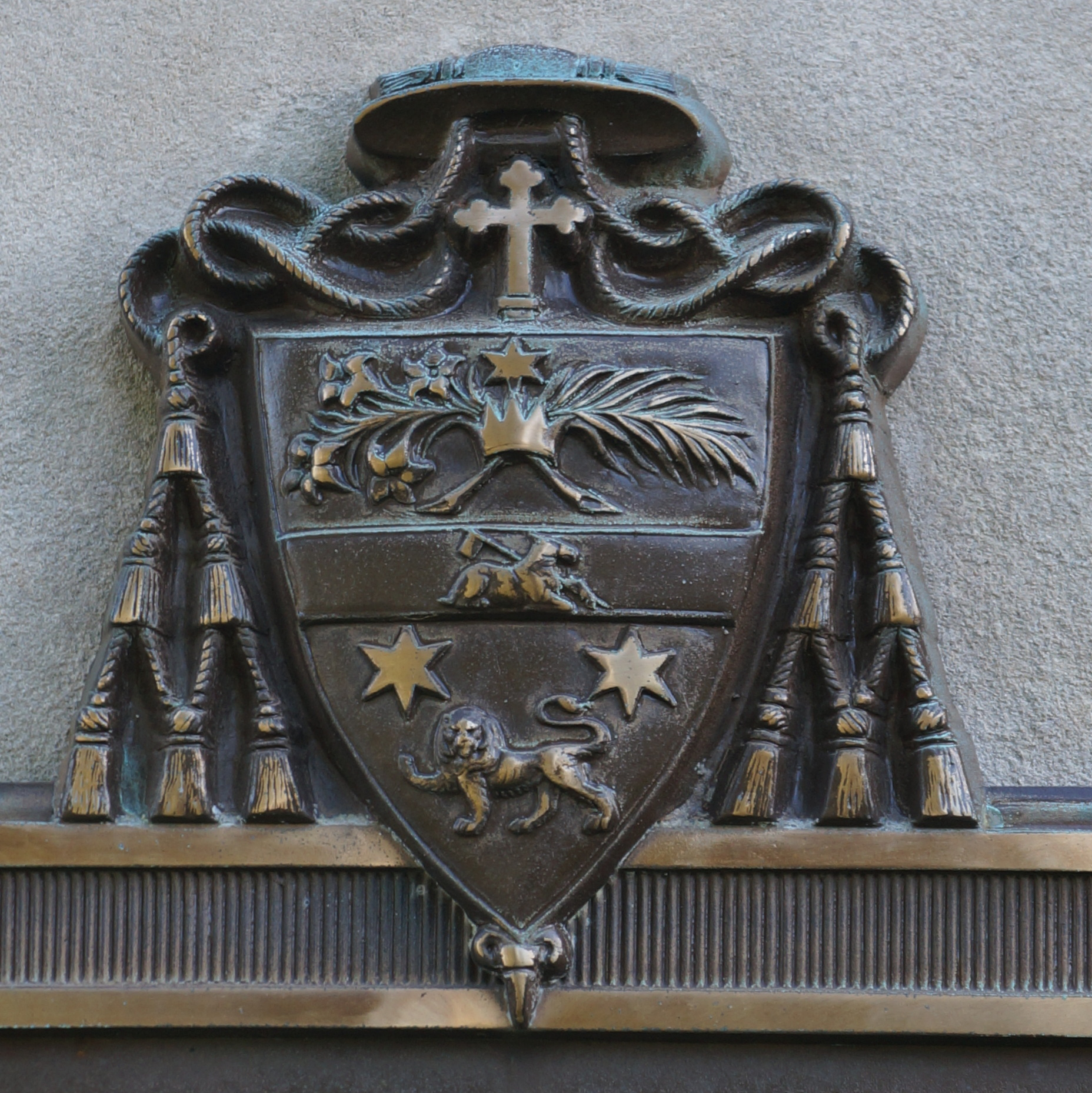
- Coat of arms

Thomas Joseph Dowling (28 February 1840 – 6 August 1924) was a Canadian Catholic priest and the second Bishop of the Catholic Diocese of Peterborough and the fourth Bishop of the Catholic Diocese of Hamilton, Ontario.

== Biography ==
He was born in Ireland, and educated at St. Michael's College, Toronto. He was parish-priest at Paris, Ontario, for 22 years, administrator of the diocese of Hamilton in 1883, he was named bishop of Peterborough in 1887 and on May 1, received his episcopal consecration at St. Mary's Cathedral, Hamilton, from Archbishop John Joseph Lynch, C.M., with Bishops James Joseph Carbery and Thomas Timothy O'Mahony serving as co-consecrators. He was transferred to the bishopric of Hamilton in 1889.
