= Saint Vincent de Paul Chapel =

Chapel located in Paris, France

Coordinates: 48.8488°N 2.3218°E

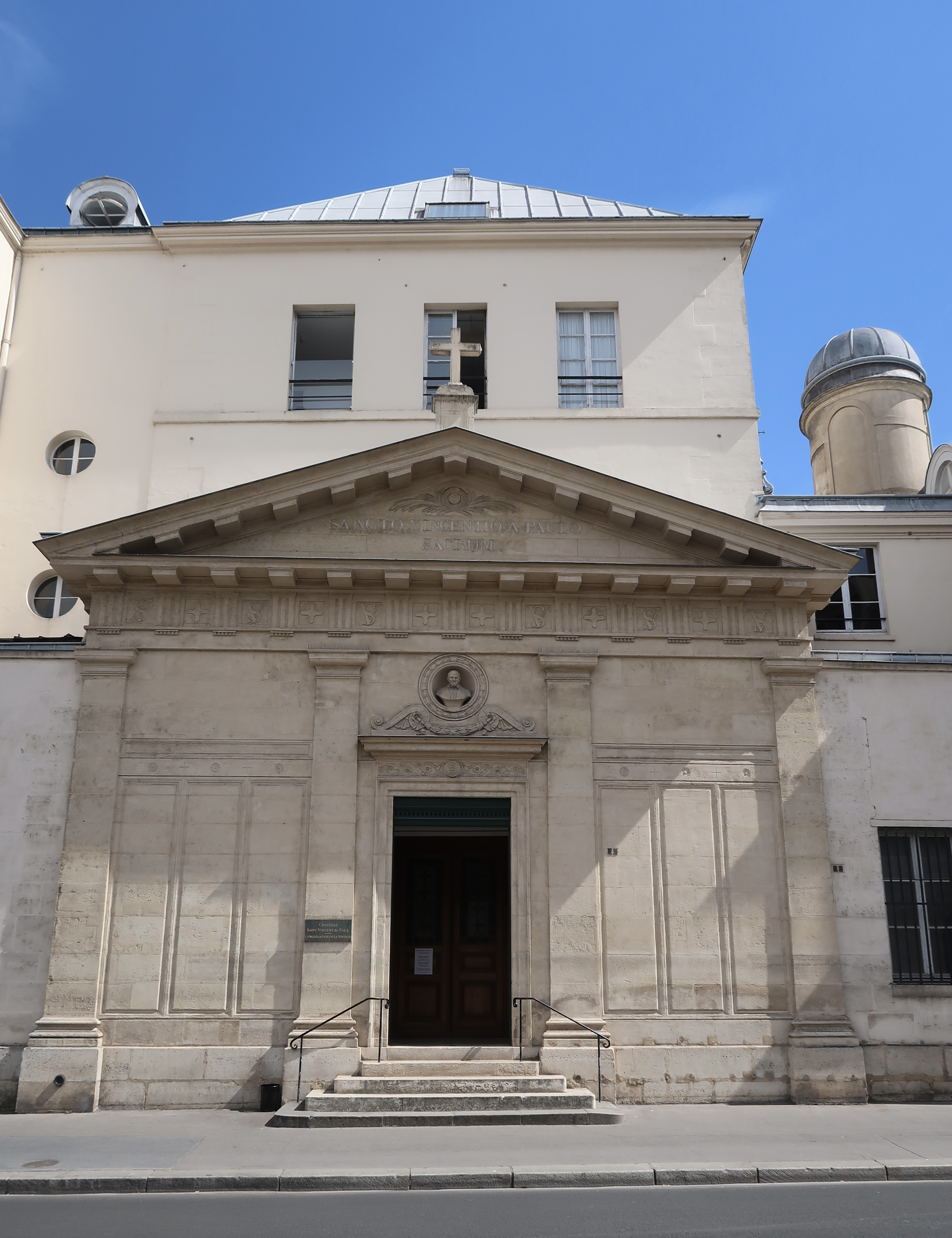
- Saint-Vincent-de-Paul Chapel reliquary

Religion
- Affiliation: Catholic Church
- Province: Archdiocese of Paris
- Rite: Roman Rite

Location
- Location: 95 Rue de Sevres, 6th arrondissement of Paris
- Interactive map of Saint Vincent de Paul Chapel

Architecture
- Style: Neoclassical architecture
- Groundbreaking: 1827

Saint Vincent de Paul Chapel is a Catholic church in Paris, France's 6th arrondissement, 95 rue de Sèvres. It is the church of the Congregation of the Mission, also known as the Lazarists, founded by Saint Vincent de Paul (1581–1660). His remains are venerated there in a silver reliquary over the altar, (made by Charles Odiot) above the main altar.

== History ==
The chapel is a church of the Congregation of the Mission, an order founded by Vincent de Paul in 1625, with a mission to help the poor and to train young men for the priesthood. The original church of the order was located in the Priory of Saint Lazare, but they were expelled during the French Revolution when the priory was transformed into a prison.

To honour their founder, the Lazarists decided to build a new chapel to shelter his relics. The first stone was laid on 17 August 1826. The chapel was consecrated on 1 November 1827 by Archbishop de Quélen. It was restored in 1983 and 1992. It was registered in the Monument historiques on 27 March 1994.

At the time that the church was completed, the relics of Saint Vincent were kept in the Chapel of the Sisters of Charity on rue de Bac. They had been carefully hidden during the French Revolution. The transfer to the new church was made on 25 April 1830. An enormous procession, led by King Charles X of France, escorted the relics to their new home.

The tombs of two other Lazarist martyrs are found in the chapel. Jean-Gabriel Perboyre (1802-1840), was executed by strangulation for preaching without the permission of the Chinese government, and Father Pierre Fracois Cletis, buried alive for the same crime in 1840. Their tombs are found in the 4 side chapels.

== Exterior ==
The facade is Neo-classical and almost bare of decoration. A bust of Saint Vincent de Paul is placed in a niche over the portal.

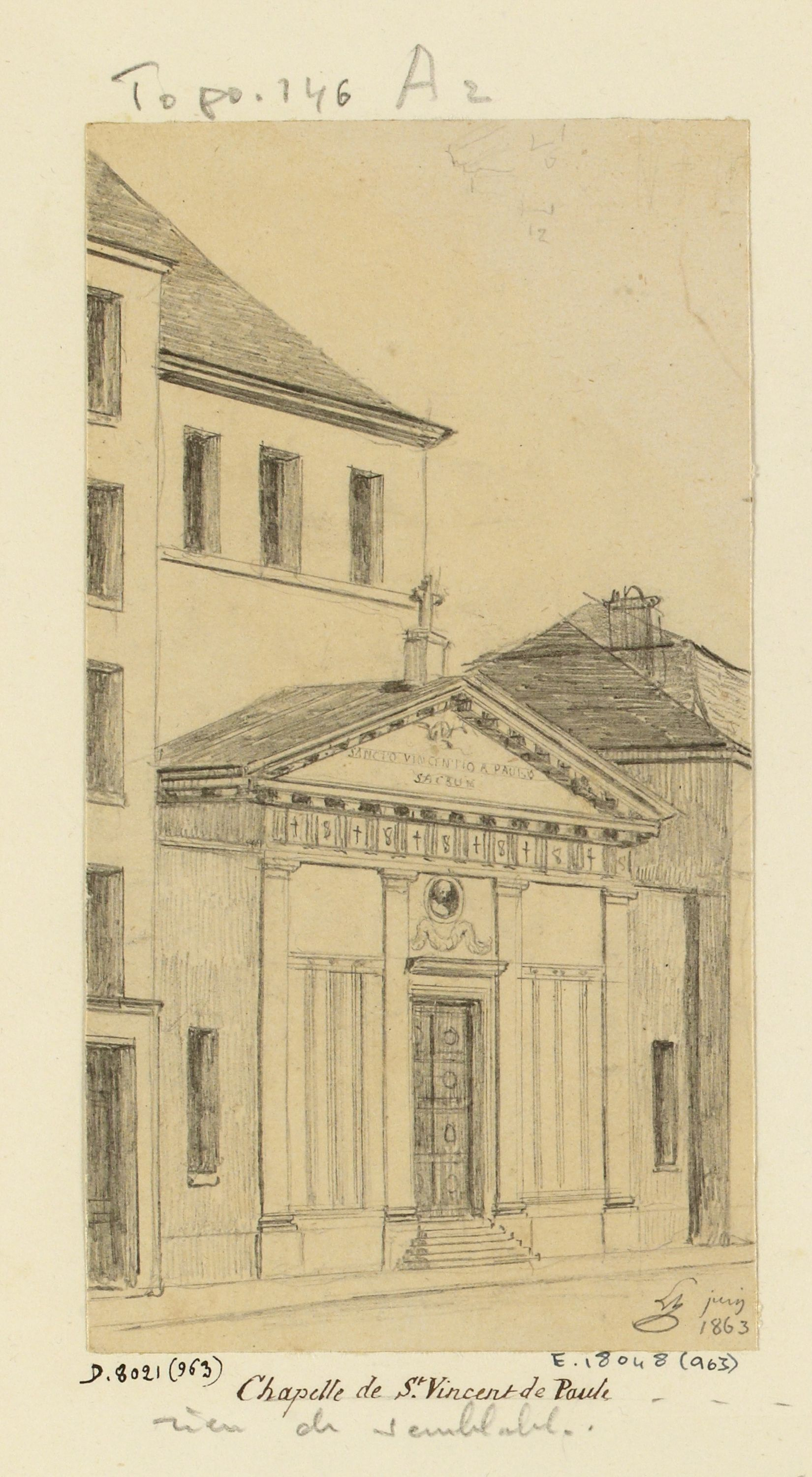
The chapel in. 1863

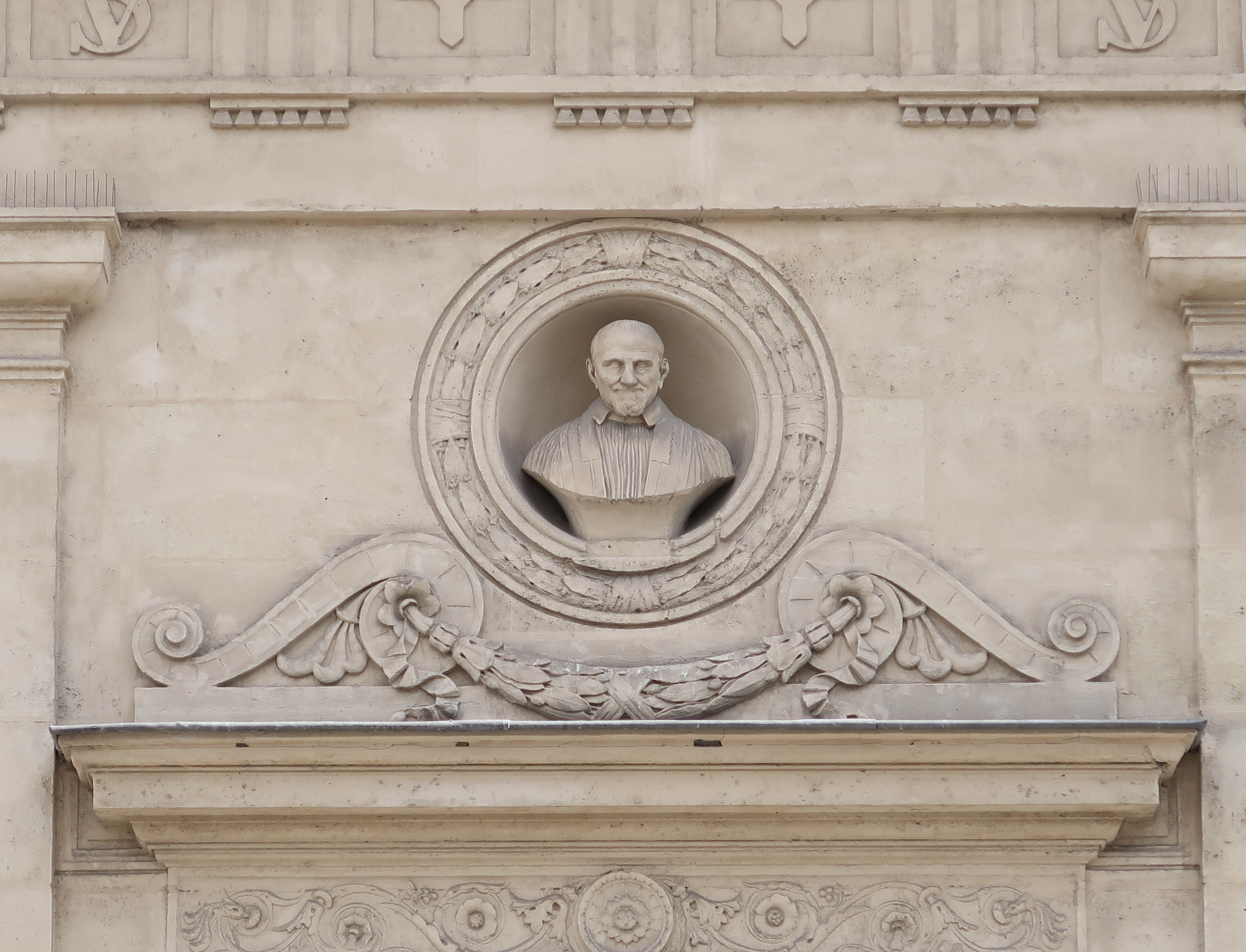
bust of Saint Vincent de Paul over the portal

== The Interior ==
The lavishness of the interior compensates for the austerity of the facade. The relics of the Saint, including his skeleton, are placed in a vessel suspended over the main alter. The vessel is lavishly decorated with sculptures in silver. It can be viewed from the two stairways on either wide of the altar.

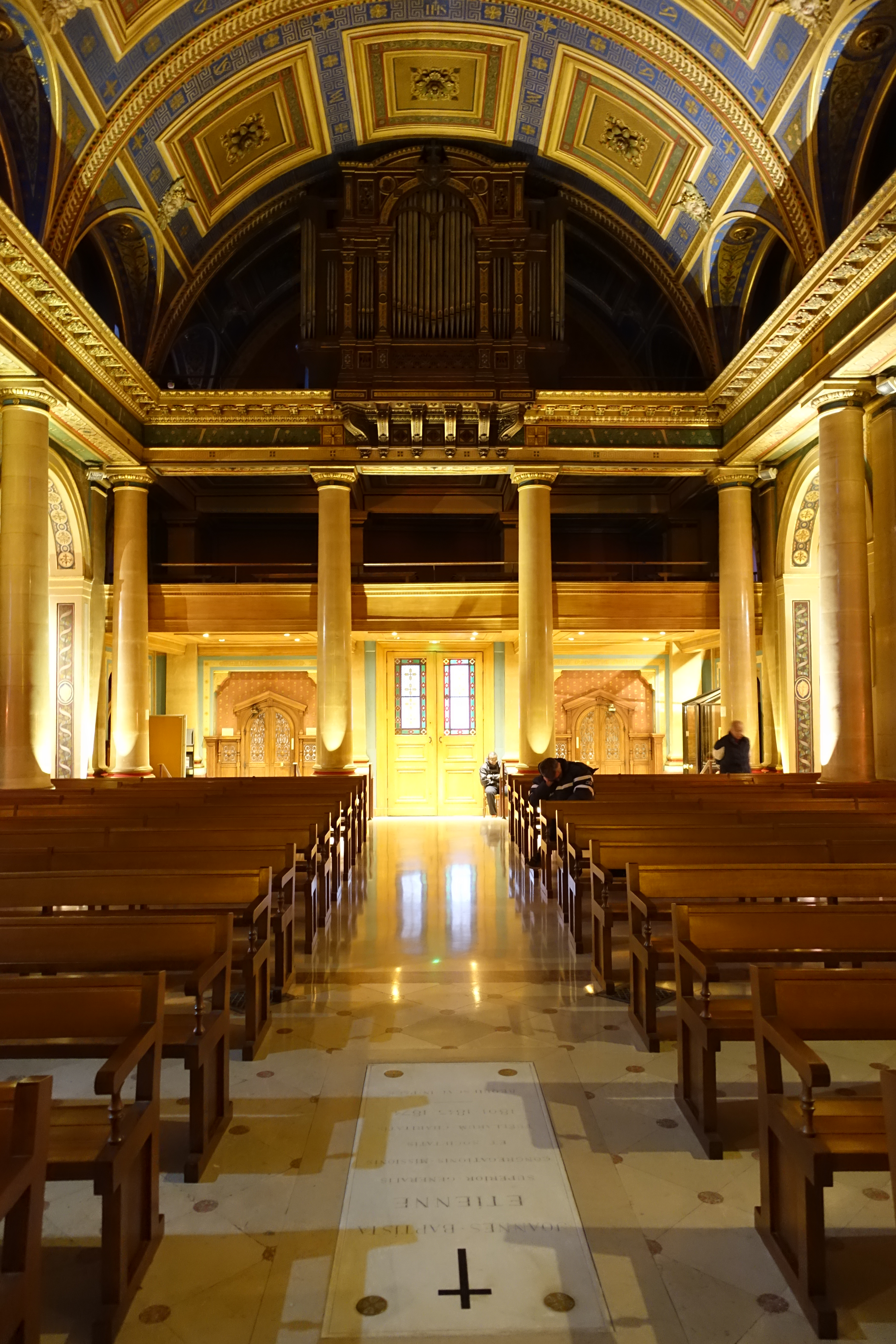
Nave facing the entrance

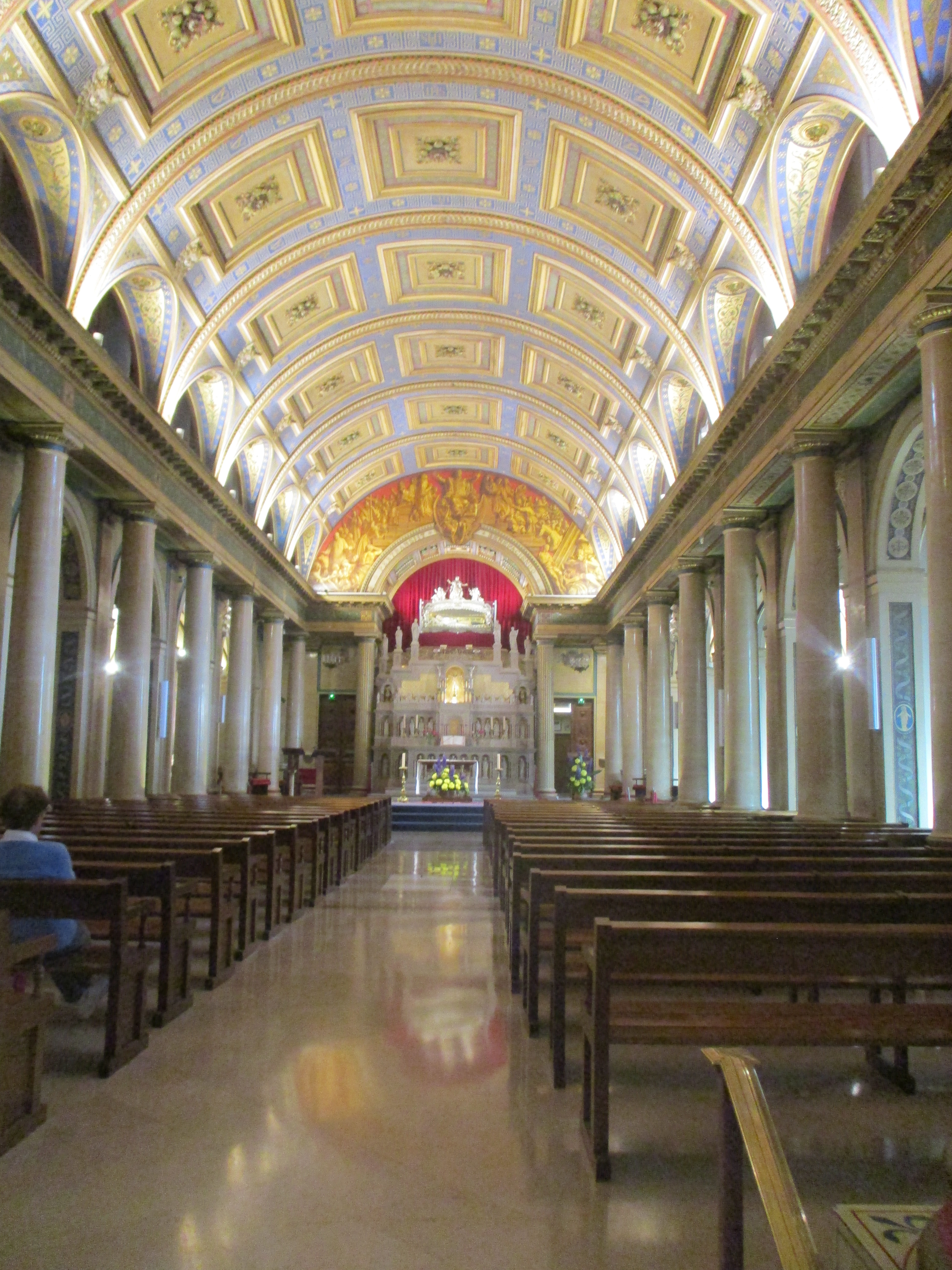
Nave facing the choir

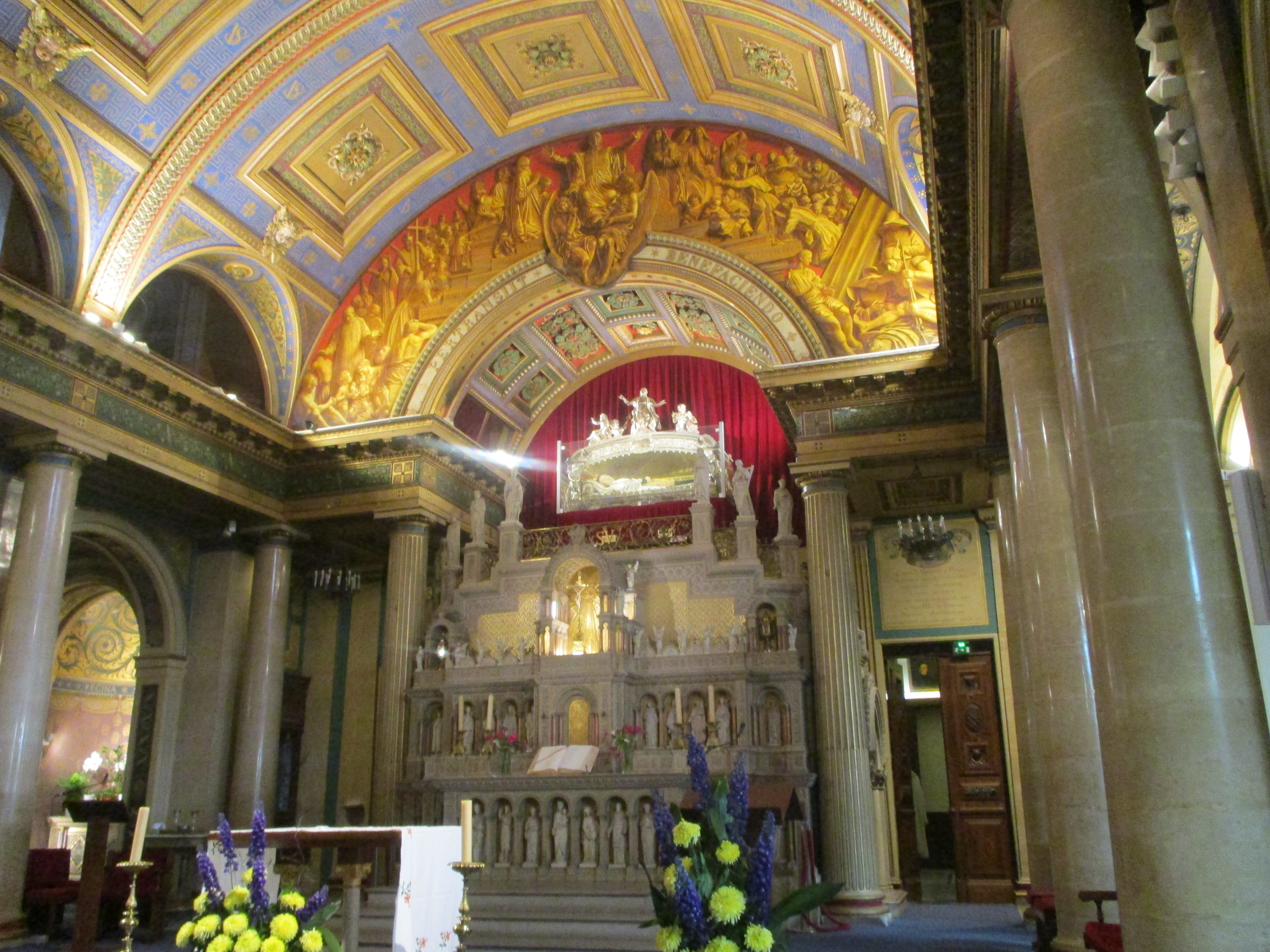
The altar and the choir

== The reliquary of Saint Vincent ==
Saint Vincent died on 27 September 1660. The body of Saint Vincent had been placed in the Chapel of Sisters of Charity after his death. When the remains of Saint Vincent were uncovered in 1712, they were relatively intact; but the eyes and nose were gone. By 1737, however, only the skeleton remained intact.

The vessel for the relics was made by the jeweller Jean-Baptiste-Claude Odiot. It is 2.25 metres long and sixty-five centimetres wide, and had a height in the center of about one meter. It is largely made of silver, and contains his skeleton. At one end is a waxen mask of the face and hand of the Saint. Above his head are the emblems of faith, hope, and charity, the three theological virtues associated with Vincent, carried by four angels. The vessel was funded by a public subscription from the people of Paris.

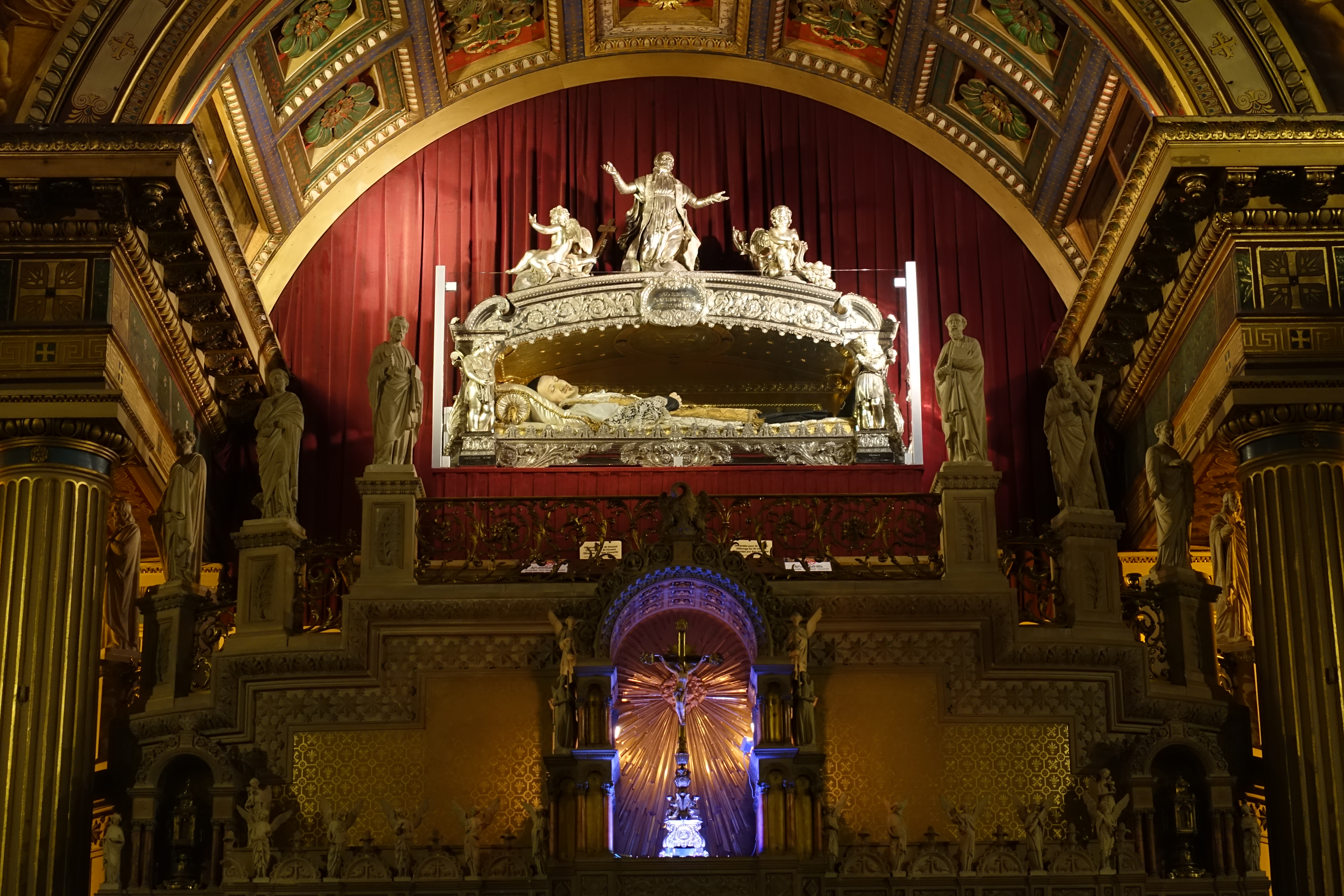
The reliquary

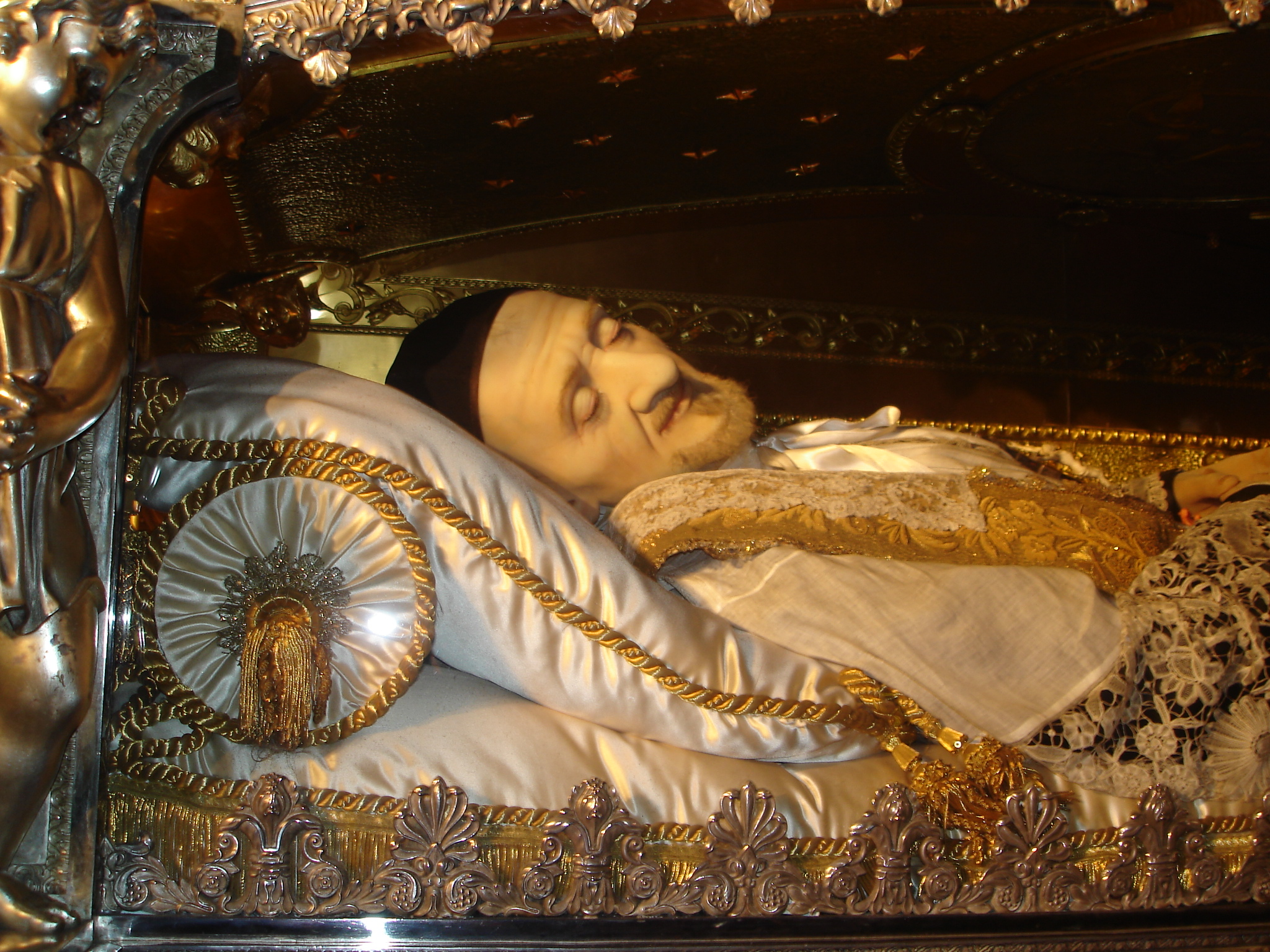
Sculpture of Saint Vincent in the tomb

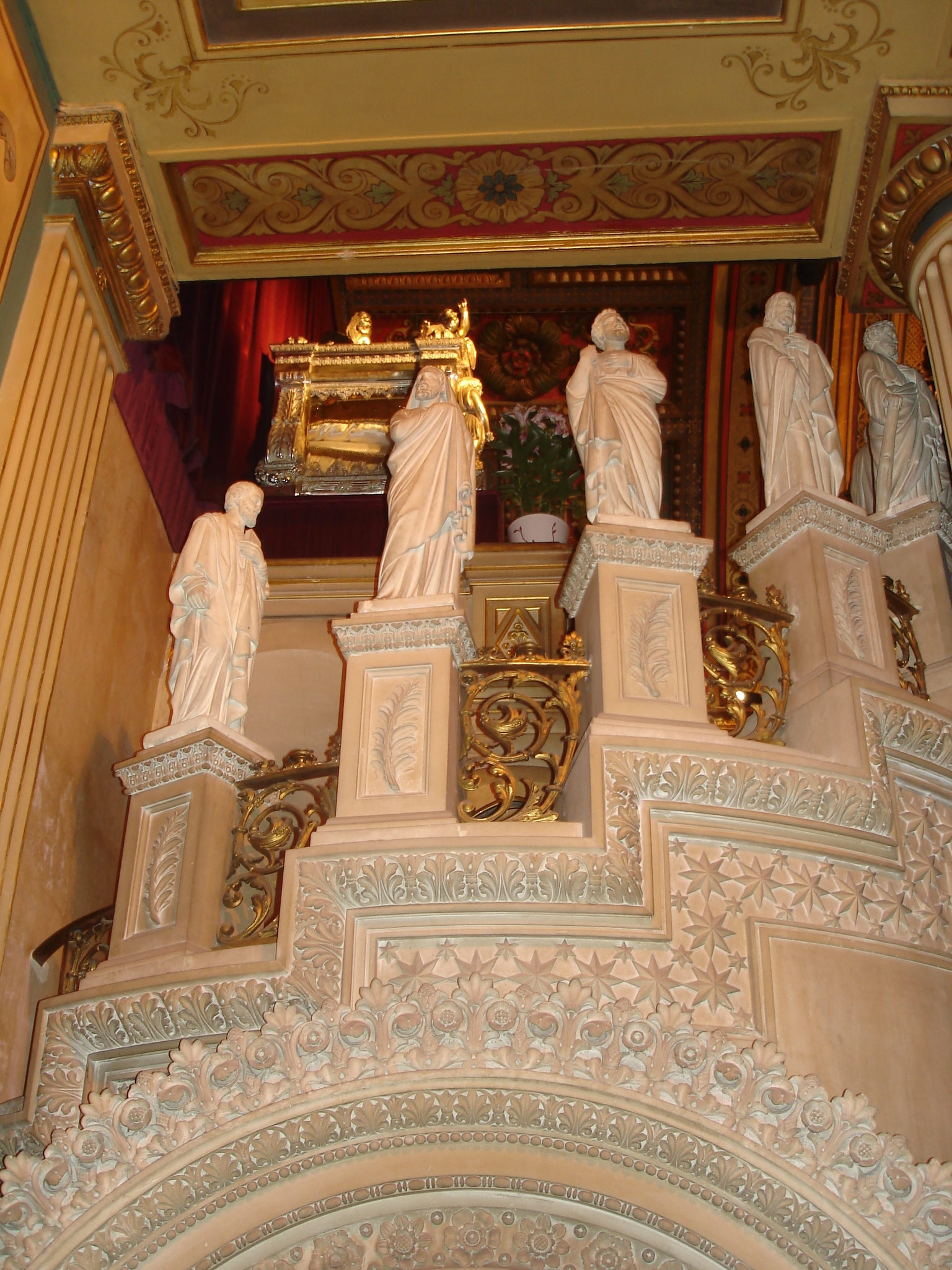
The stairway to the reliquary

== Art and Decoration ==
=== Stained glass ===
The chapel has a very fine collection of stained glass windows which depict scenes from the life of Saint Vincent de Paul.

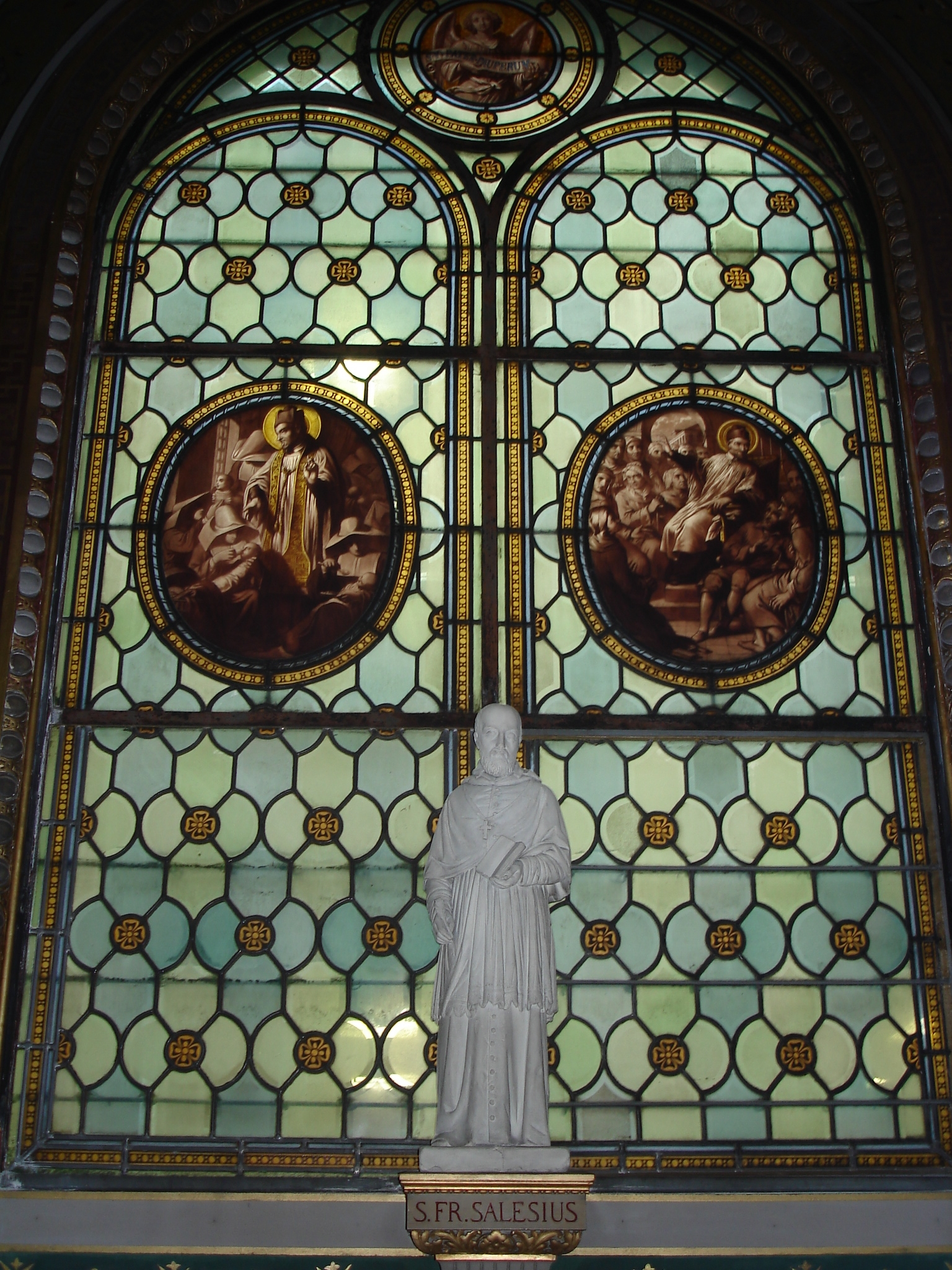

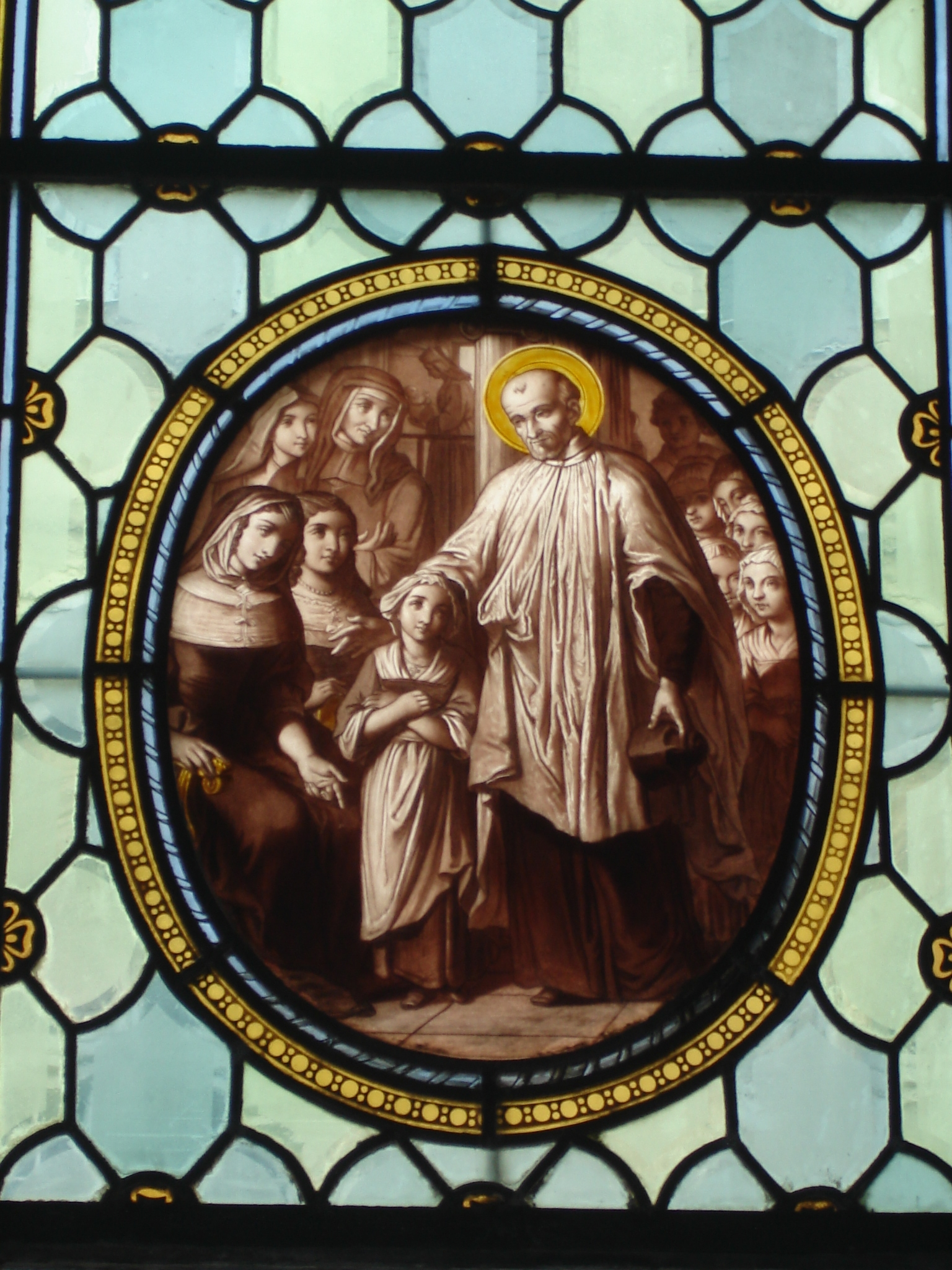

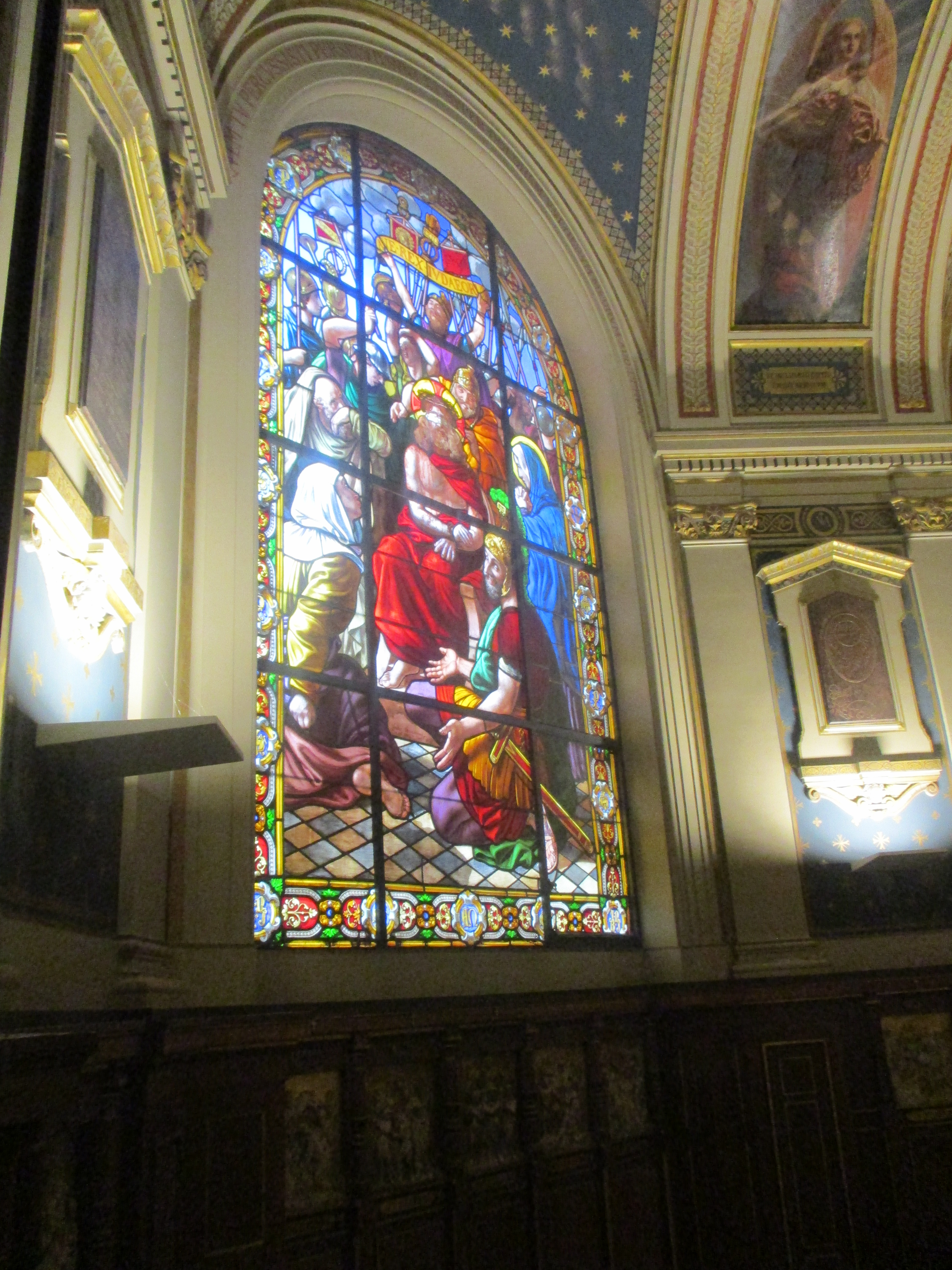
Christ facing his tormenters

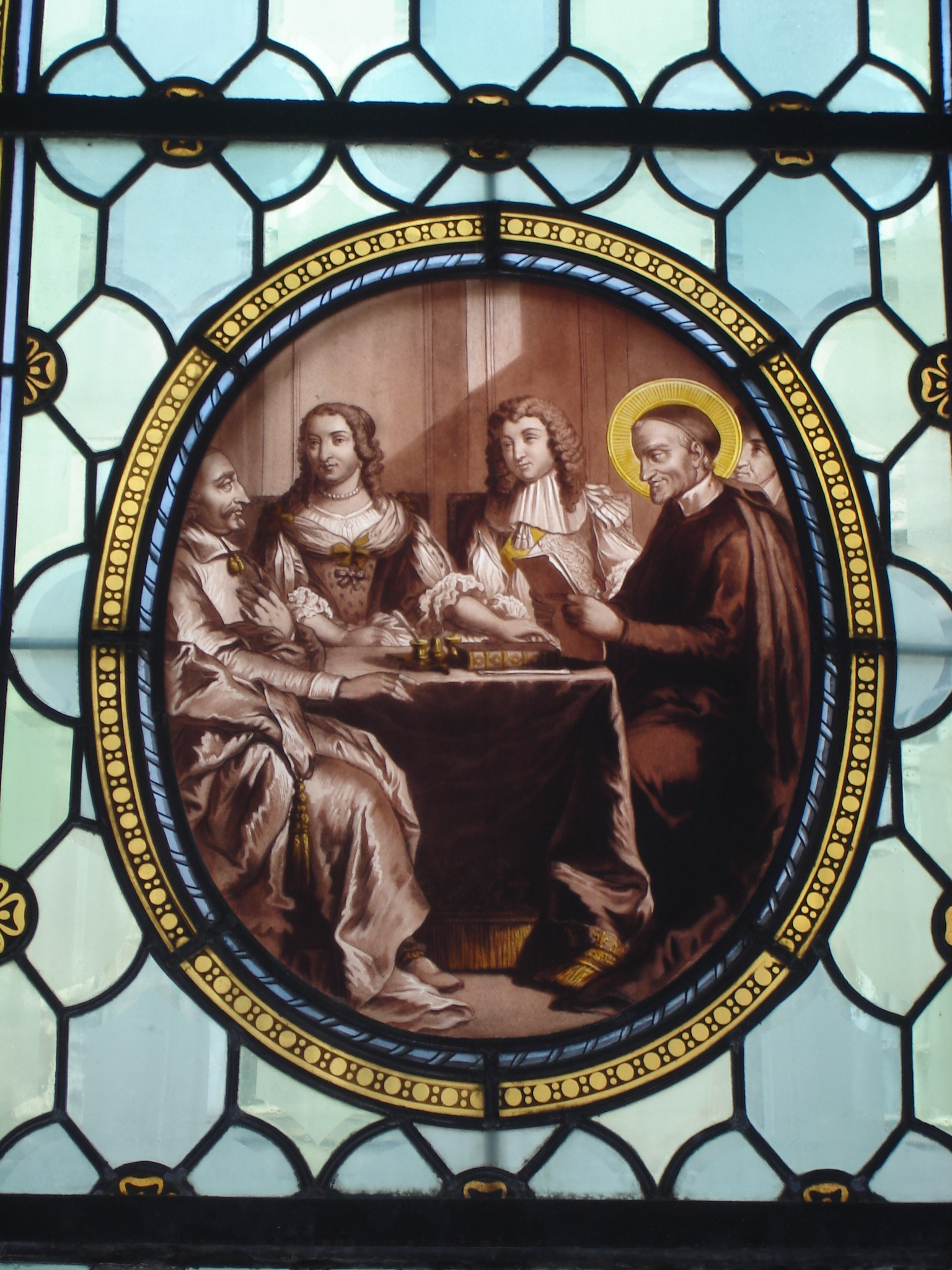
Saint Vincent with Cardinal Richelieu

=== Sculpture and painting ===
Following the doctrine of Saint Vincent de Paul, the designers of the church used every art medium to create images could tell the story of Christ.

In the tribunes, a series of paintings illustrate the life of Christ and the Virgin Mary. Saint Vincent. They were created by Brother Francis, a brother of the Mission, who was a student of the painter Ingres.

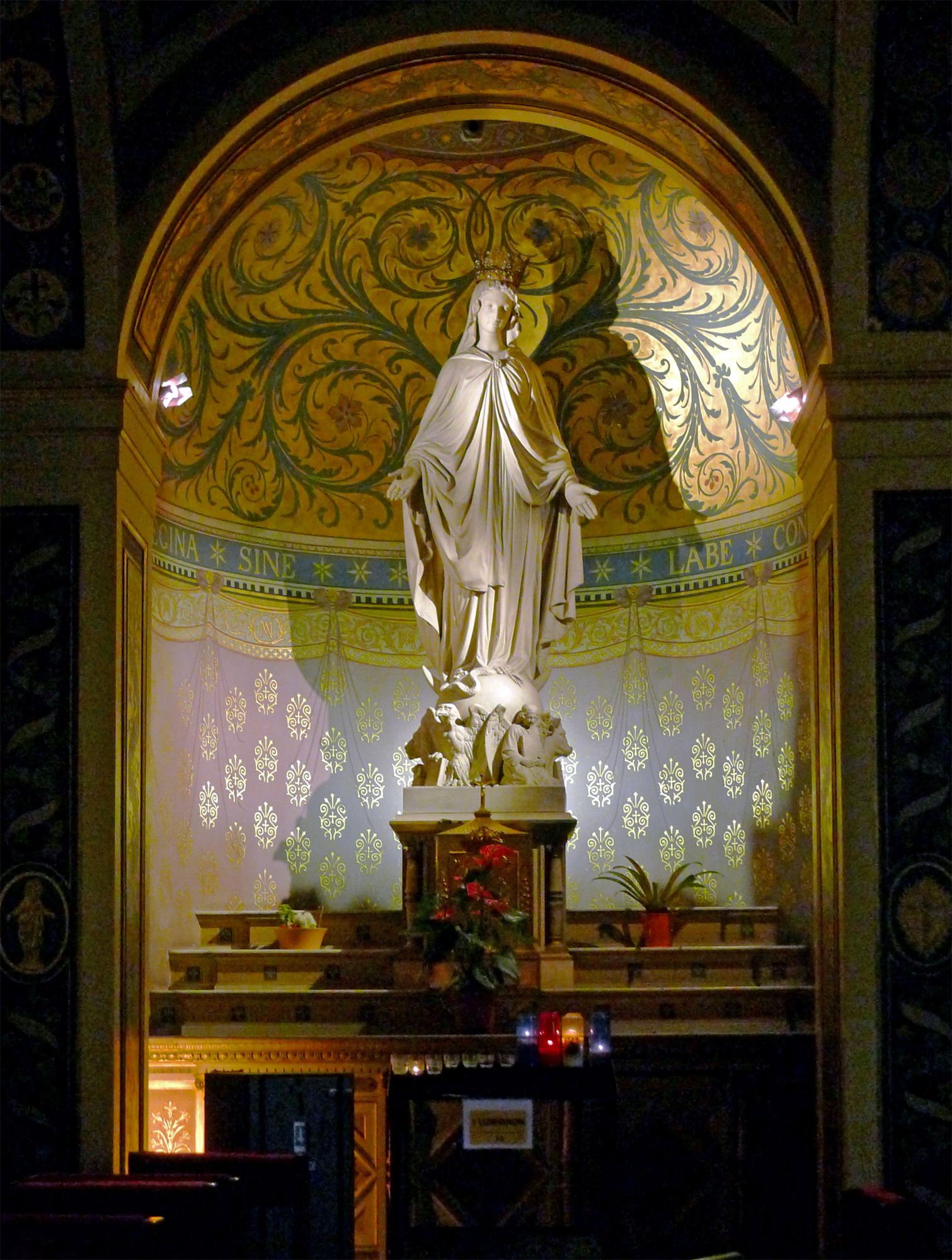
Statue of Mary in the chapel of the Virgin

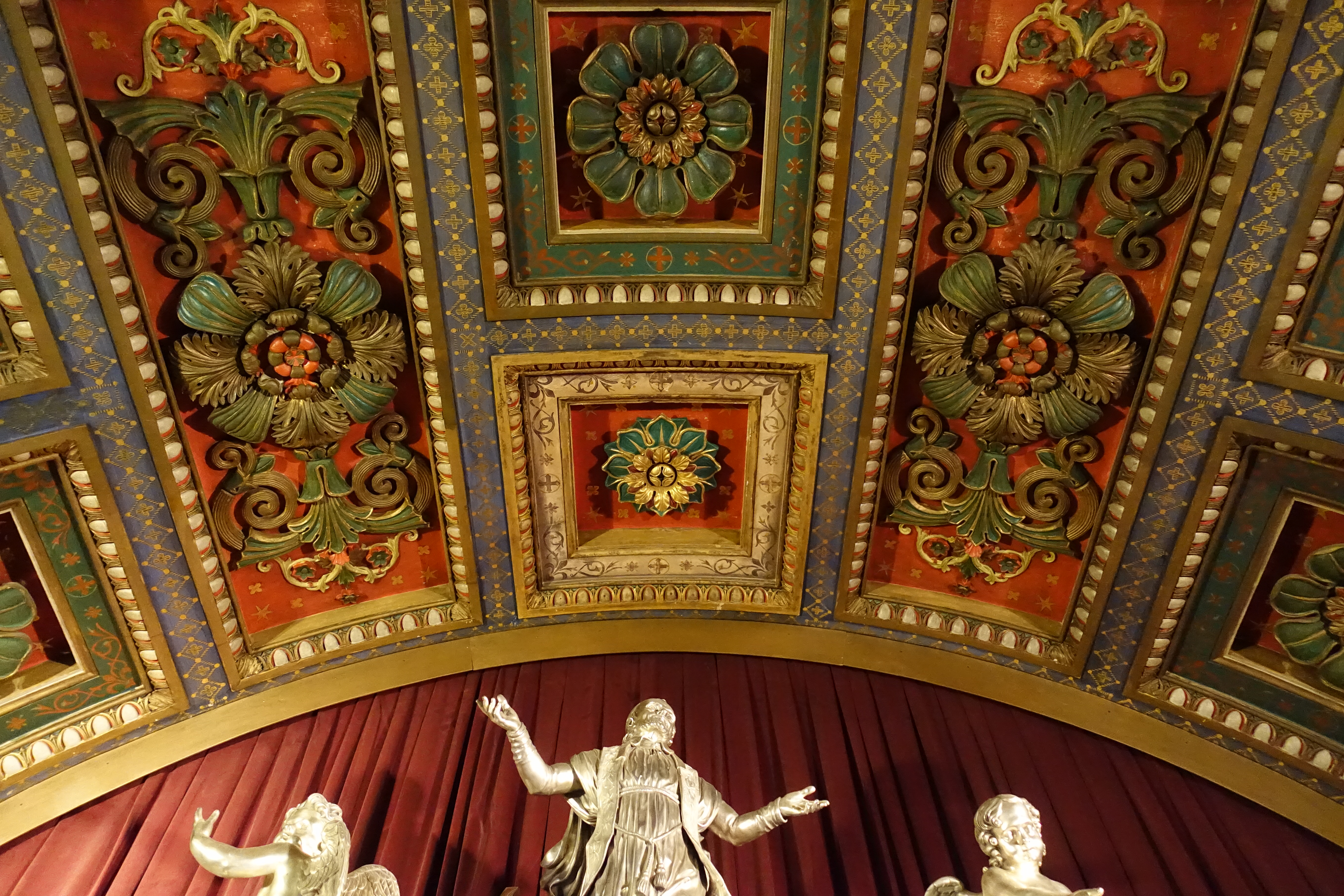
Chapel ceiling decoration

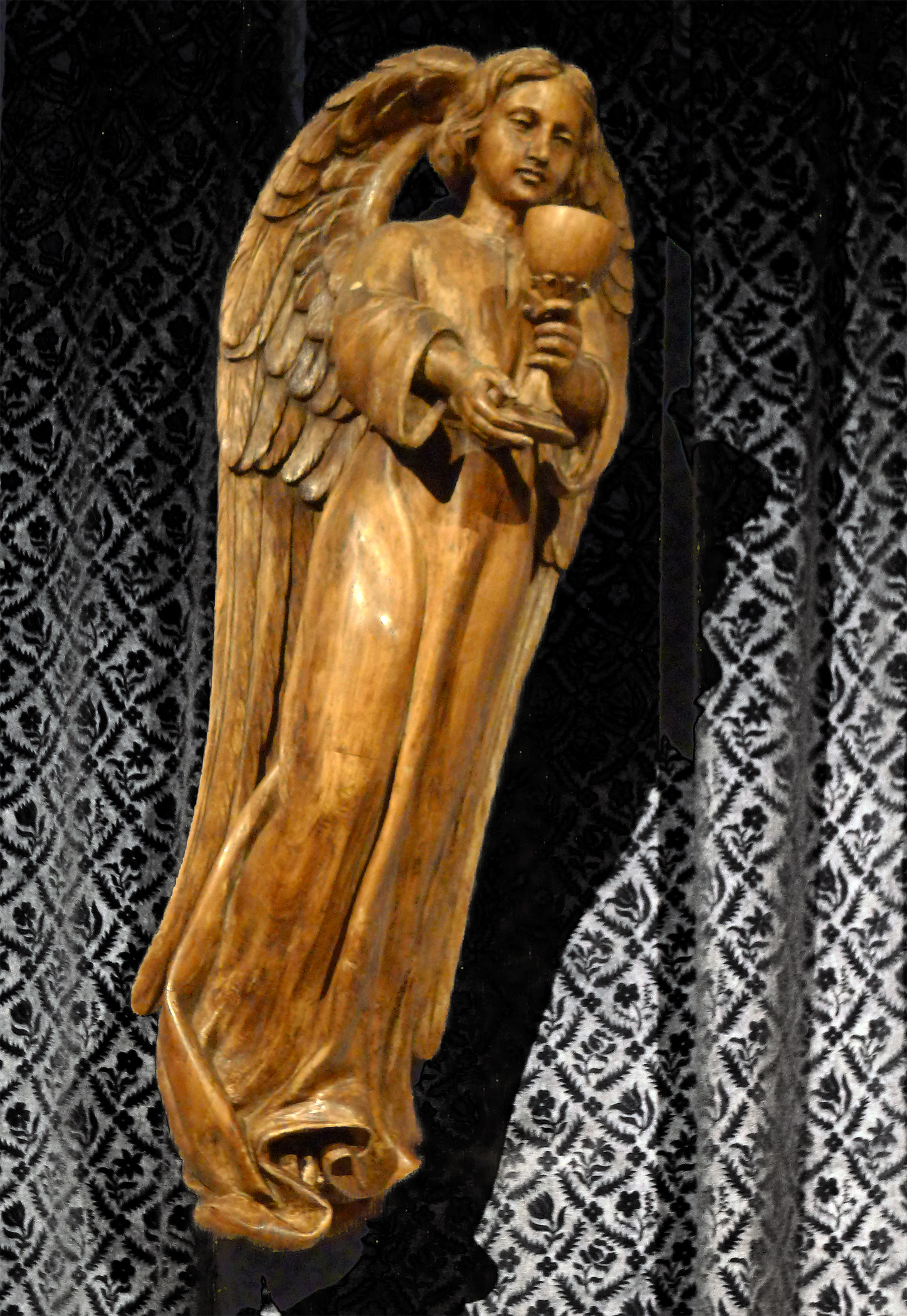
Wooden angel

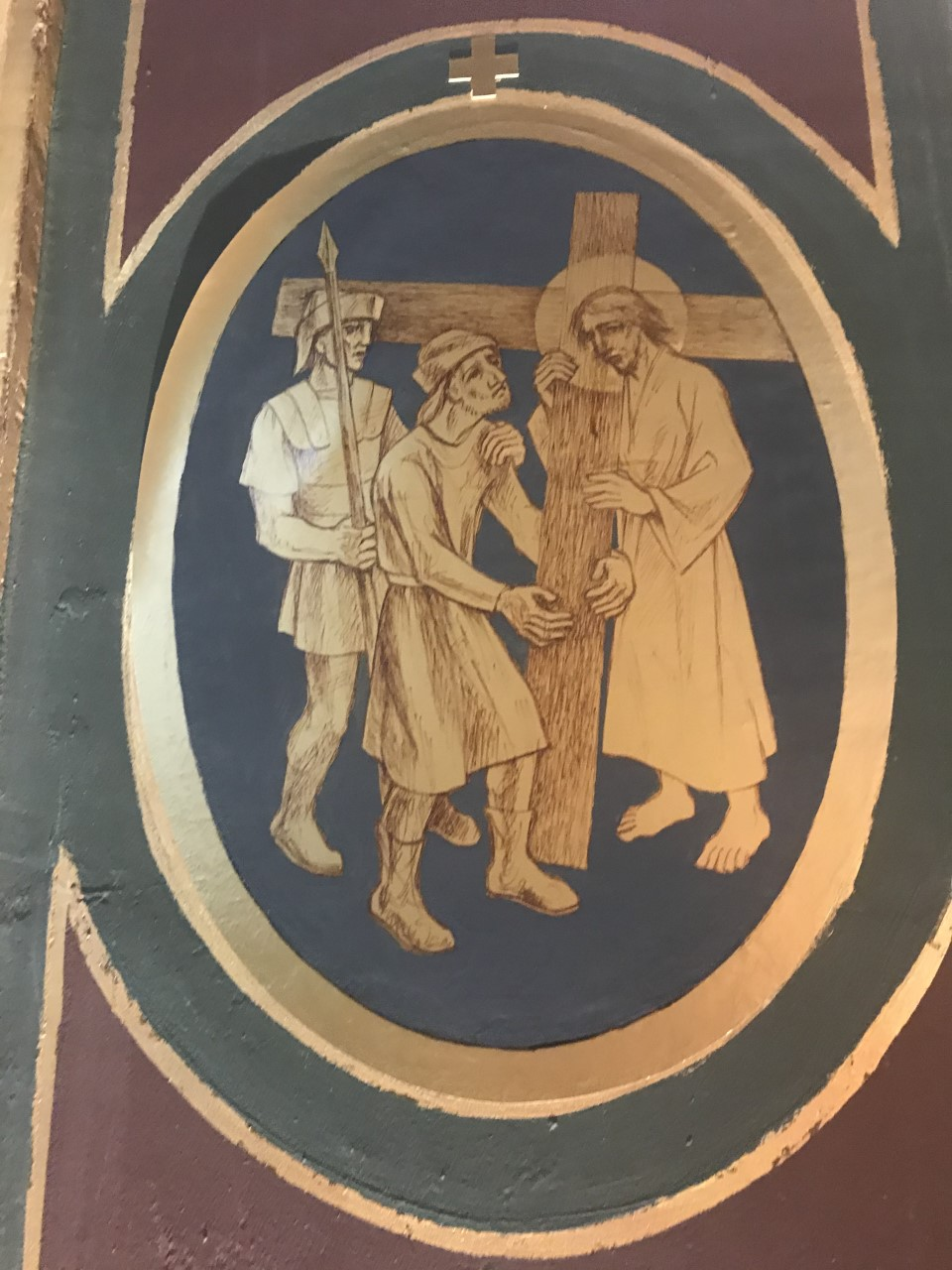
Way of the Cross: Simon de Cedrine

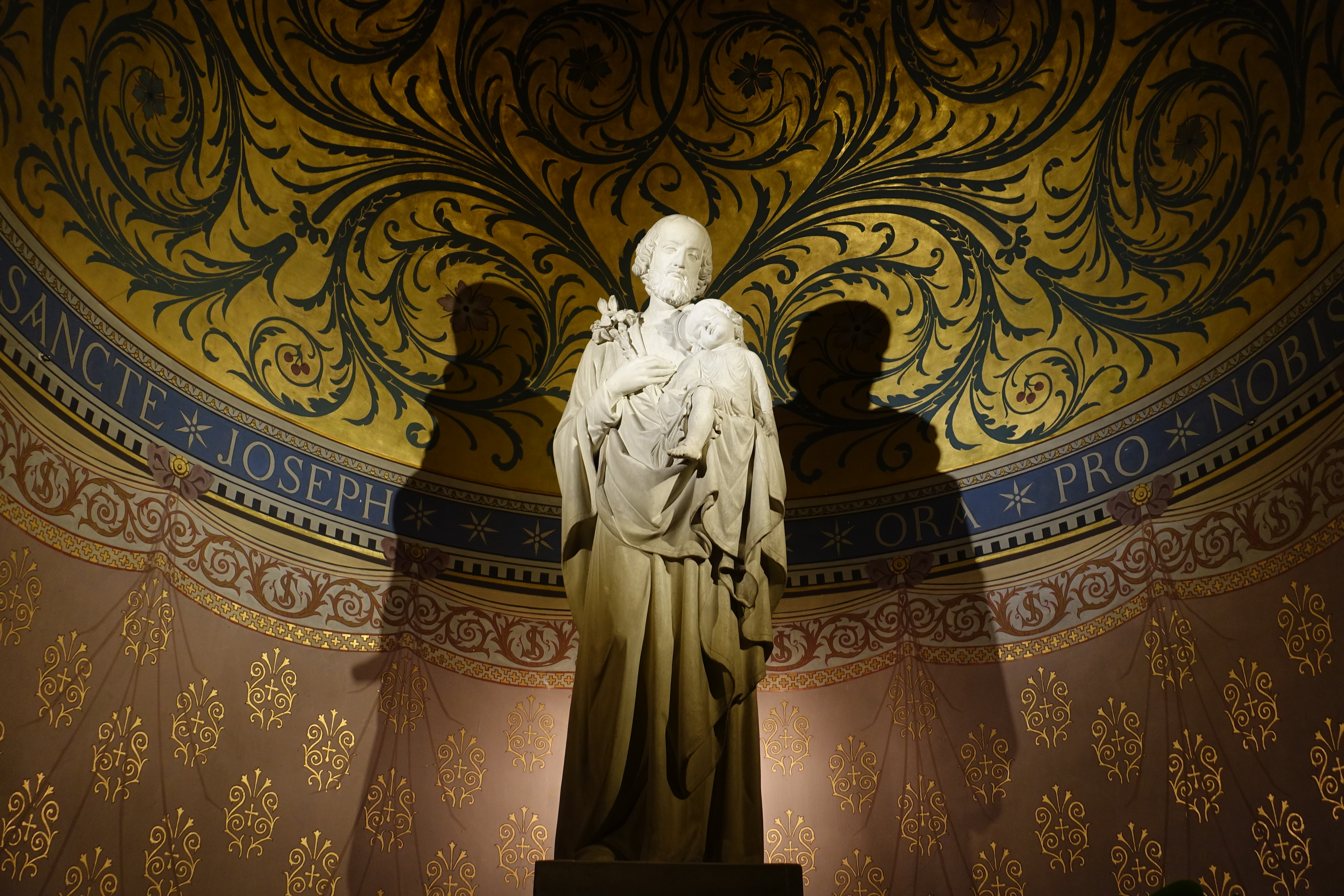
Saint Joseph and the Christ Child

=== The organ ===
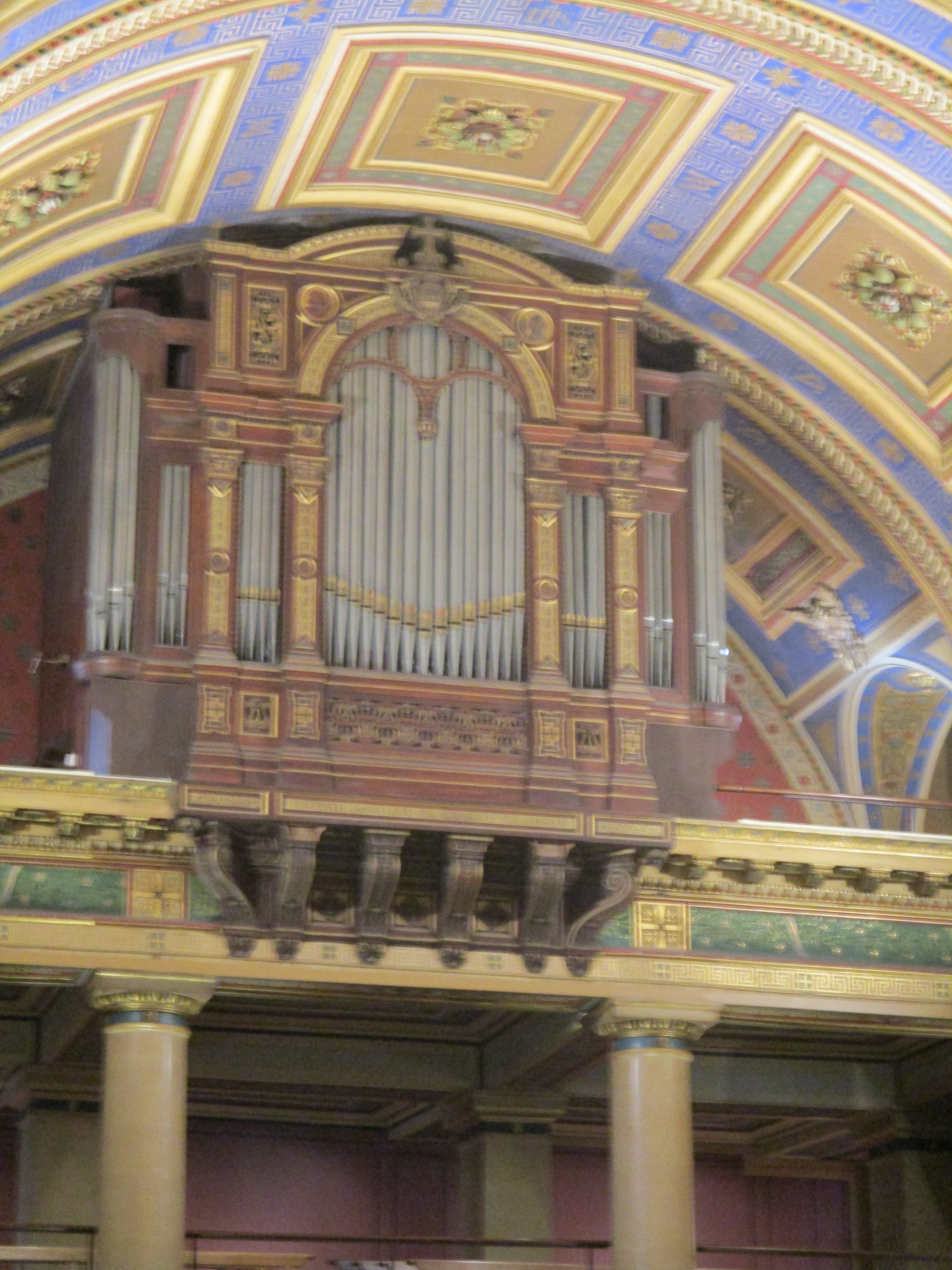
The church organ, in the tribune over the portal

From 1845 until 1852, the organist of the church was Louis Braille, best known for his work with the blind. The organ of the chapel was built in 1864 by the workshop of Aristide Cavaillé-Coll.
