= Vincent de Paul =

French Catholic priest and saint (1581–1660)

Saint Vincent de Paul CM
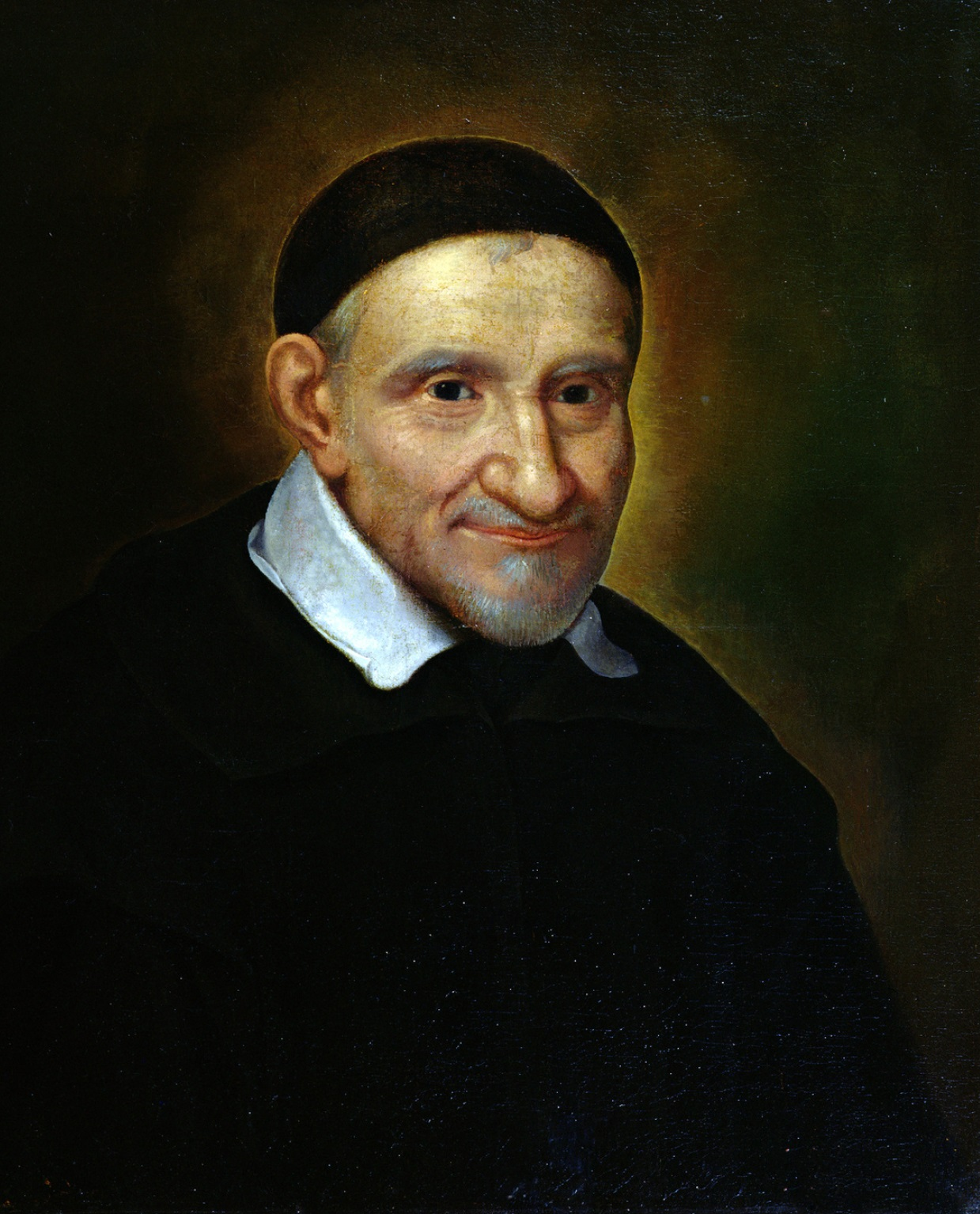
- Seventeenth-century portrait of Vincent by Simon François de Tours

Priest, Confessor, Founder of the Congregation of the Mission
- Born: 24 April 1581; Pouy, Gascony, Kingdom of France
- Died: 27 September 1660 (aged 79); Paris, Kingdom of France
- Venerated in: Catholic Church; Anglican Communion
- Beatified: 13 August 1729, Rome, Papal States by Pope Benedict XIII
- Canonized: 16 June 1737, Rome, Papal States by Pope Clement XII
- Major shrine: Saint Vincent de Paul Chapel, 95, Rue de Sèvres, Paris, France
- Feast: 27 September; 19 July (Roman Calendar, 1737–1969)
- Patronage: Charities; horses; hospitals; leprosy; lost articles; Madagascar; prisoners; Richmond, Virginia; spiritual help; Society of Saint Vincent de Paul; Sacred Heart Cathedral Preparatory; Vincentian Service Corps; volunteers

Vincent de Paul, CM (24 April 1581 – 27 September 1660) was a French Catholic priest who dedicated himself to serving the poor and is best known for founding the Congregation of the Mission and the Daughters of Charity.

After being ordained a priest in 1600, de Paul was kidnapped and enslaved for two years in Tunis and returned to Europe after escaping in 1607. He then served as a parish priest and in the French royal court before dedicating himself to the poor, founding the Ladies of Charity in 1617. In 1622, de Paul was appointed as chaplain to the galley slaves in Paris.

De Paul founded the Congregation of the Mission, also known as the Vincentians or Lazarists, in 1625. Its members, with vows of poverty, chastity, obedience, and stability, were to devote themselves entirely to the people in smaller towns and villages. Vincent was zealous in conducting retreats for clergy at a time when the local clergy's morals were flagging. He was a pioneer in seminary education and also founded the Daughters of Charity in 1633. He is the namesake of the Vincentian Family of organisations, which includes, among other groups, both of the religious communities he founded.

De Paul was renowned for his compassion, humility and generosity, and was canonized in 1737. He is venerated as a saint in both the Catholic Church and the Anglican Communion.

== Early life and education ==
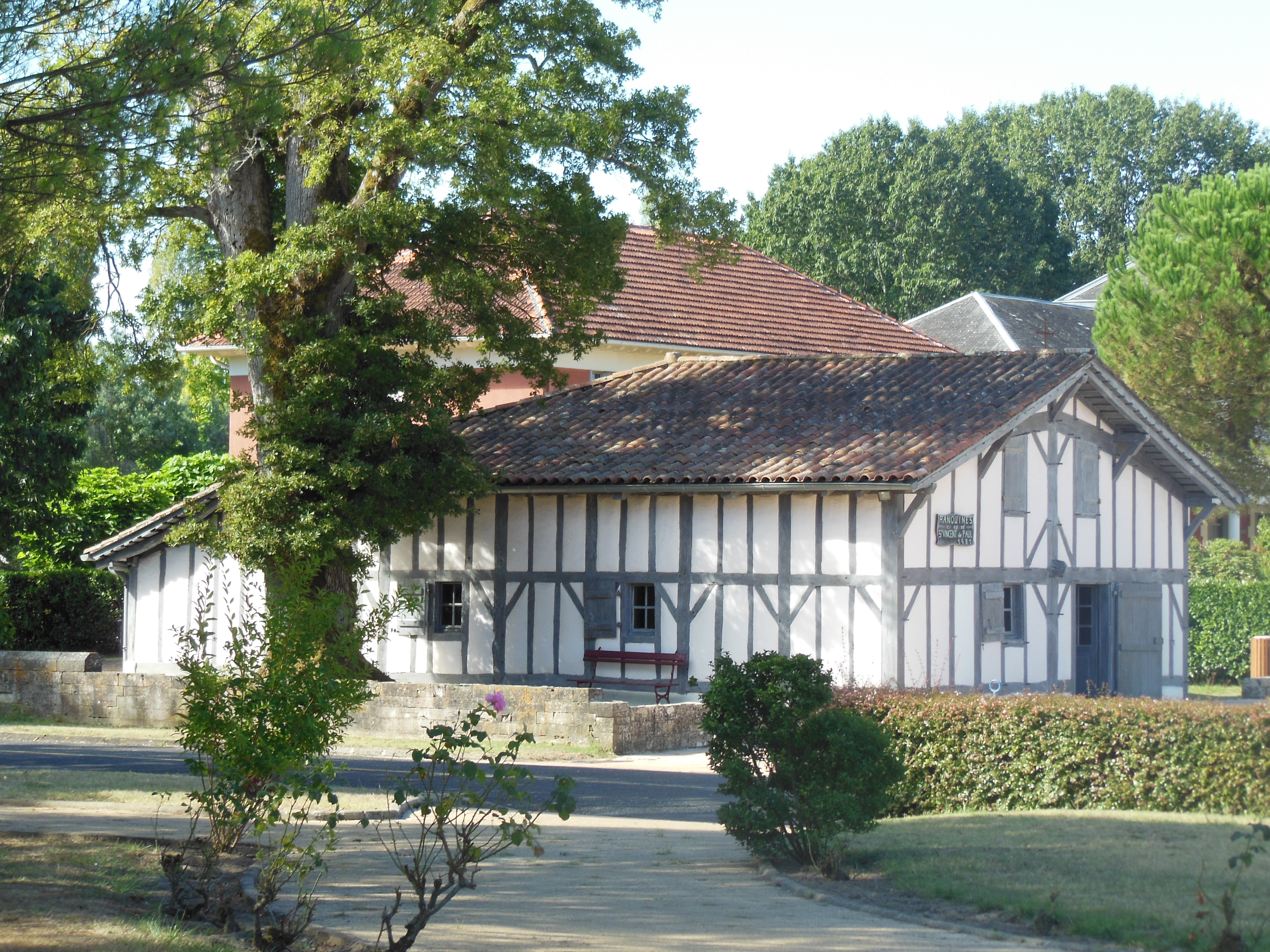
Ranquines, birthplace of Vincent

Vincent de Paul was born on 24 April 1581 in the village of Pouy, in the province of Guyenne and Gascony, Kingdom of France, to peasant farmers. His father was Jean de Paul and his mother was Bertrande de Moras. There was a stream named the "Paul" in the vicinity, and it is believed that this might have been the derivation of the family name. He wrote the name as one word, Depaul (possibly to avoid the inference that he was of noble birth), but none of his correspondents did so. He had three brothers (Jean, Bernard, and Gayon) and two sisters (Marie and Marie-Claudine). He was the third child and demonstrated a talent for literacy early in life. He also worked as a child, herding his family's livestock. At age 15, his father sent him to a seminary, which he paid for by selling the family's oxen.

For three years, Vincent studied at a college in Dax, Aquitaine. It adjoined a monastery of the Friars Minor, where he resided. In 1597, he enrolled in theology at the University of Toulouse. The atmosphere at the university was rough. Fights broke out between various factions of students which escalated into armed battles. An official was murdered by two students. Nevertheless, Vincent continued his studies, financing them by tutoring others.

De Paul was ordained subdeacon and deacon at Tarbes Cathedral in the French Great South-West. and was ordained a priest on 23 September 1600 at the age of 19 in Château-l'Évêque, near Périgueux. This was against the regulations established by the Council of Trent which required a minimum of 24 years of age for ordination, so when he was appointed parish priest in Tilh, an appeal against the appointment was made to the Roman Curia. Rather than respond to a lawsuit in which he would probably not have prevailed, he resigned from the position and continued his studies. On 12 October 1604, he received his Bachelor of Theology from the University of Toulouse. Later he received a Licentiate in Canon Law from the University of Paris.

=== Abduction and slavery ===
Vincent wrote a letter in July 1607 and a postscript in February 1608 that described his experience of abduction and slavery. In 1605, Vincent sailed from Marseille on his way back from Castres where he had gone to sell property he had inherited from a wealthy patron in Toulouse. He was taken captive by Barbary pirates, who took him to Tunis. De Paul was auctioned off as a slave, and spent two years in bondage.

His first master was a fisherman, but Vincent was unsuitable for this line of work due to sea sickness and was soon sold. His next master was a spagyrical physician, alchemist and inventor. Vincent became fascinated by his art and was taught how to prepare and administer his master's remedies. The fame of Vincent's master became so great that it attracted the attention of men who summoned him to Istanbul. During the passage, the old man died and Vincent was sold once again. His new master was a former Catholic priest and Franciscan from Nice, Guillaume Gautier. Gautier had converted to Islam in order to gain his freedom from slavery and was living in the mountains with three wives. The second wife, a Muslim by birth, was drawn to and visited Vincent in the fields to question him about his faith. She became convinced that his faith was true and admonished her husband for renouncing his Christianity. Her husband became remorseful and decided to escape back to France with his slave. They had to wait ten months, but finally they secretly boarded a small boat and crossed the Mediterranean, landing in Aigues-Mortes on 29 June 1607.

==== Debates about abduction narrative ====
Early biographies referred to Vincent's letters in describing his capture and enslavement from 1605 to 1607. More recently, however, some biographers have raised doubts about that narrative but have not suggested any alternative account of Vincent's life during those two years. The biographer Pierre Coste, who wrote Monsieur Vincent, a comprehensive biography based on correspondence, interviews, and documents, publicly confirmed the accuracy of Vincent's captivity and enslavement. According to Antoine Rédier, however, Coste privately questioned the reliability of Vincent's letters about his enslavement but kept those doubts private to avoid scandal and potential backlash. Skeptics agree that the letters themselves were written by Vincent, but question Vincent's account of the events of 1605–1607. Pierre Grandchamps and Paul Debongnie have argued that the captivity narrative is implausible, whereas the analysis of Guy Turbet‑Delof strongly supported Vincent's account and concluded as follows:

"There is nothing in Vincent's writing, or in other sources, that would lead us to reject his testimony. In conclusion, we must accept one of two alternatives; either Vincent de Paul was a prisoner in Tunis from 1605 to 1607, or we must regard his letter of 24th July, 1607, and the postscript dated 28th February, 1608, as a brilliant fraud which he perpetrated without any possible access to literary or other sources for inspiration."

== Return to Europe ==
After returning to France, Vincent went to Rome. There he continued his studies until 1609, when he was sent back to France on a mission to King Henry IV. Once in France, he made the acquaintance of Pierre de Bérulle, whom he took as his spiritual advisor. André Duval, of the Sorbonne introduced him to Canfield's Rule of Perfection. Vincent was by nature a rather irascible person, but he slowly learned to become more sensitive to the needs of others.

In 1612, he was sent as a parish priest to the Church of Saint-Medard in Clichy. In less than a year, Bérulle recalled him to Paris to serve as a chaplain and tutor to the Gondi family. "Although Vincent had initially begun his priesthood with the intention of securing a life of leisure for himself, he underwent a change of heart after hearing the confession of a dying peasant." It was the Countess de Gondi who persuaded her husband to endow and support a group of able and zealous missionaries who would work among poor tenant farmers and country people in general.

On 13 May 1643, with Louis XIII dead, Queen Anne had her husband's will annulled by the Parlement de Paris (a judicial body comprising mostly nobles and high clergymen), making her the sole Regent. Anne appointed Vincent de Paul as her spiritual adviser; he helped her deal with religious policy and the Jansenist issue.

== Foundations of the Vincentian Family ==
Vincent is the patron of all works of charity. A number of organisations specifically inspired by his work and teaching and which claim Vincent as their founder or patron saint are grouped in a loose federation known as the Vincentian Family. The 1996 publication The Vincentian Family Tree presents an overview of related communities from a genealogical perspective.

In the Philippines, the Vincentian Family commemorated its 150th anniversary in 2008. The celebration was led by Provincial Superior Bienvenido M. Disu, Rev. Fr. Gregorio L. Bañaga, then the President of Adamson University, and Archbishop Jesus Dosado of the Archdiocese of Ozamiz.

=== Confraternities, Ladies of Charity, and Daughters of Charity ===
In 1617, Vincent began serving poor families in Paris, bringing them food and comfort. He organised wealthy women of Paris as the Confraternities of Charity to assist with this work, collect funds for missionary projects, found hospitals, and gather relief funds to assist victims of war and ransom 1,200 galley slaves from North Africa. This participation of women would eventually result in, with the help of Louise de Marillac, the founding of the lay-led Ladies of Charity and the Daughters of Charity of Saint Vincent de Paul (French: Filles de la Charité), a society of apostolic life for women.

=== Congregation of the Mission ===
In 1622, Vincent was appointed a chaplain to the galleys. After working for some time in Paris among imprisoned slaves there, he founded what is now known as the Congregation of the Mission, or the "Vincentians" (also known in parts of Europe as the "Lazarists"). These priests, with vows of poverty, chastity, obedience, and stability, were to devote themselves entirely to the people in smaller towns and villages.

Vincent was zealous in conducting retreats for clergy at a time when there was great laxity, abuse, and ignorance among them. He was a pioneer in clerical training and was instrumental in establishing seminaries. He spent 28 years serving as the spiritual director of the Convent of St. Mary of Angels.

== Death and veneration ==
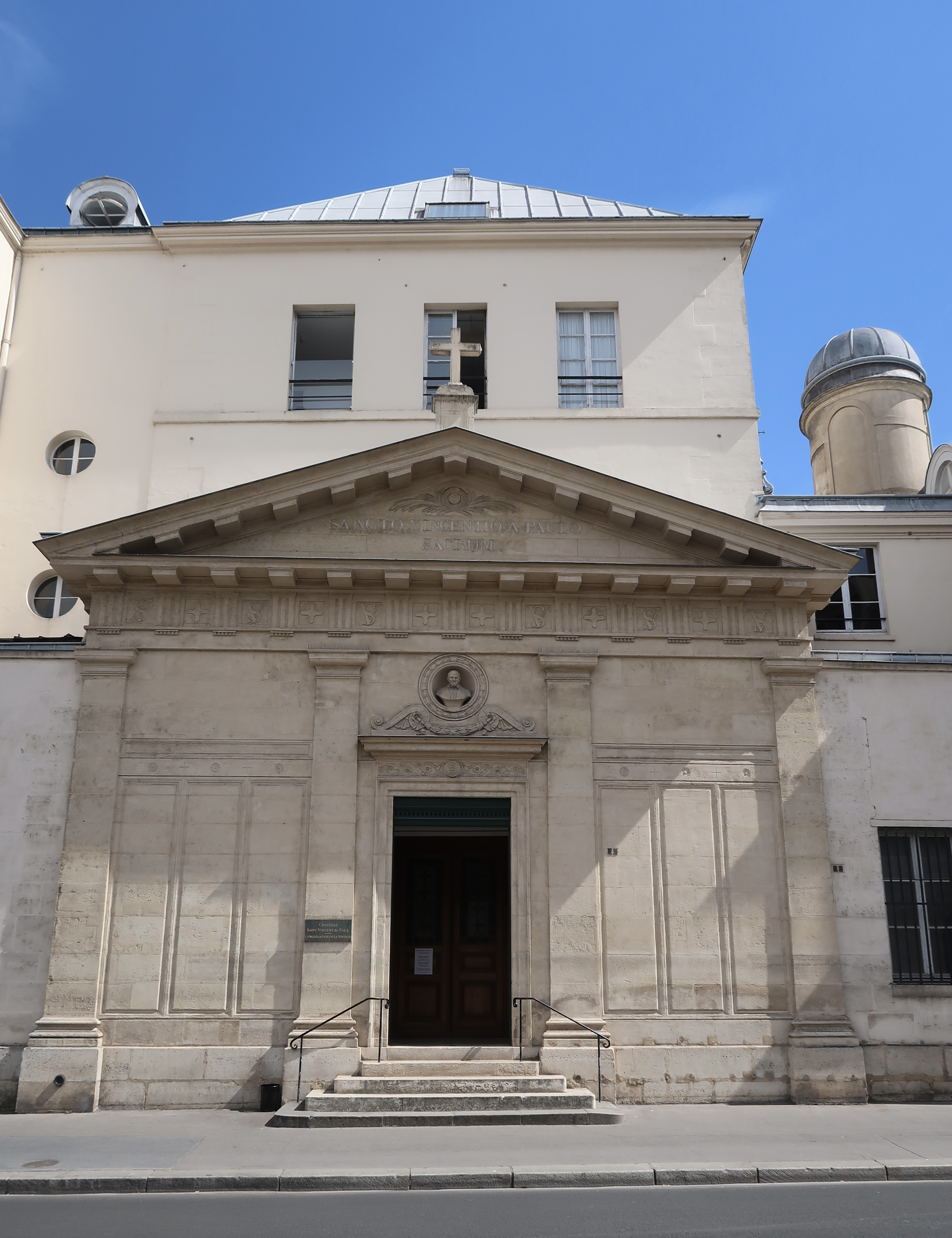
The Saint Vincent de Paul Chapel, The Chapel at 95 rue de Sevres, 6th arrondissement

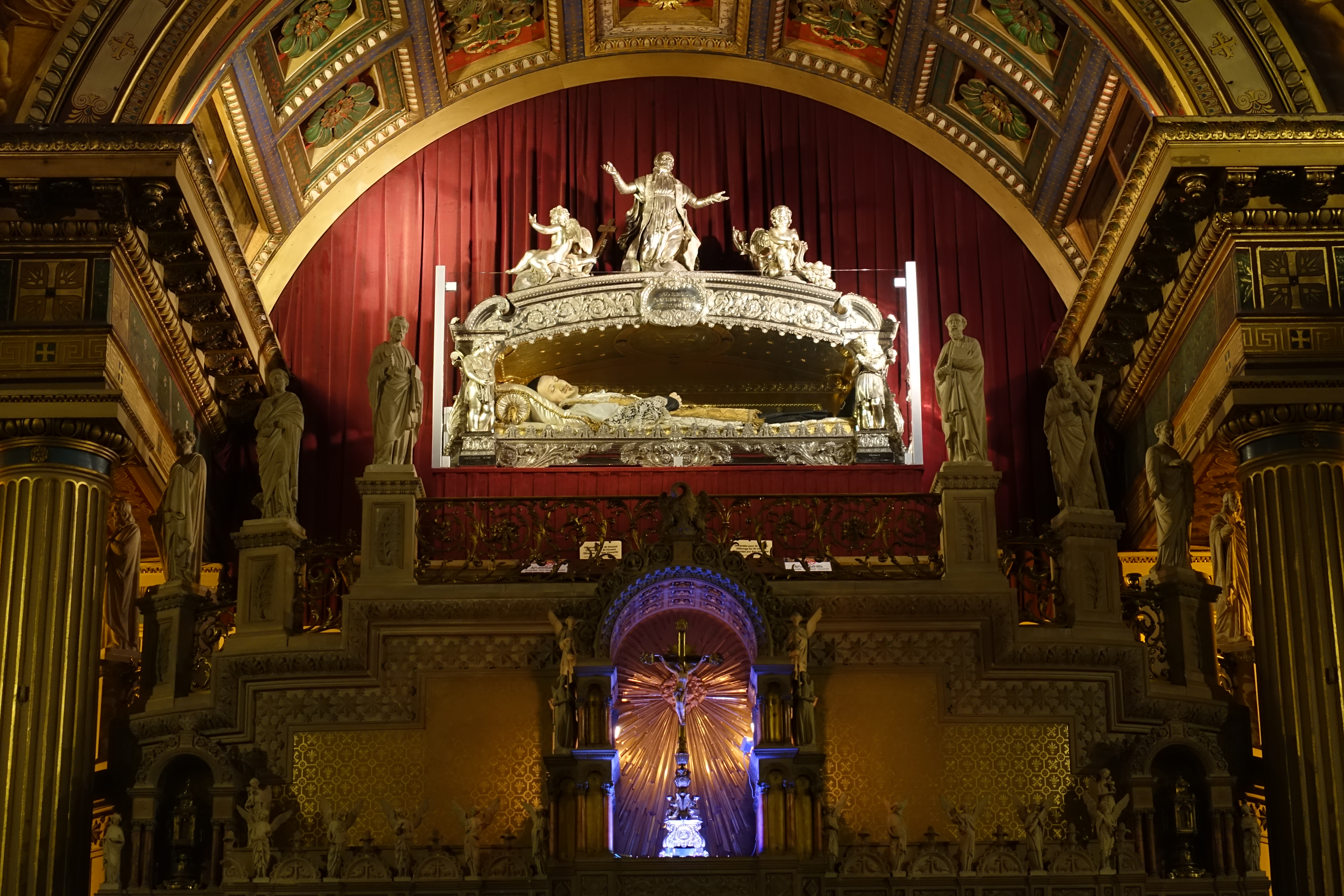
The tomb of the saint

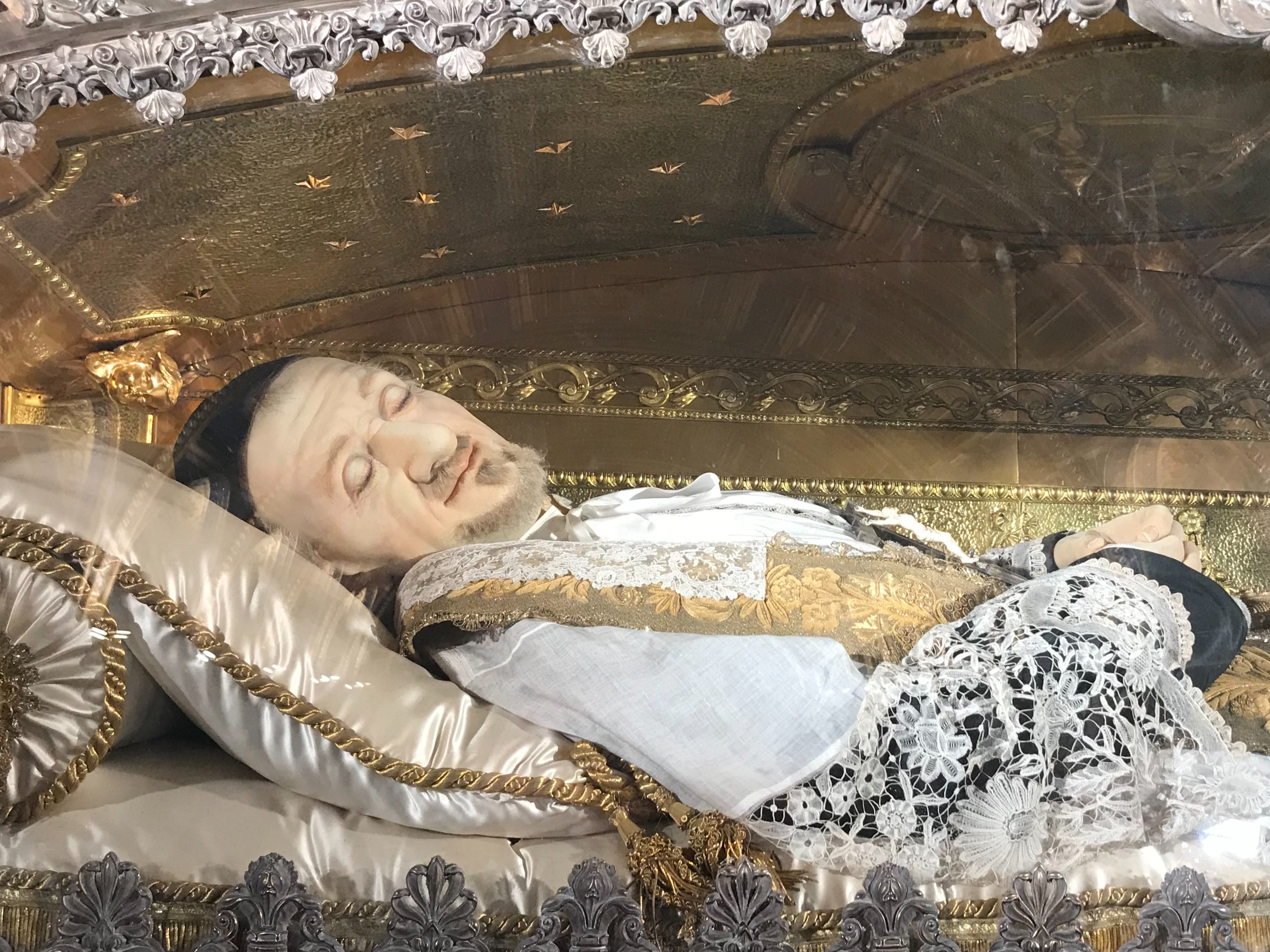
The waxen mask and hands encasing Vincent's bones

Vincent died in Paris on 27 September 1660. Vincent's body was exhumed in 1712, 53 years after his death. The written account of an eyewitness states that "the eyes and nose alone showed some decay." However, when the body was exhumed again during the canonisation in 1737, it was found to have decomposed due to an underground flood. According to the custom of the time, his bones were encased in a waxen figure which is displayed in a glass reliquary in the chapel of the motherhouse of the Vincentian fathers in Paris, the Saint Vincent de Paul Chapel, on the rue de Sèvres. His heart is still incorrupt, and is displayed separately in a reliquary in the chapel of the motherhouse of the Daughters of Charity, also in Paris.

== The Society of Saint Vincent de Paul ==
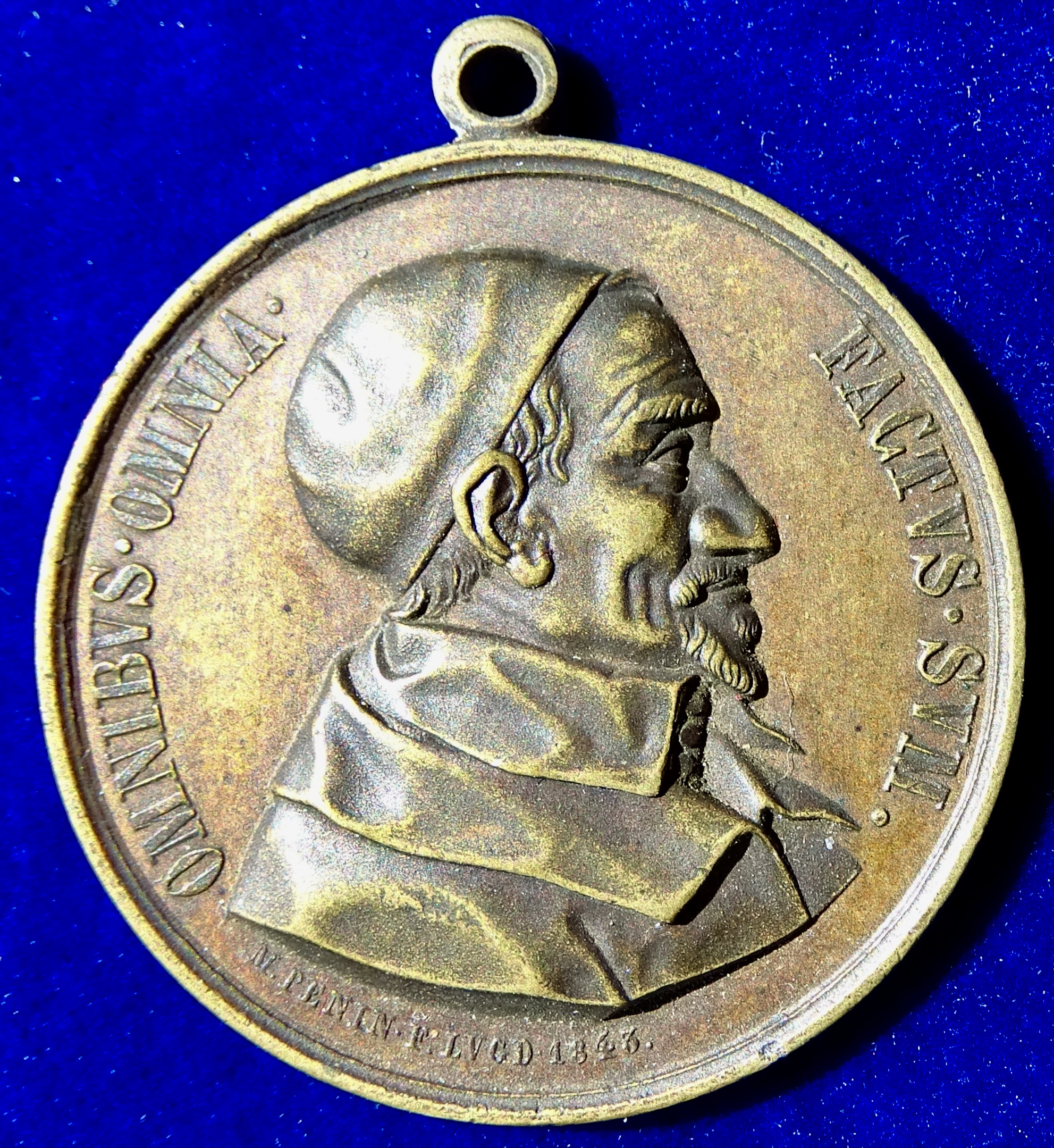
1843 Medal of Vincent by Marius Penin, obverse

The Society of Saint Vincent de Paul, a charitable organisation dedicated to the service of the poor, was established in 1833 by French university students, led by Frédéric Ozanam. The society is today present in 153 countries. In 1705, the Superior General of the Congregation of the Mission requested that the process for Vincent's canonisation be introduced. On 13 August 1729, he was declared Blessed by Pope Benedict XIII. He was canonised some eight years later by Pope Clement XII on 16 June 1737.

As the custom then was, as a consequence of the canonisation, in the same year, Saint Vincent's feast day was included in the Roman Calendar for celebration on 19 July, this date being chosen because his day of death was already used for the feast of Saints Cosmas and Damian. The new celebration was given the rank of "Double", and was changed to the rank of "Third-Class Feast" in 1960.

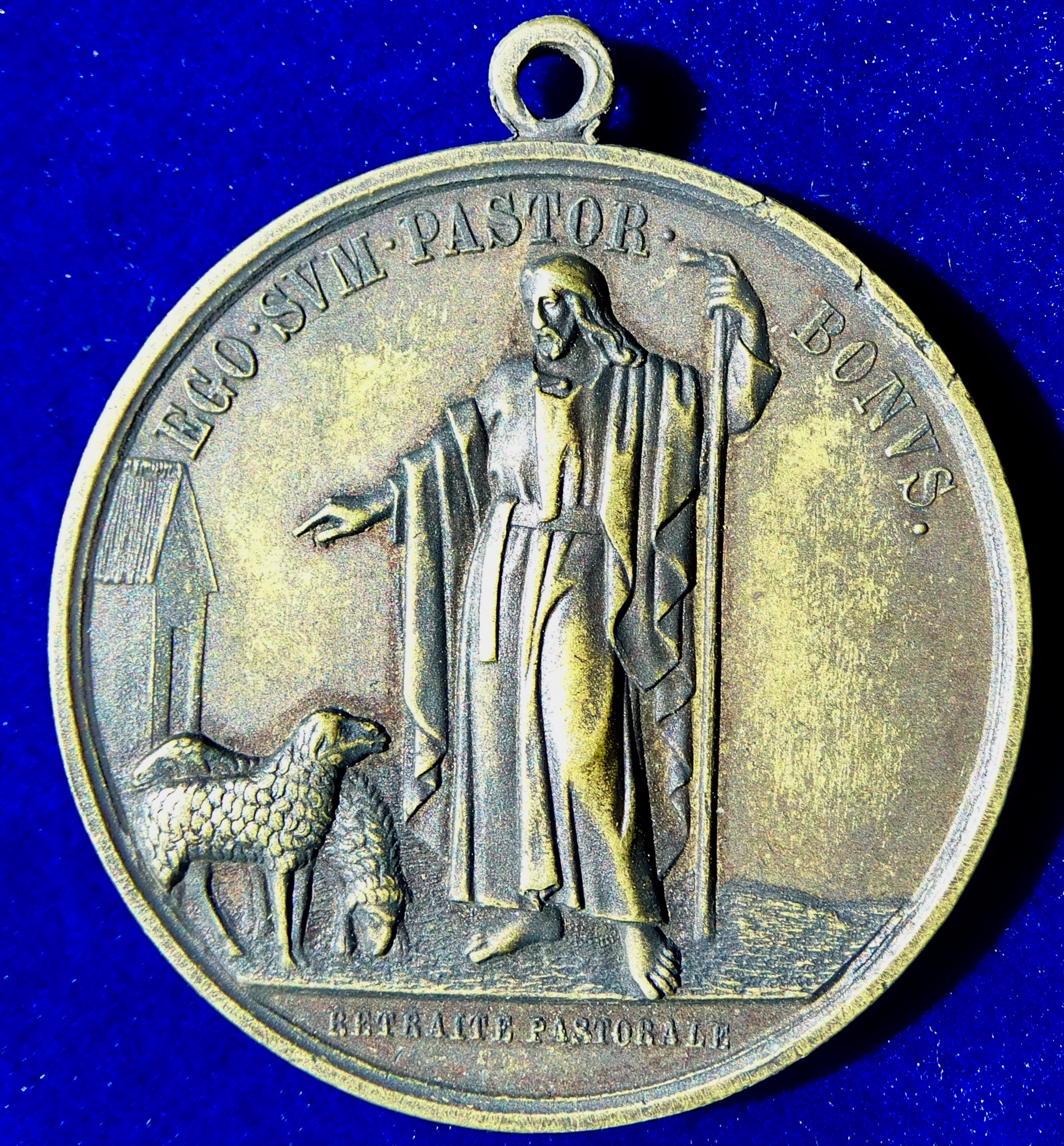
The Good Shepherd on the reverse of the medal

The 1969 revision of the General Roman Calendar transferred his memorial to 27 September, moving Saints Cosmas and Damian to 26 September to make way for him, as he is now better known in the West than they are.

Vincent is honored with a Lesser Festival on 27 September in the Church of England. The Episcopal Church liturgical calendar honors him together with Louise de Marillac on 15 March.

One of the feasts celebrated by the French Deist Church of the Theophilanthropy was dedicated to Vincent.

== Legacy ==
Niagara University in Lewiston, New York, St. John's University in New York City, and DePaul University in Chicago, Illinois, were founded in 1856, 1870, and 1898, respectively, by the Congregation of the Mission in the United States. Many high schools are named after Vincent.

Parishes are dedicated to Vincent in Los Angeles; Washington, D.C.; Omaha, Nebraska; Mays Landing, New Jersey; Mt. Vernon, Ohio. Houston, Texas; Delray Beach, Florida; Wheeling, West Virginia, Coventry, Rhode Island, Churchville, New York, Peryville, Missouri, Lenox Dale, Massachusetts, Girardville, Pennsylvania, Arlington, Texas, Denver, Colorado, Malang (Indonesia), Philippines and elsewhere.

=== In popular culture ===
==== Film ====
Vincent de Paul has been portrayed in several audiovisual productions. One of the best-known is Monsieur Vincent, a 1947 French biographical film directed by Maurice Cloche and starring Pierre Fresnay as Vincent de Paul. The film subsequently received a special Academy Award as the outstanding foreign-language film released in the United States during 1948.

In July 2026, the Colombian Vincentian evangelization network Corazón de Paúl released CONFIDO: The Story of Saint Vincent de Paul, a 16-minute short film depicting episodes from Vincent's life through the use of generative artificial intelligence. FAMVIN identified Vincentian priest Andrés Felipe Rojas Saavedra, C.M., as the film's writer and director, and described the production as using generative AI to recreate characters, voices, settings, music and historical environments.

Before its release, ACI Prensa described CONFIDO as the first short film about Saint Vincent de Paul made using generative artificial intelligence, and identified Corazón de Paúl as the organisation behind the production.

==== Digital media ====
Vincent de Paul's legacy has also been represented through contemporary digital initiatives. In 2016, FAMVIN described Corazón de Paúl as a Vincentian initiative founded in Colombia to provide information and formation for the Vincentian Family, particularly in Latin America. The publication noted that the project's name was inspired by Catherine Labouré's reported visions of the heart of Vincent de Paul.

In 2025, FAMVIN reported that Corazón de Paúl had developed an artificial-intelligence-based tool designed to consult Vincent's writings using the fourteen volumes of his collected letters and conferences. The publication identified Felipe Rojas Saavedra, director of Corazón de Paúl, as the developer of the project.

== See also ==
- Church of the Mission of France
- List of Catholic saints
- List of Superiors General of the Congregation of the Mission
- List of slaves
- Saint Vincent de Paul, patron saint archive
- Union chrétienne de Saint-Chaumond (Poitiers) – Cofounded by St. Vincent de Paul
