= David Monroe =

Canadian clergyman (born 1941)

His Excellency, The Most Reverend David John James Monroe
- Bishop Emeritus of Kamloops
- Church: Roman Catholic Church
- Province: Vancouver
- See: Kamloops
- Appointed: January 5, 2002
- Installed: March 18, 2002
- Term ended: June 1, 2016
- Predecessor: Lawrence Sabatini
- Successor: Joseph Phuong Nguyen
- Previous post: Vicar General of the Archdiocese of Vancouver (c. 1990–2002)

Orders
- Ordination: May 20, 1967 by James Carney
- Consecration: March 12, 2002 by Adam Exner

Personal details
- Born: April 14, 1941 (age 85) Vancouver, British Columbia, Canada
- Denomination: Roman Catholic
- Residence: Vancouver
- Motto: "Come and See" (Latin: Venite et Videte)
- Coat of arms

Ordination history of David Monroe
History
Priestly ordination
- Ordained by: James Carney (Vancouver aux.)
- Date: May 20, 1967
- Place: St. Anthony of Padua Parish, Vancouver, British Columbia, Canada
Episcopal consecration
- Principal consecrator: Adam Exner (Vancouver)
- Co-consecrators: Peter Joseph Mallon (Regina); Raymond Roussin (Victoria in Ins. Vanc.)
- Date: March 12, 2002
- Place: Queen Elizabeth Theatre, Vancouver, British Columbia, Canada

Styles of David Monroe
- Reference style: His Excellency; The Most Reverend
- Spoken style: Your Excellency
- Religious style: Bishop

David John James Monroe (born April 14, 1941) is a Canadian prelate of the Roman Catholic Church. He was ordained Bishop of the Diocese of Kamloops on March 12, 2002, and served in that post until 2016. He was succeeded by Bishop Joseph Phuong Nguyen.

== History ==
David John James Monroe was born on April 14, 1941, in Vancouver, British Columbia, where he was also raised and went to school. Monroe completed his secondary school education at St. Patrick's Secondary School. In 2010, he experienced severe injuries following an attack in a church, perpetrated by an individual reportedly grappling with mental illness. As a result of the assault, Monroe required hospitalization for nearly two months.

== Ordination ==
Monroe attended Christ the King Seminary and was ordained on May 20, 1967, by James Carney at St. Anthony's Church.

== Diocese of Kamloops ==
On March 18, 2002, Monroe was installed as the Bishop of Kamloops.

Catholic Church titles
Preceded by	Vicar General of the Archdiocese of Vancouver c. 1990–2002	Succeeded by Richard Gagnon
Vacant Title last held by Lawrence Sabatini	Bishop of Kamloops; 2002–2016	Succeeded by Joseph Phuong Nguyen
