= Lawrence Sabatini =

American priest (born 1930)

His Excellency, The Most Reverend Lawrence Sabatini CS
- Bishop Emeritus of Kamloops
- Church: Roman Catholic Church
- See: Kamloops
- Appointed: October 1, 1982
- Term ended: September 2, 1999
- Predecessor: Adam Exner
- Successor: David Monroe
- Previous posts: Auxiliary Bishop of Vancouver (1978–1982); Titular Bishop of Nasai (1978–1982)

Orders
- Ordination: March 19, 1957
- Consecration: September 21, 1978 by James Carney

Personal details
- Born: May 15, 1930 (age 96) Chicago, Illinois, United States
- Denomination: Roman Catholic
- Residence: Chicago; Rome; Staten Island; Vancouver; Kamloops

Ordination history of Lawrence Sabatini
History
Episcopal consecration
- Principal consecrator: James Carney (Vancouver)
- Co-consecrators: John O'Grady (Prince George); Remi De Roo (Victoria)

Styles of Lawrence Sabatini
- Reference style: His Excellency, The Most Reverend
- Spoken style: Your Excellency
- Religious style: Bishop

Lawrence Sabatini, CS (born May 15, 1930) is an American retired bishop of the Catholic Church. Born and raised in Chicago, he felt a religious calling to join the priesthood during primary school. After completing school, he studied for the priesthood in Rome and joined the Scalabrinians upon returning to the United States. He was ordained a priest in 1957 and went on to teach at the institute's missions and the seminary on Staten Island for 11 years, before being sent to Canada in 1971.

Sabatini served as parish priest in North Vancouver until 1978, when he was appointed auxiliary bishop of the Archdiocese of Vancouver and was consecrated that same year. Four years later, he was transferred to Kamloops after being chosen to be its ordinary. During his time there, Sabatini enthusiastically backed reconciliation with First Nations, as well as the provincial government's efforts to negotiate treaties with them. He resigned as bishop in 1999 and returned to his hometown of Chicago. At the request of the Archbishop of Chicago, he served as pastor of a previously Italian parish that had become overwhelmingly Hispanic due to a demographic shift. He has also authored several books during his retirement.

== Early life ==
Sabatini was born in Chicago, Illinois, on May 15, 1930, in the Santa Maria Addolorata Parish on the Northwest Side of the city. Both his parents were Italian immigrants from Valbona, in the province of Lucca, Tuscany. He has two brothers (Ralph and Joseph) and two sisters (Olga and Genevieve); both sisters predeceased him. Sabatini felt a calling to the priesthood in grade four, when he was an altar server at his parish school, which was overseen by the Missionaries of St. Charles Borromeo (the Scalabrinians). He studied in Rome during the late 1950s and joined the Scalabrinians by the time he completed his studies and came back home. On March 19, 1957, he was ordained to the priesthood.

== Presbyteral ministry ==
Sabatini's first assignment was to Staten Island in New York City. There, he was professor at St. Charles Seminary, teaching moral theology and canon law. He also taught at missions run by the Scalabrinians from 1960 to 1972, where he worked with the "troubled youth" of the borough. In September 1971, Sabatini was relocated to British Columbia, Canada, and served as the third pastor of St. Stephen's Parish in North Vancouver. He concurrently held three posts in the archdiocesan chancery.

== Episcopal ministry ==
=== Auxiliary bishop of Vancouver (1978–1982) ===
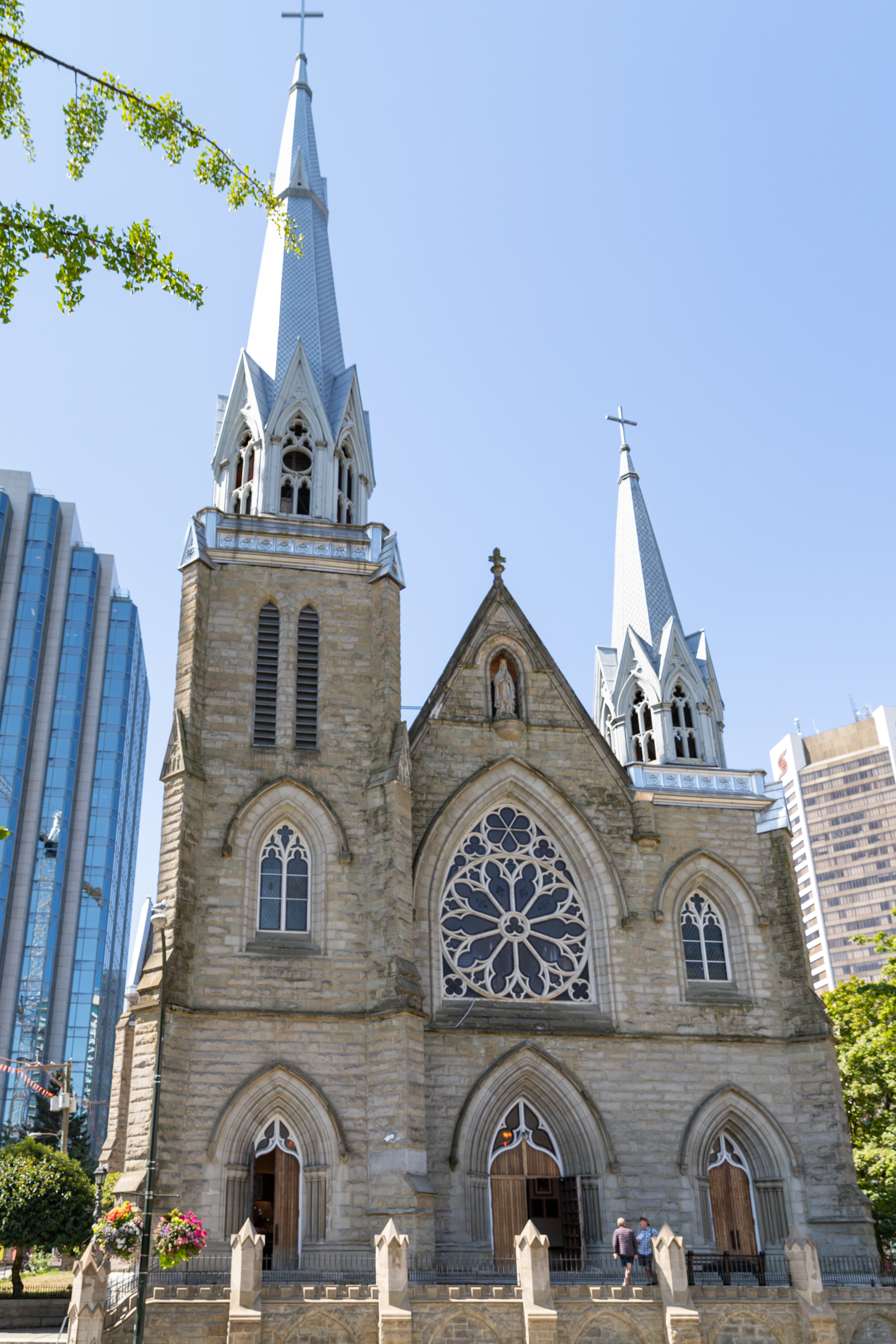
Holy Rosary Cathedral in Vancouver, the church where Sabatini was ordained bishop.

Sabatini was appointed auxiliary bishop of Vancouver and titular bishop of Nasai on July 13, 1978. He was consecrated bishop on September 21, 1978, at Holy Rosary Cathedral in Vancouver. James Carney, the Archbishop of Vancouver, served as the principal consecrator, with Cardinal George Flahiff of Winnipeg being one of several bishops in attendance. As a member of the Canadian Conference of Catholic Bishops, Sabatini was part of the Episcopal Commissions for Canon Law and for Migration and Tourism. He was also a consultant on the Pontifical Council for the Pastoral Care of Migrants and Itinerant People (a department of the Roman Curia). In the early 1980s, it was Sabatini who proposed that the Daughters of Saint Mary of Providence start Vanspec, a catechetics program in the Archdiocese tailored for children with special needs. The sisters began the program in 1982 and continued running it until 2017.

=== Bishop of Kamloops (1982–1999) ===
Sabatini was appointed Bishop of Kamloops on October 1, 1982. The see had been vacant since March 31 of that same year, when Adam Exner was appointed as Archbishop of Winnipeg. During his tenure as ordinary of that diocese, Sabatini was noted for being a vehement proponent of the treaty negotiation process with First Nations that was being undertaken by the government of British Columbia. He also advocated for reconciliation with First Nations over the Catholic Church's involvement with the country's residential school system, the majority of which were run by the church. He formally apologized to the Alkali Lake Indian Band on behalf of the church in December 1998.

Sabatini was present at the 1984 and 1987 papal visits of Pope John Paul II. He also attended the 44th International Eucharistic Congress held in Seoul, South Korea in October 1989, and led a pilgrimage to the Holy Land. On May 12, 1990, Sabatini ordained both Mark Hagemoen – who would later become bishop in 2013 – and Paul Than Bui as priests for the Archdiocese of Vancouver. Normally, Carney would have been ordaining bishop under canon 1015, §2 of the 1983 Code of Canon Law, but because he was ill with cancer at the time, Sabatini ordained the two priests on his behalf. When Carney died in September of that same year, it was Sabatini who presided over his funeral Mass at Holy Rosary Cathedral. In the homily he delivered, Sabatini read from letters Carney wrote during the last days of his life addressed to the faithful in the Archdiocese.

== Retirement ==
After 16 years of serving as Bishop of Kamloops, Sabatini's resignation was accepted on September 2, 1999. Subsequently, he returned to his hometown of Chicago and retreated from active ministry. However, Francis George – the Archbishop of Chicago – asked him to become pastor of Holy Rosary Church, a formerly Italian parish on the Northwest Side (the area of Chicago he was born and raised). Before assuming the role on June 1, 2000, Sabatini visited Mexico, in order to gain a better understanding of the language and culture of the church's now predominantly Hispanic parishioners. He celebrated the golden jubilee of his priestly ordination in March 2007, and retired as parish priest the following year.

== Published books ==
- Sabatini, Lawrence (2010). My Journey: Musings of a Missionary. Chelsea, Michigan. ISBN 9780615346960.
- ———————— (2010). Thoughts of a Retired Bishop: Talks from My Work and Life. Mary Brown. ISBN 9780615418193.
- ———————— (2011). Mark the Lion: Sunday Homilettes – Year B. Mary Brown. ISBN 9780615517490.
- ———————— (2012). Sacrament Most Holy, Sacrament Most Divine: Mystery of Faith. Mary Brown. ISBN 9780615716060.

Catholic Church titles
Vacant Title last held by James Carney	Auxiliary Bishop of Vancouver; 1978–1982	Vacant
Preceded by Adam Exner	Bishop of Kamloops; 1982–1999	Sede vacante Title next held by David Monroe
Preceded by Aldo Mongiano	— TITULAR — Bishop of Nasai; 1978–1982	Succeeded by Jorge Mario Avila del Aguila
