= Joseph Phuong Nguyen =

Canadian Catholic prelate (born 1957)

The Most Reverend Joseph Phuong Nguyen
- Bishop of Kamloops
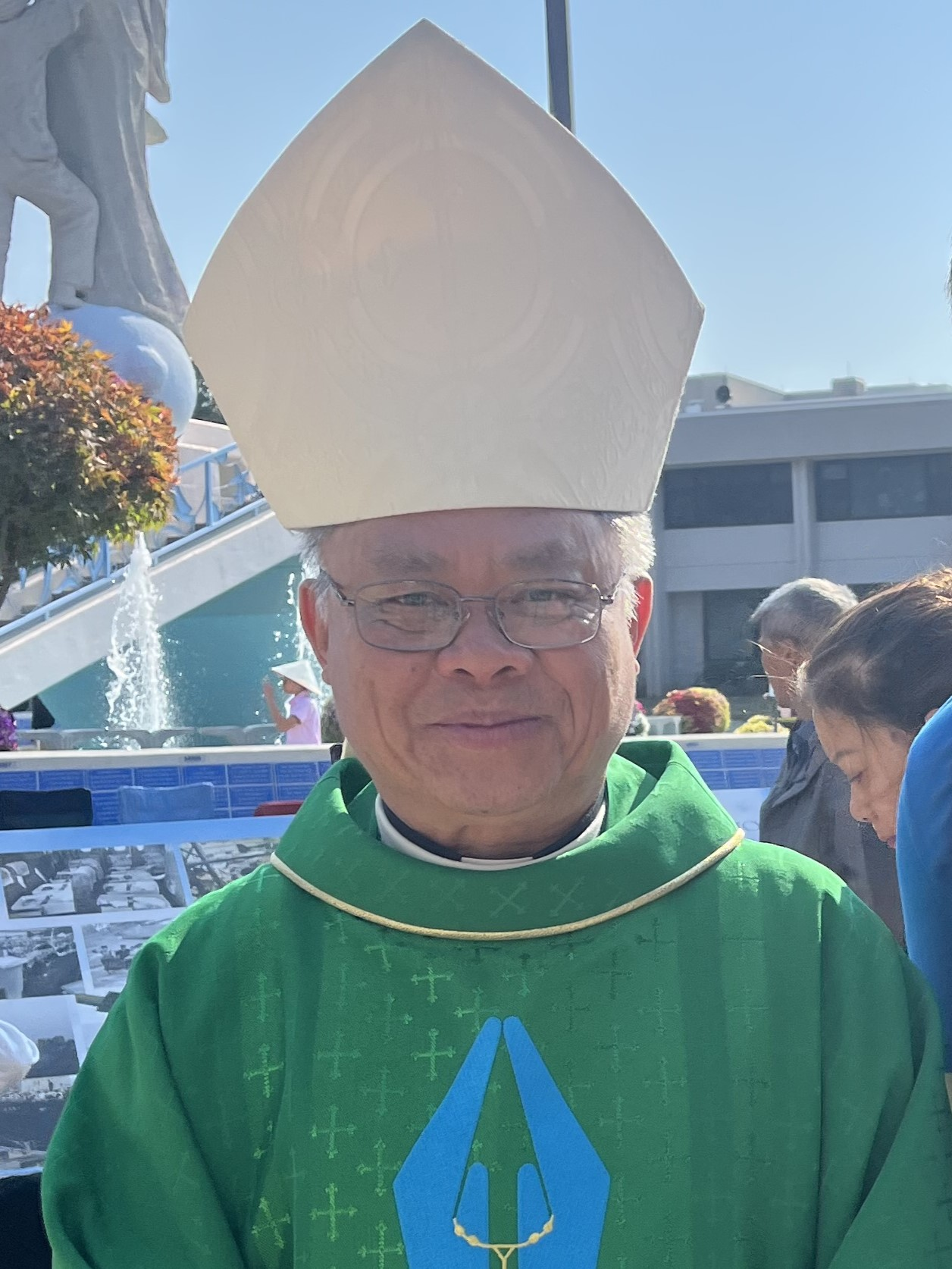
- Nguyen in 2025 at the Marian Days pilgrimage in Carthage, Missouri.
- Native name: Giuse Nguyễn Thế Phương
- Church: Catholic
- Province: Vancouver
- Diocese: Kamloops
- Appointed: June 1, 2016
- Installed: August 25, 2016
- Predecessor: David Monroe
- Previous post: Vicar General, Archdiocese of Vancouver (2013–2016)

Orders
- Ordination: May 30, 1992 by Adam Exner
- Consecration: August 25, 2016 by J. Michael Miller

Personal details
- Born: March 25, 1957 (age 69) Đắk Lắk, Republic of Việt Nam
- Motto: State in Domino; (Stand firm in the Lord); (Đứng vững trong Chúa)

Ordination history
History
Priestly ordination
- Ordained by: Adam Exner (Vancouver)
Episcopal consecration
- Principal consecrator: J. Michael Miller (Vancouver)
- Co-consecrators: David Monroe (Kamloops em.); Stephen Jensen (Prince George)
- Styles
- Reference style: The Most Reverend
- Spoken style: Your Excellency
- Religious style: Your Excellency

Joseph Phuong The Nguyen (born March 25, 1957) is a Vietnamese Canadian Catholic prelate serving as Bishop of Kamloops since 2016. He was previously vicar general for the Archdiocese of Vancouver.

== Early life ==
Nguyễn Thế Phương was born on March 25, 1957 in Đắk Lắk, South Vietnam. He is the eldest of ten children, with one brother who is a priest of the Diocese of Hamilton and two sisters who are religious. He additionally has a cousin who is a priest in his home diocese of Ban Mê Thuột.

Nguyen had a deep love for God at an early age and became a minor seminarian at age 11. When the communist government took control of Catholic institutions, Nguyen continued to live out of his office and was imprisoned multiple times for training catechists.

Nguyen realized that there would be no opportunity to be ordained a priest in Vietnam. He secretly attempted to flee, telling only his father the plan, but he was caught and forced to return to shore. He and his group were then captured and imprisoned by the government, suffering torture and malnutrition. He then made another attempt to escape the country by boat with another group. This time, the boat was rescued by a German ship and was brought to the Filipino Palawan refugee camp. He was shortly thereafter injured in an auto accident, remaining in a coma for several months.

In 1987, Nguyen came to Vancouver, Canada, as a refugee. He was initially discouraged from pursuing the priesthood due to the difficulties he faced while fleeing Vietnam. Still, his father encouraged him to continue, and he took a job as a painter and studied English as a second language. Eventually, he was accepted at the Seminary of Christ the King in Mission. He was also sent to St. Peter's Seminary in London, Ontario, to finish his degree in theology.

== Priesthood ==
On May 30, 1992, Nguyen was ordained as a priest in Holy Rosary Cathedral by Archbishop Adam Exner for the Archdiocese of Vancouver.

== Bishop of Kamloops ==
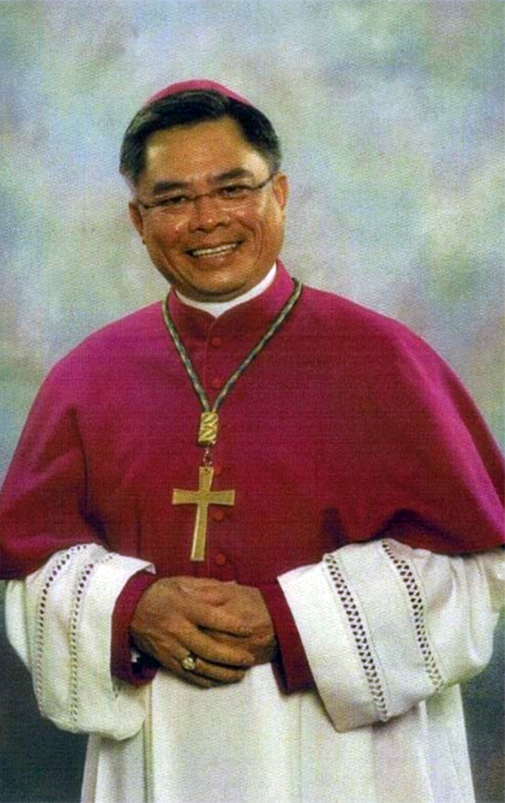
Portrait of Nguyen on his episcopal ordination booklet in 2016.

On June 1, 2016, Pope Francis appointed Nguyen as the Bishop for the Diocese of Kamloops. The episcopal ordination and installation as bishop took place on August 25, 2016, at the Sandman Centre, with Archbishop J. Michael Miller of Vancouver as the principal celebrant.

Catholic Church titles
Preceded by Stephen Jensen	Vicar General of the Archdiocese of Vancouver; 2013–2016	Succeeded by Gary Franken
Preceded by David Monroe	Bishop of Kamloops; 2016–present	Incumbent
