= Sacred Heart Cathedral (Kamloops) =

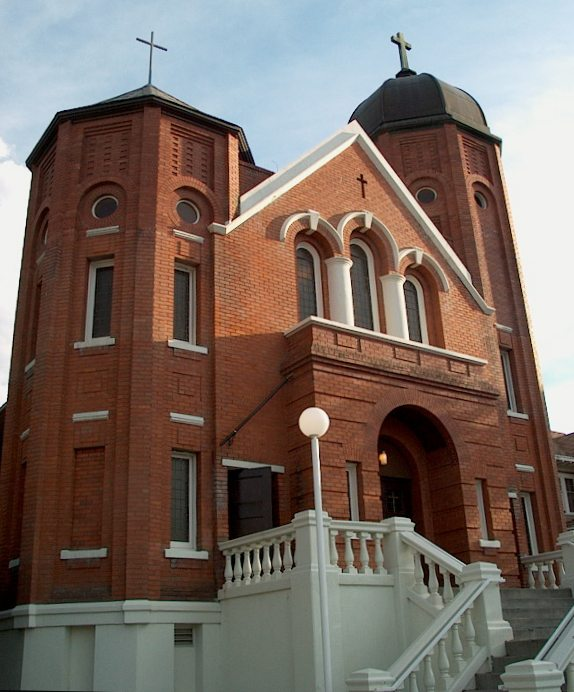
- Sacred Heart Cathedral in the summer of 2004
- Sacred Heart Cathedral
- 50.6721°N 120.3347°W
- Location: 255 Nicola Street, Kamloops
- Country: Canada
- Denomination: Roman Catholic

History
- Status: Cathedral
- Consecrated: December 1925

Architecture
- Functional status: Active
- Architect(s): Parlett and Macaulay
- Style: Romanesque
- Groundbreaking: 1921

Administration
- Diocese: Roman Catholic Diocese of Kamloops

Clergy
- Bishop: Joseph Phuong Nguyen

Sacred Heart Cathedral is a Romanesque-style church that serves as the cathedral of the Roman Catholic Diocese of Kamloops. It is located in the downtown area of Kamloops at the intersection of Nicola Street and 3rd Avenue.

The construction of the cathedral began in 1921, a few blocks from the site of an earlier church by the same name that had burned down two years earlier. It opened in December 1925 and is now listed on the city's Heritage Walking Tour by the City of Kamloops Museum and Archives.

== History ==
=== Original structure (1887–1919) ===
The original church was situated between 1st and 2nd Avenue on Battle Street and was constructed out of wood. Robert Henry Lee was hired to be the architect, while Alfred and William Hill were responsible for the construction. When it opened on December 17, 1887, Sacred Heart church became the first Roman Catholic church built in Kamloops. The first mass was said by Father LeJeune. A mission house was built adjacent to the church in 1889.

On Ash Wednesday of 1919 (March 5), the church along with its rectory were destroyed by fire. Shortly afterwards, the accompanying mission house was demolished.

=== Present-day cathedral ===
Construction of a new church began at a new site on Nicola Street and 3rd Avenue in 1921. W.H. Macaulay was chosen to be the architect. Masses were initially conducted in the church basement until the church was completed in December 1925.

== Architecture ==
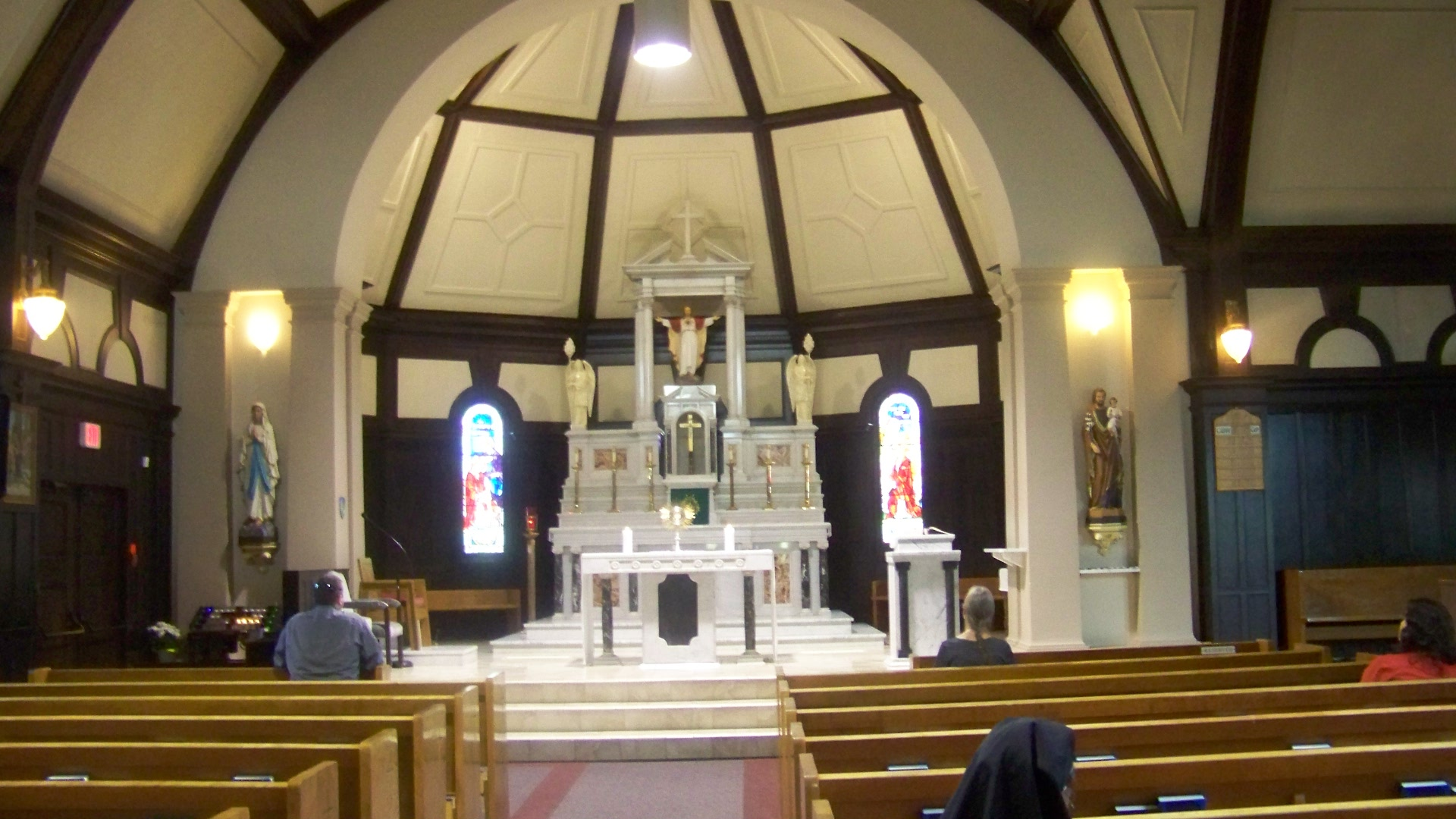
Interior of the Cathedral

The cathedral was built in a Romanesque style and is noted for its stained glass windows, the ornate high altar and reredos, the balustrade at the staircase in the front entrance, the bell tower topped with a dome and the use of red brick for the exterior. The cathedral was later expanded when a west wing was constructed.
