= James Carney (bishop) =

Canadian archbishop (1915–1990)

His Grace, The Most Reverend James Francis Carney
- Archbishop of Vancouver
- See: Vancouver
- Installed: 1969
- Term ended: 1990
- Predecessor: Martin Michael Johnson
- Successor: Adam Exner
- Previous posts: Auxiliary Bishop of Vancouver (1966–1969); Titular Bishop of Obori (1966–1969)

Orders
- Ordination: March 21, 1942 by William Mark Duke
- Consecration: February 11, 1966 by Sergio Pignedoli

Personal details
- Born: James Francis Carney; June 28, 1915 Vancouver, British Columbia
- Died: September 16, 1990 (aged 75) Vancouver, British Columbia
- Denomination: Roman Catholic
- Motto: Servare Unitatem (English: To preserve unity)

Ordination history of James Carney
History
Priestly ordination
- Ordained by: William Mark Duke
Episcopal consecration
- Principal consecrator: Sergio Pignedoli
- Co-consecrators: Martin Michael Johnson; Michael Cornelius O'Neill
Episcopal succession
Bishops consecrated by James Carney as principal consecrator
- Lawrence Sabatini: September 21, 1978
- Peter Mallon: February 2, 1990

Styles of James Carney
- Reference style: His Grace; The Most Reverend
- Spoken style: Your Grace; Your Excellency
- Religious style: Archbishop

James Francis Carney (June 28, 1915 – September 16, 1990) was a Canadian archbishop of the Roman Catholic Church. He served as the eighth Archbishop of Vancouver, British Columbia, from 1964 until he died in 1990. He was the first Archbishop of Vancouver born in the city of Vancouver.

== Early life ==
Carney was born on June 28, 1915, in what was then considered the "southern part" of Vancouver, British Columbia, Canada. His family was Irish Catholic. He had two brothers—John and Bernard—and one sister, Josephine, who became a nun and is Carney's last surviving sibling. His height was described as "towering".

== Ordination and priestly life ==
On March 21, 1942, James Carney was ordained a priest by Archbishop William Mark Duke in Vancouver. He first worked at the Holy Rosary Cathedral as an assistant pastor from 1942 to 1950. In addition to assisting at the cathedral, Carney also served as editor of The B.C. Catholic newspaper and chancellor of the archdiocese.

In 1950, Carney was transferred to St. Patrick's Church, where he worked for four years. Subsequently, he was chosen as assistant pastor to Corpus Christi and shortly afterwards he became the pastor of the parish. In 1964, Carney was appointed as the Archdiocese's vicar general. As a result, he was allowed to use the title "Monsignor". After two years, he was ordained as auxiliary bishop of Vancouver on February 11, 1966, by Cardinal Sergio Pignedoli, with then-Archbishop of Vancouver Martin Michael Johnson and Michael O’Neill of Regina acting as the co-consecrators.

== Archbishop of Vancouver ==
After Archbishop Johnson resigned in 1969, Carney was chosen to succeed him and was installed as Archbishop of Vancouver on February 11, 1969. By assuming the position, Carney became the first Archbishop of Vancouver to have been born in Vancouver.

According to The Vancouver Sun, Carney ruled during what was described as "the most tumultuous years" endured by the archdiocese. With the Second Vatican Council having just been completed, many Catholics in Vancouver who saw the council as a call for "revolution" viewed Carney as an ultra-conservative. This is because Carney gave his full support to Pope Paul VI's controversial encyclical Humanae Vitae. Furthermore, he declined to accept money from the United Way of Canada, as they were also funding pro-choice groups. As a result of his socially conservative stances, there were many deep divisions from within the archdiocese throughout Carney's tenure. Though he was known for his tall, imposing and yet shy demeanour, Carney was involved in controversy and labelled "anti-union" when he ordered a Catholic school( Marion High School for Girls in Burnaby) to close after its teachers had joined a labour union.

Under Carney's episcopacy, several key institutions in the archdiocese were created. In 1980, he asked the Sisters of Charity of the Immaculate Conception to create an archive office for the archdiocese. Six years later, Carney helped organize the Catholic Charities Justice Services in order to help those who are imprisoned. Known for his steadfast support of priestly vocations, Carney was chosen by Pope John Paul II to be a member of the Congregation for the Clergy in 1986.

== Death ==
Carney developed cancer in 1989 and subsequently submitted his resignation in June of the following year in accordance with church policy, having reached the mandatory retirement age of 75. However, it had not been accepted at the time he died. Instead, he was invited to attend the Synod of Bishops, being the only Canadian cleric invited to the meeting held in late September 1990. He turned down the offer because of his frail health. On September 16, 1990, Carney died after suffering from cancer for fourteen months. He is buried inside the Resurrection Mausoleum at the Gardens of Gethsemani cemetery in Surrey, British Columbia.

== Legacy ==
The Archbishop Carney Regional Secondary School, located in Port Coquitlam, British Columbia, was built and named in his honour. Carney also mandated that St. Paul's Hospital open its doors without hesitation to people with AIDS, even as other hospitals turned them away.

Religious titles
Vacant Title last held by Edward Jennings	Auxiliary Bishop of Vancouver; 1966–1969	Vacant Title next held by Lawrence Sabatini
Preceded by Martin Michael Johnson	Archbishop of Vancouver; 1969–1990	Succeeded by Adam Exner
Diocese restored as a titular see	— TITULAR — Bishop of Obori; 1966–1969	Succeeded by Luigi Zanzottera
