= Adam Exner =

Canadian Catholic archbishop (1928–2023)

His Grace The Most Reverend Adam Exner OMI
- Archbishop of Vancouver
- See: Vancouver
- Appointed: May 25, 1991
- Installed: August 15, 1991
- Term ended: January 10, 2004
- Predecessor: James Carney
- Successor: Raymond Roussin
- Previous posts: Bishop of Kamloops (1974–1982); Archbishop of Winnipeg (1982–1991)

Orders
- Ordination: July 7, 1957 by Luigi Faveri
- Consecration: March 12, 1974 by Henri Légaré

Personal details
- Born: December 24, 1928 Killaly, Saskatchewan, Canada
- Died: September 5, 2023 (aged 94) Grayson, Saskatchewan, Canada
- Denomination: Roman Catholic
- Education: Pontifical Gregorian University; University of Ottawa
- Motto: "To Serve As He Served"
- Coat of arms: Adam Exner's coat of arms

Ordination history
History
Priestly ordination
- Ordained by: Luigi Faveri (Tivoli)
- Date: July 7, 1957
- Place: Roviano, Rome, Italy
Episcopal consecration
- Principal consecrator: Henri Légaré (Grouard–McLennan)
- Co-consecrators: James Carney (Vancouver); Charles Halpin (Regina)
- Date: March 12, 1974
- Place: Saskatchewan Centre of the Arts, Regina, Saskatchewan, Canada
Episcopal succession
Bishops consecrated by Adam Exner as principal consecrator
- Gerald Wiesner: February 22, 1993
- David Monroe: March 12, 2002

Styles of Adam Exner
- Reference style: His Grace; The Most Reverend
- Spoken style: Your Grace; Your Excellency
- Religious style: Archbishop

Adam Joseph Exner OMI (December 24, 1928 – September 5, 2023) was a Canadian bishop of the Catholic Church. He was the Archbishop of Vancouver from 1991 until 2004, having previously served as the Bishop of Kamloops and Archbishop of Winnipeg. Prior to his appointment as bishop, he was a professor at seminaries run by his religious order.

Exner was born and raised in Saskatchewan, where he completed his secondary education. He entered the Oblate novitiate outside Winnipeg, before studying for the priesthood at the Pontifical Gregorian University in Rome. He was ordained a priest in 1957. Upon returning to Canada, he completed a doctoral degree in moral theology and went on to teach at seminaries in his home province and Alberta. He was appointed Bishop of Kamloops in 1974 and was consecrated that same year. Eight years later, he became Archbishop of Winnipeg, a position he held for nearly a decade before being transferred to Vancouver in 1991. Exner was noted for calling the first diocesan synod in Vancouver that allowed for the laity to participate.

== Early life ==
Adam Joseph Exner was born in Killaly, Saskatchewan, on Christmas Eve of 1928. He was the youngest of eight children of Joseph and Frances (Gelowitz). His parents were Bukovina Germans who moved to Canada as children. His father was originally from Molodiia, while his mother came from Derelui. Both families lived on a homestead in Mariahilf, outside Killaly, having emigrated from Eastern Europe at the turn of the 20th century. This was the result of a population boom combined with a scarcity of land in the area.

Exner grew up in a humble farming household that lacked electricity, tap water, and central heating. Although his mother was illiterate, she made sure Exner and his siblings received comprehensive instruction on the Baltimore Catechism. Mass was not celebrated every Sunday at the local church, so the family gathered around the kitchen table for what he called a "para-liturgy" when it was not held. This entailed singing hymns, going through the readings and Gospel of the day, talking about the texts and its relevance to their everyday lives, and concluded with praying the Rosary. Exner completed his primary education at Flegel School, a single-room rural school located 2.5 miles (4.02 km) away from where he lived. There, he was instructed by only one teacher through the whole of his elementary years. He started learning the accordion without the help of a teacher before enrolling in kindergarten. He continued to play polkas and waltzes on the instrument well after he became bishop. Exner left school temporarily after eighth grade, in order to work on the family farm. As the youngest child, he was in line to inherit the property, in keeping with the tradition in his family. Consequently, he intended to become a farmer had he not joined the priesthood.

Exner felt a calling to the priesthood in the summer of 1946. He resumed his studies that September, first at St. Joseph's College in Yorkton before transferring to St. Thomas College in Battleford one year later. After graduating from the latter institute, he went on to study one year of arts and subsequently joined the Missionary Oblates of Mary Immaculate novitiate at St. Norbert in August 1950. Starting in 1951, he attended seminary at the Pontifical Gregorian University in Rome. He obtained two master's degrees from that institution (one in philosophy and the other in theology). On July 7, 1957, Exner was ordained to the Catholic priesthood in Roviano, on the outskirts of Rome, by Luigi Faveri, the Bishop of Tivoli at the time.

== Presbyteral ministry ==
Exner went back to Canada in 1958. He proceeded to complete a Doctorate of Theology at the University of Ottawa within two years. Because of the accelerated pace, he described this time as "probably the hardest two years of my life". He subsequently taught at the Oblate seminary of St. Charles Scholasticate in Battleford as professor of moral theology from 1960 to 1972 and served as its rector for six of those years. This is in spite of the fact that he did not envisage himself teaching and had expressed his preference to be assigned to a foreign mission instead. After the Oblate seminary was relocated to Edmonton in 1972, Exner followed along and taught at the Newman Theological College up until his appointment as bishop. He also led several retreats during this time, primarily for his fellow clergymen and religious.

== Episcopal ministry ==
=== Bishop of Kamloops (1974–1982) ===
Exner was appointed the third Bishop of Kamloops on January 18, 1974, by Pope Paul VI. The see had been vacant since August 1 of the previous year, when Michael Harrington died in office after more than two decades at the helm. Exner later recounted how he had no intention of becoming a bishop. He cited his lack of pastoral and administrative experience as reasons why he would be unsuitable for the position. He remonstrated with Joseph MacNeil, the Archbishop of Edmonton who had informed him of the Holy See's decision, but to no avail. Exner ultimately acquiesced to the appointment only out of obedience to the church. He was consecrated bishop on March 12, 1974, at the Saskatchewan Centre of the Arts in Regina. Henri Légaré, the Archbishop of Grouard–McLennan and his close friend who taught Exner catechism as a child, served as the principal consecrator, with Exner's siblings and their 80-year-old mother in attendance. He was installed in Kamloops sixteen days later on March 28 by Guido del Mestri, the Apostolic Pro-Nuncio to Canada.

Exner stated that he did not want anyone to behave differently towards him after his elevation to the episcopacy. He added how his "ideal of a bishop is someone who is close to his people. I want to be a father and a father is close to his people". His sojourn in Kamloops was the first time in his life that he lived by himself. He had previously always resided in a community, either with his fellow Oblates or in the seminaries where he taught. He remarked that this change was "not easy", but he eventually "got used to it". Having adapted to living in a new province, he was prepared to stay in Kamloops indefinitely.

In 1977, parishioners in Kamloops reported their parish priest, Erlindo Molon, to Exner, alleging that Molon was sexually and physically abusing others. One parishioner told Exner that she received a marriage proposal from Molon; Exner encouraged her to attend a different church. After months of hearing these accusations, Exner asked Molon to transfer parishes, which Molon refused. A civil judgment in 2020 determined that church leadership, including Exner, failed to take appropriate steps to prevent Molon's abuse of a parishioner.

=== Archbishop of Winnipeg (1982–1991) ===
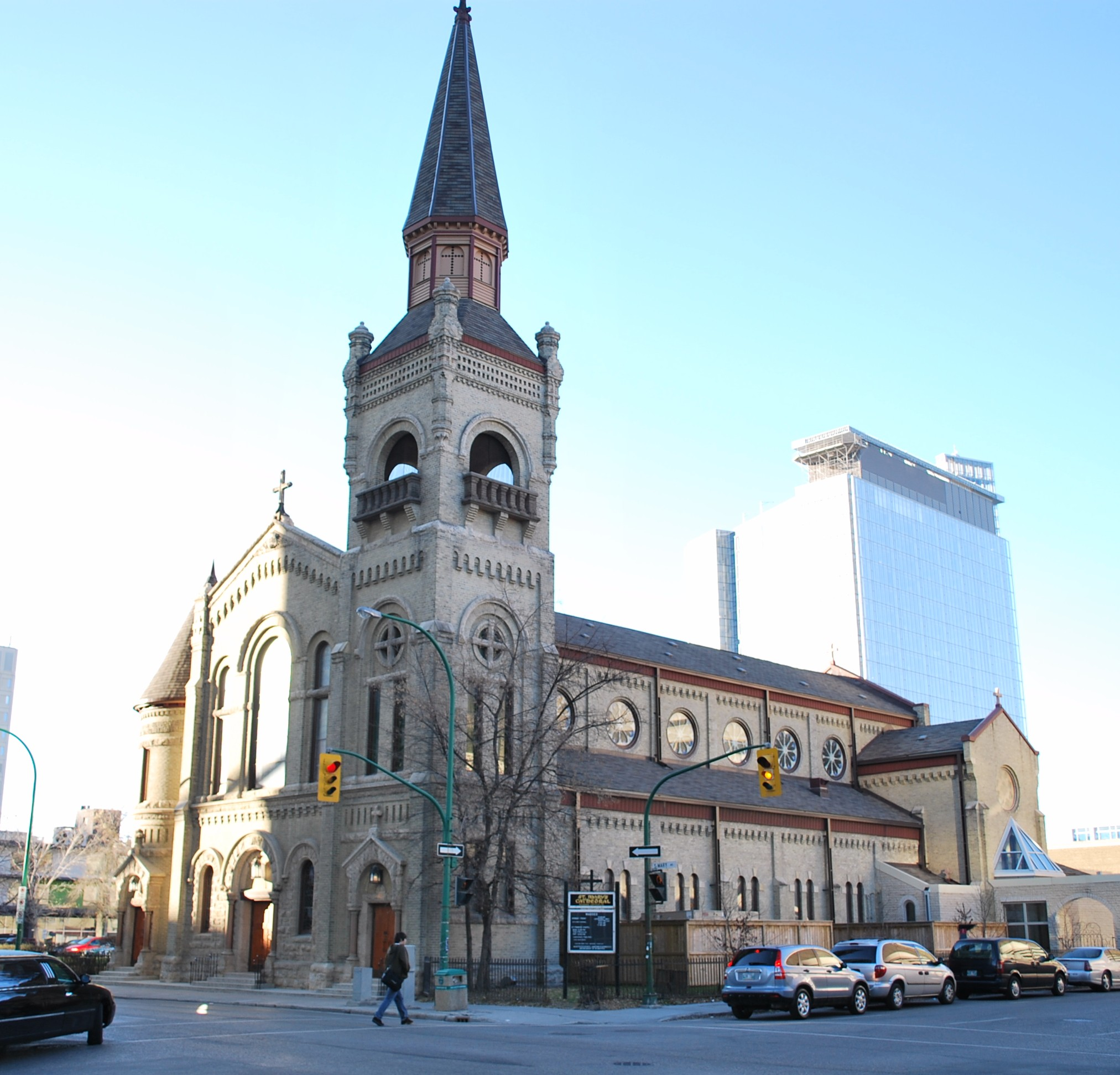
St. Mary's Cathedral in Downtown Winnipeg was renovated from 1987 to 1988, during Exner's tenure as archbishop.

The Holy See's selection of Exner as the fourth Archbishop of Winnipeg was announced on April 8, 1982. (Note: The Roman Catholic Archdiocese of Winnipeg lists Exner's date of appointment as April 8, 1982. The date used is from the article by The Canadian Press, which states that "[h]is appointment was announced Wednesday" (i.e. April 7, 1982).) He was installed at St. Mary's Cathedral on June 23 of that same year. (Note: The Roman Catholic Archdiocese of Winnipeg lists Exner's date of installation as June 24, 1982.) His predecessor, Cardinal George Flahiff, perceived Exner to be "well experienced" and a "man of good judgment" and predicted a promising future for the archdiocese with him in charge. Exner saw his transfer to Winnipeg as a homecoming of sorts. Even though he barely knew anyone there, he sensed that the local Catholic community were delighted to have a "home-grown prairie boy" as their new archbishop. He sold the large Charleswood house on the riverfront where his predecessors resided – which he regarded as too lavish and which would have required a costly renovation – and initially moved into the chaplain's quarters at St. Mary's Academy, before settling into a residence on Bishops Lane.

Exner welcomed Pope John Paul II to Winnipeg in September 1984, as part of the latter's first visit to Canada. During his tenure as ordinary of that archdiocese, the cathedral underwent large-scale restoration work. These repairs – which were intended to be finished by September 1987 in order to coincide with the centenary of the cathedral's consecration – were only completed in early 1988. He also directed the cessation of a monthly Tridentine Mass in late 1986, pointing to declining attendance as the reason for abandoning the 22-month long trial run within the archdiocese.

In 1990, Exner established a church committee with the archbishop of Saint Boniface Antoine Hacault and the Assembly of Manitoba Chiefs to respond to complaints about the treatment of Indigenous children in the Canadian Indian residential school system.

=== Archbishop of Vancouver (1991–2004) ===
Exner was appointed the Archbishop of Vancouver on May 25, 1991, and installed at Holy Rosary Cathedral on August 15 of that year. Although he was billed as "Canada's most outspoken conservative prelate" by Joel Connelly of the Seattle Post-Intelligencer, Exner eschewed the use of such categorizations, considering himself as "middle-of-the-road". He found that he was sometimes "labelled as too conservative, and sometimes as too liberal" and that his goal was simply to "combat the idea that Catholics can pick and choose which dogma to accept". In contrast to his immediate predecessor, James Carney, Exner was perceived as being comfortable speaking to the media, having personally responded to a phone call by the Vancouver Sun shortly after his appointment without having to go through a secretary.

Exner acted as principal consecrator at the episcopal ordination of Gerald Wiesner, held in Prince George, British Columbia, on February 22, 1993. On June 16, 1996, he wrote a letter that described contreception as repressing sexuality and "bogus freedom"; this letter was read to all the congregations in his archdiocese. After Wiesner's predecessor, Hubert O'Connor, was convicted in July 1996 of the rape and indecent assault of two Indigenous women at a residential school where he was principal, Exner offered assistance to the victims in their healing process and asked that O'Connor be forgiven. He emphasized that he was not asking for anyone to condone what O'Connor did, adding that "there's a big difference between condoning and forgiveness". However, Exner's observation that O'Connor had "already suffered enough, to the point where his health has suffered and deteriorated" drew the ire of some members of the public. Exner admitted that he "made a real mistake in speaking of the pain of the women and that of Bishop O'Connor in the same breath". He also made a formal apology for O'Connor's actions. O'Connor's convictions were later quashed by the British Columbia Court of Appeal in March 1998.

Exner was a delegate at the Synod of Bishops for Asia, held in Rome from April to May 1998. He was the only bishop from Canada to be invited to that meeting. Exner reckoned that this was in recognition of Vancouver's sizable immigrant population from Asia that is apparent in its parishes. In October of that same year, he called a local diocesan synod. It was the first to be held in nearly four decades and the first synod in the history of the Archdiocese to allow the lay faithful to participate in the process.

Less than one month after the September 11 attacks, Exner hosted a gathering of religious leaders at the cathedral's church hall. They issued a collective statement denouncing violence committed in the name of religion, and underlining their dedication to work together for the public good in "brave new works of peace". The statement was ultimately read out in the House of Commons and the Senate. Exner served as the principal consecrator at the episcopal ordination of David Monroe on March 12, 2002, exactly 28 years to the date of Exner's own consecration as bishop.

== Later life ==
After almost 13 years of serving as Archbishop of Vancouver, Exner reached the mandatory retirement age of 75 in December 2003. His resignation was accepted by Pope John Paul II less than one month later on January 10 of the following year. He subsequently remained in Vancouver, moving into the Oblate Provincial House, before returning to Saskatchewan shortly before his death. He revealed in court testimony that he suffered a stroke in 2015 that had "shattered [his] memory".

Exner died on September 5, 2023, at his home in Grayson, Saskatchewan. He was 94. His funeral was held fifteen days later on September 20 at St. Mary's Church in Grayson, where he received first Holy Communion and celebrated his first Mass after his priestly ordination.

== Measures ==
=== Maintaining Catholic institutions ===
Exner worked with other religious groups involved in healthcare in obtaining a legal agreement with Michael Harcourt, the Premier of British Columbia, in 1995. It ensures that healthcare establishments with a religious affiliation are able to continue adhering to their founding mission and values. Consequently, the Denominational Health Association was formed, sustaining the legacy of Exner's predecessor Carney. Exner also voiced his opposition to efforts by Colin Hansen, the provincial Minister of Health, to close St. Mary's Hospital in New Westminster. Although the medical institution eventually shut down in 2004, its foundation continued on, giving financial support to other local healthcare providers.

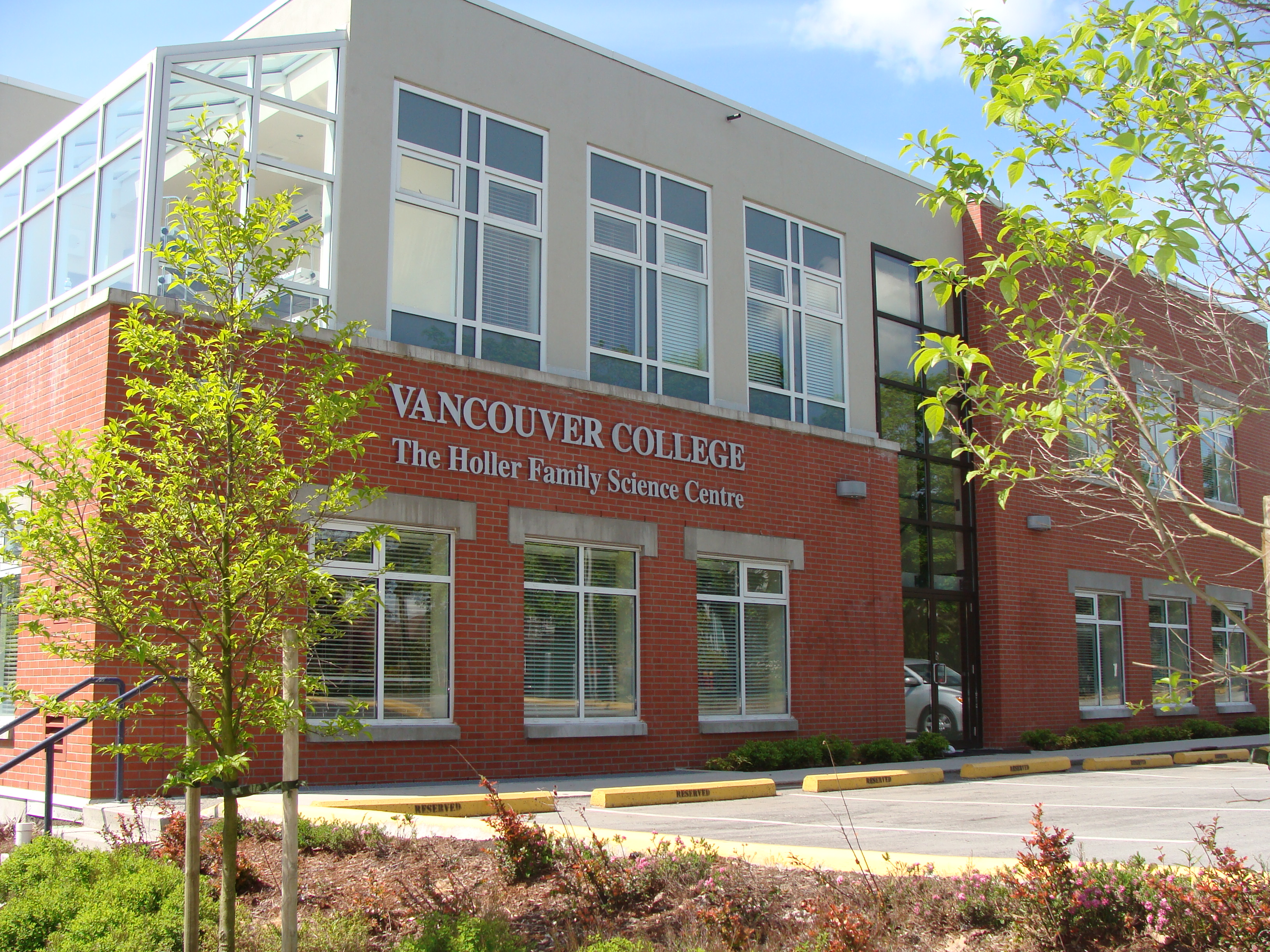
Vancouver College was one of two Catholic high schools in the Greater Vancouver area to be saved from liquidation in 2002.

Exner was closely involved with the efforts to prevent the closure of Vancouver College and St. Thomas More Collegiate at the turn of the millennium. These were operated by the Congregation of Christian Brothers and were the order's most valuable assets in Canada, estimated to be worth C$38–43 million. Consequently, the two high schools faced closure and liquidation in order to pay the victims of the Mount Cashel Orphanage sexual and physical abuse scandal. The issue was resolved when the Archdiocese of Vancouver paid $19 million to the liquidator of the order in July 2002, without the educational institutions having to be sold. The school boards were thereafter supervised by the archbishop and other Catholics in the Archdiocese. Exner was of the opinion that the court's judgment was unjustified, since the schools were not owned by the order and had been financed by local Catholics in the decades before the liquidation. He said that he had "no problem with the Mount Cashel claimants" being compensated. However, he felt that "in order to rectify one injustice, another injustice has been committed", adding that there was "a very strong prejudice against the Catholic Church in the judicial system, in the general public, and the media". Exner also assisted Covenant House, a home for runaway street kids, in establishing a branch of its services into Vancouver.

=== Handling of clergy sex abuse ===
"The veil is off. It's really, really off, no doubt about it. All the bishops I know, none of them is trying to hide anything any more. And we're quite ready to co-operate with the police and the judicial system."

— Archbishop Adam Exner, ten years after the publication of From Pain to Hope (May 2002)

Exner was one of seven members on the Canadian Conference of Catholic Bishops Ad Hoc Committee on Child Sexual Abuse, established in October 1989 to investigate sexual abuse perpetrated by priests and other male religious figures. It published a report in June 1992 titled From Pain to Hope. This was the first ever systemic study conducted by an episcopal conference that delved into stopping sexual abuse, looking after victims, and instituting administrative procedures to be employed in the event of sexual abuse by clergy. Although he admitted that he could not make any promises, Exner surmised that the report would result in "action right across the country". He added how "it is the bishops of Canada that asked for this study. It is the bishops of Canada that insistently showed interest in this and support for the work of this committee and I'm convinced that many of these if not all of these recommendations will in fact be implemented". A decade after the report was released, he observed how the culture of church coverups in Canada had come to an end.

== Views ==
=== Abortion and euthanasia ===
Exner was noted as a staunch opponent of the practice and legalization of abortion in Canada, standing at the forefront of many anti-abortion marches. In the run up to the 1984 federal election, Exner and the five other bishops in Manitoba issued a pastoral letter to the laity informing them that "one cannot support an election candidate who upholds a pro-abortion position". At the same time, he spoke out against anti-abortion violence, most notably after the murder of Barnett Slepian in October 1998. The editor of The B.C. Catholic wrote an editorial in the paper in the aftermath of the attack that was criticized for posing the rhetorical question, "How can anyone help but be pleased that murders of abortionists just might have some positive side effects". This eclipsed the conclusion that the killing of Slepian was wrong because "sin produces more sin". Exner noted that he had not read the editorial before it was published, and delivered a press release that unequivocally denounced the murder. He stated that it was "unfortunate that [the editor] worded it the way he did. But that doesn't mean to say the substance of the editorial is not correct. That particular paragraph is not well-worded. The church's position is crystal clear there is no justification, none, for killing abortion doctors".

Exner spoke before the Special Senate Committee on Euthanasia and Assisted Suicide in September 1994. He was strongly critical of the practice, stating how "we must certainly make every effort to kill the pain without, however, killing the patient". He added that euthanasia "poses as freedom [and] beckons us to be the masters over life and death. In other words, it promises us that we can be our own gods. As much as we may pretend to be gods, in the final analysis we are not in control of life or death".

=== Capital punishment ===
As chairman of the Catholic Organization for Life and Family, Exner wrote a letter in November 1998 to George W. Bush, the Governor of Texas at the time. This was intended to bolster the request by the Canadian government to spare the life of Stanley Faulder, a Canadian citizen on death row in Texas. Exner observed, "One cannot help noticing that Mr. Faulder's scheduled date of execution is on the 50th anniversary of the Universal Declaration of Human Rights, which includes the most fundamental right of all – the right to life". He added that the group's regard was founded on "the unswerving belief that human life and dignity must be respected and protected without exception". Faulder was eventually executed on June 17, 1999.

=== LGBT issues ===
The Catholic Civil Rights League sought and obtained intervenor status during litigation in the late 1990s involving Trinity Western University (TWU), in relation to its training policies. This was done at Exner's direction and with his backing. The case centred on a dispute between TWU, a Christian university that wanted to train public school teachers, and the British Columbia College of Teachers (BCCT). The BCCT had rejected TWU's application for certification because the university required its students to sign a community covenant pledging to abstain from all sexual intimacy outside of heterosexual marriage. The British Columbia Court of Appeal found in favour of TWU in 1998, and the Supreme Court of Canada affirmed that judgment three years later in Trinity Western University v British Columbia College of Teachers.

"[W]e preach against adultery. But that doesn't mean we are phobic about people who commit adultery. We also teach fornication is wrong. But that doesn't mean we reject or become phobic about young people who don't always abide by that teaching."

— Archbishop Adam Exner, refuting Tim Stevenson's aspersion that he is a "homophobic individual" (July 1998)

Exner was vocal in his opposition to the provincial government's plan in 1998 of expanding the pension benefits of public servants to encompass those with same-sex partners. He maintained that this would constitute a redefinition of marriage, which was unacceptable because "biologically, such couples are not equipped to be husband and wife". He instead proposed that these benefits be extended to anyone in a stable and caring relationship. Ujjal Dosanjh, the province's attorney general, was warm to Exner's idea but cautioned that it would be "highly expensive" and potentially "open to abuse". Tim Stevenson, a United Church of Canada minister and the first openly gay member of the Legislative Assembly of British Columbia, lambasted Exner as "a homophobic individual". Brian Thorpe, the United Church's provincial executive secretary who is also gay, attempted to strike a more conciliatory tone by noting how "Catholic teaching is rigorously logical" and is "able to separate doctrine from its emotional content in such a way that I think it's quite possible for a Roman Catholic to express doctrine and not have personally negative feelings to homosexual people". Exner defended himself when informed of Stevenson's swipe, commenting: "Let me assure you I have consistently taught respect for every person, regardless of whether they're homosexual or not".

"We will continue to teach in word and action what the church teaches. Disagree if you will, but recognize a principled stand for what it is."

— Archbishop Adam Exner, in a letter to the Vancouver Sun explaining the decision to end cooperation with Vancity (October 1, 2003)

Exner instructed four Catholic schools in the Greater Vancouver area to divest from a school banking program operated by Vancity in September 2003. This was ostensibly in response to the credit union releasing an advertisement showing two men sitting with their cheeks touching with the caption, "I want to bank with people who value all partnerships". However, in a letter to the Vancouver Sun explaining the reasoning behind the decision, Exner wrote that it boiled down to Vancity's "support for causes opposed to Catholic morals [that] went far beyond ads featuring same-sex couples". He stated that the credit union was participating in an "objectionable cause" in their public support for "agendas which are worrisome and harmful to the church and to society". The decision led to public outcry, with one message sent to the Archdiocese linking Exner (who is of German descent) to Nazism. At one point, protesters gathered outside Exner's residence late at night, shouting obscenities and making threats against him. This prompted the Vancouver Police Department to investigate the threats and recommend that he take measures to protect his personal security while out in public.

== Honours ==
- Holy See: Order of the Holy Sepulchre (October 1, 1996)

In addition to being made Knight Grand Cross of the Order of the Holy Sepulchre, Exner was also named the inaugural Grand Prior of the Order's Lieutenancy of Canada–Vancouver. This encompasses British Columbia, Alberta, as well as the territory of Yukon.

On the occasion of Exner's retirement as Archbishop of Vancouver in 2004, the Catholic Civil Rights League created the Archbishop Adam Exner Award for Catholic Excellence in Public Life in his honour. It is presented annually to give recognition to "outstanding achievement in advocacy, education, life issues, media and culture, and philanthropy".

== Notes ==
Catholic Church titles
| Preceded by Michael Harrington | Bishop of Kamloops; 1974–1982 | Succeeded by Lawrence Sabatini |
| Preceded by George Flahiff | Archbishop of Winnipeg; 1982–1991 | Succeeded by Leonard James Wall |
| Preceded by James Carney | Archbishop of Vancouver; 1991–2004 | Succeeded by Raymond Roussin |
