= Bishop of Vancouver =

Bishop of Vancouver may refer to:

- the Anglican bishop of the Diocese of New Westminster (the see is located in Vancouver)
- the Roman Catholic archbishop of the Archdiocese of Vancouver
