= J. Michael Miller =

Catholic archbishop (born 1946)

His Grace, The Most Reverend J. Michael Miller CSB
- Archbishop Emeritus of Vancouver
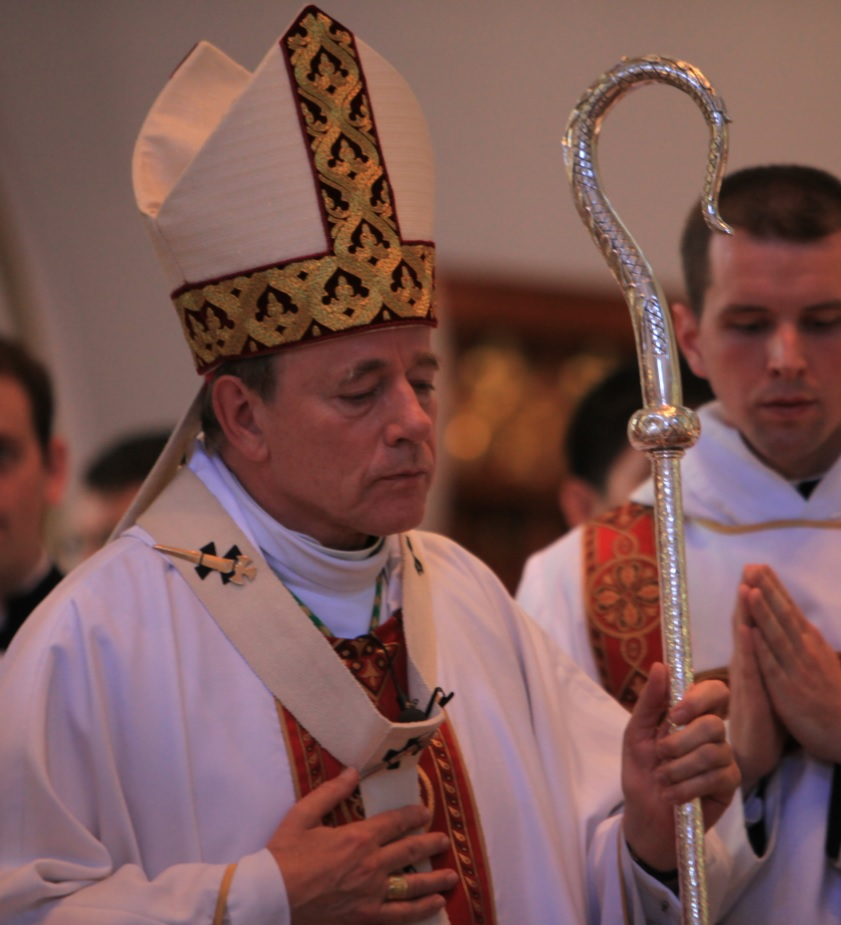
- Miller in 2012
- See: Vancouver
- Installed: January 2, 2009
- Term ended: February 25, 2025
- Predecessor: Raymond Roussin
- Successor: Richard W. Smith
- Previous posts: Secretary of the Congregation for Catholic Education (2003‍–‍2007); Titular Archbishop of Vertara (2003‍–‍2007); Coadjutor Archbishop of Vancouver (2007‍–‍2009)

Orders
- Ordination: June 29, 1975 by Pope Paul VI
- Consecration: January 12, 2004 by Zenon Grocholewski

Personal details
- Born: John Michael Miller; July 9, 1946 (age 80) Ottawa, Ontario, Canada
- Denomination: Roman Catholic
- Education: St. Michael's College, Toronto (BA, MDiv); University of Wisconsin–Madison (MA); Pontifical Gregorian University (STL, STD)
- Motto: Veritati servire (Latin for 'To serve the truth')
- Coat of arms: J. Michael Miller's coat of arms

Ordination history
History
Priestly ordination
- Ordained by: Pope Paul VI
- Date: June 29, 1975
- Place: St. Peter's Square, Vatican City
Episcopal consecration
- Principal consecrator: Zenon Grocholewski (Pref. Cong. de Inst. Cath.)
- Co-consecrators: Joseph Fiorenza (Galveston–Houston); Ronald Peter Fabbro (London)
- Date: January 12, 2004
- Place: St. Peter's Basilica, Vatican City
Episcopal succession
Bishops consecrated by J. Michael Miller as principal consecrator
- Stephen Jensen: April 2, 2013
- Joseph Phuong Nguyen: August 25, 2016

Styles of J. Michael Miller
- Reference style: His Grace; The Most Reverend
- Spoken style: Your Grace; Your Excellency
- Religious style: Archbishop

John Michael Miller, CSB (born July 9, 1946) is a Canadian retired bishop of the Catholic Church. He is the Archbishop Emeritus of Vancouver, having served as its ordinary from 2009 until 2025. He previously served as the coadjutor archbishop of Vancouver and as Secretary of the Congregation for Catholic Education. Prior to his appointment as bishop, he was a professor and academic administrator at the University of St. Thomas (UST) in Houston.

Miller was born and raised in Ottawa, where he completed his secondary education. He entered the Basilian novitiate after his first year of studies at St. Michael's College in Toronto. He was ordained a priest in 1975. He completed a licentiate and doctoral degree in dogmatic theology and went on to teach at UST. After a five-year stint in Rome working at the Secretariat of State, he returned to UST and became its president in 1997. He was appointed Secretary of the Congregation for Catholic Education in 2002 and was consecrated the following year. He was named coadjutor archbishop of the Archdiocese of Vancouver in 2007, before assuming the office of archbishop two years later. Miller has been noted for overseeing the construction of the archdiocese's new administrative headquarters and starting its permanent diaconate program. He also appointed the committee that examined historical sex abuse by clergy in the archdiocese and published its findings in a report, purportedly the first in Canada.

== Early life ==
Miller was born in Ottawa, Ontario, on July 9, 1946. He was raised in an interdenominational household. His father, Albert Miller, was a Catholic who first worked for the Royal Canadian Mounted Police and later as a salesman; his mother, Katharine Rob, was a descendant of Scottish Loyalists and was a lifelong member of the United Church of Canada. Miller attended St. Joseph's High School in his hometown, where he was chosen as student body president and was classmates with Mary Lou Finlay. He had polio as a child, and the effects of the illness have persisted into adulthood. He consequently opted for non-contact sports and activities like debating, swimming, and school drama productions. One of these productions was Our Town, in which he played George opposite Finlay as Emily.

Miller went on to study at St. Michael's College in the University of Toronto. At the end of his first year of studies, he joined the Congregation of St. Basil, completing his noviceship and taking his first vows on September 12, 1966. He went back to St. Michael's as a seminarian, obtained a bachelor's degree from the University of Toronto in 1969, and was awarded the Governor General's Academic Medal for graduating first in his class. He undertook postgraduate studies at the University of Wisconsin, receiving a master's degree in Latin American studies in 1970. He then taught at St. Joseph's High School (his alma mater) for one year, before earning a Master of Divinity from St. Michael's in 1974. On June 29, 1975, Miller was ordained to the Catholic priesthood at St. Peter's Square by Pope Paul VI, and was one of 359 men ordained by the Pope in the same ceremony.

== Presbyteral ministry ==
After his ordination, Miller continued his studies at the Pontifical Gregorian University in Rome, obtaining a licentiate in dogmatic theology in 1976 before being awarded a doctorate three years later (graduating summa cum laude in both instances). He then relocated to Houston, where he taught as a professor of dogmatic theology at the University of St. Thomas (UST). He later became the department chair and dean of its School of Theology, before being promoted to vice president of academic affairs in 1990. He moved back to Rome in 1992 to work as an assistant in the English-language division of the Secretariat of State. He also taught at the Pontifical Gregorian University as an adjunct professor of theology from 1994 to 1996.

Miller returned to UST in 1997, becoming its seventh president on July 1 that year. During his tenure, he initiated a $65 million capital campaign, which was twice the amount of any previous fundraising goal set by the university. The drive raised $67 million and received generous contributions from local non-Catholic philanthropists such as George P. Mitchell and Jack S. Blanton. He appointed Sandra Magie as dean of UST's School of Theology in April 2003, making her one of only a handful of women to lead such a school at a Catholic institution. Miller became a naturalized American citizen in 2002. He served as president up until his appointment as bishop, and was succeeded on an interim basis by Joseph McFadden, his immediate predecessor.

== Episcopal ministry ==
=== Congregation for Catholic Education (2003–2007) ===
Miller was appointed as the secretary of the Congregation for Catholic Education on November 23, 2003, as well as vice president of the Pontifical Work of Priestly Vocations. He was consequently assigned the titular see of Vertara with the rank of archbishop. He was consecrated bishop on January 12, 2004, at the Altar of the Chair in St. Peter's Basilica. Zenon Grocholewski, the prefect of the aforementioned congregation, serving as the principal consecrator, with nearly 400 of Miller's friends and family travelling to Rome to be in attendance. During a special audience held the day after his episcopal ordination, Pope John Paul II characterized Miller's episcopal motto, Veritati Servire ("To Serve the Truth"), as "an eloquent summary of the commitment that has marked his priestly life".

During his term of office, Miller drafted and co-signed a document titled "Instruction Concerning the Criteria for the Discernment of Vocations with Regard to Persons with Homosexual Tendencies in View of Their Admission to the Seminary and to Holy Orders". Published on November 4, 2005, it affirmed that "the Church, while profoundly respecting the persons in question, cannot admit to the seminary or to holy orders those who practise homosexuality, present deep-seated homosexual tendencies or support the so-called 'gay culture'". While the accompanying letter stressed that the directive "does not call into question the validity of the ordination" of men with "homosexual tendencies" who are priests, it did call for them "not to be appointed as rectors or educators in seminaries". However, Miller was reportedly "very uncomfortable" with the extreme reading of the instruction by Tony Anatrella – who contended that gay men should be excluded from the priesthood altogether – on account of it "lacking balance".

=== Vancouver (2007–2025) ===
Miller was appointed coadjutor archbishop of the Archdiocese of Vancouver on June 1, 2007. This was intended to help Raymond Roussin, the ordinary of the archdiocese at the time, who had depression in the preceding years. Miller, who was transferred before the expiration of his five-year term as secretary, underscored that the move "wasn't in any way engineered by me". He succeeded Roussin as Archbishop of Vancouver on January 2, 2009, after the latter's resignation was accepted by Pope Benedict XVI five years before the mandatory retirement age of 75.

Miller established the permanent diaconate in the archdiocese in 2011, with the first candidates of the program ordained four years later. He acted as principal consecrator at the episcopal ordination of Stephen Jensen, held in Prince George, British Columbia, on April 2, 2013. He also oversaw the construction of the new administrative headquarters of the Archdiocese of Vancouver, which opened in early 2015. Miller served as the principal consecrator at the episcopal ordination of Joseph Phuong Nguyen at the Sandman Centre in Kamloops on August 25, 2016.

After more than 12 years of serving as Archbishop of Vancouver, Miller reached the mandatory retirement age of 75 in July 2021. Although his resignation was duly received by Pope Francis, Miller was asked to remain in the position for another three years, a request to which he acceded. In April of the following year, he was one of over 80 Catholic bishops to sign a "fraternal open letter" to the German Bishops' Conference, expressing concern over the Synodal Path process being undertaken in Germany at the time.

== Later life ==
Miller's resignation was ultimately accepted by Pope Francis on February 25, 2025, and he was succeeded by Richard W. Smith. During his final Archbishop’s Dinner address three months earlier, Miller expressed his intention to retire back to Houston. In one of his final public acts as ordinary, he presided over a memorial mass at Holy Rosary Cathedral on May 2, 2025, for victims of the Vancouver car attack one week earlier. It was attended by Premier David Eby, Mayor Ken Sim, and interim chief constable of the Vancouver Police Department Steve Rai.

== Measures ==
=== Handling of clergy sex abuse ===
Miller formed a committee in 2018 to investigate cases of sexual abuse by clergy in the Archdiocese of Vancouver going back to the 1950s. Its thirteen members consisted of clergy and laity, including four victim-survivors of clergy abuse. The committee published its report of its findings in November of the following year, determining that there were 36 such cases – of which 26 involved children – and five priests convicted on criminal charges. According to The Fifth Estate, this marked the first time that a Latin Church diocese in Canada had publicized information about convicted priests. The official newspaper of the archdiocese, The B.C. Catholic, billed it as "the first report of its kind released by any diocese in Canada". In a letter announcing the report, Miller apologized for the past failings of the church, writing:

"I realize that no expression of regret can repair the horror of what happened. For those occasions when we failed to protect you or when we were more concerned with the Church's reputation than with your suffering, I am truly sorry and ask for your forgiveness as I strive to make amends and bind your wounds."

== Views ==
=== Environmental positions ===
The Archdiocese of Vancouver sought and received a Leadership in Energy and Environmental Design (LEED) Gold Certification for its new administrative headquarters. Miller recounted that this was done "in order to be as environmentally responsible as we could and practice good stewardship in how we use our resources". He later hosted a climate change symposium at the aforementioned headquarters in October 2015 to highlight Laudato si', the encyclical published by Pope Francis earlier that year. It saw the participation of Gregor Robertson, the mayor of Vancouver at the time, as well as other faith leaders and members of charity groups. Miller remarked how "we have a common desire and intention to address the harm we have inflicted on the Earth. We have abused the gifts of God". He added that it was "painfully clear that humans are not meant to have 'dominion' over nature, but to recognize they are 'inter-related' with the Earth".

=== LGBT issues ===
When asked about his opinion of homosexual relationships during a 2014 interview with the Vancouver Sun, Miller stated that the faithful can follow the approach of Pope Francis regarding the matter. He underlined how the church's teaching is "very clear that homosexual persons are always to be respected and accorded the dignity due to everyone. We are all created in God's image and likeness."

=== Religious liberty ===
Miller supported Trinity Western University (TWU) in its efforts to establish a law school, stating that "to attempt to bar faith from the development of those who would practise the law is to undermine the foundations of conscience and integrity that in fact contributed to the modern Western legal system". He conveyed his discontent after the Supreme Court of Canada held in June 2018 that it was "proportionate and reasonable" to restrict the religious rights of TWU because of its admission policies. The law societies of British Columbia and Ontario had refused accreditation to TWU's proposed law school, because its students were obliged to sign a community covenant promising to abstain from all sexual intimacy outside of heterosexual marriage. Miller noted that the court had "undermined rights actually written in the Charter in favour of unwritten charter values", observing how the freedom of conscience and religion "is the first freedom guaranteed in the Charter".

== Honours ==
- Holy See: Order of the Holy Sepulchre

In addition to being a member of the Order of the Holy Sepulchre, Miller is also the grand prior of the order's Lieutenancy of Canada–Vancouver. This encompasses British Columbia, Alberta, as well as the territory of Yukon. He was awarded the Canadian King Charles III Coronation Medal.

Miller received an honorary degree from the Franciscan University of Steubenville in 2005. He was granted an honorary Doctor of Laws by the University of Dallas on May 14, 2006, and delivered the commencement address at that ceremony. He was conferred an honorary doctorate by the Australian Catholic University on August 1, 2007. Miller was also awarded honorary degrees from UST and Saint Michael's College in Vermont.

== Published books ==
- Miller, J. Michael (1983). What are They Saying about Papal Primacy?. Paulist Press. ISBN 9780809125012.
- ——————— (1995). The Shepherd and the Rock: Origins, Development, and Mission of the Papacy. Our Sunday Visitor. ISBN 9780879737351.
- ——————— (2001). The Encyclicals of John Paul II. Our Sunday Visitor. ISBN 9780879733162.
- ——————— (2006). The Holy See's Teaching on Catholic Schools. Sophia Institute Press. ISBN 9781933184203.

Catholic Church titles
Preceded by Giuseppe Pittau	Secretary of the Congregation for Catholic Education; 2003–2007	Succeeded by Jean-Louis Bruguès
Vacant Title last held by Martin Michael Johnson	Coadjutor Archbishop of Vancouver; 2007–2009	Vacant
Preceded by Raymond Roussin	Archbishop of Vancouver; 2009–2025	Succeeded by Richard W. Smith
Preceded by Julián Herranz Casado	— TITULAR — Archbishop of Vertara; 2003–2007	Succeeded by Cástor Oswaldo Azuaje Pérez
