= Martin Michael Johnson =

Canadian bishop

Most Rev. Martin Michael Johnson
- Archbishop of Vancouver
- Province: British Columbia
- Diocese: Archdiocese of Vancouver
- Installed: 1964
- Term ended: 1969
- Predecessor: William Mark Duke
- Successor: James Carney
- Previous posts: Bishop of Nelson (1936–1954); Coadjutor Archbishop of Vancouver (1954–1964); Titular Archbishop of Cius (1954–1964); Titular Archbishop of Civitate (1969–1970)

Orders
- Ordination: 1924 - Priest
- Consecration: 1936 - Bishop

Personal details
- Born: Martin Michael Johnson; March 18, 1899 Toronto, Ontario, Canada
- Died: January 29, 1975 (aged 75) Vancouver, British Columbia, Canada
- Denomination: Roman Catholic

Martin Michael Johnson (March 18, 1899 – January 29, 1975) was the Bishop of Nelson, British Columbia, Canada for 18 years. He then became Archbishop of the Archdiocese of Vancouver, British Columbia, Canada from 1964 to 1969.

== Curriculum Vitae ==
Martin Johnson was born on March 18, 1899, in Toronto, Ontario, Canada.

=== Ordination ===
In 1924, Martin Johnson became a priest, in the Diocese of Nelson, British Columbia, Canada.

=== Consecration ===
In 1936, Martin Johnson became consecrated as bishop and became Bishop of Nelson. In 1954 he became Coadjutor Archbishop of Vancouver and then was appointed as Archbishop of Vancouver in 1964 and retired in 1969.

Martin Johnson died on January 29, 1975, as Archbishop Emeritus of Vancouver.

== Legacy ==
- He helped the Christian Brothers of Ireland, establish the high school of St. Thomas More Collegiate, which provided Catholic education in the cities of Burnaby & New Westminster.

== Service to God ==
- Priest for 51 years
- Bishop for 38 years

== Notes ==
Johnson is noted for being a great organizer & fundraiser. He centralized Catholic services and restructured Catholic education.

He was also the first Bishop of the new Diocese of Nelson, British Columbia.

Religious titles
New diocese	Bishop of Nelson; 1936–1954	Succeeded by Thomas Joseph McCarthy
Vacant Title last held by William Mark Duke	Coadjutor Archbishop of Vancouver; 1954–1964	Vacant Title next held by J. Michael Miller
Preceded by William Mark Duke	Archbishop of Vancouver; 1964–1969	Succeeded by James Carney
Preceded by William Godfrey	— TITULAR — Archbishop of Cius; 1954–1964	Vacant
Diocese restored as a titular see	— TITULAR — Archbishop of Civitate; 1969–1970	Succeeded by Juan Alfredo Arzube
