= Timothy Casey =

Canadian archbishop

The Most Reverend Timothy Casey
- Archbishop of Vancouver
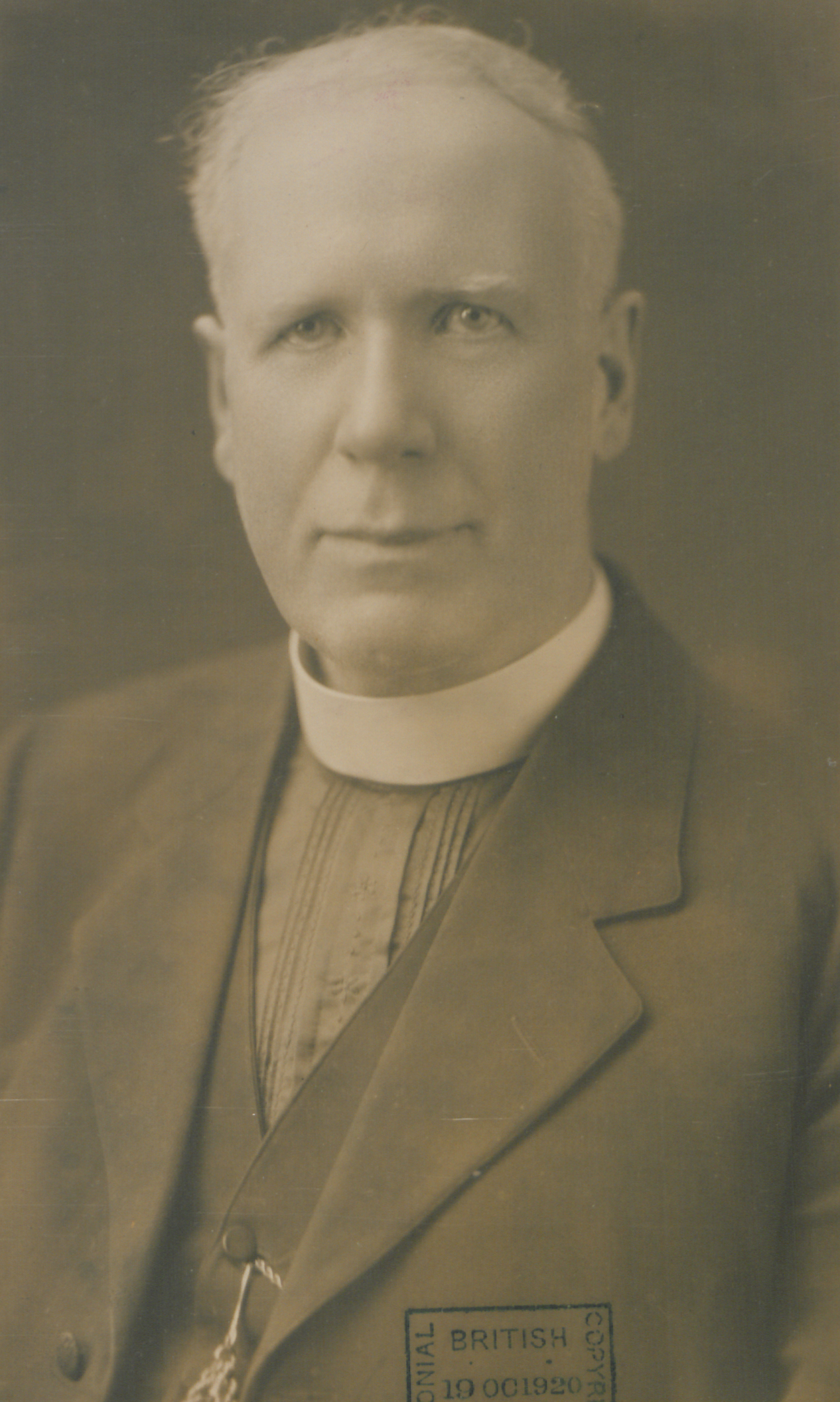
- Archdiocese: Vancouver
- Installed: 1912
- Term ended: 1931
- Predecessor: Neil McNeil
- Successor: William Mark Duke

Orders
- Ordination: 1886 (priest)
- Consecration: 1900

Personal details
- Born: Timothy Casey; February 20, 1862 Flume Ridge, New Brunswick
- Died: October 6, 1931 (aged 69) Vancouver, British Columbia, Canada
- Denomination: Roman Catholic
- Motto: Dominus Spes Mea

Timothy Casey (February 20, 1862 – October 6, 1931) was the Roman Catholic Archbishop of Vancouver, Canada, from 1912 to 1931.

== Curriculum vitae ==
Timothy Casey was born on February 20, 1862, in Flume Ridge, New Brunswick.

=== Ordination ===
In 1885, Timothy Casey became a priest of Saint John in America, New Brunswick, Canada.

=== Consecration ===
In 1900, Timothy Casey became consecrated as Bishop of Saint John in America and then was appointed as Archbishop of Vancouver in 1912.

Timothy Casey died on October 6, 1931.

== Legacy ==
- Changed Holy Rosary church to Holy Rosary Cathedral (Vancouver).

== Notes ==
Casey is noted for holding together the Catholic Archdiocese of Vancouver through hard financial times of pre & post World War I.

Catholic Church titles
Preceded by John Sweeny	Bishop of Saint John of America; 1900–1912	Succeeded by Edward Alfred LeBlanc
Preceded by Neil McNeil	Archbishop of Vancouver; 1912–1931	Succeeded by William Mark Duke
