= Michael Harrington (bishop) =

Roman-catholic bishop

Michael Alphonsus Harrington
- Bishop of Kamloops
- Church: Catholic Church
- Diocese: Diocese of Kamloops
- In office: 27 August 1952 – 1 August 1973
- Predecessor: Edward Quentin Jennings
- Successor: Adam Exner

Orders
- Ordination: 29 May 1926 by Patrick Thomas Ryan
- Consecration: 20 November 1952 by James McGuigan

Personal details
- Born: 15 September 1900 Killaloe, Ontario, Dominion of Canada, British Empire
- Died: 1 August 1973 (aged 72)

Michael Alphonsus Harrington (15 September 1900 – 1 August 1973) was a Canadian clergyman and bishop for the Roman Catholic Diocese of Kamloops. Harrington was born in Killaloe, Ontario. He became ordained in 1926. He was appointed bishop in 1952. He died on 1 August 1973, at the age of 72.
