= Catholic Organization for Life and Family =

The Catholic Organization for Life and Family (COLF) was co-founded by the Canadian Conference of Catholic Bishops (CCCB) and the Supreme Council of the Knights of Columbus. Its "mission is to build a culture of life and a civilization of love by promoting respect for human life and dignity and the essential role of the family." It ended operations in 2020.
