= Diocese of Kamloops =

Catholic ecclesiastical territory

Diocese of Kamloops Dioecesis Kamloopsensis
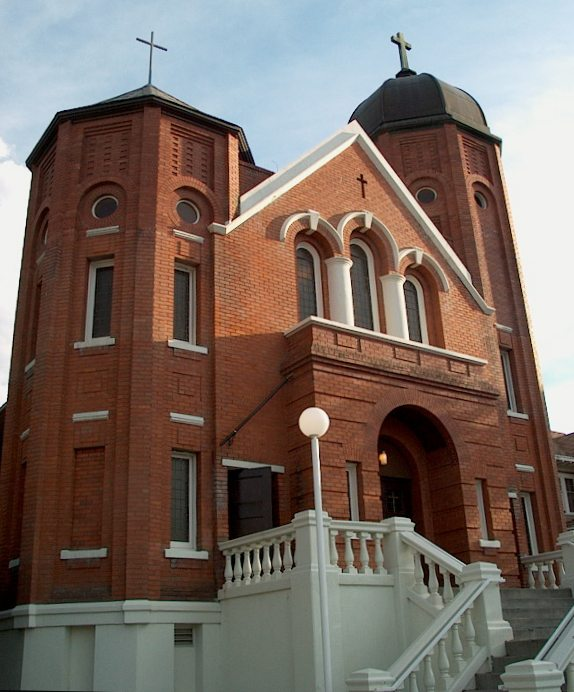
- Sacred Heart Cathedral

Location
- Country: Canada
- Territory: Central British Columbia
- Ecclesiastical province: Vancouver

Statistics
- Area: 119,000 km^{2} (46,000 sq mi)
- Population: (as of 2006); 51,900 (12.9%)

Information
- Denomination: Roman Catholic
- Rite: Roman Rite
- Established: December 22, 1945
- Cathedral: Sacred Heart Cathedral (Kamloops)
- Patron saint: Immaculate Heart of Mary (principal); St. John Vianney (secondary)

Current leadership
- Pope: Leo XIV
- Bishop: Joseph Phuong Nguyen
- Metropolitan Archbishop: Richard W. Smith
- Bishops emeritus: David Monroe; Lawrence Sabatini, C.S.

Website
- http://www.rcdk.org/

The Roman Catholic Diocese of Kamloops (Latin: Dioecesis Kamloopsensis) (erected 22 December 1945) is a suffragan of the Archdiocese of Vancouver. The Diocese of Kamloops is led by Bishop Joseph Phuong Nguyen.

== Diocesan demographics ==
The Diocese of Kamloops has a Catholic population of 51,900 (2006) served by 14 diocesan priests, 8 religious priests, 1 permanent deacon and 26 religious sisters and brothers in 25 parishes.

== Ordinaries ==
- Edward Quentin Jennings (1946–1952), appointed Bishop of Fort William, Ontario
- Michael Alphonsus Harrington (1952–1973)
- Adam Exner (1974–1982), appointed Archbishop of Winnipeg, Manitoba
- Lawrence Sabatini, C.S. (1982–1999) – Bishop Emeritus
- David Monroe (2002–2016) – Bishop Emeritus
- Joseph Phuong Nguyen (2016–present)

== Education ==
=== Catholic high schools ===
St. Ann's Academy remained a high school until 1970. Unable to keep up with the changing demands of B.C.'s curriculum, it reverted to an elementary school. In 1980, Bishop Adam Exner asked the Congregation of Christian Brothers to open the high school section and in September 1981, St. Ann's Academy became a high school again.

School	City	Est.	Website	Enrollment
St. Ann's Academy (high school re-established 1981)	Kamloops	1910	http://www.st-anns.ca/	~600 (co-ed)

== Religious institutes ==
=== Men ===
- Congregation of Christian Brothers (CFC)
- Missionary Oblates of Mary Immaculate (OMI)

=== Women ===
- Congregation of Notre Dame (CND)
- Discalced Carmelites (OCD)
- Missionary Sisters of Christ the King (MCR)
- Sisters of Mission Service (SMS)
- Franciscan Sisters of the Immaculate Conception (SFIC)

== Sex abuse lawsuit ==
On August 25, 2020, British Columbia justice David Crossin ordered the office of the Bishop of Kamloops and former priest Erlindo Molon, who was by then 88 years old, to pay $844,140 in damages to Rosemary Anderson, who claimed Molon raped her 75 to 100 times since 1976, when she was 26 years old. During the lawsuit, former Kamloops Bishop Adam Exner, who would eventually be appointed Archbishop of Vancouver, said during witness testimony that he knew Molon “was molesting people,” including Anderson. Exner also stated that Molon was not stripped of his priesthood status until after Anderson told him that Molon raped her and asked her to marry him.

== Publications ==
- Kamloops Wawa, a one-time publication of the diocese
- Diocesan News, bi-monthly newspaper started in 1976 as the Diocesan Update. Name changed to the Diocesan News in 1990.
