= Holy Rosary Cathedral (Vancouver) =

Catholic cathedral in Vancouver, Canada

- The Cathedral of Our Lady of the Holy Rosary
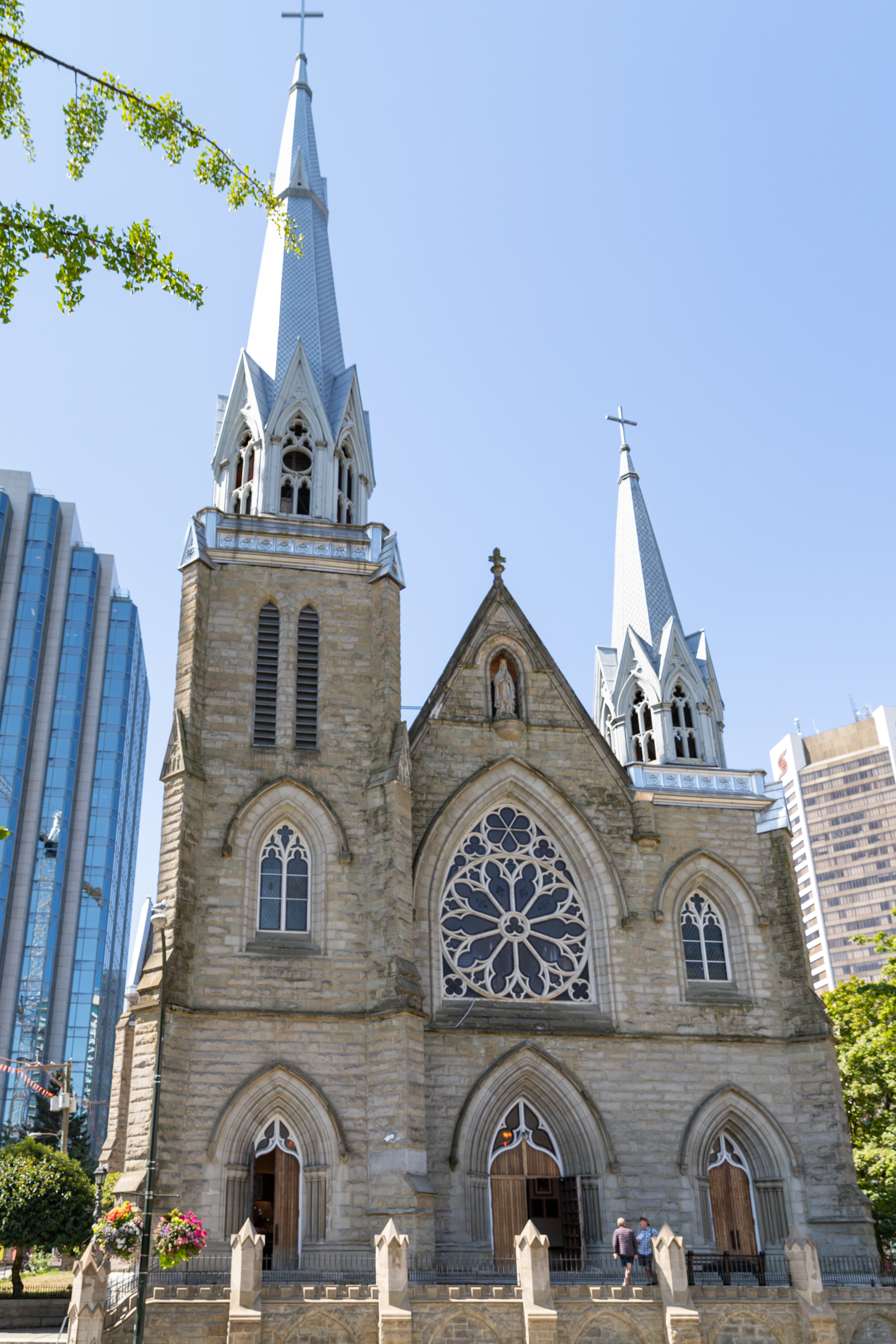
- Holy Rosary Cathedral
- 49°16′55″N 123°6′53″W
- Location: 646 Richards Street, Vancouver (Note: The front entrance of the church faces Dunsmuir Street.)
- Country: Canada
- Denomination: Catholic Church
- Sui iuris church: Latin Church

History
- Status: Cathedral
- Consecrated: October 3, 1953

Architecture
- Functional status: Active
- Architect(s): Julian and Williams
- Style: French Gothic
- Groundbreaking: July 16, 1899
- Completed: December 8, 1900

Specifications
- Capacity: 700

Administration
- Archdiocese: Archdiocese of Vancouver

Clergy
- Archbishop: Richard W. Smith
- Rector: Stanley Galvon

The Cathedral of Our Lady of the Holy Rosary, commonly known as Holy Rosary Cathedral, is a late 19th-century Catholic French Gothic revival church that serves as the cathedral of the Archdiocese of Vancouver. It is located in the downtown area of the city at the intersection of Richards and Dunsmuir streets.

The construction of the cathedral began in 1899 on the site of an earlier church by the same name. It opened on the Feast of the Immaculate Conception on December 8, 1900, was blessed the day after, and was consecrated in 1953. The style has been described as resembling the medieval Chartres Cathedral in France. The church was elevated to the status of cathedral in 1916. It is listed on the Vancouver Heritage Register and is a legally protected building.

== History ==
=== Original structure (1887–1899) ===
The parish was established in June 1885 and Father Patrick Fay, the chaplain to Canadian Pacific Railway (CPR) workers, was chosen as pastor. He officiated the first mass of the parish on the feast of Our Lady of the Rosary in the same year at an unknown location. Although masses were held in Blair's Hall and Keefer's Hall, it became apparent that a new and permanent church was necessary to cope with the growing number of parishioners, which consisted of 69 families.

"We choose the section surrounding the base of that tree."

— Father Patrick Fay's alleged words in selecting the site where the cathedral currently stands

In order to pick a site for the new church, legend has it that Father Fay went to the Coal Harbour waterfront, looked south towards the forested land (present-day Downtown Vancouver) and chose the area that contained the tallest tree. Construction began in 1886 and the wooden church was completed and blessed in the following year. Two years later, the church was enlarged and a bell tower was added.

=== Present-day cathedral ===
With the rapid growth of Vancouver at the time, plans were made for a greater expansion of the church. Because Fay was transferred in 1892 and died shortly after, Father Eumellin succeeded him in overseeing the plan for construction from 1893 to 1897. Then, the new pastor of the church, Father James McGuckin, took over the project. By that time, the number of parishioners had outgrown the size of the church building. In order to fund the construction of the new church, the Missionary Oblates of Mary Immaculate (OMI) – the religious order McGuckin belonged to – mortgaged their headquarters in France, and before his death, Fay worked as a CPR foreman for a construction crew. Initially, parishioners and the OMI were skeptical of the project; the parish was already heavily in debt when McGuckin became pastor, the Catholic community in Vancouver – though rapidly growing – was still relatively small in number, and a friend of McGuckin who was a contractor was unable to provide the funds he had initially pledged. These problems culminated in the construction project being labelled "McGuckin's Folly".

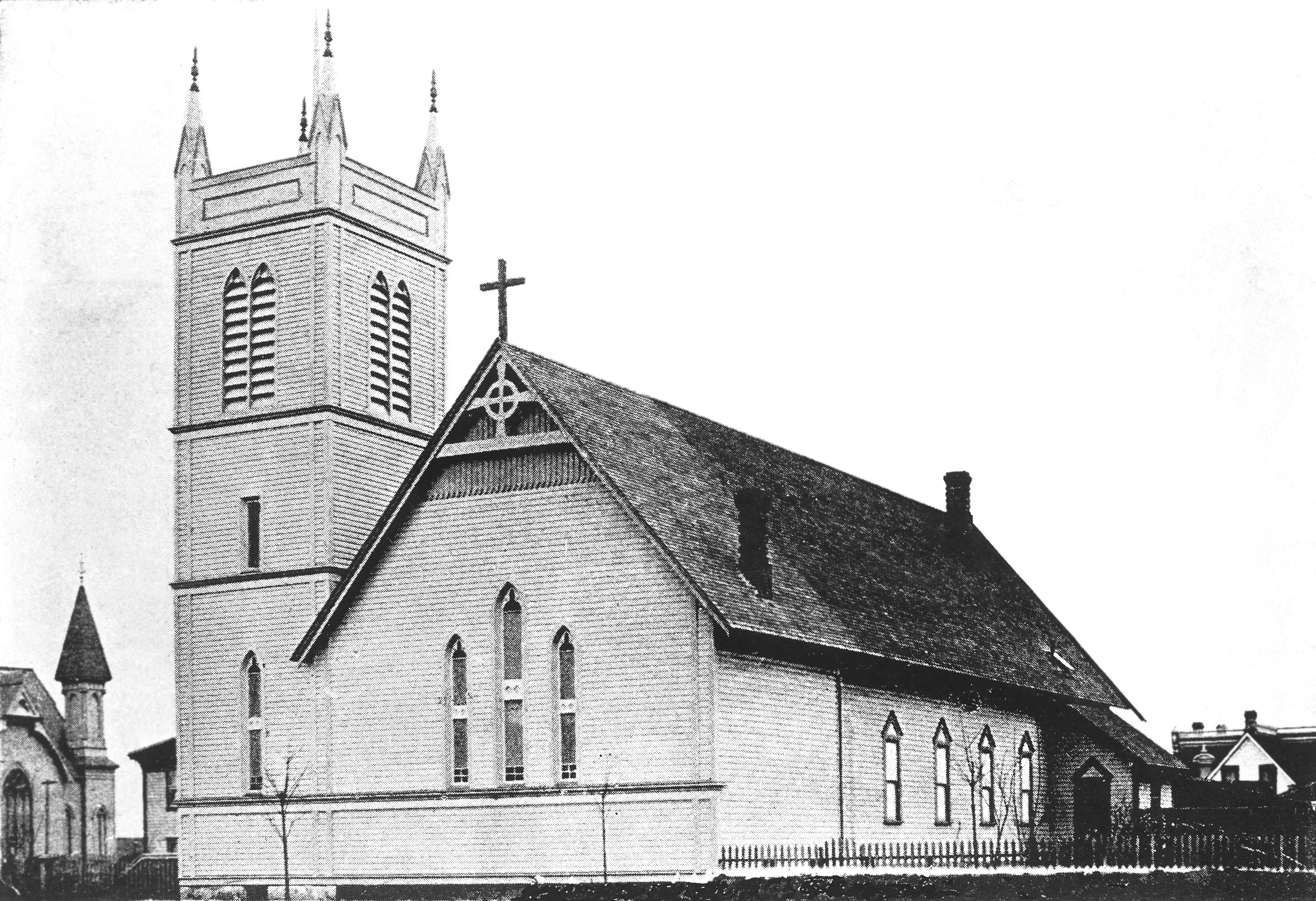
The original church circa 1889, featuring the newly built bell tower

Despite these doubts, the cornerstone of the new church was laid on July 16, 1899, by Archbishop Adélard Langevin of Saint Boniface. Thomas Ennor Julian and H.J. Williams were hired to be the architects, and in just 491 days, the construction was completed. At the time it was finished, the building was praised as "the finest piece of architecture west of Toronto and north of San Francisco." The new Church of Our Lady of the Holy Rosary opened on December 8, 1900 – the Feast of the Immaculate Conception – and was blessed one day later by Archbishop Alexander Christie of Portland, Oregon. By the end of the decade, it became "the most financially important parish" in the archdiocese, since it was the only church that not only could break-even, but could also churn out a surplus. Because of this, Archbishop Timothy Casey wanted to make the church the cathedral for the metropolitan see. The OMI were extremely reluctant to give up their church, and even attempted to give Casey money so that he could buy land elsewhere to build a new cathedral. Nonetheless, the church was elevated to the status of cathedral in 1916, but the Oblates were permitted to remain. The OMI – which administered the parish since 1893 – eventually left in 1927 after difficulties arose from the mortgage agreement that had helped pay for the construction of the cathedral. This was coupled with the "growing manpower shortage" caused by a declining number of members joining the order.

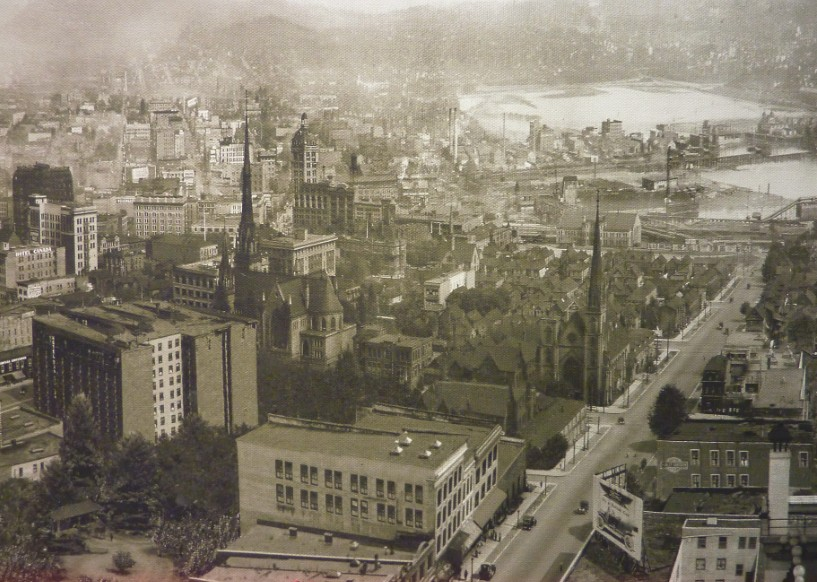
The cathedral in 1915 on the left

Since a Catholic church can only be consecrated once it has become free from debt, the cathedral did not have its rite of consecration held until October 3, 1953, fifty-three years after it first opened. The ceremony – which commenced just after daybreak – was officiated by the Archbishop of Vancouver, William M. Duke, with the subsequent solemn pontifical Mass celebrated by Bishop Michael Harrington of Kamloops. Approximately thirty-five bishops from across Canada and the United States attended the event, which coincided with Duke's golden and silver jubilees of his priestly ordination and consecration as a bishop, respectively.

On October 7, 1952, the feast day of the cathedral's namesake, a gunman entered the church and fired a round from his rifle at the altar. No one was hurt and he was arrested shortly after. A minor tilt in the bell tower of the cathedral was detected in April 1959, probably due to the drilling and blasting of a nearby tunnel.

"[The] seats were so full people [were crushing] each other, and the aisles were full of people standing; as close as they could get together. No church in Vancouver was ever so closely packed with people. Not an inch of room was empty."

— An account of Joe Fortes' funeral in Early Vancouver: Narratives of Pioneers of Vancouver, BC by Major J. S. Matthews, the city's first archivist

Many significant events have taken place at the cathedral. In 1936, it hosted an archdiocesan-level Eucharistic Congress, the first congress ever to be celebrated in Western Canada. Forty-eight years later, in September 1984, Pope John Paul II visited the church as part of his pastoral visit to Canada. In late September 2001, the cathedral became the first place in Canada to host the relics of Saint Thérèse of Lisieux during her reliquary's three-month-long tour of the country. A memorial mass for victims of the 2025 Vancouver car attack was held on May 2, 2025, which was declared a day of remembrance and mourning by the government of British Columbia. It was attended by Premier David Eby, Mayor Ken Sim, and interim chief constable of the Vancouver Police Department Steve Rai, all three of whom addressed the congregation after the mass.

Over the years, several notable people had their funeral requiem mass said at the cathedral, including beloved local lifeguard and swim instructor Joe Fortes (1922), Chief Dan George of the Tsleil-Waututh Nation (1981), and former Vancouver police commissioner William Cameron Murphy in 1961. The funeral of Fortes in February 1922 saw the cathedral filled to capacity, with thousands of others braving the rain and cold weather to view the funeral procession on the streets of Vancouver. Requiem masses were also held at the cathedral for popes Pius XI (1939), John Paul II (2005), Benedict XVI (2023), and Francis (2025), while an interfaith requiem was also held for former Governor General of Canada Georges Vanier in 1967.

== Architecture ==
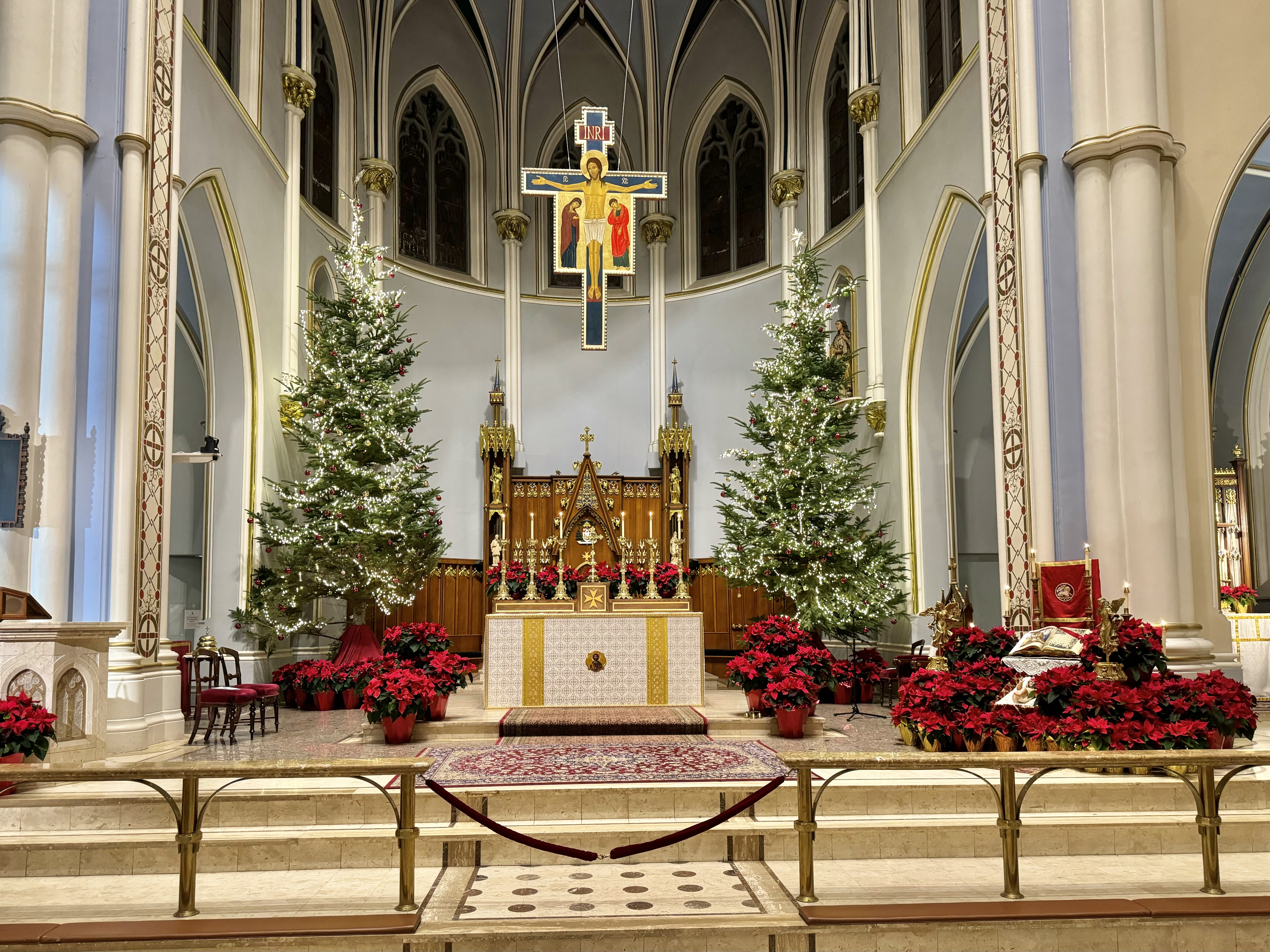
The altar and sanctuary of the cathedral, decorated for the Christmas season in 2024–2025.

The cathedral, built in a French Gothic style, is cruciform in the shape of the Latin cross. The exterior walls of the church were built from sandstone originating from Gabriola Island, while its foundations were made of granite. The two bell towers – which are asymmetric – have been labelled as the cathedral's "most prominent visual feature". The taller steeple was originally designed to have flying buttresses at the bottom. The interior features columns that support the nave which are made from red Scagliola marble. The cathedra is situated at the centre of the sanctuary, surrounded by an oak altar-piece and two towers of reredos. In total, the dimensions of the church building are 161 ft (49 m) long, 104 ft (32 m) wide and 62 ft (19 m) tall, with the taller steeple rising to 217 ft (66 m).

Over the years, the cathedral has undergone a series of renovations. In late 1932, the "tin scales" that covered spire of the taller steeple were cleaned and repaired, and the cross atop of it was repainted. The reordering of the sanctuary took place in the 1960s after the Second Vatican Council. Refurbishing also took place prior to Pope John Paul II's visit to the cathedral in 1984. The cathedral was completely re-roofed from 1995 to 1997, with zinc being utilized on the roof to resemble slate. In December 2002, some of the carpeting was removed and replaced with Italian ceramic tiles, and the inside of the church was repainted from 2004 to 2006.

=== Bells ===
When the cathedral was first built, seven bells – representing the sacraments – were cast at the Fonderie Paccard in Annecy-le-Vieux, Savoy, France and were blessed on October 21, 1900. However, they were soon found to be out of tune and were sent back to Europe, this time to a foundry near Bristol. This time, eight bells were made in order to complete an entire octave when rung. They were reinstalled in the cathedral in 1906 and operate on change ringing. They are one of the few peal of bells hung in the English style found in North America, and one of three in British Columbia – the others are located at Westminster Abbey in Mission and Victoria's Christ Church Cathedral. The bells were notably rung on Dominion Day in 1911 – the first peal ever to be rung in Canada – and on February 12, 2010, in honour of the opening of the 2010 Winter Olympics in Vancouver.

=== Organ ===
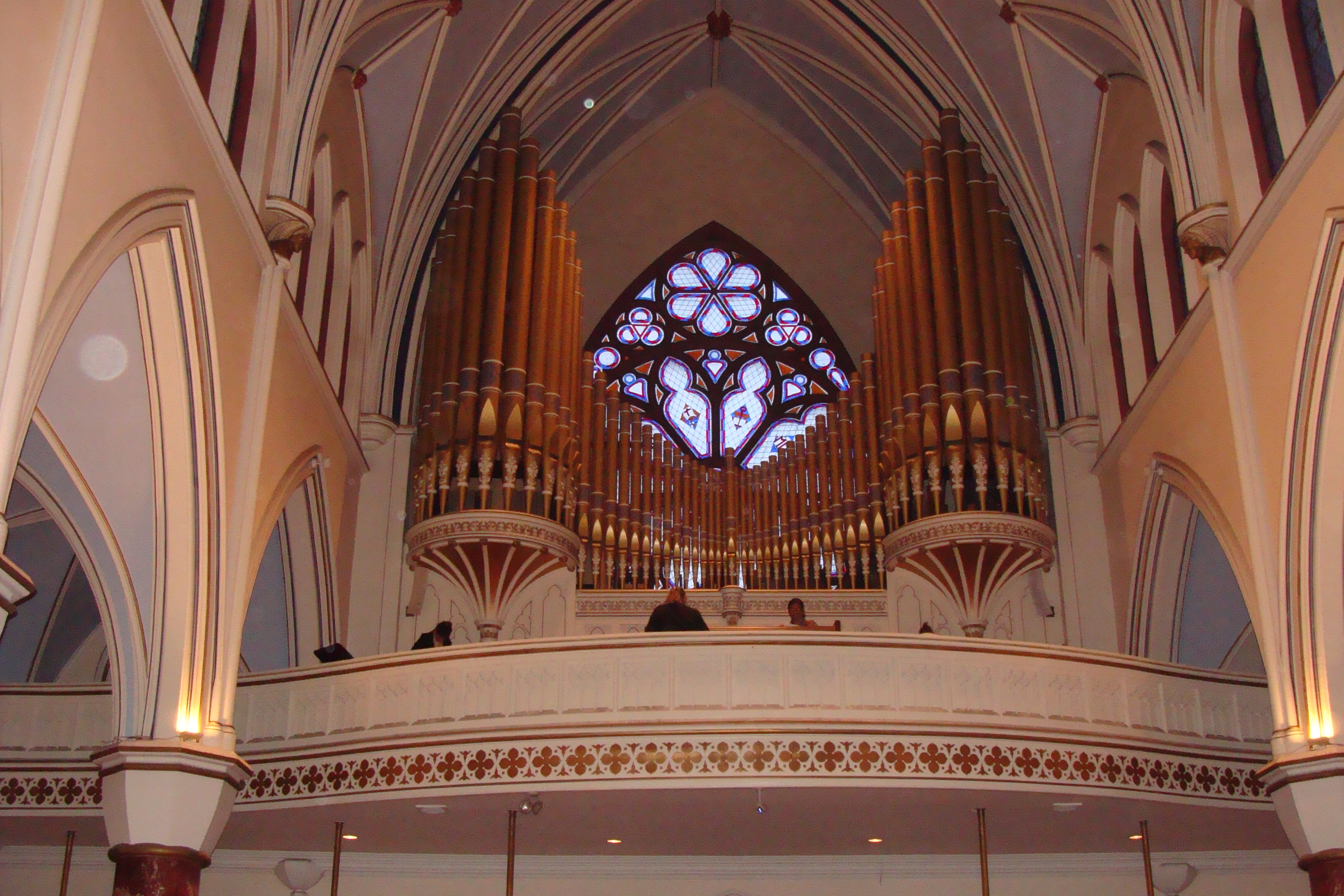
The pipe organ was restored in 2000 and contains 2,899 pipes.

The cathedral's pipe organ was originally built and inaugurated in the autumn of 1900. Manufactured by the Karn–Warren Organ Company in Woodstock, Ontario, the organ is the "oldest romantic-style organ" in the province "remaining in its original location". Over the years, the instrument's condition deteriorated due to "general wear and tear", shoddy repairs and water damage caused by the leaking roof. As a result, the organ was dismantled in 1999 and transported to Casavant Frères in Saint-Hyacinthe, Quebec. It was restored within two years and returned to the church, where it was blessed in Easter of 2000. In that same year, an organ concert series was hosted at the cathedral for the first time, and has been held annually since.

=== Stained glass windows ===
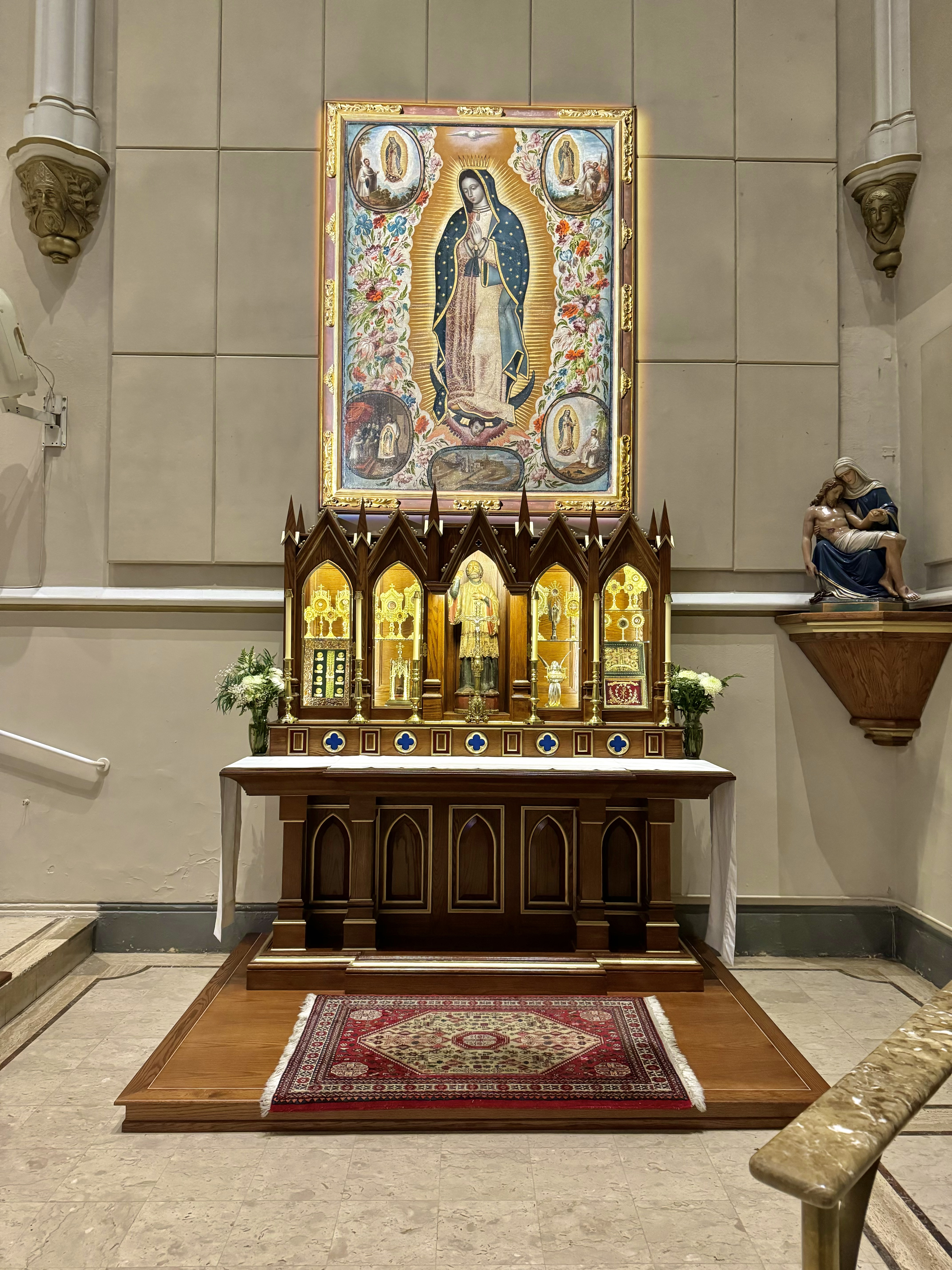
The cathedral's side altar, containing the relics of various saints.

There are currently 21 stained glass windows at the cathedral. The most renowned ones are the five windows made by Canadian artist Guido Nincheri. They depict Our Lady of the Holy Rosary, the Baptism of Our Lord, Jesus Healing the Sick, Jesus with the Children and the Assumption. The window showing Our Lady of the Holy Rosary featured on Canada Post's annual Christmas stamp in 1997. Furthermore, the Institute for Stained Glass in Canada documented the stained glass windows at the cathedral.

=== Altar of relics ===
Located to the right of the main altar and sanctuary is the side altar of relics. Completed in late 2024, it was specially constructed to display the relics of various saints for public veneration, including the Twelve Apostles, the Canadian Martyrs (Jean de Brébeuf, Gabriel Lalemant, and Charles Garnier), Thomas Aquinas, Thomas More, Thérèse of Lisieux, Pope John Paul II, and Mother Teresa.

=== Sculpture of Homeless Jesus ===
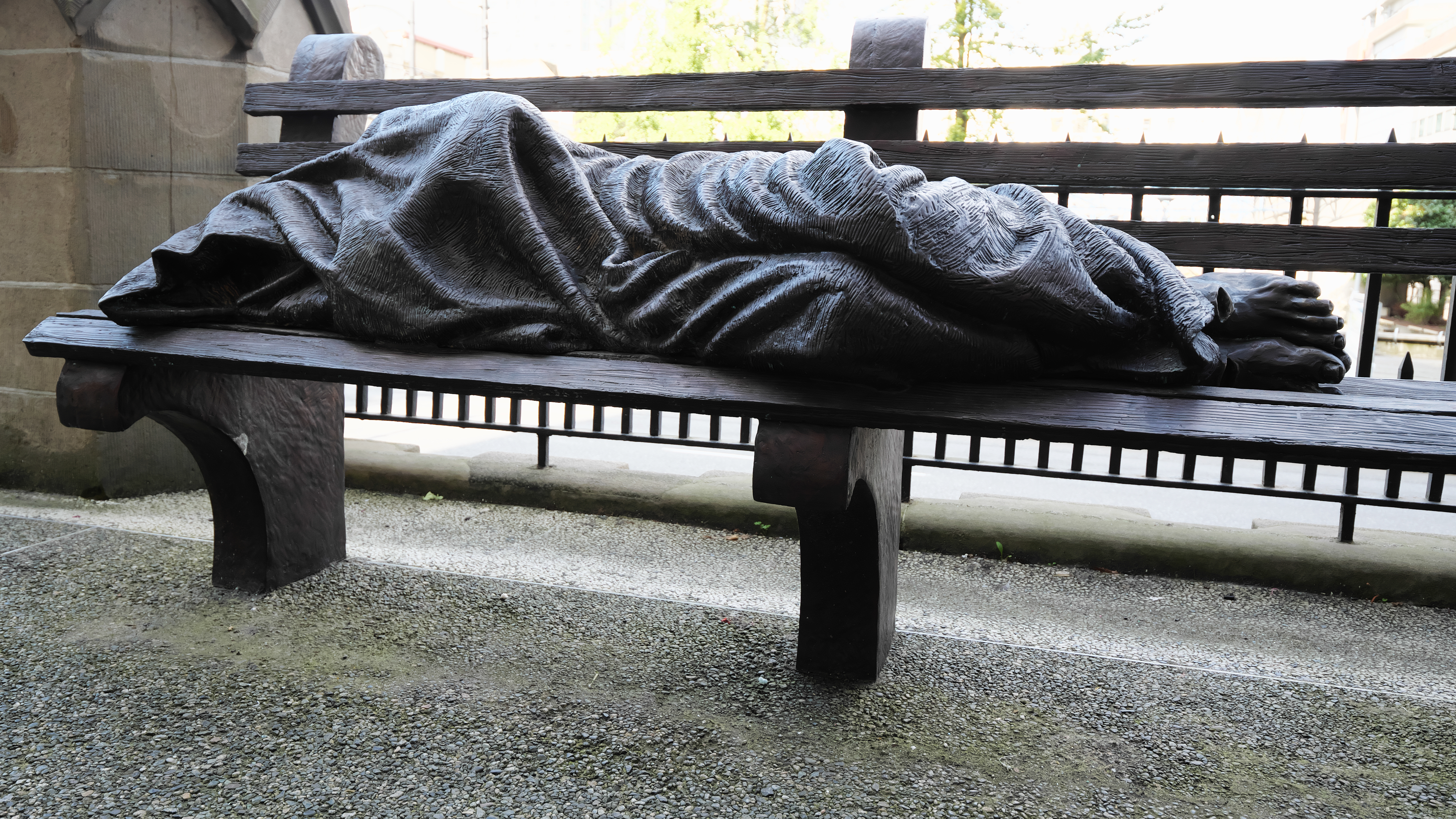
The sculpture Homeless Jesus by Timothy Schmalz at the cathedral's entrance.

A copy of the bronze sculpture Homeless Jesus by Canadian artist Timothy Schmalz was installed in front of the cathedral in the spring of 2017. It shows a life-size man with a long overcoat lying on a park bench. His face is hidden underneath a hood, and his bare feet have stigmata. According to Stanley Galvon, the rector at the time, the statue is intended to be "a catalyst to make people think about" the city's homelessness crisis.

== Modern day ==
The cathedral made news in 2007, with the Vancouver Police Department having to be called in on a weekly basis; cathedral staff claimed they were "under siege" by panhandlers who frequented the building and who were involved in at least one incident daily. These revelations came to light when a homeless man mugged an 81-year-old parishioner in the cathedral on August 1 of that year and was caught on camera.

On March 23, 2008, First Nations protesters disrupted an Easter Sunday Mass at the cathedral by demonstrating on the outside steps. They ordered the Church to "get off native land" and demanded that they disclose the burial locations of children who died in residential schools. A similar protest occurred on October 30, 2011, when a splinter group from the Occupy Vancouver movement marched to the cathedral from the Vancouver Art Gallery. They attempted to enter the cathedral and occupy it but were thwarted by Vancouver police officers and Knights of Columbus.

Sunday Mass was celebrated without a congregation for the first time in the cathedral's history on March 22, 2020. This came as a result of the Archdiocese suspending all public masses starting from March 21 onwards, in response to the 2019–20 coronavirus pandemic. Public masses at the cathedral resumed three months later in June, with capacity reduced to 50 people per Mass in order to adhere to the physical distancing requirements set out by the provincial health authorities.

== See also ==
- List of heritage buildings in Vancouver
