= Richard W. Smith =

Canadian Catholic archbishop

His Grace, The Most Reverend Richard W. Smith
- Metropolitan Archbishop of Vancouver
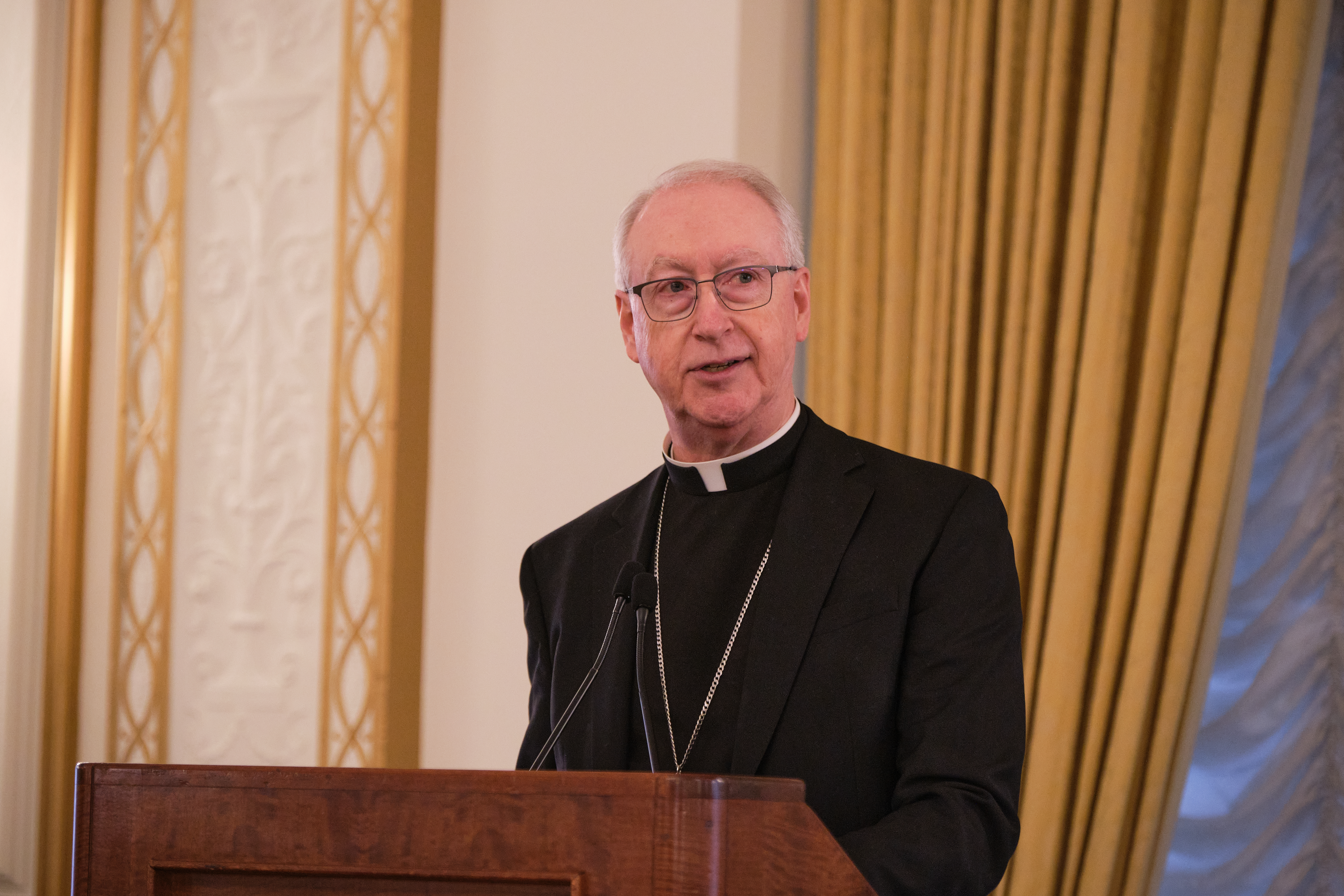
- Smith in 2025
- Archdiocese: Vancouver
- Appointed: February 25, 2025
- Installed: May 23, 2025
- Predecessor: J. Michael Miller
- Previous posts: Bishop of Pembroke (2002–2007); Metropolitan Archbishop of Edmonton (2007–2025); President of the Canadian Conference of Catholic Bishops (2011–2013)

Orders
- Ordination: May 23, 1987
- Consecration: June 18, 2002 by Marcel Gervais

Personal details
- Born: April 28, 1959 (age 67) Halifax, Nova Scotia, Canada
- Denomination: Roman Catholic
- Education: Saint Mary's University, Atlantic School of Theology, Pontifical Gregorian University (1993, 1998)
- Motto: Fiat Voluntas Tua (English: "Thy Will Be Done")
- Coat of arms: Richard W. Smith's coat of arms

Ordination history
History
Episcopal consecration
- Principal consecrator: Marcel Gervais (Ottawa)
- Co-consecrators: Terrence Prendergast (Halifax); Austin-Emile Burke (Halifax em.)
Episcopal succession
Bishops consecrated by Richard W. Smith as principal consecrator
- Gregory Bittman: September 3, 2012
- Paul Terrio: December 12, 2012
- Gary Franken: December 12, 2022

Styles of Richard W. Smith
- Reference style: His Grace; The Most Reverend
- Spoken style: Your Grace; Your Excellency
- Religious style: Archbishop

Richard William Smith (born April 28, 1959) is a Canadian prelate of the Roman Catholic Church. He is the metropolitan archbishop of Vancouver, having previously served as Bishop of Pembroke and Metropolitan Archbishop of Edmonton.

The metropolitan archbishop is currently a member of the Canadian Catholic Indigenous Council and the Catholic Near East Welfare Association (CNEWA).

== Early life ==
Smith was born in Halifax, Nova Scotia, on April 28, 1959. He was the oldest of four children of Anne Marie (Butts) and Donald James Smith. Smith studied at St. Mary's University, obtaining a bachelor's degree in communication. He later received a Master of Divinity at the Atlantic School of Theology. He furthered his studies in Rome at the Pontifical Gregorian University, from which he earned a licentiate in 1993 and a Doctor of Sacred Theology degree five years later.

== Presbyteral ministry ==
Smith was ordained to the priesthood on May 23, 1987, for the metropolitan Archdiocese of Halifax–Yarmouth.

Within the Archdiocese of Halifax–Yarmouth, Smith served in a number of positions. From 1987 to 1991, he served as the parish vicar of the Immaculate Conception parish in Truro. He was made chaplain responsible for the pastoral ministry of French-speaking Catholics in Halifax in 1990. Five years later, he received his first pastoral charge as a parish priest of Saint Peter's in Sheet Harbour. In 1997, he became the parish priest of the towns of Bridgewater and Lunenburg, as well as the community of Elmwood. In 1999, he became the administrator of Saint John the Baptist in Halifax. Smith was made vicar general of the archdiocese in 2001 and held the position until the following year.

Smith was also a professor of sacramental and dogmatic theology at St. Peter's Seminary in London, Ontario. He contributed to diocesan formation programs for deacons and lay faithful.

== Episcopal ministry ==
=== Regional and National (2002–present) ===
Since 2003, Smith has been a member of the English Sector Commission for Christian Education in the Canadian Conference of Catholic Bishops

In 2009, Smith was made vice president of the Canadian Conference of Catholic Bishops. In 2011, he became the conference's president and held the position until 2013. He serves as the conference's current chairman. Smith was a member of the conference's Episcopal Working Group for the Coordination of Indigenous Initiatives and then of the ad hoc Committee for Indigenous Issues.

In 2015, Smith was selected as the second national delegate of the English Sector to the XIV Ordinary General Assembly of the Synod of Bishops.

In 2018, Smith participated in reconciliation dialogue with Canadian national Indigenous leadership. In April 2022, Smith participated in the Indigenous delegation that met with Pope Francis in Rome. He was the lead coordinator for the Visit by Pope Francis to Canada in 2022.

He is also the national spiritual advisor of the Catholic Women's League of Canada, and president of the Ontario Conference of Catholic Bishops.

=== Pembroke (2002–2007) ===
On April 27, 2002, Smith was appointed the seventh Bishop of Pembroke by Pope John Paul II. He received his episcopal consecration at St. Columbkille Cathedral, on the following June 18 from Archbishop Marcel Gervais, with archbishops Terrence Prendergast, S.J. and Austin-Emile Burke serving as co-consecrators.

=== Edmonton (2007–2025) ===
He was named the eighth metropolitan Archbishop of Edmonton by Pope Benedict XVI on March 22, 2007, being formally installed on the following May 1.

In January 2016, Smith visited the Pallotine Province of the Assumption of the B.V.M. in Bangalore, India. Eight Pallotines of the province serve in the Archdiocese of Edmonton.

=== Vancouver (2025–present) ===
Pope Francis appointed Smith Metropolitan Archbishop of Vancouver on February 25, 2025.

== Media ==
Smith co-hosted Upfront with the Archbishop with Jenny Connelly from May 10, 2022, until its conclusion on October 29, 2024, releasing 106 episodes ranging from 18 minutes to an hour and a half. The podcast was published on Apple Podcasts and Spotify, and select episodes included video which was published on the podcasts YouTube channel of the same name. The podcast sought to strengthen the relationship between the hierarchy and the faithful through informal conversations about our Catholic faith.

CBC News' Clare Bonnyman interviewed Smith and Connelly about their podcast on CBC News' podcast Deep Dive.

Catholic Church titles
| Preceded by Brendan O'Brien | Bishop of Pembroke; 2002—2007 | Succeeded by Michael Mulhall |
| Preceded by Thomas Christopher Collins | Archbishop of Edmonton; 2007–2025 | Vacant |
| Preceded by J. Michael Miller | Archbishop of Vancouver; 2025–present | Incumbent |
