= List of Roman Catholic archbishops of Vancouver =

Archbishops of the Roman Catholic Archdiocese of Vancouver

Archbishop of Vancouver
- Archbishopric

catholic
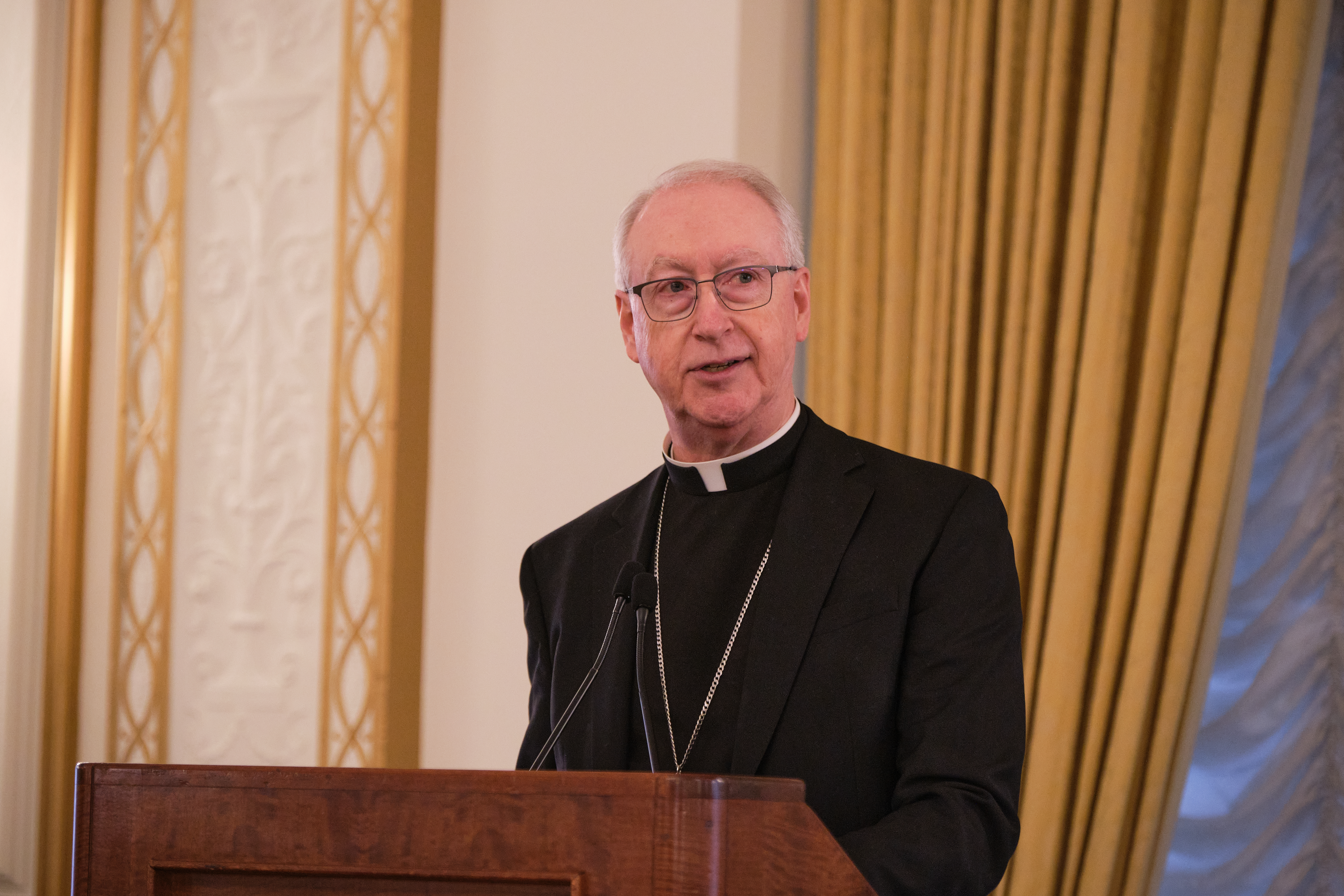
- Richard W. Smith, the Archbishop of Vancouver since 2025

- The coat of arms of the Archdiocese of Vancouver
- Incumbent: Richard W. Smith

Information
- First holder: Louis-Joseph d'Herbomez (apostolic vicar); Augustin Dontenwill (archbishop)
- Established: 1863 (apostolic vicariate); 1908 (archbishopric)
- Archdiocese: Vancouver
- Cathedral: Holy Rosary Cathedral

Website
- http://www.rcav.org/

The archbishop of Vancouver is the head of the Roman Catholic Archdiocese of Vancouver who is responsible for looking after its "spiritual and administrative needs". As the archdiocese is the metropolitan see of the ecclesiastical province encompassing nearly all of British Columbia, the archbishop of Vancouver also administers the bishops who head the suffragan dioceses of Kamloops, Nelson, Prince George, and Victoria. The current archbishop is Richard W. Smith.

The archdiocese began as the Vicariate Apostolic of British Columbia, which was created on December 14, 1863. Louis-Joseph d'Herbomez was appointed its first bishop, and under his reign, the first parish was formed at the Holy Rosary church. On September 2, 1890, the vicariate was elevated to the status of diocese by Pope Leo XIII and was based in New Westminster. On account of the rapid expansion and development of Vancouver, the Holy See decided to centre the archdiocese around the city. As a result, the Diocese of New Westminster became the Archdiocese of Vancouver, and the Archdiocese of Victoria was reduced to diocesan level on September 7, 1908. Augustin Dontenwill became the first archbishop of the newly formed metropolitan see in Vancouver, British Columbia.

Ten men have been Archbishop of Vancouver; another two were heads of its antecedent jurisdictions. Of these, four were members of the Missionary Oblates of Mary Immaculate (OMI), and one (Dontenwill) became the superior general of the order. Neil McNeil, the fourth ordinary of the archdiocese, was the first archbishop who did not belong to a religious order. James Carney, whose episcopacy spanned from 1969 to 1990, was the first archbishop born in Vancouver. William Mark Duke had the longest tenure as Archbishop of Vancouver, serving for 33 years from 1931 to 1964, while McNeil held the position for two years (1910–1912), marking the shortest archiepiscopacy.

== List of ordinaries ==
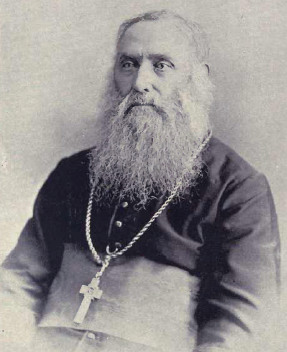
Pierre-Paul Durieu reigned from 1890 to 1899 as Bishop of New Westminster, the precursor to Archdiocese of Vancouver.

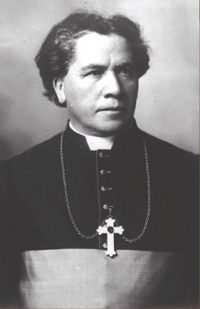
Augustin Dontenwill was the first archbishop after Vancouver was raised to the status of archdiocese.

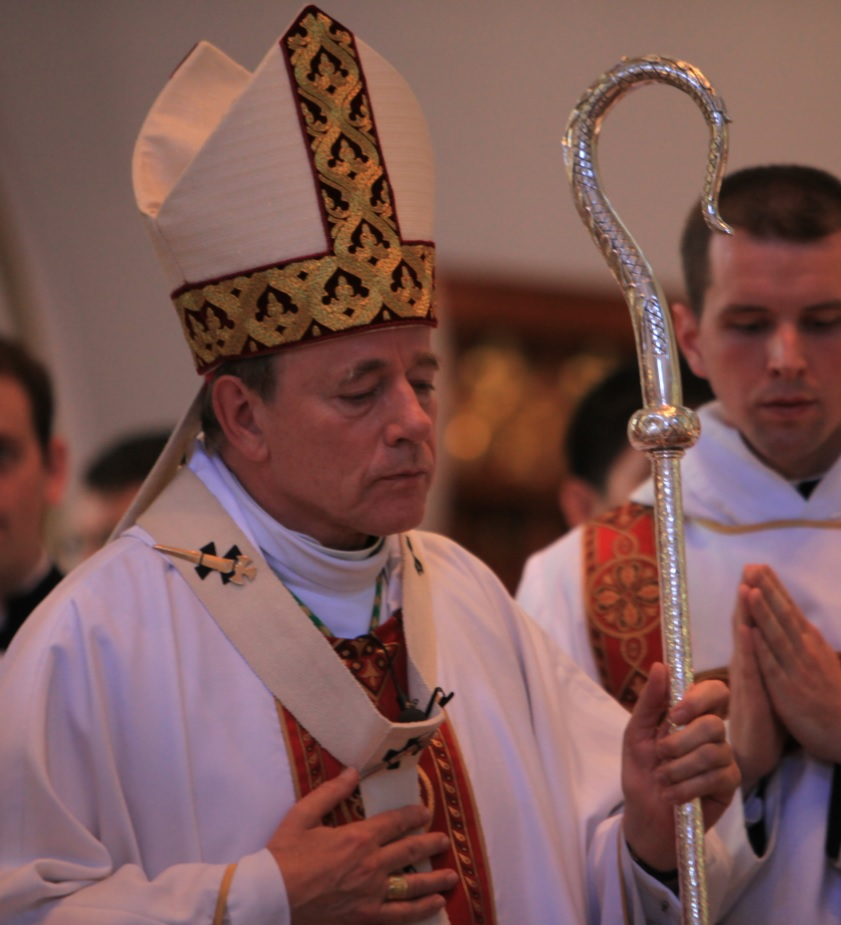
J. Michael Miller was Archbishop of Vancouver for 16 years, serving from 2009 until his retirement in 2025.

Key
CSB	Congregation of St. Basil
OMI	Missionary Oblates of Mary Immaculate
SM	Society of Mary (Marianists)

=== Apostolic Vicars of British Columbia ===
Apostolic Vicars
From	Until	Incumbent	Notes	Ref(s)
1863	1890	Louis-Joseph d'Herbomez, OMI	Appointed on December 22, 1863. Died on June 3, 1890.	
1890	1890	Pierre-Paul Durieu, OMI	Coadjutor apostolic vicar (Note: Under the Code of Canon Law, the coadjutor bishop has the right of succession (cum jure successionis) upon the death, retirement or resignation of the diocesan bishop he is assisting.) from 1875 to 1890.	

=== Bishops of New Westminster ===
Bishops
From	Until	Incumbent	Notes	Ref(s)
1890	1899	Pierre-Paul Durieu, OMI	Became the first Bishop of New Westminster on September 2, 1890. Died on June 1, 1899.	
1899	1908	Augustin Dontenwill, OMI	Coadjutor bishop from 1897 to 1899.	

=== Archbishops of Vancouver ===
Archbishops
From	Until	Incumbent	Notes	Ref(s)
1908	1910	Augustin Dontenwill, OMI	Became the first archbishop of Vancouver on September 19, 1908, but resigned shortly after because of his election as superior general of the Missionary Oblates of Mary Immaculate (OMI). Died on November 30, 1931.	
1910	1912	Neil McNeil	Appointed on January 19, 1910. First diocesan priest to be archbishop. Resigned in 1912 after being appointed Archbishop of Toronto. Died on May 25, 1934.	
1912	1931	Timothy Casey	Appointed on August 2, 1912. Died on October 5, 1931.	
1931	1964	William Mark Duke	Coadjutor archbishop from 1928 to 1931. Retired on March 11, 1964. Died on August 31, 1971.	
1964	1969	Martin Michael Johnson	Coadjutor archbishop from 1954 to 1964. Resigned on January 8, 1969. Died on January 29, 1975.	
1969	1990	James Carney	Auxiliary bishop from 1966 to 1969. Appointed on January 8, 1969. First archbishop born in Vancouver, British Columbia. Died on September 16, 1990.	
1991	2004	Adam Exner, OMI	Appointed on May 25, 1991. Retired on January 10, 2004, after reaching the mandatory retirement age of 75. Died on September 5, 2023.	
2004	2009	Raymond Roussin, SM	Appointed on January 10, 2004. Resigned on January 2, 2009. Died on April 24, 2015.	
2009	2025	J. Michael Miller, CSB	Coadjutor archbishop from 2007 to 2009. Retired on February 25, 2025, after reaching the mandatory retirement age of 75.	
2025	present	Richard W. Smith	Appointed on February 25, 2025.	
