= William Mark Duke =

Canadian Catholic archbishop (1879–1971)

The Most Reverend William Mark Duke
- Archbishop of Vancouver
- Church: Catholic Church
- Archdiocese: Vancouver
- Installed: October 5, 1931
- Term ended: March 11, 1964
- Predecessor: Timothy Casey
- Successor: Martin Michael Johnson
- Other post: Titular Archbishop of Seleucia in Isauria (1964–1971)
- Previous posts: Coadjutor Archbishop of Vancouver (1928–1931); Titular Archbishop of Phasis (1928–1931)

Orders
- Ordination: June 29, 1903 by Timothy Casey
- Consecration: October 18, 1928 by Timothy Casey

Personal details
- Born: October 7, 1879 Saint John, New Brunswick, Canada
- Died: August 31, 1971 (aged 91) Vancouver, British Columbia, Canada
- Buried: Gardens of Gethsemani, Surrey, British Columbia
- Motto: Duc in altum (Launch out into the deep)

William Mark Duke (October 7, 1879 – August 31, 1971) was a Canadian prelate of the Roman Catholic Church, who served as Archbishop of Vancouver from 1931 to 1964.

== Biography ==
Born in Saint John, New Brunswick, on October 7, 1879.

=== Ordination ===
William Duke was ordained to the priesthood at age 23 on June 29, 1903.

=== Consecration ===
He was appointed Coadjutor Archbishop of Vancouver and Titular Bishop of Phasis by Pope Pius XI on August 10, 1928. He received his episcopal consecration on the following October 18 from Archbishop Timothy Casey. Duke later succeeded the late Archbishop Casey as full Archbishop of Vancouver on October 5, 1931.

== Legacy ==
- He founded St. Mark's College, a Catholic Theological College in affiliation with the University of British Columbia.
- He helped found Notre Dame Regional Secondary School, a Catholic high school for Vancouver (eastside) & Burnaby.
- He helped found St. Thomas Aquinas Regional Secondary School, a Catholic high school for North Vancouver.
- Helped found St. Vincent's Hospital, Vancouver which was administered by the Sisters of Charity. The hospital provided Catholic health care on August 12, 1939. It was closed on March 1, 2003.
- He founded The B.C. Catholic newspaper, the official newspaper of the Archdiocese of Vancouver.
- Mount Duke was named after him in 1966.

== Service to God ==
- Priest for 68 years
- Bishop for 43 years

== Notes ==
He attended the Second Vatican Council from 1962 to 1965. The Archbishop was a "strict disciplinarian", and was also known as the "Iron Duke". He was opposed to Sunday picnics, dances, alcohol, and Marxism, and once said of bathing beauty contests, "It lowers the dignity and esteem due to women to parade them and measure them ... like cattle." However, Duke was dedicated to vocations, establishing parishes and parochial schools.

On October 30, 1953, he received the degree of Doctor of Laws, (honoris causa) from the University of British Columbia.

On October 1, 1968, he received the Freedom of the City Award from the Vancouver City Council.

He retired as Vancouver's archbishop on March 11, 1964, after thirty-two years of service. Upon his retirement, Duke was appointed Titular Archbishop of Seleucia in Isauria. He died seven years later, on August 31, 1971, at the age of 91.

Styles of William Duke
- Reference style: The Most Reverend
- Spoken style: Your Excellency
- Religious style: Monsignor
- Posthumous style: none

Religious titles
Preceded by Timothy Casey	Archbishop of Vancouver; 1931–1964	Succeeded by Martin Michael Johnson
