= Richard Gagnon =

Canadian Catholic Archbishop of Winnipeg

His Grace, The Most Reverend Richard Gagnon
- Archbishop Emeritus of Winnipeg
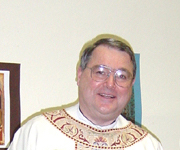
- Gagnon in 2002, when he was a parish priest in Vancouver.
- Church: Catholic Church
- See: Winnipeg
- Appointed: October 28, 2013
- Installed: January 3, 2014
- Term ended: December 30, 2024
- Predecessor: James Weisgerber
- Successor: Murray Chatlain
- Other post: President of the Canadian Conference of Catholic Bishops (2019–2021)
- Previous posts: Vicar General of the Archdiocese of Vancouver (2002–2004); Bishop of Victoria (2004–2013)

Orders
- Ordination: June 24, 1983 by James Carney
- Consecration: July 20, 2004 by Raymond Roussin

Personal details
- Born: June 17, 1948 (age 78) Lethbridge, Alberta, Canada
- Denomination: Catholic
- Education: Simon Fraser University; Pontifical Beda College
- Motto: "To obey is to serve in love"
- Coat of arms

Ordination history
History
Priestly ordination
- Ordained by: James Carney (Vancouver)
- Date: June 24, 1983
- Place: Holy Rosary Cathedral, Vancouver, British Columbia, Canada
Episcopal consecration
- Principal consecrator: Raymond Roussin (Vancouver)
- Co-consecrators: David Monroe (Kamloops); Eugene Cooney (Nelson)
- Date: July 20, 2004
- Place: St. Andrew's Cathedral, Victoria, British Columbia, Canada

Styles of Richard Gagnon
- Reference style: His Grace; The Most Reverend
- Spoken style: Your Grace; Your Excellency
- Religious style: Archbishop

Richard Joseph Gagnon (born June 17, 1948) is a Canadian retired Catholic prelate who served as Archbishop of Winnipeg from 2014 until 2024. He was President of the Canadian Conference of Catholic Bishops (CCCB) from 2019 to 2021, and previously served as the Bishop of Victoria.

Gagnon was born in Alberta and relocated to Greater Vancouver as a child. There, he attended high school and university before studying for the priesthood at the Pontifical Beda College in Rome. He was ordained a priest in 1983 and served in the Archdiocese of Vancouver as an assistant pastor and parish priest for two decades. He became vicar general of the archdiocese in 2002 and was consecrated as a bishop two years later. Gagnon has been noted for his work toward reconciliation with Indigenous peoples in Victoria and Winnipeg. He is also noted for calling the first diocesan synod in the Archdiocese of Winnipeg.

== Early life ==
Gagnon was born in Lethbridge, Alberta, on June 17, 1948, to Thérèse Demers Gagnon and George Gagnon. He is a Franco-Albertan, given his family's ancestral roots in Quebec. Through his matrilineal line, he is "closely related" to, and a collateral descendant of, Modeste Demers, the first Bishop of Vancouver Island (since renamed to the Diocese of Victoria). The Gagnon family moved to British Columbia (BC) during his childhood, and he graduated from St. Thomas Aquinas Regional Secondary School in North Vancouver. Gagnon went on to study philosophy, history and English at Simon Fraser University, obtaining a BC Teaching Certificate in 1976. He subsequently taught at a public school as a band teacher, and could play the clarinet, flute, and saxophone. Starting in 1978, he attended seminary at the Pontifical Beda College in Rome. On June 24, 1983, Gagnon was ordained to the Catholic priesthood at Holy Rosary Cathedral by James Carney, the Archbishop of Vancouver at the time.

== Presbyteral ministry ==
Gagnon's first pastoral assignment was as assistant parish priest at St. Mary's Parish in Vancouver, which he began one month after his ordination. He was then transferred to Corpus Christi Parish as an assistant the following year, before becoming a full-fledged pastor at St. Jude's Parish in 1986. He later served as the first parish priest of St. James Parish in Abbotsford from 1993 until 2002, during which time he was also Dean of the Fraser Valley East Deanery. In March 2002, Gagnon succeeded David Monroe as both pastor of St. John the Apostle Parish and vicar general of the archdiocese, after the latter was appointed as Bishop of Kamloops earlier in January. Gagnon was made a Prelate of Honour of His Holiness in February 2003, in recognition of his service and dedication to the local church. Adam Exner, the Archbishop of Vancouver, noted at the investiture ceremony that Gagnon had "rendered outstanding distinguished service in the Church in Vancouver as a loving, effective, and dedicated pastor, a man who is ever ready to meet new challenges – a servant ready to go wherever called."

== Episcopal ministry ==
=== Bishop of Victoria (2004–2013) ===
Gagnon was appointed as the sixteenth Bishop of Victoria, British Columbia, on May 14, 2004. The see had been vacant since January of that year, when Raymond Roussin was appointed as Archbishop of Vancouver. Gagnon was succeeded as Vancouver's vicar general by Mark Hagemoen. He was consecrated bishop and installed on July 20, 2004, at St. Andrew's Cathedral in Victoria, with Roussin serving as the principal consecrator. The red field and gold Latin cross in his coat of arms was influenced by that of Modeste Demers, Gagnon's aforementioned ancestor and predecessor as bishop of the diocese. Gagnon made his first ad limina visit to the Holy See on October 2, 2006, together with four other bishops from the Assembly of Western Catholic Bishops (AWCB).

Gagnon oversaw the conclusion of a financial and legal debacle for the Diocese of Victoria that began in the 1980s under his predecessor, Remi De Roo. It saw the lending of diocesan funds for an investment in Washington state that subsequently failed. In November 2006, the diocese sold its land in Washington, enabling it to settle its debts completely – this included "full payment to the bond owners", many of whom were parishioners. Two months later, in January 2007, the Diocese won an appeal at the Washington Court of Appeals, successfully reversing a 2005 judgment against it for US$8.5 million in damages for breach of contract.

Controversy erupted when Mike Favero, the pastor of Holy Cross Parish for three years, was seemingly forced to step down on January 18, 2007. This occurred three weeks after the resignation of a gay church administrator. Parishioners alleged that it was Favero's refusal to dismiss the administrator that led to himself being forced out by Gagnon, which Favero later confirmed in an interview with a local television station and to the Times Colonist. At a parish town hall meeting, Gagnon contended that Favero had requested to resign in late spring of 2006 – before the issue arose – for personal reasons, with Gagnon asking him to remain. When the situation became increasingly difficult in November, Favero again requested a sabbatical that would have started in spring 2007. Gagnon also admonished the parish's lay leaders for failing to engender a sense of “balance, fairness and confidentiality to this matter".

Consequently, Favero broke his silence to refute the assertions made at the parish meeting. He expounded how Gagnon requested that he "reorganize the church office" and remove the administrator, without bringing up his sexual orientation. Favero was reluctant to do so and decided to consult with the parish council. Favero said that this incensed Gagnon, who reprimanded him for breaching confidentiality. He then wrote a letter to the bishop cautioning him as to the bad precedent this dismissal would set. Favero also affirmed that he had not wanted to leave Holy Cross that spring, having merely responded to an annual memo from the Diocese's pastoral centre by opining how he would prefer to "be up-Island, close to [his] parents" for his next pastoral assignment. Favero stated that he needed to "defend his integrity", but that he "[did] not want a public battle with the bishop", according to journalist Shannon Moneo. Hundreds of parishioners insisted on an apology from the bishop, with some even calling for Gagnon to resign. The discord between Favero and Gagnon was later resolved. In July 2011, the two participated in a groundbreaking ceremony for a new church where Favero was pastor, and concelebrated the first Mass there ten months later. The Times Colonist reported in 2013 that Favero "took responsibility for not honouring confidentiality and misrepresenting events".

Gagnon served as the AWCB's regional representative on the Permanent Council of the Canadian Conference of Catholic Bishops (CCCB) from 2007 to 2008. He was also on the board of Catholic Missions in Canada starting in 2009. He approved the sale of St. Andrew's Elementary School, located in downtown Victoria, in 2010. This was part of the Diocese's C$20 million plan to renovate and combine its schools. Many schools like St. Andrew's were in need of costly seismic retrofitting and were competing with other nearby Catholic schools for student enrolment. The 150-year-old school closed in June 2013, and was demolished in 2016. Also in 2010, Gagnon went on an 18-day pilgrimage along the Camino de Santiago in northern Spain, where he hiked at least 25 kilometres (15.5 mi) a day.

=== Archbishop of Winnipeg (2013–2024) ===
Gagnon was appointed as the seventh Archbishop of Winnipeg on October 28, 2013, and installed at St. Mary's Cathedral on January 3, 2014. Since the Archbishop also serves as the Chancellor of St. Paul's College and has canonical responsibility for it, Gagnon was installed to that position on April 6 of that year. Philip S. Lee, the Lieutenant Governor of Manitoba and alumnus of the college, was in attendance. Lawrence Huculak, the Metropolitan Archeparch of Winnipeg, remarked how Gagnon's "extensive contact" with First Nations and other ethnic minorities in his past positions made him a fitting selection as archbishop.

Gagnon participated in a reconciliation event with Indigenous peoples organized by the archdiocese on June 4, 2015. He presented a cheque of C$60,000 to the executive director of Returning to Spirit, a First Nations spiritual charity that works in close cooperation with a predominantly Indigenous parish in the inner city. The funds, which were raised at a Mass held at MTS Centre on May 3 to celebrate the centennial of the archdiocese, would go toward teaching people about First Nations residential schools. The director gave him the feather of an eagle, which is the "highest honour that can be bestowed" in First Nations tradition. Earlier that week, the Truth and Reconciliation Commission of Canada – which documented the country's residential school system – issued 94 calls to action. One of these implored the Pope to go to Canada and apologize in person to the survivors of residential schools, comparable to the apology made in 2010 to the victims of sexual abuse in Ireland. In an interview with the Canadian Broadcasting Corporation (CBC), Gagnon articulated his belief that a future papal visit to Canada – which he supports – should not be made merely for the purposes of an apology, since "that ground has been covered already". He was referring to the 2009 meeting in Rome, in which Pope Benedict XVI expressed sorrow to a delegation of Indigenous Canadians that included Phil Fontaine, the National Chief of the Assembly of First Nations at the time. That meeting was organized by Gagnon's immediate predecessor as archbishop, James Weisgerber. In another interview with the CBC's Power & Politics in 2018, Gagnon expounded on how he did not want a visit by the Pope and a resulting apology from him to be reduced to "just a matter of ticking off a particular call to action".

Gagnon was elected President of the AWCB in February 2016, succeeding David Motiuk. Three months later, he called the first diocesan synod in the history of the archdiocese. The two-year-long process consisted of six sessions in which delegates from the local Catholic community "deliberate on the pastoral needs of the diocese". He also reached out to lapsed and former Catholics for their input as to what direction the local church should take moving forward. Gagnon made his second ad limina visit on March 27, 2017, alongside the other bishops of the Assembly. Several weeks later, he voiced his dismay at the decision by the Manitoba Liquor & Lotteries Corporation to allow casinos in the province to open on Good Friday and Easter Sunday for the first time. He observed how this placed profit-making before the welfare of employees, adding how the long Easter weekend was one of the rare times in the year in which "families get together". Later that September, Gagnon was elected as the CCCB's vice president. He had another audience with Pope Francis that year on December 9, together with CCCB president Lionel Gendron and secretary general Frank Leo. The trio met again with the Holy Father on December 6, 2018.

At the CCCB's annual gathering in September 2019, Gagnon was elected as President of the Conference for a two-year term. Reacting to his selection, he said he felt humbled that his fellow bishops had "placed their confidence and trust in me." He emphasized how his role was not to advance "any kind of platform or agenda" or to "issue orders", but to instead be a facilitator and offer guidelines. On December 12 of that year, Gagnon made his first visit to the Pope as the Conference's president. His tenure as CCCB president ended in October 2021 and he was succeeded by Raymond Poisson.

== Later life ==
After a decade of serving as Archbishop of Winnipeg, Gagnon reached the mandatory retirement age of 75 in June 2023. His resignation was accepted by Pope Francis on December 30 of the following year, and he was succeeded by Murray Chatlain. Gagnon subsequently returned to the Archdiocese of Vancouver to reside in Abbotsford.

== Distinctions ==
- Holy See: Order of the Holy Sepulchre (May 18, 2012)

Catholic Church titles
Preceded by David Monroe	Vicar General of the Archdiocese of Vancouver; 2002–2004	Succeeded by Mark Hagemoen
Preceded by Raymond Roussin	Bishop of Victoria; 2004–2013	Succeeded by Gary Gordon
Preceded by James Weisgerber	Archbishop of Winnipeg; 2013–2024	Succeeded by Murray Chatlain
Preceded by Lionel Gendron	President of the Canadian Conference of Catholic Bishops; 2019–2021	Succeeded by Raymond Poisson
Academic offices
Preceded by James Weisgerber	Chancellor of St. Paul's College; 2014–present	Incumbent
