= St. Andrew's Cathedral (Victoria, British Columbia) =

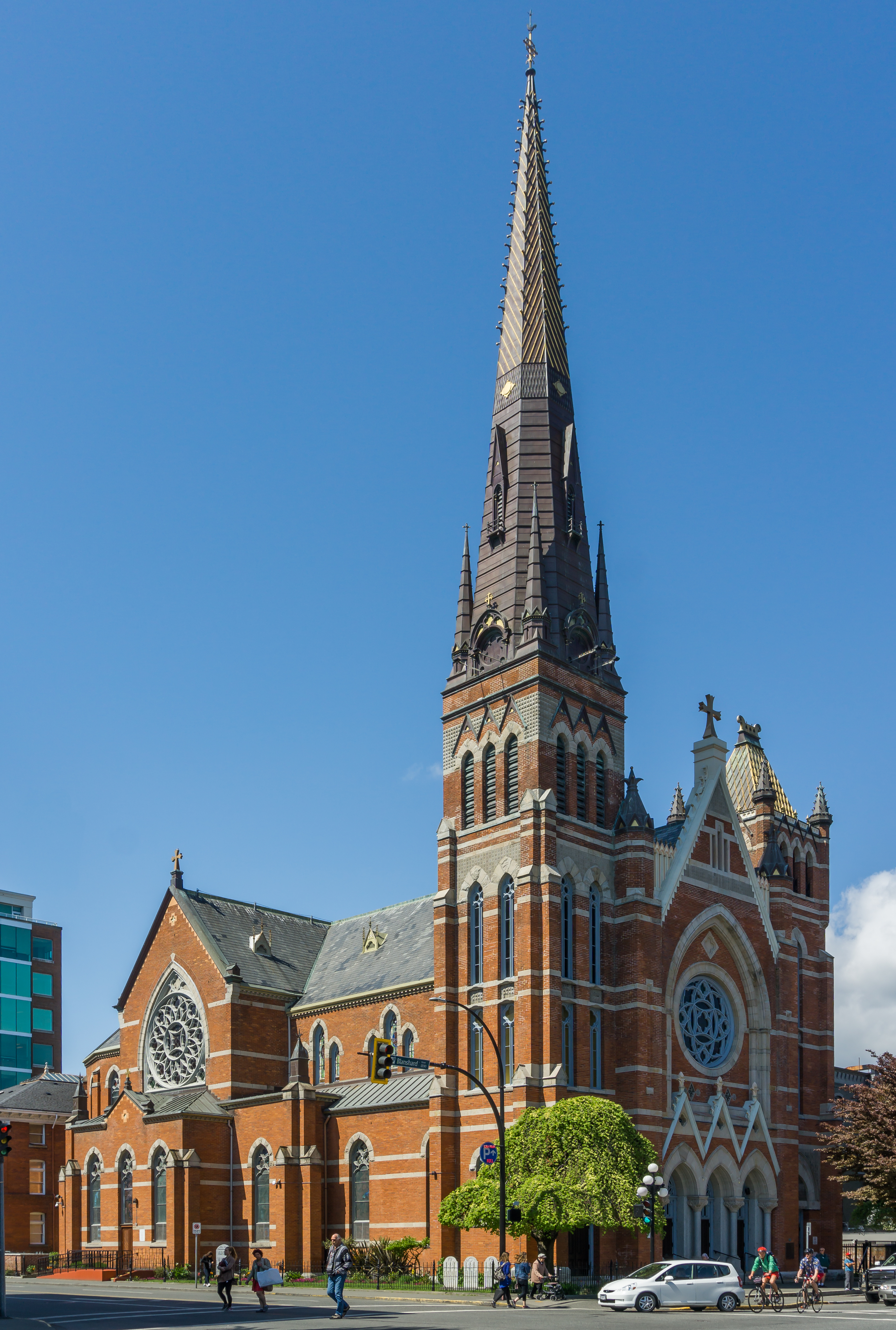
- St. Andrew's Cathedral
- 48.425417°N 123.362861°W
- Location: 740 View Street; Victoria, British Columbia; V8W 1J8
- Country: Canada
- Denomination: Roman Catholic
- Website: standrewscathedral.com

History
- Status: Cathedral

Architecture
- Functional status: Active
- Architect(s): Perrault and Messier
- Architectural type: Maurice Perrault and Albert Mesnard
- Style: High Victorian Gothic
- Groundbreaking: 1890
- Completed: 1892
- Construction cost: C$81,052 (Note: Figure is not adjusted for inflation)

Administration
- Province: British Columbia
- Metropolis: Vancouver
- Diocese: Victoria
- Parish: St. Andrew's Parish

Clergy
- Bishop: Gary Gordon

National Historic Site of Canada
- Official name: St. Andrew's Roman Catholic Cathedral National Historic Site of Canada
- Designated: 1990

St. Andrew's Cathedral is the Roman Catholic cathedral for the Diocese of Victoria in British Columbia, Canada. Built in the High Victorian Gothic style, St. Andrew's was Victoria's third cathedral to be built.

== History ==
The cathedral is the third building to be used by the parish. The first building was used from 1858 to 1884 (presently used as the Chapel of St. Ann's Academy on Humboldt Street). The second building was used from 1884 to 1892 (situated behind the current building now occupied by the St. Andrew's Square office building), after which the parish moved into the present cathedral.

Work on the new cathedral began in 1890. At 8:00 a.m. on October 30, 1892, Bishop Jean-Nicolas Lemmens blessed the building before celebrating a Pontifical High Mass at 10:00 a.m. The cathedral has been a National Historic Site of Canada since 1990.

== Design ==
The present cathedral was designed by architects Maurice Perrault and Albert Mesnard. The total cost of the building was C$81,052. Based on the plans for a church built in Vaudreuil-Dorion, Quebec, Perrault and Mesnard borrowed much from the medieval architecture of European churches. The double asymmetrical towers are typical of Quebec churches and a characteristic of the High Victorian Gothic style. This was an attempt to follow the "unfinished" look that made fourteenth and fifteenth century churches popular. The main tower boasts a 53.4 m (175 ft) spire that was designed to hold a clock and a set of bells.

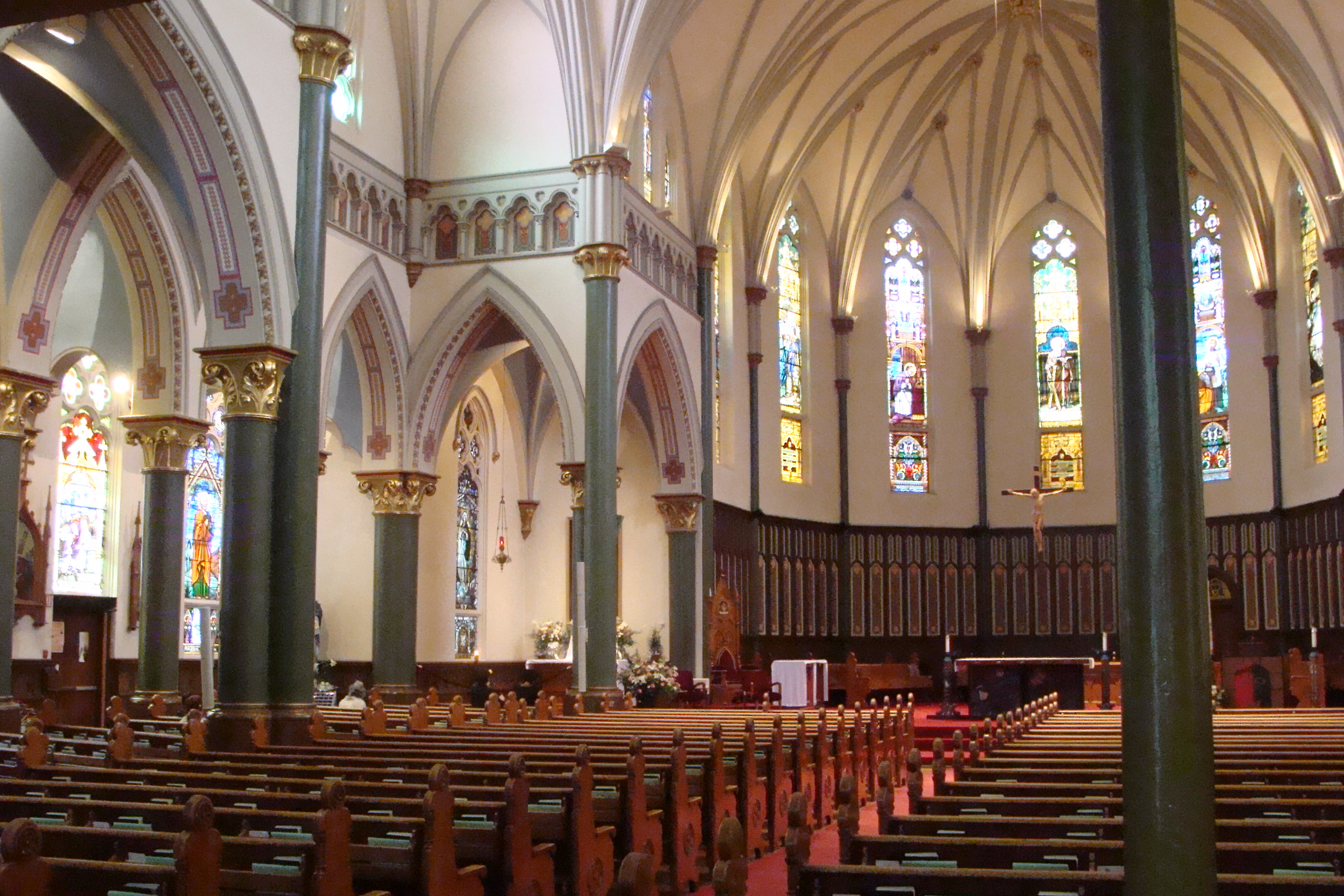
View of the altar from the nave

The nave is 22-metre-long (72 ft), with a rose window. The Institute for Stained Glass in Canada has documented the stained glass at St Andrew's Catholic Cathedral. The cathedral houses 21 large Portland-style stained glass windows and two large rose windows with a smaller one above the gallery.

An altar was commissioned for use on the twenty-fifth anniversary of Bishop Remi Joseph De Roo's episcopal ordination. Carved by Charles W. Elliott, the first Native American to graduate from St. Louis College, the altar consists of two bentwood boxes. The boxes can be rotated to show four separate designs for the different liturgical seasons. The top of the altar or is carved from yellow cedar (Nootka Cypress) and weighs approximately 400 pounds (180 kg).

The cathedral also displays a carved lectern by artist Roy Henry Vickers. It depicts a black and red image of Christ, representing the crucified Christ and the risen Christ.

=== Crypt ===
The cathedral houses a crypt, where three of Victoria's former Bishops are interred:

- Bishop Modeste Demers, the first Bishop of Victoria.
- Charles John Seghers, the second and fourth Bishop, murdered in Alaska.
- Rt. Rev. John J. Jonckau, a former Vicar General of the Diocese of Victoria who was named as Bishop but died before being consecrated.

== See also ==
- List of cathedrals in Canada
- List of historic places in Victoria, British Columbia
