= Remi De Roo =

Canadian Catholic bishop (1924–2022)

The Most Reverend Remi De Roo
- Bishop of Victoria
- Diocese: Victoria
- Appointed: October 29, 1962
- Installed: December 20, 1962
- Term ended: March 18, 1999
- Predecessor: James Michael Hill
- Successor: Raymond Roussin

Orders
- Ordination: June 8, 1950 by Arthur Béliveau
- Consecration: December 14, 1962 by Maurice Baudoux

Personal details
- Born: Remi Joseph De Roo; February 24, 1924 Swan Lake, Manitoba, Canada
- Died: February 1, 2022 (aged 97) Victoria, British Columbia, Canada
- Education: Collège de Saint-Boniface; Pontifical University of Saint Thomas Aquinas
- Motto: Aedificatio in Caritate

Styles of Remi De Roo
- Reference style: His Excellency, The Most Reverend
- Spoken style: Your Excellency
- Religious style: Bishop

Ordination history of Remi De Roo
History
Priestly ordination
- Ordained by: Arthur Béliveau
Episcopal consecration
- Principal consecrator: Maurice Baudoux (Saint Boniface)
- Co-consecrators: Georges Cabana (Sherbrooke); Martin Michael Johnson (Vancouver coad.)

Remi Joseph De Roo (February 24, 1924 – February 1, 2022) was a Canadian bishop of the Catholic Church. He was Bishop of Victoria from 1962 to 1999 and the longest-serving Catholic bishop in Canada at the time of his retirement. He was also the last living bishop who had attended all sessions of the Second Vatican Council. He was notable for his advocacy of social justice and for making investments that impacted diocesan finances.

== Early life ==
De Roo was born in Swan Lake, Manitoba, on February 24, 1924. He was the second of eight or nine children; his sister became a Ursuline nun and his younger brother also became a priest. His first language was Flemish. De Roo attended seminary at St. Boniface seminary in Winnipeg starting when he was 15 years old. On June 8, 1950, he was ordained to the Catholic priesthood in his hometown. He subsequently undertook postgraduate studies at the Pontifical University of Saint Thomas Aquinas in Rome, obtaining a Doctor of Sacred Theology degree in 1952.

== Presbyteral ministry ==
De Roo's first pastoral assignment was as assistant parish priest at Holy Cross Parish in Winnipeg's Norwood neighbourhood shortly after his ordination. He then became diocesan director of Catholic Action the following year, before serving as vice-chancellor of the Archdiocese of Saint Boniface and secretary to Maurice Baudoux. He eventually became parish priest at Holy Cross in 1960, his final position before becoming bishop in 1962. He ultimately served as a priest in Saint Boniface for 12 years.

== Episcopal ministry ==
De Roo was appointed as the thirteenth Bishop of Victoria on October 29, 1962. The see had been vacant since March that year, when James Michael Hill died. He was consecrated bishop on December 14, 1962, at Saint Boniface Cathedral in Winnipeg, with Maurice Baudoux serving as the principal consecrator. He was installed in Victoria six days later on December 20. He was the youngest Catholic bishop at the time, as well as the first Bishop of Victoria born in Western Canada. He was also the youngest Catholic bishop in modern history when he was appointed.

During his tenure as diocesan bishop, De Roo was known as a strong proponent of activism and liberation theology and was a critic of capitalism. He was the main force behind the 1983 Canadian bishops' statement "Ethical Reflections on the Economic Crisis". That document stated that the "goal of serving the human needs of all people in our society must take precedence over the maximization of profits and growth"" He also supported the ordination of women and married priests. His decision to broach the latter subject during a lunch with Pope John Paul II and other bishops in 1994 drew the ire of the pope, while his address to a conference in the US calling for a dialogue about the former resulted in De Roo being summoned to Rome in 1986 and reprimanded by Joseph Ratzinger, the prefect of the Congregation for the Doctrine of the Faith at the time. De Roo co-wrote the book In the Eye of the Catholic Storm with a former nun in 1992. The decision by Catholic newspapers in the nearby Archdiocese of Vancouver (The B.C. Catholic) as well as Toronto (The Catholic Register) not to run ads promoting the book made national headlines, underscoring the friction between conservative and liberal Catholics. Around the time of his retirement, he intended to address an international convention of married Catholic priests in Atlanta. However, he ultimately backed out after the Vatican told him not to proceed.

De Roo was at the centre of a financial scandal that left his diocese nearly bankrupt. Over a 15-year period, despite being a critic of capitalism he made a series of large investments in real estate and in a horse-breeding ranch without adhering to canonical requirements for consent from the Vatican, consultation with diocesan clergy, or financial record-keeping. When the ventures failed the diocese was left with a debt of over $17 million. De Roo was not accused of fraud but did not obtain Vatican approval for any of these transactions. Vatican approval is required for transactions over $3.5 million. In May 2000, De Roo issued an apology to all Catholics in his former diocese which was printed in parish bulletins. In the apology he wrote that "I am truly sorry and beg your forgiveness." The diocese sold off assets and issued bonds to clear the debt.

The diocese eventually sold the land it owned in Washington state in November 2006. This allowed it to pay off its debts completely, including to the many parishioners who had purchased bonds. De Roo was ultimately cleared of any wrongdoing by a jury in the civil action, which determined that he had actually made a sound investment.

=== Second Vatican Council ===
De Roo attended all four sessions of Vatican II and was the last living bishop who had attended the council. This experience deeply affected him and he referred to himself as "a pilgrim of the Second Vatican Council". He described attending the sessions as "a voyage of discovery that would radically alter my whole outlook on reality" and "it was indeed a time of euphoria". After his retirement, De Roo continued to travel and lecture about Vatican II and gave the keynote address, "Rebuild My Church – A Vatican Council Father Shares an Inspired Vision", at a Call to Action conference in 2008.

== Later life ==
After 37 years as Bishop of Victoria, De Roo reached the mandatory retirement age of 75 in February 1999. His resignation was accepted by Pope John Paul II less than one month later on March 11. He was the longest serving Canadian bishop at the time of his retirement. He subsequently remained on Vancouver Island and retired near to Nanaimo. De Roo continued to give lectures and minister into his nineties. He was also an Enneagram of Personality teacher and co-authored a book on the subject in 2002.

De Roo died on February 1, 2022, at the Mount St. Mary's nursing home in Victoria. He was 97 years old. He was the last surviving bishop to have participated in the Second Vatican Council.
