= Thomas Joseph Lobsinger =

Canadian Catholic bishop

Thomas Joseph Lobsinger OMI
- Bishop of Whitehorse
- Church: Catholic Church
- Diocese: Diocese of Whitehorse
- In office: 3 July 1987 – 15 April 2000
- Predecessor: Hubert O'Connor
- Successor: Gary Gordon

Orders
- Ordination: 29 May 1954
- Consecration: 1 October 1987 by Hubert O'Connor

Personal details
- Born: 17 November 1927 Ayton, Ontario, Dominion of Canada, British Empire
- Died: 15 April 2000 (aged 72) near Whitehorse, Yukon, Canada

Thomas Joseph Lobsinger (17 November 1927 – April 15 2000) was a Canadian clergyman and bishop for the Roman Catholic Diocese of Whitehorse. He was ordained in 1954. He was appointed in 1987. Bishop Lobsinger died on 15 April 2000, when the small plane he was piloting crashed into a frozen lake near Whitehorse, Yukon.
