= St. Patrick's Elementary School =

Location
- 2368 Trent St. Victoria, British Columbia, V8R 4Z3; Canada; 48.4336°N 123.3242°W

Information
- School type: Independent
- Motto: Ora Et Labora (Pray and Work)
- Religious affiliation: Roman Catholic
- Founded: 1956
- School board: CISDV - Catholic Independent Schools of the Diocese of Victoria
- Superintendent: Beverly Pulyk
- Area trustee: (Bishop's Representative)
- Principal: Patrick Card
- Grades: K-7
- Enrollment: 285+ (co-ed)
- Language: English
- Area: Oak Bay
- Colours: Green and gold
- Mascot: Patrick the leprechaun
- Team name: Fighting Irish
- Website: www.stpatrickselem.ca

St. Patrick's, an independent co-educational Catholic elementary school of approximately 315 Grade K-7 students in Greater Victoria, British Columbia, Canada.

== History ==
The school was established in 1956 by Father M. J. McNamara. In January of that year St. Patrick's School opened on Haultain Street with 4 classrooms and 50 pupils. In the late spring of 1956 the school moved to its present location. Sister Mary Edmunda was the first principal, and she remained at the school until 1961. In that same year a new gymnasium was added to the facilities.

In 1962 the school accepted students up to Grade 9 - the enrolment being approximately 450 students. In 1965 Sister Norah Keane was appointed principal and held the position for 14 years. Partial aid was granted to the school in 1977, and the school came under the auspices of the Ministry of Education.

== Independent school status ==
St. Patrick's Elementary School is classified as a Group 1 school under British Columbia's Independent School Act. It receives 50% funding from the Ministry of Education. The school receives no funding for capital costs. It is under charge of the Catholic Independent Schools of the Roman Catholic Diocese of Victoria.

=== Academic departments ===
- Mathematics
- Performing Arts
- Social Studies
- Catholic theology
- English
- Humanities
- Information technologies
- Languages
- Science
- Physical Education
- Visual Arts

== Athletic performance ==
=== School teams ===
- Soccer
- Volleyball
- Track & Field
- Basketball
- Cross Country
- T.H.A.S.T. (Thursday afternoon sports training every week in the spring with a variety of sports to choose from ranging from Rock Climbing to Sailing)
- Badminton
- Mountain Biking
- Swimming

== Artistic performance ==
=== Performing arts ===
- Drama
- Concert Choir
- Concert Band

=== Visual arts ===
- Art
- Photography
