= Charles John Seghers =

Catholic missionary and bishop (1839-1886)

The Most Reverend Charles John Seghers
- Bishop of Vancouver Island
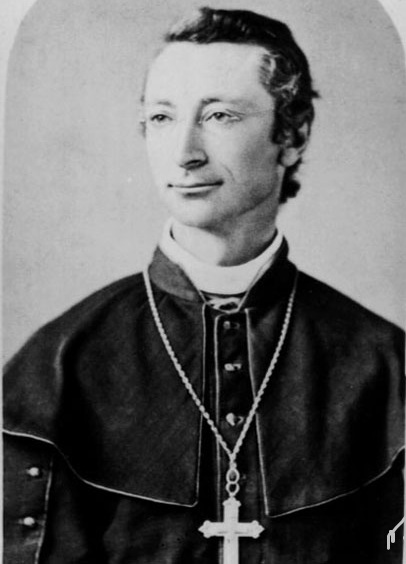
- Church: Catholic Church
- Diocese: Vancouver Island
- Appointed: 6 March 1884
- Term ended: 28 November 1886
- Predecessor: Jean-Baptiste Brondel
- Successor: Jean-Nicolas Lemmens
- Previous posts: Archbishop of Oregon City (1880–1884); Coadjutor Archbishop of Oregon City (1878–1880); Bishop of Vancouver Island (1873–1878)

Orders
- Ordination: 31 May 1863 by Engelbert Sterckx
- Consecration: 29 June 1873 by François Norbert Blanchet

Personal details
- Born: 26 December 1839 Ghent, Belgium
- Died: 28 November 1886 (aged 46) Near Nulato, District of Alaska, U.S.
- Cause of death: Murder by gunshot
- Coat of arms

Charles John Seghers (26 December 1839 – 28 November 1886) was a Belgian prelate of the Catholic Church. He was the second and fourth Bishop of Vancouver Island, serving from 1873 to 1878 and from 1884 until his murder in 1886. He also served as Archbishop of Oregon City from 1880 to 1884.

Born in Ghent, Seghers spent most of his career as a missionary in British Columbia and Alaska. On 28 November 1886, while on an expedition near Nulato, he was shot and killed by Francis Fuller, one of his companions.

== Early life and education ==
Charles John Seghers was born on 26 December 1839 in Ghent. He was the youngest son of Charles Francis and Pauline Seghers. He was orphaned by the age of eighteen, losing his parents and siblings to tuberculosis.

Seghers received his early education at Sint-Barbaracollege, a Jesuit school in Ghent. In 1858, he entered the Major Seminary of Ghent to study for the priesthood. On 9 August 1862, the same day that he was ordained a deacon, he entered the American College in Leuven to train as a missionary for North America. Answering an appeal from Bishop Modeste Demers, Seghers attached himself to the Diocese of Vancouver Island.

== Priesthood ==
Seghers was ordained a priest on 31 May 1863 by Cardinal Engelbert Sterckx at St. Rumbold's Cathedral in Mechelen. He sailed from Belgium on the following 14 September, and arrived at Victoria, British Columbia, on 17 November.

In Victoria, Bishop Demers appointed Seghers to serve as rector of St. Andrew's Cathedral and chaplain to the Sisters of Saint Anne. He also engaged in missionary work among Indigenous people and white settlers, making visits to remote communities in Chemainus and Nanaimo.

Seghers began to have health problems, suffering his first of many pulmonary hemorrhages in December 1867. His illness became so severe that he feared he would die, writing in May 1868, "I am ready to go if it is God's Holy Will..." He briefly stayed with his friend, Father Jean-Baptiste Brondel, in Steilacoom, Washington, where his health began to recover.

From 1869 to 1870, Seghers served as a peritus to Bishop Demers at the First Vatican Council in Rome. Demers and Seghers had a private audience with Pope Pius IX in April 1870. During the audience, the pope compared the blood from Seghers' hemorrhages to the red worn by cardinals, jokingly saying, "You must not encroach upon my privilege of making cardinals."

Shortly after returning from the council, both Demers and Seghers' health began to decline; the bishop suffered a stroke in December 1870, while the priest's hemorrhages recurred. Demers sent a letter to the pope, asking for his prayers for Seghers' health. After receiving a reply from Cardinal Alessandro Barnabò, in which he relayed the pope's apostolic blessing, Seghers allegedly never had another hemorrhage. However, Demers himself died in July 1871.

== Episcopal career ==
=== Bishop of Vancouver Island ===
On 11 March 1873, Seghers was appointed by Pius IX to succeed Demers as the second Bishop of Vancouver Island. He received his episcopal consecration on the following 29 June from Archbishop François Norbert Blanchet at St. Andrew's Cathedral, with Bishops Augustin-Magloire Blanchet and Louis-Joseph d'Herbomez serving as co-consecrators. At the age of 33, he was the youngest Catholic bishop in North America.

In July 1873, shortly after his consecration, Seghers made his first trip to Alaska—traveling from Sitka to Kodiak and Unalaska over the course of two months. In April 1874, he visited the west coast of Vancouver Island, baptizing nearly a thousand children. In July 1877, he returned to Alaska for a 14-month missionary tour along the Yukon River, traveling from St. Michael to Nulato.

=== Archbishop of Oregon City ===
When Seghers returned from Alaska in September 1878, he learned that Pope Leo XIII had appointed him on 23 July as coadjutor archbishop with the right of succession to Archbishop Blanchet (who had consecrated Seghers as a bishop) of the Archdiocese of Oregon City. The pope also gave him the honorary position of titular archbishop of Hemesa.

After organizing his affairs on Vancouver Island, Seghers arrived in Portland in July 1879. He immediately began a 16-month tour of the archdiocese, traveling 5,000 miles and administering confirmation to 800 people. When the Holy See accepted Archbishop Blanchet's retirement on December 12, 1880, Seghers automatically succeeded him as the second Archbishop of Oregon City.

=== Return to Vancouver Island ===
As Archbishop of Oregon City, Seghers traveled to Rome in the fall of 1883 with other American bishops to secure the pope's approval to hold the third Plenary Council of Baltimore. Meanwhile, Bishop Jean-Baptiste Brondel, Seghers' successor in Vancouver Island, had been transferred to the Diocese of Helena and there was difficulty finding a replacement. While in Rome, Seghers therefore had an audience with Leo XIII and volunteered to resign his post in Oregon and return to his old diocese. This proposal was accepted, and on 6 March 1884, the pope reappointed him to Vancouver Island with the personal title of archbishop.

Seghers attended the third Plenary Council of Baltimore from November to December 1884. At the council, he delivered an address on "Indian Missions," in which he recounted his missionary work and appealed for his fellow bishops to support such efforts. The council then established the Commission for the Catholic Missions among the Colored People and the Indians to raise funds for missionary work.

== Death ==
"The Official Account of the Death of Archbishop Seghers"
1893
Read by Phil Schempf for LibriVox
Audio 00:08:57 (full text)

On 13 July 1886, Seghers began a journey to establish a Catholic mission in Interior Alaska—accompanied by two Jesuits, Fathers Pascal Tosi and Aloysius Robaut, and one layman, Francis Fuller. When the party arrived in Juneau, they hired a French Canadian guide named Antoine Provost. Fuller began to show signs of mental instability, but Seghers rejected Tosi's attempt to fire him. On 27 July, as the party was traveling toward the Yukon River through the Chilkoot Pass, Provost disappeared and the others were unable to find him.

On 7 September, the party reached the Stewart River. While there, they learned from trader Arthur Harper that Rev. Octavius Parker, an Episcopalian missionary, was planning to start a school at Nulato. The party then split, with the two Jesuits remaining at Stewart River while Seghers and Fuller left for Nulato, accompanied by two Indigenous guides. On 4 October, the party reached Noochuloghoyet, where they had to remain for six weeks, waiting for the waterways to freeze solid enough to bear the weight of a dog sled. During this time, Seghers recorded in his diary: "Peculiar conversation with [Fuller] in which for the third time he gives evidence of his insanity."

On 19 November, the party resumed their journey. During this time, Seghers wrote that Fuller had accused him of "[encouraging] the Indians to make fun of him" and had predicted Seghers "would give him a bad name." On 27 November, the party encamped at a site approximately 30 miles from Nulato. Early the next morning, as the party prepared for the final leg of their journey, Fuller fired a single shot that killed Seghers instantly. When asked for his motive, Fuller simply replied, "Oh, I did; that's all. I have taken the Bishop's life, and mine will be short now." In December 1887, he was convicted of manslaughter and sentenced by Judge Lafayette Dawson to ten years of hard labor.

Seghers was initially buried at St. Michael. In 1888, his remains were transported by the USS Thetis to Victoria. There, his body was interred in the crypt of St. Andrew's Cathedral.

== Sources ==
- Steckler, Gerard G. (1986). Charles John Seghers: Priest and Bishop in the Pacific Northwest, 1839-1886. Ye Galleon Press.
- de Baets, Maurice (1894). Vie de Monseigneur Seghers [The Apostle of Alaska: Life of the Most Reverend Charles John Seghers]. Translated by Sister Mary Mildred, SSA. Patterson, NJ: St. Anthony Guild Press.
- Steckler, Gerard G. (1968). "The Case of Frank Fuller: The Killer of Alaska Missionary Charles Seghers". The Pacific Northwest Quarterly. 59.

Catholic Church titles
Preceded by François Norbert Blanchet	Archbishop of Oregon City; 1880–1884	Succeeded by William Hickley Gross
