= St. Patrick Regional Secondary School =

Saint Patrick Regional Secondary School

Location
- 115 East 11th Ave. Vancouver, British Columbia, V5T 2C1; Canada; 49.2614°N 123.1025°W

Information
- School type: Independent
- Motto: "Volens Et Valens" (Ready and Willing)
- Religious affiliation: Roman Catholic
- Founded: 1923
- School board: CISVA (Catholic Independent Schools of the Vancouver Archdiocese)
- Superintendent: Sandra Marshall
- Area trustee: Rev. Ronald Thompson (Archbishop's Representative)
- Principal: Ralph Gabriele
- Grades: 8–12
- Enrollment: 500
- Language: English
- Area: Mount Pleasant
- Colours: Green and White
- Team name: Celtics
- Website: www.stpats.bc.ca

St. Patrick Regional Secondary School (St. Pat's) is an independent Catholic school in Vancouver, under the administration of the CISVA (Catholic Independent Schools of the Vancouver Archdiocese) school board.

The school is co-educational which offers academic, fine arts, and business programs, as well as athletic, performing arts, and other extracurricular programs, for students from grades 8 to 12.

The school participates in sporting events under the name of the "Celtics", with the team colours of Green and White.

== History ==
Monsignor Forget is the founder of St. Patrick Regional Secondary School, in 1923, in Vancouver, British Columbia, Canada. It was established by the Catholic Independent School Society of Vancouver Archdiocese to serve the educational needs of its twenty-three designated parishes.

== Independent school status ==
St. Patrick Regional Secondary School is classified as a Group 1 school under British Columbia's Independent School Act. It receives 50% funding from the Ministry of Education. The school receives no funding for capital costs. It is under charge of the Roman Catholic Archdiocese of Vancouver.

Feeder Parishes

- St. Andrews
- St. Joseph's (Vancouver)
- St. Patrick's
- St. Francis Xavier
- St. Paul's (Richmond)
- St. Casimir's
- Sacred Heart
- St. Augustine's
- St. Joseph the Worker
- Immaculate Conception
- Blessed Sacrament
- Holy Family
- Holy Name
- Our Lady of Perpetual Help
- Our Lady of Fatima
- St. Anthony of Padua
- Guardian Angels

== Academic performance ==
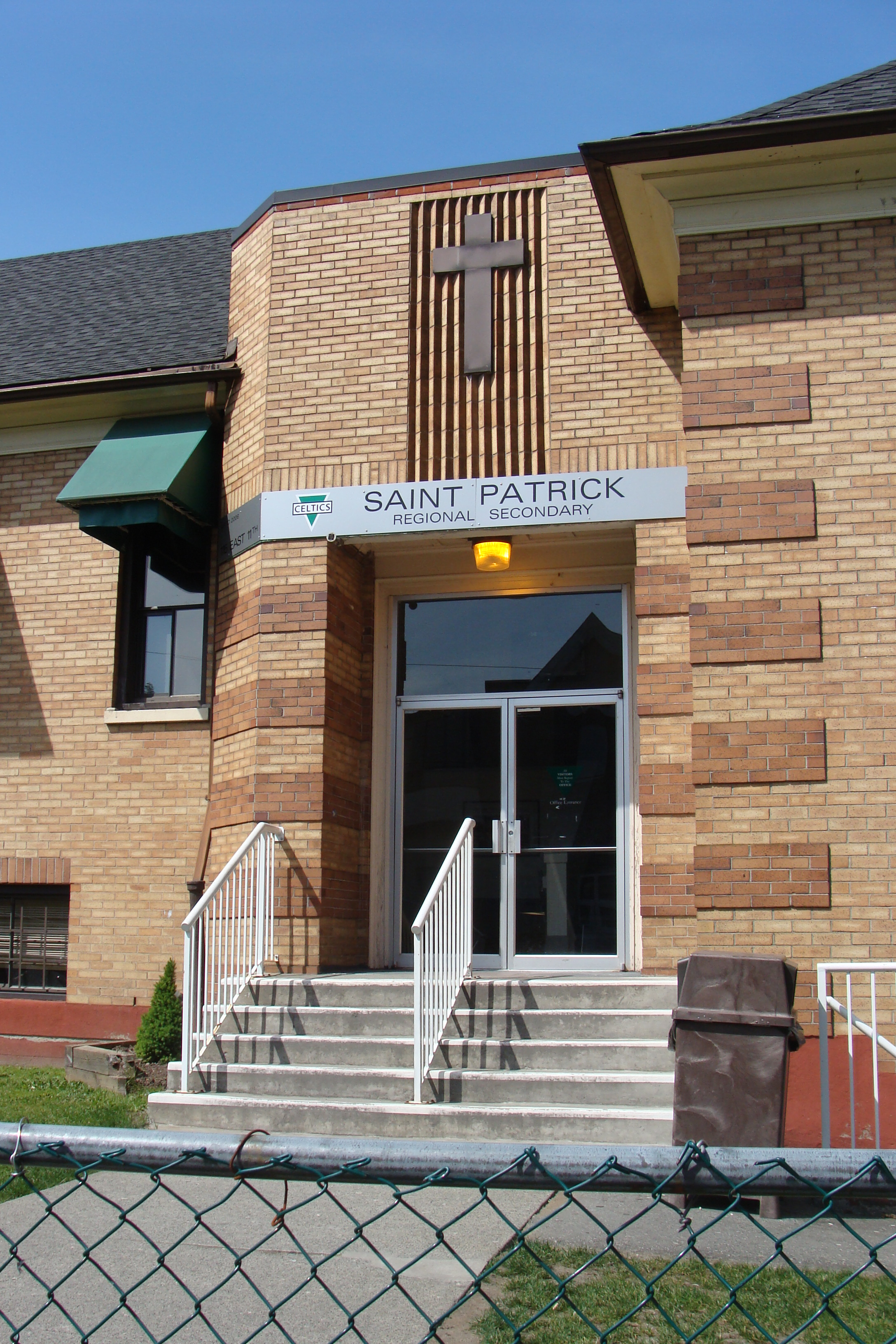
Entrance to the high school

St. Pat's is ranked by the Fraser Institute. In 2008, it was ranked 74th out of 316 Vancouver, lower mainland schools.

Academic Departments

- Business
- Mathematics
- Performing Arts
- Social Studies
- Catholic theology
- English
- Humanities
- Information Technology
- Languages
- Science
- Physical Education
- Visual Arts

== Athletic performance ==
The outdoor mural on St. Pat's Gym.

Both the Varsity Boys & Girls basketball teams participate in the BC Catholic Basketball Championship, the largest tournament in the province of BC.

The Senior Girls Volleyball of 2001–2002, 2002–2003, and 2008–2009 teams won first place at the Provincial Championships.

In 2010, the Senior Boys Basketball team won 'A' Provincial Championships. In 2020, the Junior Boys Basketball team won the Provincial Championships after defeating the Sir Winston Churchill Bulldogs, following a game-winning three-pointer by Irish Coquia. In 2022, the Junior Boys again made the tournament's final four, ultimately placing 3rd after entering the tournament as the 23rd seed.

In 2022, the Senior Boys Basketball Team won the 'AAA' Provincial Championships after defeating the Elgin Park Orcas 56-52 in the provincial final as the top seed. The following year, the team became back-to-back champions after defeating the Dover Bay Dolphins 91-80 in the provincial final. In 2024, the team attempted to win their third consecutive provincial championship as the top seed for the third year in a row but was upset by the fifth-seeded MEI Eagles in the provincial semi-final by four points.

School Teams
Soccer
Volleyball
Track & Field
Basketball
Wrestling
Badminton
Ultimate (sport)

== Artistic performance ==
St. Patrick Regional Secondary provides students with a variety of performing & non-performing arts.

A majority of the school's student body are involved with the school's choral performance program. With nearly 50% of the school population participating in choir each year, the choral program has grown to eight different ensembles, led by conductor Tony Araujo and artist in residence Gerda Blok-Wilson. The hard work of the students involved in the school's Concert choir and Chamber choir, consisting of students in Grade 10 to 12, is recognized and celebrated at the school's Spirit Alive Gala Choir Concert, held annually at the Chan Centre for the Performing Arts.

Students in the Chamber choir, the school's audition-based choral ensemble have travelled to Chicago and Los Angeles to compete in the "Festival of Gold" US National Choral Invitational. In addition to travelling to the United States of America, the Chamber choir has travelled to Portugal to host and perform at concerts. In addition, the Choirs have been invited to perform at international conferences and festivals throughout North America, Europe and Asia, including concerts at the Kennedy Center for the Performing Arts in Washington, DC, Canterbury Cathedral, Carnegie Hall in New York City and the United Nations. Songs sung cover a wide range of genres, from traditional religious choral music to folk, pop, classical and more, including a rendition of Northwest Passage written by Stan Rogers.

Performing Arts	Visual Arts
Drama	Art
Band	Photography
Show Choir	Stage Props
Concert Choir	Yearbook
Music
Dance squad

== Notable alumni ==
• Finn Wolfhard, Actor

• Ethan Ogrodniczuk, Cyclist

• Madeleine Thien, Author

• Yonah Martin, Canadian Senator
