= Canadian Catholic News =

Canadian Catholic News (CCN) is a co-operative news service serving Catholic media across Canada, bringing together the efforts of Catholic newspapers, radio and television across Canada. Its goal is to provide an accurate, dependable coast-to-coast picture of the Catholic Church in action.

CCN also offers online courses and seminars to promote Catholic journalism.

== History ==
Canadian Catholic News was founded out of the need for Catholic news media to share reporting to have comprehensive coverage of the visit of Pope John Paul II to Canada in 1984. The first formal meeting of Catholic news organisations took place in May 1984. It included editors and representatives from the Prairie Messenger, The B.C. Catholic, the Montreal Catholic Times, Catholic New Times, The Catholic Register, and the Western Catholic Reporter. Following meetings took place, and Canadian Catholic News was founded on May 26, 1988, with six members. Andrew Britz and Eric Durocher were the co-operative's fist co-chairmen.

== Members ==
- The B.C. Catholic
- The Catholic Register
- Catholic Conscience
- Grandin Media formerly Western Catholic Reporter
- Prairie Messenger
- Catholic New Times
- The Catholic Times
- The New Freeman
- The Atlantic Catholic
- Le Verbe Magazine
