= Raymond Roussin =

The Most Reverend Raymond Roussin SM
- Archbishop of Vancouver
- Province: British Columbia
- See: Vancouver
- Installed: 2004
- Term ended: 2009
- Predecessor: Adam Exner
- Successor: J. Michael Miller
- Previous posts: Provincial Superior Society of Mary (Marianists) (1980–1986); Bishop of Gravelbourg (1995–1999); Bishop of Victoria (1999–2004)

Orders
- Ordination: March 21, 1970
- Consecration: June 14, 1995

Personal details
- Born: Raymond Roussin; June 17, 1939 St. Vital, Winnipeg, Manitoba, Canada
- Died: April 24, 2015 (aged 75) Winnipeg, Manitoba, Canada
- Denomination: Roman Catholic
- Education: St. Mary's University in San Antonio, Texas; University of Manitoba; St. Louis University; University of Fribourg, Switzerland
- Motto: Fortes in Fide (English: Steadfast in Faith)
- Coat of arms: Raymond Roussin's coat of arms

Styles of Raymond Roussin
- Reference style: The Most Reverend
- Spoken style: Your Excellency
- Religious style: Your Excellency

Ordination history of Raymond Roussin
History
Episcopal consecration
- Principal consecrator: Noël Delaquis
- Co-consecrators: Antoine Hacault; Paul Vollmar
Episcopal succession
Bishops consecrated by Raymond Roussin as principal consecrator
- Richard Gagnon: July 20, 2004
- Gary Gordon: March 22, 2006

Raymond O. Roussin SM was a Canadian prelate who served as the Archbishop of the Roman Catholic Archdiocese of Vancouver from 2004 to January 2009, when his resignation was accepted by Pope Benedict XVI.

== Curriculum vitae ==
Roussin was born on June 17, 1939, in St. Boniface, Winnipeg, Manitoba.

=== Religious Life and Priesthood ===
He entered the religious institute of the Society of Mary in 1961 in St. Louis, Missouri. He taught at the Marianists' Chaminade College Preparatory School in St. Louis from 1960 to 1963, and in St. Anselme, Quebec, from 1963 to 1965. He did pre-seminary studies at Saint Louis University before enrolling at the University of Fribourg in Fribourg, Switzerland.He was ordained as a priest for the Marianists on March 21, 1970 in Fribourg shortly before completing his Licentiate in Sacred Theology.

He served as the Director of the Marianist community in Saint Boniface, 1971-1979 and 1987-1995, as well as Provincial Superior for the Marianists in Canada, 1980-1987. In the Archdiocese of Saint Boniface, he served as the Director of Vocations, member of the Presbyteral Council, and Director of Saint Boniface Diocesan High School. He also served as a Member of the Presbyteral Council of the Archdiocese of Winnipeg. From 1984 to 1986, he was President of the Western Conference of Religious.

=== Consecration ===
In 1995, Roussin was appointed by Pope John Paul II as Bishop of Gravelbourg and in 1999, as Bishop of Victoria. Raymond Roussin was appointed Archbishop of Vancouver on January 10, 2004.

Roussin served as Vice President of the Assembly of Western Catholic Bishops and on the CCCB Permanent Council (1997-1999), as well as a member of the former Commission for Christian Education of the French Sector (1995-1999) and of its former Commission for Liturgy (1999-2003). He was also the CCCB liaison Bishop with Canadian Catholic Campus Ministry. In 1999, he was named by Pope John Paul II to participate in the European Synod of Bishops in Rome.

His request for early retirement (for reasons of health since he had been suffering from depression) was accepted by Pope Benedict XVI on January 2, 2009. He was open with his depression long before his resignation which is unusual for bishops and other high churchmen. Psychologists lauded his coming forward as heroic.

== Legacy ==
Due to the declining Catholic population in the Diocese of Gravelbourg, Saskatchewan, Roussin was entrusted with dissolving the Diocese in 1995. On September 14, 1998, the Diocese reverted to the Archdiocese of Regina and the Diocese of Saskatoon.

In 1998, Roussin became Bishop of Victoria in British Columbia. Because earlier questionable investments left the Diocese in financial trouble, Raymond Roussin reorganized its finances by selling off unused property and brought the situation under control.

In February 2007, Archbishop Roussin called for pornography-free mobile service. The call was for Catholics & non-Catholics to divest from Telus Mobility and to write to the Canadian Radio-television and Telecommunications Commission to stop downloading of pornography onto cell phones. Roussin's call, whose story drew the attention of The New York Times and Bloomberg News, was key to Telus dropping its adult content offerings.

On July 7, 2008, James Wingle, Bishop of St. Catharines, and Roussin spoke out strongly against the decision to grant Dr. Henry Morgentaler the Order of Canada, and called for this award to be revoked.

On September 5, 2008, Roussin asked for support of Bill C-484, which would help protect the unborn as victims of crime. Presently, if a pregnant woman is attacked, and her unborn child is killed, the attacker is not charged with the murder of the child.

On January 2, 2009, he was succeeded by J. Michael Miller. Miller also succeeded Roussin as Grand Prior of the Canada-Vancouver Lieutenancy of the Equestrian Order of the Holy Sepulchre of Jerusalem.

On April 24, 2015, he died in Winnipeg.

Catholic Church titles
Preceded by Noël Delaquis	Bishop of Gravelbourg; 1995–1998	Diocese dissolved
Preceded by Remi De Roo	Bishop of Victoria; 1998–2004	Succeeded by Richard Gagnon
Preceded by Adam Exner	Archbishop of Vancouver; 2004–2009	Succeeded by J. Michael Miller
