= James M. Hill =

Roman Catholic bishop (1899–1962)

- Diocese: Victoria
- Installed: 1946
- Term ended: 1962
- Predecessor: John Christopher Cody
- Successor: Remi Joseph De Roo

Orders
- Ordination: 1923
- Consecration: 1945
- Rank: Bishop

Personal details
- Born: October 12, 1899 or October 28, 1899 Upper Bay du Vin, New Brunswick
- Died: March 29, 1962 (aged 62) Victoria, British Columbia
- Denomination: Roman Catholic
- Occupation: Teacher, university administrator, priest, bishop
- Profession: Teacher, priest
- Education: St. Thomas College, Laval University

James Michael Hill (also James McDool Hill; October 12, 1899 – March 3, 1962) was a bishop of the Roman Catholic Diocese of Victoria, British Columbia, Canada and first president of St. Thomas College.

The son of James S. Hill and Margaret Parris Fitzpatrick, James M. Hill was born in Upper Bay du Vin, New Brunswick. His date of birth is shown in provincial government birth records as October 28, 1899, however, it is otherwise shown as October 12, 1899. His birth or baptismal name is recorded as James McDool Hill, however, other documents including the official record of death state James Michael Hill.

Hill's father was a building contractor in Chatham. Hill received his early education in Chatham and later attended St. Thomas College in the same town where he was an outstanding student. He received theological training at Université Laval and was ordained in 1923.

Upon returning to Chatham at age 24, Hill was appointed to the faculty of St. Thomas College where he served as teacher (1923-1927), acting rector (1927-1929), and rector-president (1929-1945). St. Thomas College attained degree-granting status in 1934 while Hill was rector; as a result, the office of rector was superseded by the office of president and Hill became the college's first president. Enrollment at St. Thomas College grew from 185 students in 1937 to 289 in 1944.

Hill received an honorary Doctor of Divinity degree from Université Laval in 1937. Hill was an extensive promoter of the community-based cooperative movement in the Maritimes through the work of Reverend Moses M. Coady, head of the extension department of St. Francis Xavier University. In 1939 Hill was appointed president of the Northumberland County Credit Union.

Hill resigned as president of St. Thomas College in 1945 and became the first priest of St. Thomas Aquinas parish in Campbellton under the Diocese of Bathurst. The following year in 1946, Hill was consecrated as Bishop of Victoria in British Columbia. He exuded great energy but was always "a very gentle and gracious soul." In 1960 his alma mater St. Thomas College had its name changed by the provincial government to St. Thomas University; that same year, St. Thomas University honoured Hill with an honorary Doctor of Law degree. He died in 1962 at age 62.

His name is honored in Chatham by the James M. Hill Memorial High School.

Catholic Church titles
Preceded by John Christopher Cody	Bishop of Victoria; 1946 – 1962	Succeeded by Remi Joseph De Roo
