= Diocese of Victoria in Canada =

Catholic ecclesiastical territory

Coordinates: 48.4167°N 123.3500°W

Diocese of Victoria Dioecesis Victoriensis in Insula Vancouver
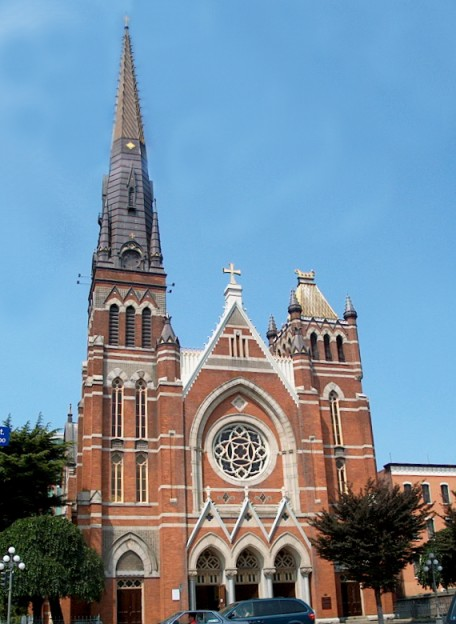
- St. Andrew's Cathedral, Victoria, BC, Canada

Location
- Country: Canada
- Ecclesiastical province: Archdiocese of Vancouver

Statistics
- Area: 95,275 km^{2} (36,786 sq mi)
- Population: 96,000 (13.6%)

Information
- Denomination: Catholic Church
- Sui iuris church: Latin Church
- Rite: Roman Rite
- Established: July 24, 1846
- Cathedral: St Andrew's Cathedral

Current leadership
- Pope: Leo XIV
- Bishop: Gary Gordon
- Metropolitan Archbishop: Richard W. Smith; Archbishop of Vancouver

Website
- rcdvictoria.org

The Diocese of Victoria (Latin: Dioecesis Victoriensis in Insula Vancouver) is a Latin Church ecclesiastical territory or diocese of the Catholic Church in the Canadian province of British Columbia. Its episcopal see is in Victoria. The diocese encompasses all of Vancouver Island and several nearby British Columbia islands. A suffragan diocese in the ecclesiastical province of the metropolitan Archdiocese of Vancouver, the diocese's cathedral is St. Andrew's Cathedral and its present diocesan bishop is Gary Gordon.

This is the oldest Canadian diocese west of Toronto.

== History ==
When the American expedition of 1810 entered the Willamette Valley of present-day Oregon, it included 13 French-Canadian Catholics. Several of them, including the fur trader Étienne Lucier, decided to settle there. In 1836, Lucier and 15 other Catholic settlers petitioned Auxiliary Bishop Norbert Provencher, head of the church in present-day Manitoba, to send a priest to their settlement. They constructed St. Paul's Church, the oldest church in Oregon, in St. Paul, Oregon that same year. In 1838, he sent the missionary priests François Norbert Blanchet and Modeste Demers, who had been instructed by Archbishop Joseph Signay of Quebec: "In order to make yourselves sooner useful to the natives... you will apply yourselves... to the study of the Indian languages... so as to be able to publish a grammar after some of your residence there."

The Diocese of Vancouver Island was erected on 24 July 1846, being one of three dioceses in the Pacific Northwest created out of the Vicariate Apostolic of the Oregon Territory, although the population of Catholics there was "a mere handful." Modeste Demers became the new diocese's first bishop. The territory included Vancouver Island, the Gulf Islands, New Caledonia (mainland British Columbia), and the Queen Charlotte Islands. When the United States purchased Alaska in 1867 from the Empire of Russia, it came under the jurisdiction of the Diocese.

The Diocese of Vancouver Island was elevated to an archdiocese on 19 June 1903 and then renamed Archdiocese of Victoria in 1904. During the period 1846–1903, it was under the influence of the Archdiocese of Portland in Oregon, which either directly appointed or had considerable influence over the appointment of the bishops of Vancouver Island.

The Archdiocese of Victoria was lowered to the status of a diocese in 1908, when the metropolitan see was moved to Vancouver.

Territorial losses

Year	territory lost to form:
1863	Vicariate Apostolic of British Columbia
1894	Prefecture Apostolic of Alaska

== Bishops ==
The following are the lists of Bishops and their years of service:

=== Ordinaries ===
==== Bishop of Vancouver Island ====
- Modeste Demers (1846–1871)
- Charles-Jean Seghers (1873–1878), appointed Coadjutor Archbishop of Oregon City, Oregon, USA; returned here in 1884
- Jean-Baptiste Brondel (1879–1883)
- Charles-Jean Seghers (1884–1886); personal title of Archbishop
- Jean-Nicolas Lemmens (1888–1897)
- Alexander Christie (1898–1899), appointed Archbishop of Oregon City, Oregon, USA
- Bertram Orth (1900–1903)

==== Archbishop of Vancouver Island ====
- Bertram Orth (1903–1904), see above

==== Archbishop/Bishop of Victoria ====
- Bertram Orth (1904–1908), see above
- Alexander MacDonald (1908–1923)
- Thomas O'Donnell (1923–1929), appointed Coadjutor Archbishop of Halifax, Nova Scotia
- Gerald C. Murray, C.SS.R. (1930–1934), appointed Bishop of Saskatoon, Saskatchewan
- John Hugh MacDonald (1934–1936), appointed Coadjutor Archbishop of Edmonton, Alberta
- John Christopher Cody (1936–1946), appointed Coadjutor Bishop of London, Ontario
- James Michael Hill (1946–1962)
- Remi Joseph De Roo (1962–1999)
- Raymond Roussin, S.M. (1999–2004), appointed Archbishop of Vancouver, British Columbia
- Richard Gagnon (2004–2014), appointed Archbishop of Winnipeg
- Gary Gordon (2014–present)

=== Coadjutor bishops ===
- John James Jonckau (1883); did not take effect
- Raymond Olir Roussin, S. M. (1998-1999)

=== Auxiliary bishop ===
- Louis Aloysius Lootens (1876-1898)

== Churches ==
Greater Victoria

- St Andrew's Cathedral
- Holy Cross
- Our Lady of Fatima (Portuguese)
- Our Lady of the Rosary
- Our Lady Queen Of Peace
- Saanich Peninsula Parish
- Sacred Heart
- St-Jean-Baptiste (French)
- St. Joseph the Worker
- St. Leopold Mandic (Croatian)
- St. Patrick's
- St. Rose of Lima

Courtenay

- Christ The King

Campbell River

- St. Patrick's

Gold River

- St. Peter and St. Paul

Hornby Island

- Holy Cross

Chemainus

- St. Joseph's

Duncan

- St. Ann's
- St. Edward the Confessor

Lake Cowichan

- St. Louis De Montfort

Ladysmith

- St. Mary's

Gabriola Island

- Our Lady of Victory Mission

Mayne Island

- St. Francis of Assisi

Pender Island

- St. Teresa's Chapel

Salt Spring Island

- Our Lady of Grace

Mill Bay

- St Francis Xavier

Shawnigan Lake

- Our Lady Queen of the World

Nanaimo

- St. Peter's
- Trinity Catholic

Parksville

- Church of the Ascension

Port Alberni

- Holy Family/Notre Dame

Tofino

- St. Francis of Assisi

Ucluelet

- Holy Family

Alert Bay

- Our Lady of Assumption

Port Hardy

- St. Bonaventure

Port McNeill

- St. Mary's

Port Alice

- St. Theresa's

Sayward

- St Bernadette's

Tahsis

- St. Joseph's

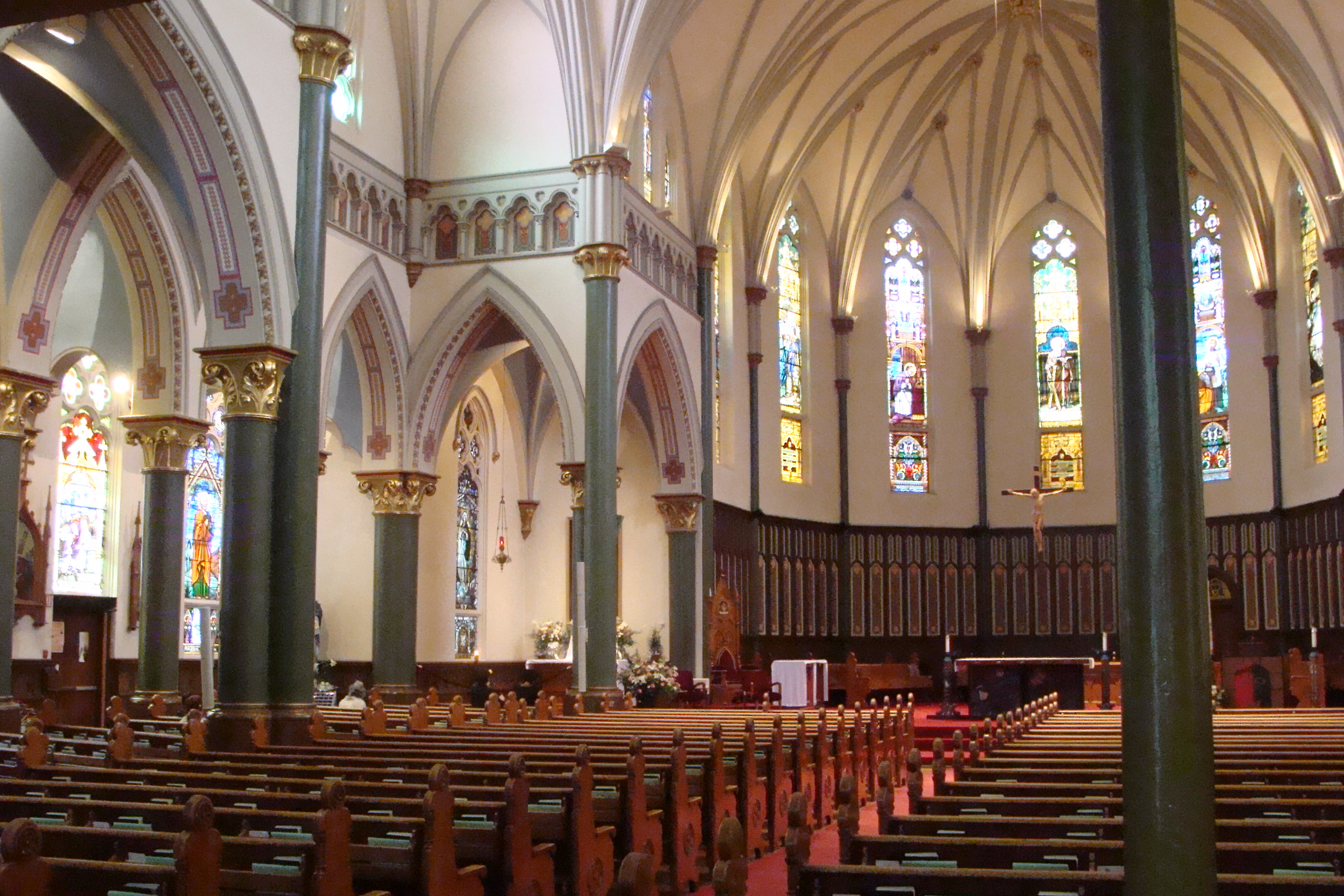
Inside St. Andrew's Cathedral

=== Monasteries ===
- House of Bread Monastery, a Benedictine monastery in Nanaimo

== Education ==
=== Catholic high schools ===
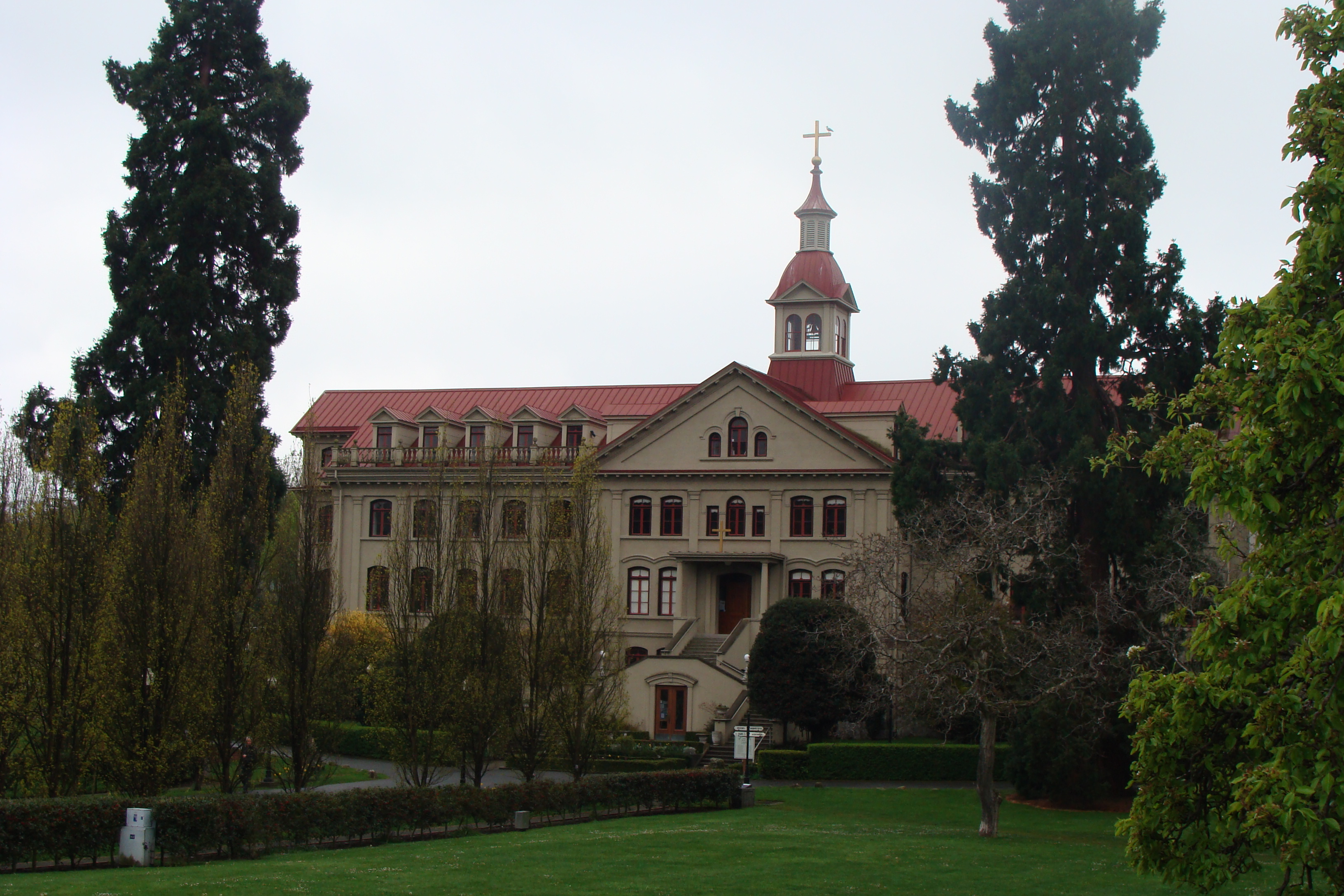
St. Ann's Academy, is now a heritage site

School	City	Est.	Website	Enrolment
St. Andrew's Regional High School	Victoria		http://www.standrewshigh.ca/	~475 (co-ed)

- St. Ann's Academy (Victoria, British Columbia), was open 1858 and closed in 1974.
- Smith Memorial High School, of Port Alberni, was opened 1951 and closed in 1976.

=== Catholic elementary schools ===
School	City	Est.	Website
St. Joseph’s	Victoria		http://www.stjosephschool.ca/
St. Patrick's	Victoria		http://www.stpatrickselem.ca/
Queen of Angels	Duncan		http://www.queenofangels.ca/
St. John Paul II	Port Alberni	1951	http://www.jp2nd.ca/

- St. Ann's Academy for Boys, of Duncan, was erected in 1864 and closed in 1969.
- St. Mary's School, of Ladysmith, was established 1909 and closed in 1913.

=== Catholic universities, colleges, and seminaries ===
- St. Joseph's School for Nursing, of Victoria, was erected in 1900 and closed in 1981.
- St. John Fisher / Thomas More College 1953 and closed in 1993.

== Religious institutes ==
Religious institutes of women

- Benedictine Sisters
- Franciscan Poor Clares
- Missionary Oblates of Mary Immaculate
- Sisters of St. Ann

== Residential schools ==
The Diocese managed two residential schools in British Columbia. Upon the discovery of the remains of 215 children at Kamloops Indian Residential School, the diocese released a statement of apology and commitment.

- Kuper Island Indian Residential School
- The Christie Roman Catholic school

== Charities ==
Health Care

- Lourdes Hospital, of Campbell River, was erected in 1926 and closed in 1957.
- St. Joseph's Hospital, of Victoria, was erected in 1876 and closed in 1972.

== Notes ==
- The diocese produces the Diocesan Messenger which is a Catholic newspaper for its community.

== Bibliography ==
- Sisters of St. Ann's scrapbook
- St. Ann's establishments
- "Diocese of Victoria". Catholic-Hierarchy.
