= Jean-Nicolas Lemmens =

Dutch Catholic priest and Bishop of Victoria, Vancouver Island, Canada

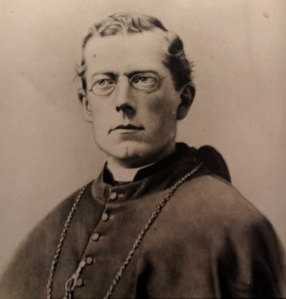

Jean-Nicolas Lemmens (also Joannes Nicolaas Lemmens or Joannes Nicolaus Lemmens) (3 June 1850, in Schimmert – 10 August 1897, in Cobán (Guatemala)) was a Dutch Catholic priest and Bishop of Victoria, Vancouver Island, Canada. He was a strong supporter of the British Columbian organised labour movement.

== Family ==
Jean-Nicolas Lemmens was born the son of (alderman) Godfried Lemmens and Gertrude Bemelmans, within a large Dutch Roman Catholic, family originating from the Beek-Schimmert area in the southern Netherlands.

This regent family produced a number of Catholic priests, including his nephews, William and Hendrik Lemmens, also priests in Victoria, Canada, and Guillaume Lemmens (1884-1960), Bishop of Roermond in the Netherlands. Next, numerous mayors and aldermen have belonged to this family.

== Career ==
Lemmens studied at the American College in Leuven, Belgium, which was founded in 1857. He then moved, with his nephew Hendrik, to Vancouver Island, Canada.

After the murder of Monseigneur Seghers in 1888 he was appointed Bishop of Victoria. He laid the foundation stone of St. Andrew's Cathedral in 1890, which can still be seen near the side entrance. On 30 October 1892 he consecrated the Cathedral.

During the early 1890s, Lemmens actively encouraged local Catholics to join labour organisations (including the forerunner to the British Columbia Federation of Labour which had been established in 1890) and to unite with other citizens to press, "for better working conditions". He is considered as one of the earliest supporters of organised labour in British Columbia.

Lemmens travelled to Guatemala in June, July and August 1897 owing to the "prolonged exile" of local Archbishop Casanova. During his travels he often wrote detailed letters to his parents in the Netherlands. While there he confirmed 15,000 local Catholics. However, he contracted dysentery and died on 10 August.

== Legacy ==
Next to his foundational support of the British Columbia Federation of Labour, Lemmens studied the languages of the Indigenous peoples of Vancouver Island and the surrounding region extensively. He compiled a dictionary of these languages, using Webster's Dictionary as a source of inspiration.

After his death, a committee was formed to collect donations for the construction of a memorial monument in honor of Lemmens in the church of his birthplace, Schimmert. The unveiling of the monument was reported in the Dutch Newspaper De Tijd on October 10, 1901. Since then, Saint Andrew's Cathedral and Saint Remigius Church in Schimmert have each housed an identical crucifix in memory of bishop Lemmens of Vancouver Island.

On Vancouver Island, a bay has been named after him: the Lemmens Inlet, near Tofino in the Clayoquot region, where he served at the mission stations of Ahousaht and Opitsaht

Preceded by Charles John Seghers	Bishop of Victoria; 1888–1897	Succeeded by Alexander Christie
