= House of Bread Monastery =

Benedictine monastery in Nanaimo, Canada

Coordinates: 49.1646°N 124.0047°W

House of Bread Monastery is a Benedictine monastery in Nanaimo, British Columbia, Canada.

== History ==
In 1972 Bishop Remi J. De Roo of the Diocese of Victoria, British Columbia met with the General Chapter of the Federation of St. Gertrude and requested, "that the Benedictines return to Vancouver Island, BC so that their spirituality might be shared with the people in the area." In response the House of Bread Monastery was established as a Dependent Priory of the Queen of Angels Monastery, Mt. Angel, Oregon.

In 1993 House of Bread Monastery was incorporated into the Federation of St. Gertrude and Sister Jean Ann Berning, O.S.B. was elected first Prioress.

== Overview ==
They believe the orientation of the Rule of St. Benedict and their Swiss Benedictine heritage to be basically Eucharistic. Their community emphasizes this orientation by the choice of the name "House of Bread" to signify that they desire to be sacrament persons sharing the "bread" of Scripture and Eucharistic presence with others. Personal prayer and spiritual reading (Lectio) are values to be supported by the presence of an oratory, a library, and agreement concerning times and areas of quiet. Daily liturgically oriented corporate prayer is essential, as is shared responsibility for its preparation

The community is mindful of their natural environment, and the need to call themselves to good stewardship of the natural gifts of God in their Island setting.
