= Archdiocese of Vancouver =

Catholic ecclesiastical territory

Coordinates: 49.2500°N 123.1000°W

Archdiocese of Vancouver Archidioecesis Vancouveriensis
- The Coat of Arms of the Archdiocese of Vancouver

Location
- Country: Canada
- Territory: South West British Columbia
- Ecclesiastical province: Vancouver

Statistics
- Area: 119,439 km^{2} (46,116 sq mi)
- Population: 405,761 (12.4%)

Information
- Denomination: Catholic
- Sui iuris church: Latin Church
- Rite: Roman Rite
- Established: 14 December 1863; 162 years ago
- Cathedral: Holy Rosary Cathedral (Vancouver)

Current leadership
- Pope: Leo XIV
- Metropolitan Archbishop: Richard W. Smith
- Suffragans: Joseph Phuong Nguyen; Bishop of Kamloops; Gregory Bittman; Bishop of Nelson; Stephen Jensen; Bishop of Prince George; Gary Gordon; Bishop of Victoria
- Bishops emeritus: J. Michael Miller, CSB

Website
- rcav.org

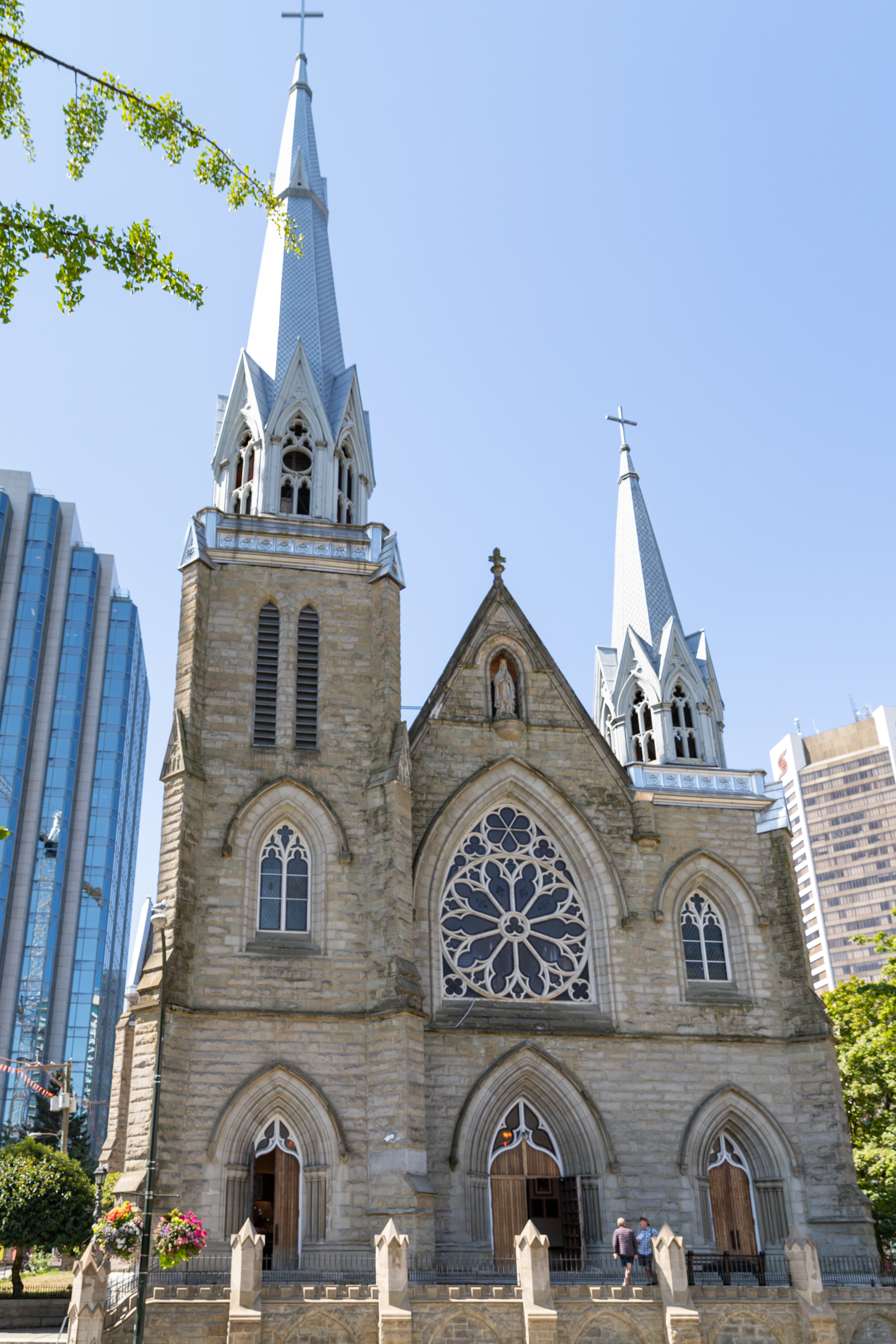
Holy Rosary Cathedral in Vancouver, British Columbia

The Archdiocese of Vancouver (Latin: Archidioecesis Vancouveriensis) is a Latin Church archdiocese of the Catholic Church that includes part of the Canadian province of British Columbia.

Its cathedral archiepiscopal see is the Holy Rosary Cathedral, dedicated to the diocesan patron saint Our Lady of the Rosary, in Vancouver, B.C.

The incumbent ordinary of the archdiocese is Richard W. Smith.

== Ecclesiastical province ==
The Archbishop of Vancouver is the metropolitan see of the ecclesiastical province of Vancouver, which also includes as suffragan dioceses :

- Kamloops (daughter created in 1945)
- Nelson (daughter created in 1936)
- Prince George (elevated to diocese 1967)
- Victoria (former archdiocese, demoted to diocese in 1908).

== Archdiocesan statistics ==
As per 2022 archdiocesan annual report, it pastorally serves 446,670 Catholics on approximately 120,000 km^{2}. The archdiocese contains 77 parishes, 204 priests, 91 religious sisters, 34 permanent deacons and 446,670 baptized Catholics. There are 52 Catholic schools and 4 higher education institutions.

== Anniversaries of significance to the archdiocese ==
- October 3 – Anniversary of the Dedication of Holy Rosary Cathedral (1953)
- October 7 – Solemnity of the Holy Rosary, patronal feast of both the archdiocese and the cathedral
- December 14 – Anniversary of the establishment of the Vicariate Apostolic of British Columbia (1863)

== History ==
=== Precursor ===
On 24 July 1846, the Diocese of Vancouver Island was erected on territory split off from the Apostolic Vicariate of Oregon (based in the US Oregon Territory; now Diocese of Victoria).

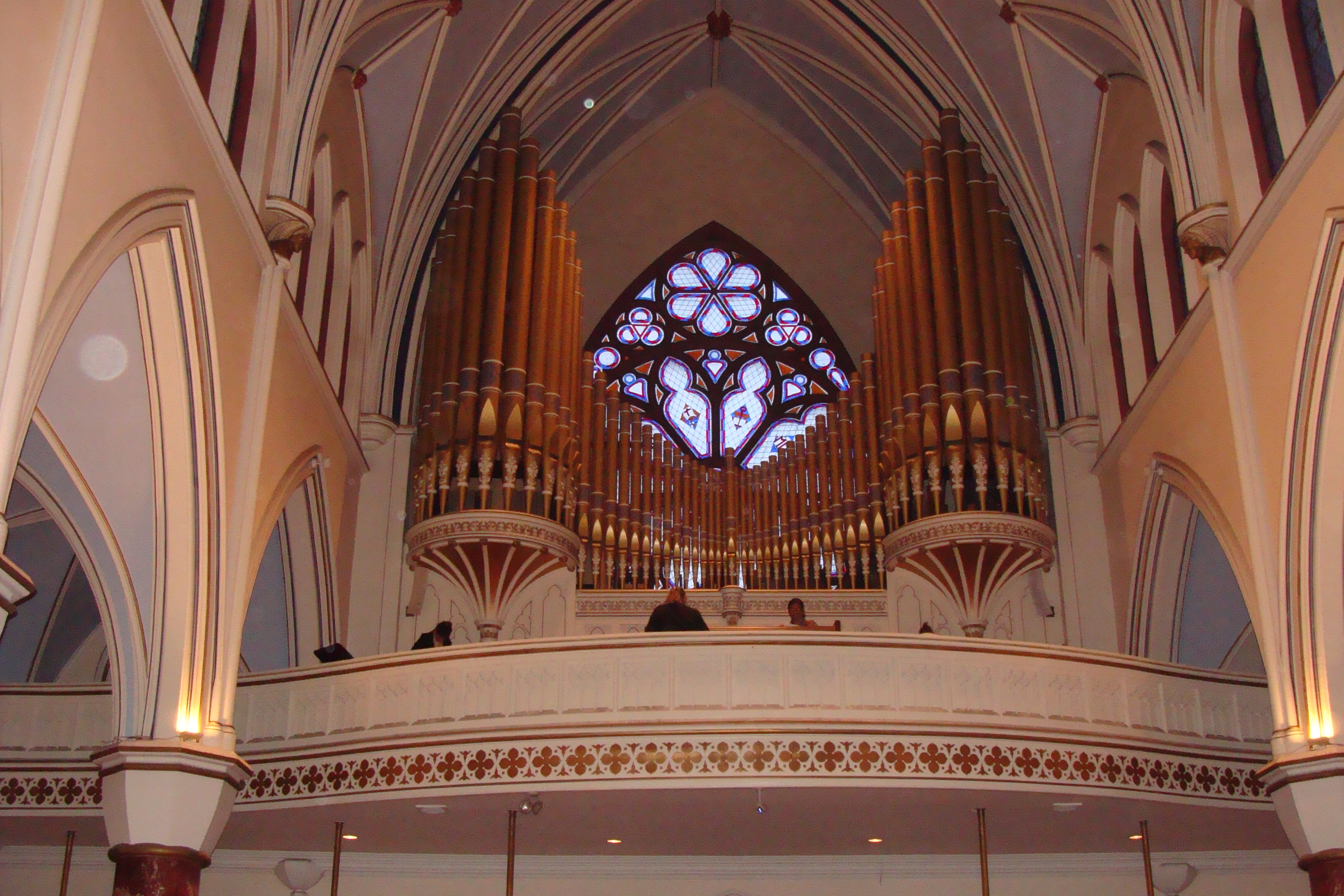
Holy Rosary Cathedral pipe organ

=== Oblates of Mary Immaculate years ===
On 14 December 1863, the Apostolic Vicariate of British Columbia was erected on territory split off from the Diocese of Vancouver Island. A French priest, Louis-Joseph D'Herbomez, from the Oblates of Mary Immaculate, became the first vicar apostolic of the newly formed territory. He was soon ordained Titular Bishop of Miletopolis in 1864 and served the Catholic community until his death in 1890.

On 2 September 1890, the pre-diocesan Apostolic Vicariate of British Columbia becomes the Diocese of New Westminster. Another Oblate of Mary Immaculate French bishop, Pierre-Paul Durieu, took over the responsibilities and served the community until his death in 1899. On July 27, 1894, during his tenure, the US Territory of Alaska was lost in the creation of the Apostolic Prefecture of Alaska.

Another French bishop, Augustin Dontenwill, took governance of the Diocese of New Westminster in 1899 and served the community until he resigned, to become the superior general of the Oblates of Mary Immaculate, in 1908. Under his tenure the Holy Rosary Church was commissioned.

=== Under the Archdiocese of Victoria ===
In 1903, the Diocese of Vancouver Island was elevated to Archdiocese of Vancouver Island and in 1904, it was renamed as the Archdiocese of Victoria. A German-born bishop, Bertram Orth, was appointed archbishop in 1903 and led the Archdiocese of Victoria and its suffrages until he resigned in 1908.

On 19 September 1908, the Diocese of New Westminster was elevated to the Metropolitan Archdiocese of Vancouver and in October, 1908, the Archdiocese of Victoria was lowered to the Diocese of Victoria. Father Alexander MacDonald, of Nova Scotia, was quickly appointed and ordained Bishop of Victoria.

=== First Canadian bishops ===
For just over one year the Archdiocese of Vancouver had no bishop until Neil McNeil, Bishop of St. George's, Newfoundland, became the first Canadian appointed Archbishop of Vancouver on 19 January 1910. His tenure was short, as he then went on to become the Archbishop of Toronto on 10 April 1912.

In August 1912, Timothy Casey, Bishop of Saint John in America, New Brunswick, becomes the 5th archbishop of Vancouver. In 1914, what is now called World War I broke out, and Archbishop Casey had to battle hard financial times for the archdiocese. Under his governance, Holy Rosary Church became a cathedral. He served his community until his death in October 1931.

=== "Iron Duke" years ===
In August 1928, a priest from Saint John, New Brunswick, became coadjutor Archbishop of Vancouver, and on 5 October 1931, Bishop William Mark Duke became the archbishop. In his 32 years of service to his community, Archbishop Duke had to deal with the Great Depression of the Dirty Thirties and later World War II. His strict disciplinarian beliefs and financial management of the archdiocese earned him the title “Iron Duke”. The legacy that was left behind when Duke retired in March 1964 is notable. He helped establish St. Mark's College at the University of British Columbia, 2 Catholic high schools, 1 non-diocese Catholic high school, 22 Catholic elementary schools and 3 Catholic hospitals including many new parishes in the diocese alone.

During his tenure the archbishopric lost territory twice, to establish suffragan sees. On February 22, 1936, the Diocese of Nelson was erected and on December 22, 1945, the Diocese of Kamloops. These new dioceses helped erect a new high school, new elementary schools and parishes.

The bishop of Nelson, Martin Michael Johnston, became Coadjutor Archbishop of Vancouver in 1954 to assist Archbishop Duke during Duke's last 10 years of governance. Bishop Johnston became Archbishop of Vancouver on 1964 and retired in 1969. During Archbishop Johnston's tenure, the Vicariate of Prince Rupert was elevated to the Diocese of Prince George in 1967.

=== Project Advance years ===
Auxiliary Bishop James Carney became Archbishop of Vancouver in 1969. Carney became the first Vancouver-born bishop to be appointed to the archdiocese. During his tenure Carney saw the need to rebuild many of the parishes, schools and hospitals that were showing their age. Project Advance was introduced into the community that required the parishes to raise funds. These funds went back into the community to help rebuild their parishes & schools and also to build new facilities, like Archbishop Carney Regional Secondary School, which was built in the archbishop's honour after he died in 1990.

It enjoyed a Papal visit from Pope John Paul II in August 1984.

=== Archdiocesan synod ===
The archdiocese concluded a nine-year synod in December 2006. Lay and religious representatives from every parish, Catholic school, religious community, the local seminary, and Catholic organizations took part, as well as non-Catholic observers who were invited to the process.

Although it formally ran from October 2002 to October 2003, extensive preparation went into the synod as far back as 1998 during the period leading up to the Great Jubilee of the Year 2000. The synod's aim was to bring the Church of Vancouver into the 21st century, from the “maintenance” mode it was in to more of a mission-driven model, as former archbishop emeritus Adam Exner, OMI, put it.

On December 3, 2006, at Holy Rosary Cathedral, Archbishop Raymond Roussin officially declared the synod closed, officially setting in motion the initiatives proposed.

According to the archdiocesan newspaper The B.C. Catholic, the first 20 declarations from the synod were to come into effect almost immediately. "Among the highlights are initiatives to encourage pastors to delegate more duties to the laity, to promote the faith formation of teachers, to initiate an adult faith formation strategy, to establish an office and vicar for evangelization, and to initiate a support group for priests."

=== Current situation ===
The archdiocese is working on a significant infrastructure upgrade. This includes upgrades to multiple churches and schools. The vision is focused on helping people experience God's merciful love through four key ways: Making Every Sunday Matter, Getting Closer to Jesus, Strengthening Marriages and Families, and Developing Parish Leadership and Support. The Archdiocese of Vancouver is considered to be among the most conservative of Canada.

==== Indigenous relations ====
In 2013, the Archdiocese of Vancouver issued an Expression of Apology and Hope to the Truth and Reconciliation Commission of Canada over its role in implementing the Canadian government's residential schools system. All records held by the Archdiocese of Vancouver regarding residential schools were submitted to the TRC, and they remain available for review. The TRC approved of the submission made by the Archdiocese, and Archbishop Michael Miller addressed the Commission in September 2013 at the Pacific Coliseum.

In June 2015, the archdiocese repeated its "sincere and heartfert apology for the role that the Church played in the federal government's policy which involved forcibly separating children from their families and placing them in residential schools". In June 2021, the Archdiocese issued a formal apology to First Nations over its role in the genocidal residential schools system, with Archbishop J. Michael Miller stating that "the Church was unquestionably wrong in implementing a government colonialist policy which resulted in devastation for children, families and communities."

Catholic Schools in the Archdiocese of Vancouver have worked with local Indigenous leaders to build bridges to a deeper understanding of history and a clearer path towards reconciliation. Following the TRC Calls to Action, Points 61.1 to 61.5, the Archdiocese of Vancouver is involved in projects honouring Indigenous art, music, and language preservation and revitalization, and looks forward to more opportunities to create understanding, empathy, and respect.

In February 2022, the Archdiocese of Vancouver pledged $2.5 million over five years to the Indigenous Reconciliation Fund, which seeks to support projects that are determined locally, in collaboration with First Nations, Métis and Inuit partners. Funds will be focused on projects and programs that respond to the Truth and Reconciliation Commission Calls to Action #60, 61, and 73–76, which called for healing and reconciliation for communities and families, survivor-directed work related to cemetery sites of former residential schools, and language, culture, education, and community support.

==== Sex abuse ====
In the fall of 2018 following the disclosure of global sexual abuse by clergy and on the advice and prompting of some victim-survivors as well as many others searching for justice, Archbishop J. Michael Miller, CSB, appointed a Committee to conduct a file review of historical cases of sexual abuse by clergy who served or resided in the Archdiocese of Vancouver.

In 2019, the Archdiocese of Vancouver released a Report on Clergy Sexual Abuse, with 31 recommendations and responses. The report publicly named nine clergymen who were criminally convicted of sexual abuse or who had civil lawsuits related to abuse settled against them. It was also acknowledged that the archdiocese was aware of 36 sex abuse cases since the 1950s, which involved 26 children. The Archdiocese of Vancouver was the first among Canada's 60 Catholic dioceses to make this information public.

In August 2020, a new sex abuse lawsuit was filed against the Archdiocese of Vancouver. The lead plaintiff, identified only by the initials K.S. in the court documents, said the priest in charge of St. Francis of Assisi School, Father Michael Conaghan, sexually assaulted her while she was a student at the school in the '80s. She was around 11 years old at the time of the alleged abuse. Conaghan, who died four days after the lawsuit was filed, was not among the nine clergy listed by the archiocese in 2019.

In December 2020, the Archdiocese of Vancouver settled more sex abuse cases involved three additional priests who sexually abuse 13 previously undisclosed victims. The three priests named were also not previously listed on the Archdiocese of Vancouver's credibly accused list.

== Coat of arms ==

The precious mitre (headgear), featured at the top, is a standard for diocesan armorial bearings.

Charges on the Escutcheon

Escutcheon meaning the shield featured in heraldry.

Heraldic Rose

The heraldic rose on the top left symbolizes Holy Rosary Cathedral’s dedication to Our Lady of the Holy Rosary.

Pacific Dogwood

The Pacific dogwood (Cornus nuttallii) on the top right is the floral symbol of the province British Columbia.

Chi-Rho

Chi-Rho ⳩ is the Greek monogram for Christ. Formed by superimposing the first two letters of the Greek word ΧΡΙΣΤΟΣ meaning Christ.

Three Chevrons

The three chevrons represent the North Shore Mountains that overlook Vancouver. The mountains depicted are intended to represent the Hollyburn, Grouse and Seymour mountaintops.

The Barque of St. Peter

The Barque of St. Peter, the ship, symbolises the church. On the escutcheon it is depicted as casting a net into the ocean referencing Matthew 4:18-19:

"As he walked by the Sea of Galilee, he saw two brothers, Simon who is called Peter and Andrew his brother, casting a net into the sea; for they were fishermen. And he said to them, “Follow me, and I will make you fishers of men.”" (RSV)

== Leadership ==
=== Ordinaries ===
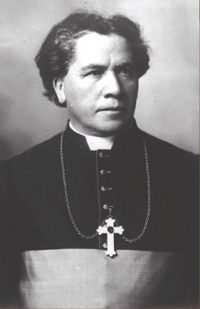
Augustin Dontenwill, the last Bishop of New Westminster and first Archbishop of Vancouver

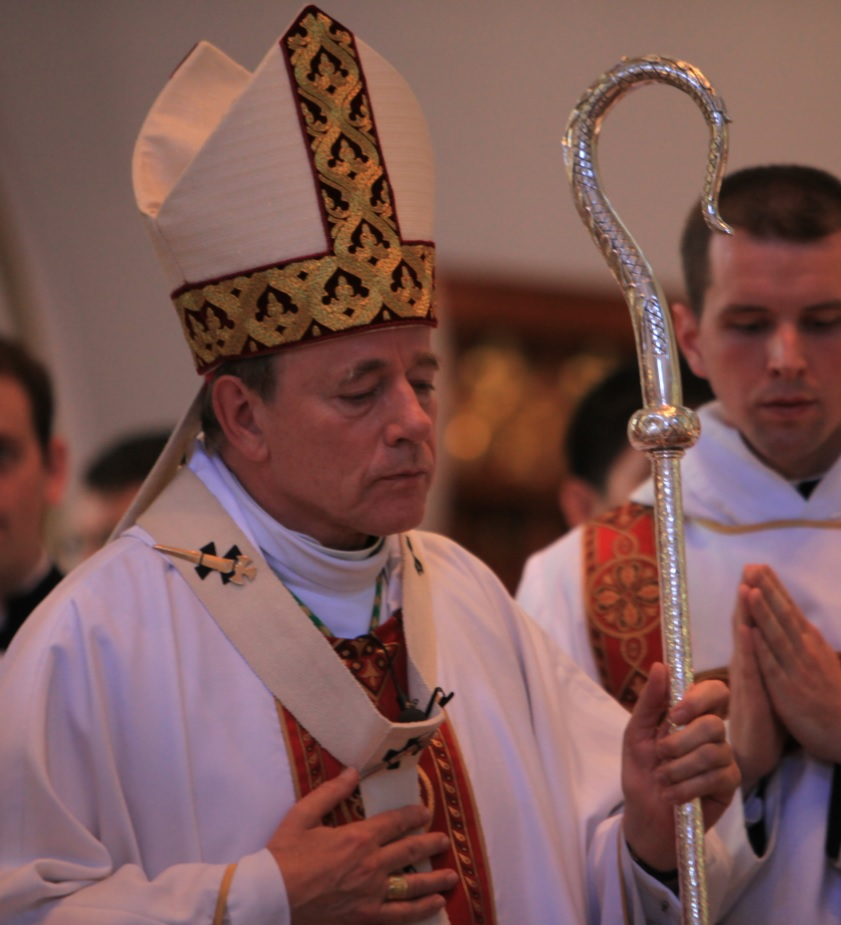
J. Michael Miller was the Archbishop of Vancouver from 2009 until his retirement in 2025.

Below is a list of individuals who have led the Archdiocese of Vancouver and its antecedent jurisdictions since its founding.

==== Apostolic Vicars of British Columbia ====
- Louis-Joseph d'Herbomez (1863–1890)
- Pierre-Paul Durieu (1890)

==== Bishops of New Westminster ====
- Pierre-Paul Durieu (1890–1899)
- Augustin Dontenwill (1899–1908)

==== Metropolitan Archbishops of Vancouver ====
- Augustin Dontenwill (1908–1910)
- Neil McNeil (1910–1912)
- Timothy Casey (1912–1931)
- William Mark Duke (1931–1964)
- Martin Michael Johnson (1964–1969)
- James Carney (1969–1990)
- Adam Exner (1991–2004)
- Raymond Roussin (2004–2009)
- J. Michael Miller (2009–2025)
- Richard W. Smith (2025–present)

=== Coadjutor archbishops ===
Under the Code of Canon Law, the coadjutor bishop has the right of succession (cum jure successionis) upon the death, retirement or resignation of the diocesan bishop he is assisting. All coadjutor ordinaries eventually succeeded to become head of the Archdiocese of Vancouver or its antecedent jurisdictions.

- Pierre-Paul Durieu (1875–1890), as coadjutor apostolic vicar
- Augustin Dontenwill (1897–1899), as coadjutor bishop
- William Mark Duke (1928–1931)
- Martin Michael Johnson (1954–1964)
- J. Michael Miller (2007–2009)

=== Auxiliary bishops ===
Unlike coadjutors, auxiliary bishops do not have the right of succession, per canon 975, §1 of the 1983 Code of Canon Law. Only Carney went on to become Archbishop of Vancouver.

- Edward Quentin Jennings (1941–1946), appointed Bishop of Kamloops
- James Carney (1966–1969), appointed Archbishop of Vancouver
- Lawrence Sabatini (1978–1982), appointed Bishop of Kamloops

=== Other priests of this archdiocese who became bishops ===
Seven priests from the archdiocese subsequently became bishops of other dioceses outside of Vancouver. The first year listed in brackets indicates the year they were ordained as a priest for the archdiocese. This list omits Carney; though he was a priest for the archdiocese from 1942 until 1966, he subsequently became auxiliary bishop of the same archdiocese in 1966, and Archbishop of Vancouver in 1969.

- Peter Mallon (1956–1990), appointed Bishop of Nelson in 1990
- David Monroe (1967–2002), appointed Bishop of Kamloops in 2002. Returned to the archdiocese after his retirement in 2016.
- Richard Gagnon (1983–2004), appointed Bishop of Victoria, British Columbia in 2004. Returned to the archdiocese after his retirement in 2025.
- Gary Gordon (1982–2006), appointed Bishop of Whitehorse in 2006
- Stephen Jensen (1980–2013), appointed Bishop of Prince George in 2013
- Mark Hagemoen (1990–2013), appointed Bishop of Mackenzie–Fort Smith in 2013
- Joseph Phuong Nguyen (1992–2016), appointed Bishop of Kamloops in 2016
- Gary Franken (1989–2022), appointed Bishop of Saint Paul, Alberta in 2022

== Churches ==
The churches offer masses in the following languages: Arabic, Chinese (Cantonese), Chinese (Mandarin), Croatian, English, French, German, Hungarian, Indonesian, Italian, Korean, Laotian, Traditional Latin, Polish, Portuguese, Slovak, Spanish, Tagalog and Vietnamese.

Vancouver

- Holy Rosary Cathedral Archived 2016-09-23 at the Wayback Machine
- Blessed Sacrament (French)
- Corpus Christi
- Guardian Angels
- Holy Family
- Holy Name of Jesus
- Immaculate Conception
- Immaculate Heart of Mary (Croatian)
- Our Lady of Fatima (Portuguese)
- Our Lady of Hungary (Hungarian)
- Our Lady of Perpetual Help
- Our Lady of Sorrows
- Sacred Heart
- Saint Andrew's
- Saint Anthony of Padua
- Saint Augustine's
- Saint Casimir's (Polish)
- Saint Francis of Assisi
- Saint Francis Xavier (Chinese)
- Saint John the Apostle (Cantonese)
- Saint Joseph's (Vietnamese)
- Saint Jude's
- Saint Mark
- Saint Mary's
- Saint Patrick's
- Saint Paul's
- Saints Peter and Paul

Burnaby

- Holy Cross
- Lady of Mercy
- Saint Francis de Sales
- Saint George's Melkite-Greek Catholic Mission
- Saint Helen's
- Saint Michael's
- Saint Theresa's

Coquitlam

- All Saints
- Our Lady of Fatima
- Our Lady of Lourdes
- Saint Clare of Assisi

New Westminster

- Holy Spirit
- Saint Peter's
- Saints Cyril and Methodius (Slovak)

North Vancouver

- Holy Trinity
- Saint Edmund's
- Saint Paul's
- Saint Pius X
- Saint Stephen's

Richmond

- Church of Canadian Martyrs (Chinese)
- Saint Joseph the Worker
- Saint Monica's
- Saint Paul's

Surrey

- Holy Cross
- Good Shepherd
- Star of the Sea
- Our Lady of Good Counsel
- Precious Blood
- Saint Andrew Kim (Korean)
- Saint Bernadette
- Saint Matthew's

Abbotsford

- Saint Ann's
- Saint James

Agassiz

- Saint Anthony of Padua

Aldergrove

- Saints Joachim & Ann

Bowen Island

- Saint Gerard's Mission

Chilliwack

- Saint Mary's

Delta

- Immaculate Conception
- Sacred Heart

Gibsons

- Saint Mary's

Hope

- Our Lady of Good Hope

Langley

- Saint Joseph's
- Saint Nicholas

Maple Ridge

- Saint Luke's
- Saint Patrick's

Mission

- Saint Joseph's
- Seminary of Christ the King/Westminster Abbey

Port Coquitlam

- Our Lady of the Assumption

Port Moody

- Saint Joseph's

Powell River

- Church of the Assumption

Sechelt

- Holy Family
- Our Lady of Lourdes (Sechelt Nation)

Squamish

- Saint Joseph's

West Vancouver

- Christ the Redeemer
- Saint Anthony's

== Education ==
=== Catholic high schools ===
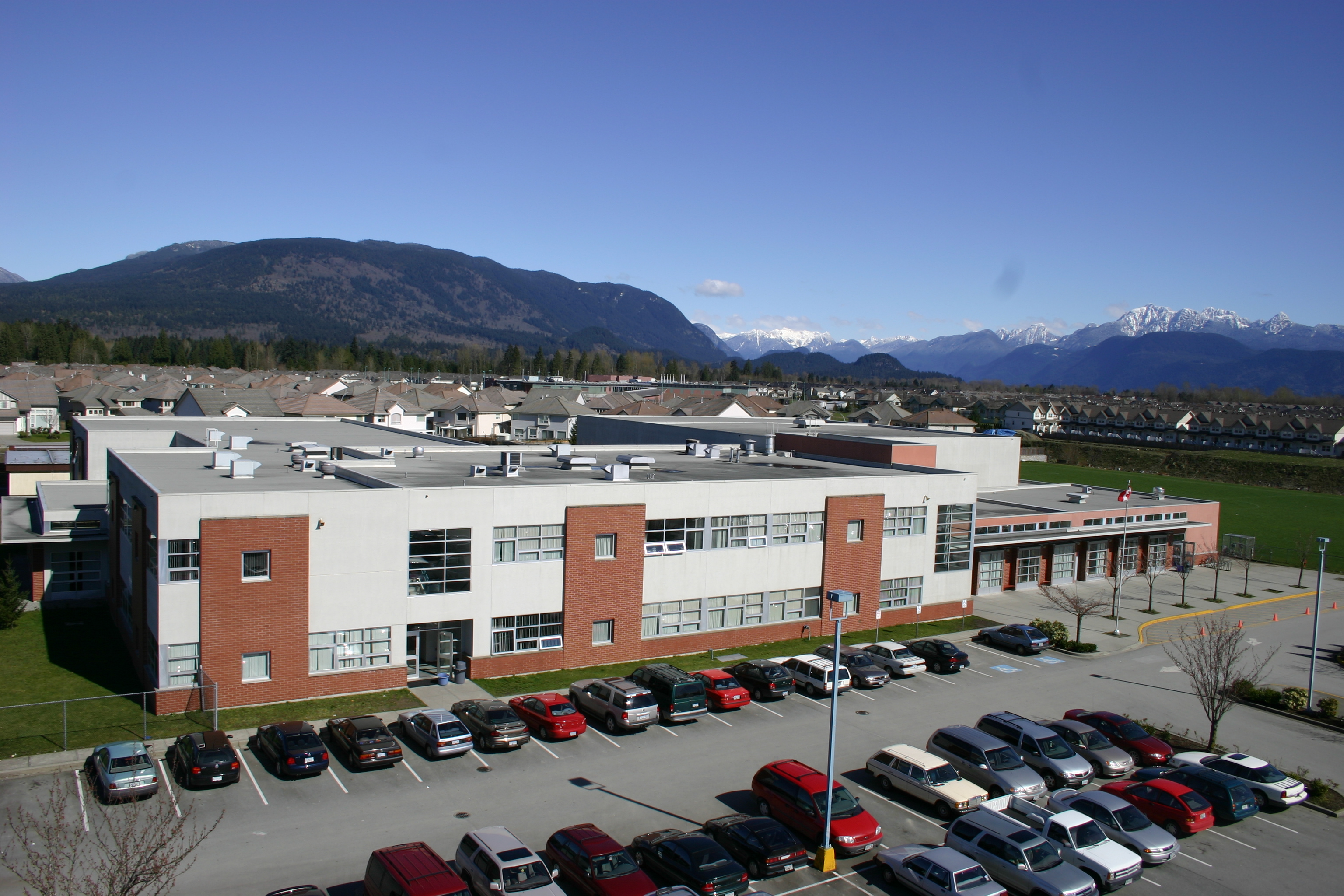
Aerial View of the Archdiocese's new Archbishop Carney Secondary School in the early 1990s

School	City	Est.	Website	Enrollment
Holy Cross Regional High School	Surrey	1982	http://www.holycross.bc.ca/	~780 (co-ed)
St. Thomas Aquinas Regional Secondary School	North Vancouver	1953	http://www.aquinas.org/	~600 (co-ed)
Archbishop Carney Regional Secondary School	Port Coquitlam	1994	http://www.acrss.org/	~750 (co-ed)
St. Patrick's Regional Secondary	Vancouver	1928	http://www.stpats.bc.ca/	~500 (co-ed)
St. Thomas More Collegiate (non-diocese)	Burnaby	1960	http://www.stmc.bc.ca/	~660 (co-ed)
St. John Brebeuf Regional Secondary	Abbotsford	1992	http://www.stjohnbrebeuf.ca/	~335 (co-ed)
St. John Paul II Academy	White Rock	2017	https://www.sjp2academy.com/	~N/A
Notre Dame Regional Secondary School	Vancouver	1953	http://www.ndrs.org/	~600 (co-ed)
Traditional Learning Academy	Coquitlam	1991	http://traditionallearning.com/	
Vancouver College (non-diocese)	Vancouver	1922	http://www.vc.bc.ca/	~600 (boys)
Little Flower Academy (non-diocese)	Vancouver	1927	http://www.lfabc.org/	~470 (girls)

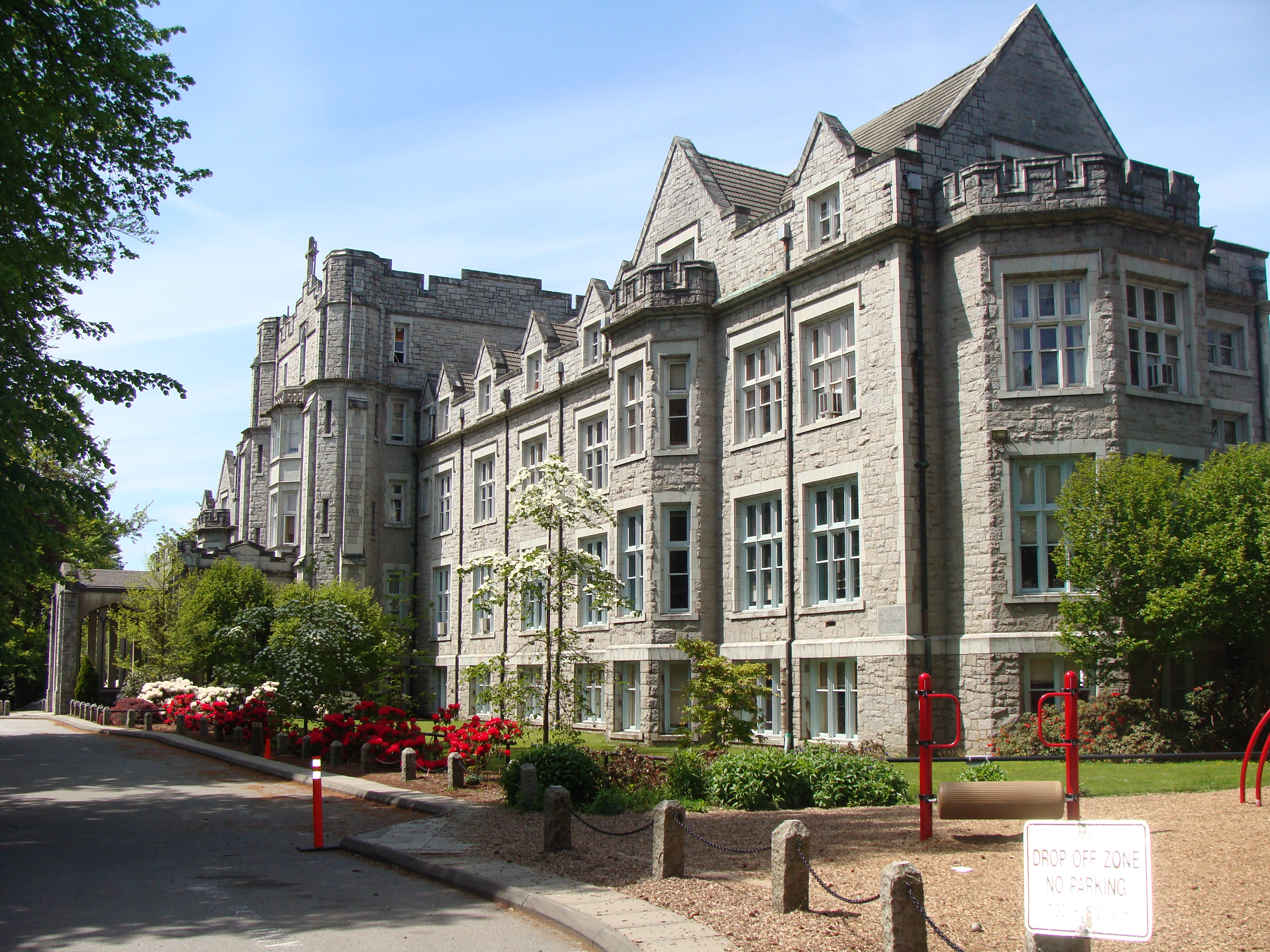
Convent of the Sacred Heart high school closed 1979. Now it is St. George's Junior School

- The Seminary of Christ the King, Mission, BC, is 1 of 2 Canadian high school seminaries. The other is located in Cornwall, Ontario.
- The Convent of Sacred Heart High School was an all-girls school, in Vancouver, opened in 1911. The school was closed down in 1979 and sold to become St. George's School (Vancouver) junior school.
- Marian High School was an all girls school run by the Sisters of Charity of St. Louis. It was located in Burnaby BC, adjacent to St. Michael's Parish. It opened in 1965 and was closed by the archdiocese in 1988.

=== Catholic elementary schools ===
School	City	Est.	Website
Assumption School	Powell River	1961	http://www.assumpschool.com/
Blessed Sacrament	Vancouver	1954	http://www.ess.vancouver.bc.ca/
Cloverdale Catholic	Surrey	1954	http://ccsunited.ca/
Corpus Christi	Vancouver	1957	http://www.corpuschristi-school.ca
Holy Cross	Burnaby	1959	http://www.holycrosselementary.ca/
Holy Trinity	North Vancouver	1955	http://www.holytschool.org/
Immaculate Conception	Delta	1959	http://www.icdelta.com/
Immaculate Conception	Vancouver	1926	http://www.icschoolvancouver.com/
Our Lady of Fatima	Coquitlam	1947	http://www.fatimaschool.ca/
Our Lady of Good Counsel	Surrey	1957	http://www.ourladyofgoodcounselschool.ca/
Our Lady of Mercy	Burnaby	1959	http://www.ourladyofmercy.ca/
Our Lady of Perpetual Help	Vancouver	1927	http://www.olphbc.ca/
Our Lady of Sorrows	Vancouver	1926	http://www.ourladyofsorrows.ca/
Our Lady of the Assumption	Port Coquitlam	1982	http://www.assumptionschool.com/
Queen of All Saints	Coquitlam	1996	http://www.queenofallsaintsschool.ca/
Sacred Heart	Delta	1944	http://www.shsdelta.org/
St. Andrew's	Vancouver	1937	http://www.standrewschool.ca/
St. Anthony of Padua	Vancouver	1997	http://www.stanthonyofpaduaschool.ca/
St. Anthony's	West Vancouver	1958	http://www.saswv.ca/
St. Augustine's	Vancouver	1921	http://www.staugschool.ca/
St. Bernadette's	Surrey	1986	http://www.stbernadetteparish.ca/
St. Catherine's	Langley	1986	http://www.stcatherines.ca/
St. Edmund's	North Vancouver	1911	http://www.stedmunds.ca/
St. Francis de Sales	Burnaby	1954	http://www.stfrancisdesalesschool.ca/
St. Francis of Assisi	Vancouver	1946	http://sfaschool.ca
St. Francis Xavier	Vancouver	1940	http://www.sfxschool.ca/
St. Helen's	Burnaby	1923	http://www.sthelensschool.ca/
St. James	Abbotsford	1985	http://www.stjameselementary.ca/
St. Joseph's	Vancouver	1922	http://www.stjoesschool-vancouver.org/
St. Joseph the Worker	Richmond	1988	http://stjo.richmond.bc.ca/
St. Jude's	Vancouver	1955	http://www.stjudevancouver.com/
St. Mary's	Chilliwack	1948	http://www.saintmarysschool.ca/
St. Mary's	Vancouver	1931	http://www.stmary.bc.ca/
St. Matthew's	Surrey	2012	http://www.stmatthewselementary.ca/
St. Michael's	Burnaby	1957	http://www.stmichaelschool.ca/
St. Patrick's	Maple Ridge	1955	http://www.stpatsschool.org
St. Patrick's	Vancouver	1922	http://stpatselementary.net/
St. Paul's	Richmond	1960	http://www.stpaulschool.ca/
St. Pius X	North Vancouver	1996	http://www.saintpius.ca/
Star of the Sea	White Rock	1981	http://www.starofthesea.bc.ca/school/
Vancouver College	Vancouver	1922	http://www.vc.bc.ca/

- St. Ann's Academy, of Vancouver (located by Holy Rosary Cathedral), was open 1888 & closed 1946.
- St. Ann's Academy, of New Westminster, was open 1865 & closed 1968.
- St. Peter's School, of New Westminster, was open 1945 & closed in 1968.
- Holy Ghost School, of Lulu Island, was opened 1947 & closed in 1955.
- In 1982, Little Flower Academy closed its elementary section of the school.

=== Catholic universities, colleges, and seminaries ===
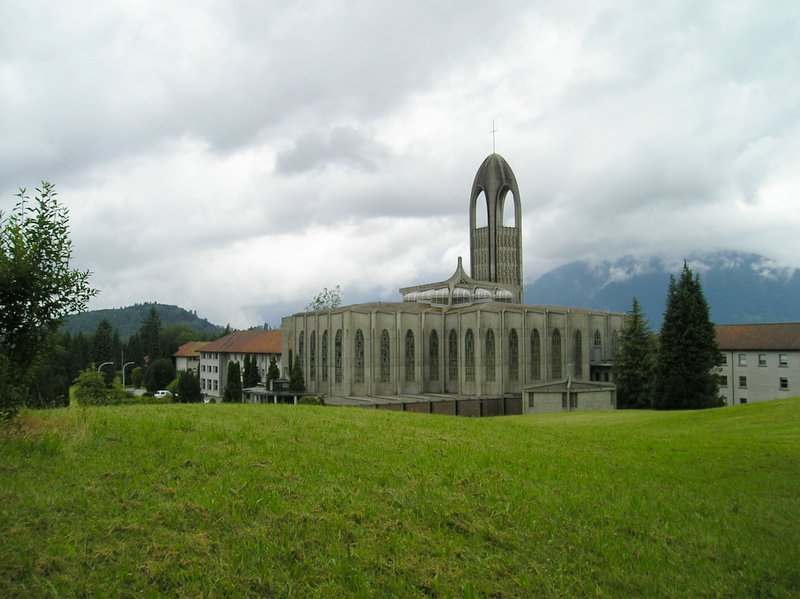
Church of Westminster Abbey at the Seminary of Christ the King

At present there are no Catholic universities, but, as per Archdiocesan Synod, there are plans to build one in the future.

College	City	Est.	Website	Enrollment
St. Mark's College (UBC)	Vancouver @ University of British Columbia	1956	http://www.stmarkscollege.ca/	~30 (co-ed)
Corpus Christi College (UBC)	Vancouver @ University of British Columbia		http://www.corpuschristi.ca/	(co-ed)
Catholic Pacific College	Walnut Grove Campus & Glover Road Campus in Langley, BC	1999	https://www.catholicpacific.ca/	(co-ed)
Seminary of Christ the King	Mission	1931	http://www.sck.ca/	(men only)

== Religious institutes ==
=== Religious communities of men ===
- Augustinians (O.S.A.)
- Basilians (C.S.B.)
- Benedictines (O.S.B.)
- Congregation of Christian Brothers (C.F.C.)
- Dominicans (O.P.)
- Franciscans (O.F.M.)
- Franciscan Friars of the Atonement (S.A.)
- Oblates (O.M.I.)
- Priestly Fraternity of St. Peter (F.S.S.P.)
- Redemptorists (C.Ss.R.)
- Salesians (S.D.B.)
- Salvatorians (S.D.S.)
- Scalabrinians (C.S.)

=== Religious communities of women ===
- Canossian Daughters of Charity (Fd.C.C.)
- Congregation of the Missionary Sisters of Jesus of Nazareth
- Congregation of Notre Dame (C.N.D.)
- Daughters of Mercy of the 3rd Order of St. Francis (C.F.M.)
- Daughters of St. Mary of Providence (D.S.M.P.)
- Dominican Contemplative Nuns (O.P.)
- Franciscan Missionary Sisters of Our Lady of Sorrows (O.S.F.)
- Franciscan Sisters of the Atonement (S.A.)
- Grey Sisters of the Immaculate Conception (G.S.I.C.)
- Missionaries of Charity (M.C.)
- Missionary Sisters of Christ the King (M.C.R.)
- Missionary Sisters of Immaculate Conception (M.I.C.)
- Order of St. Clare (O.S.C.)
- Religious of the Cenacle (rc.)
- Sisters of Charity of the Immaculate Conception (S.C.I.C.)
- Sisters of Charity of St. Louis (S.C.S.L.)
- Sisters of Charity of St. Vincent de Paul (Halifax) S.C.(H)
- Sisters of the Child Jesus (S.C.J.)
- Sisters of the Immaculate Heart of Mary (S.I.H.M.)
- Sisters of Providence (Montreal) (S.P.)
- Sisters of Providence of St. Vincent de Paul (S.P.)
- Sisters of St. Ann (S.S.A.)
- Sisters of St. Joseph of Peace (C.S.J.P.)
- Sisters of St. Joseph (Toronto) (C.S.J.)
- Sisters of St. Paul de Chartres (S.P.D.C.)
- Sisters Servants of Mary Immaculate (S.S.M.I.)
- Teresian Carmelite Missionaries (C.M.T.)

== Cemeteries ==
The Gardens of Gethsemani Cemetery & Mausoleum (Est. 1965), 15800 - 32nd Avenue, Surrey, B.C.

== Charitable organizations ==
Health care

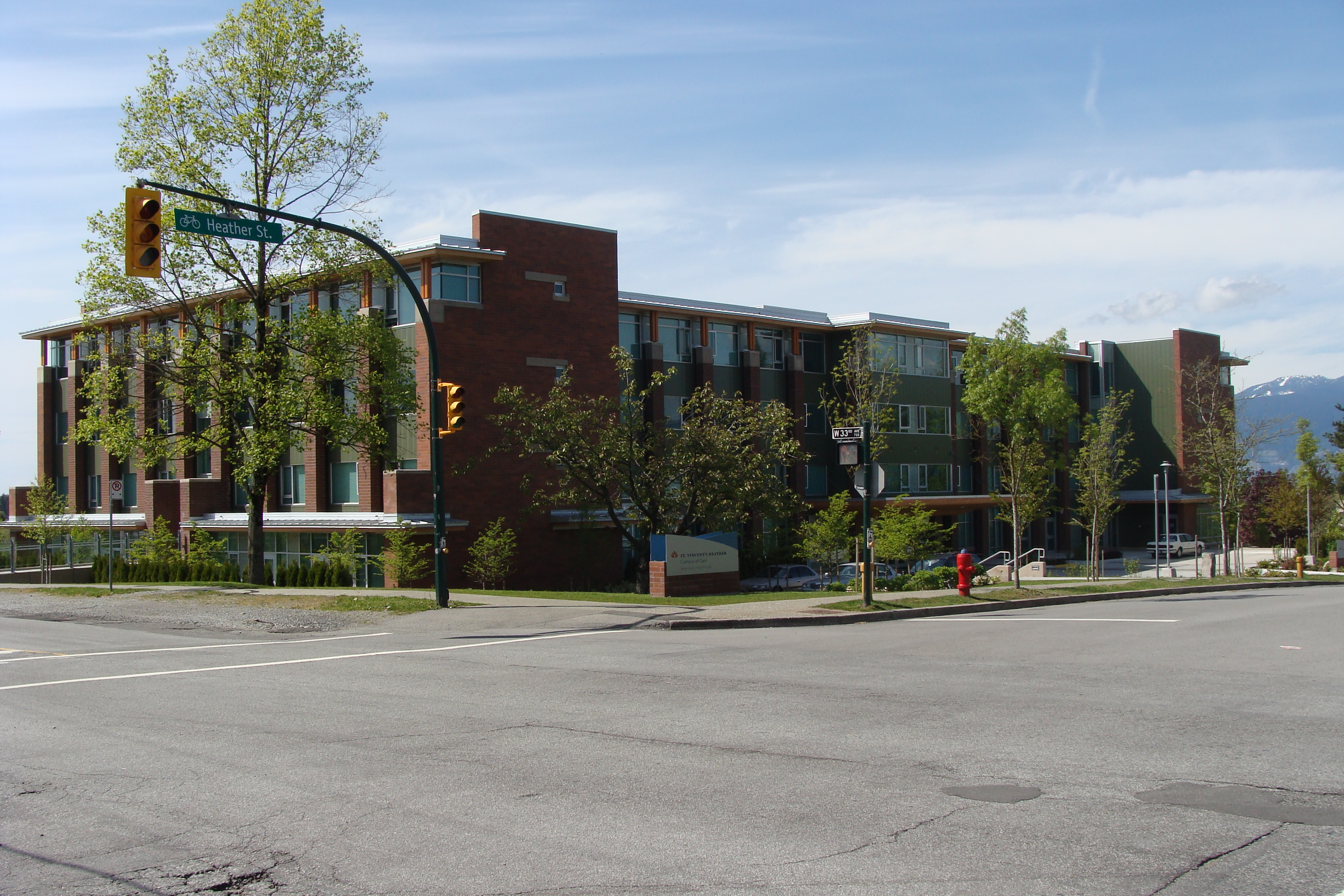
St. Vincent's Heather is built on the old site of St. Vincent's Hospital.

On March 31, 2000, St. Paul's Hospital, Holy Family Hospital, & CHARA Health Care Society were consolidated into one legal entity and formed Providence Health Care, with eight sites in the city of Vancouver.

Although the archdiocese is responsible for the creation of the hospitals and care facilities. It no long has direct control of these facilities as they are governed by a board of directors, the Congregation of Sisters & Providence Senior Leadership Team. Providence Health Care continues to provide Catholic health care.

Providence Health Care is presently developing the Legacy Project, which is to renew St. Paul's Hospital into a state-of-the-art research and teaching facility.

Hospital	City	Est.	Religious institute	Beds
St. Paul's Hospital (Vancouver)	Vancouver	1894	the Sisters of Providence	500
St. Vincent's Hospital (Vancouver)	Vancouver	1939	the Sisters of Charity	650
Mount Saint Joseph Hospital (1946)	Vancouver	1921	the Missionary Sisters	208
Holy Family Hospital	Vancouver	1947	the Sisters of Providence	218
Youville Residence	Vancouver	1931	the Grey Sisters	

Shelters

- Catholic Charities Men's Hostel - Emergency shelter for men.
- Columbus Towers - Low rent housing for seniors
- Missionaries of Charity - housing for single pregnant mothers.
- St. Michael's Centre - extended care beds & hospice beds. (144 beds)

Social support

- Apostleship of the Sea - Provides services to visiting international seafarers.
- Catholic Charities Justice Services - Prison visitation & re-integration programs.
- Society of St. Vincent de Paul - visiting the sick and assistance to families.
- The Door is Open - A safe drop-in centre for the homeless.

== Newspaper ==
The archdiocese publishes a monthly newspaper and weekly email digest called The B.C. Catholic (founded in 1931).

== See also ==
- List of Catholic dioceses in Canada
