= St. Andrew's Regional High School =

Location
- 880 McKenzie Avenue; Victoria, British Columbia, V8X 3G5; Canada; 48.46929°N 123.37416°W

Information
- School type: Independent
- Motto: To Build in Love
- Religious affiliation: Roman Catholic
- Founded: 1983
- School board: CISDV - Catholic Independent Schools of the Diocese of Victoria.
- Area trustee: (Archbishop's Representative)
- Principal: Patrick Niwa
- Grades: 8–12
- Enrollment: 380 (co-ed)
- Language: English
- Team name: Sabres
- Website: www.standrewshigh.ca

St. Andrew's, an independent co-educational Catholic High School of 380 Grade 8–12 students, serves young men and women in Greater Victoria.

== History ==
The school was founded in 1863 as St. Louis College, a Catholic boys' school taught by the Oblate Fathers. Initially located on Humboldt Street, it soon moved to a permanent location on Pandora Avenue, where it was the first brick building in Victoria. In 1915, responsibility for the school was given over to the Congregation of Christian Brothers. The Christian Brothers departed in 1968, at which point the school became co-educational and was renamed to St. Andrews School. In 1984 the school moved to its current location and became St. Andrew's Regional High School.

== Independent school status ==
St. Andrew's Regional High School is classified as a Group 1 school under British Columbia's Independent School Act. It receives 50% funding from the Ministry of Education. The school receives no funding for capital costs. It is under charge of the Catholic Independent Schools of the Roman Catholic Diocese of Victoria.

=== Feeder Parishes ===
- St. Joseph's (Victoria) Elementary
- St. Joseph's (Chemainus) Elementary
- St. Patrick's Elementary
- Queen of Angels School
- John Paul II School - Port Alberni

== Academic performance ==
St. Andrew's Regional is ranked by the Fraser Institute. In 2007, it is ranked 53rd out of 298 British Columbia high schools.

96.4% of the students graduate and 98% of those students pursue a post-secondary education.

=== Academic departments ===
- Mathematics
- Performing Arts
- Social Studies
- Catholic theology
- English
- Humanities
- Information technologies
- Languages
- Science
- Physical Education
- Visual Arts

== Athletic performance ==
=== School teams ===
- Soccer
- Volleyball
- Track & Field
- Basketball
- Cross Country
- Badminton
- Rowing
- Golf
- Swimming

== Artistic performance ==
=== Performing arts ===
- Drama
- Concert Choir
- Concert Band
- Jazz Band

=== Visual arts ===
- Art
- Photography
- Yearbook

== Notable alumni ==
- Dave Calder (2000), Canadian Olympic Team Rowing Medalist
- Shaun Sipos (2000), Actor (Melrose Place, ER, Southland, CSI: Miami, Smallville).
- Fraser MacPherson (1946), Jazz Musician
