= Diocese of Whitehorse =

Catholic ecclesiastical territory

Coordinates: 60.7197°N 135.0520°W

Diocese of Whitehorse Dioecesis Equialbensis

Location
- Country: Canada
- Ecclesiastical province: Grouard–McLennan
- Population: 9,300 (22.1%)

Information
- Denomination: Catholic
- Sui iuris church: Latin Church
- Rite: Roman Rite
- Cathedral: Sacred Heart Cathedral

Current leadership
- Pope: Leo XIV
- Bishop: Hector Vila
- Metropolitan Archbishop: Charles Duval, C.Ss.R.

Map

Website
- whitehorsediocese.ca

The Roman Catholic Diocese of Whitehorse (Latin: Dioecesis Equialbensis) is a Latin Church ecclesiastical territory or diocese of the Catholic Church that includes Yukon and the northern portion of British Columbia north of latitude 57 degrees.

As of 2003, the diocese contains 23 parishes, 4 active diocesan priests, 9 religious priests, and 9,000 Catholics. It also has 8 women religious, 10 religious brothers, and 1 permanent deacon. The Diocese of Whitehorse is a suffragan diocese in the ecclesiastical province of the metropolitan Archdiocese of Grouard-McLennan.

== Bishops ==
=== Diocesan bishops ===
The following is a list of the vicars apostolic and bishops of Whitehorse, and their terms of service:

- Émile-Marie Bunoz, O.M.I. (1908–1944, appointed Vicar Apostolic of Prince Rupert, British Columbia
- Jean-Louis-Antoine-Joseph Coudert, O.M.I. (1944–1965)
- James Philip Mulvihill (1965-1967 as Vicar Apostolic; 1967–1971)
- Hubert Patrick O'Connor (1971–1986), appointed Bishop of Prince George, British Columbia
- Thomas Joseph Lobsinger (1987–2000)
- Gary Gordon (2006–2014), appointed Bishop of Victoria, British Columbia
- Hector Vila (2015–present)

=== Coadjutor bishop ===
- Jean-Louis-Antoine-Joseph Coudert, O.M.I. (1936–1944), as Coadjutor Vicar Apostolic
