= Maurice Baudoux =

Canadian priest (1902–1988)

The Most Reverend Maurice Baudoux OC
- Archbishop of Saint Boniface
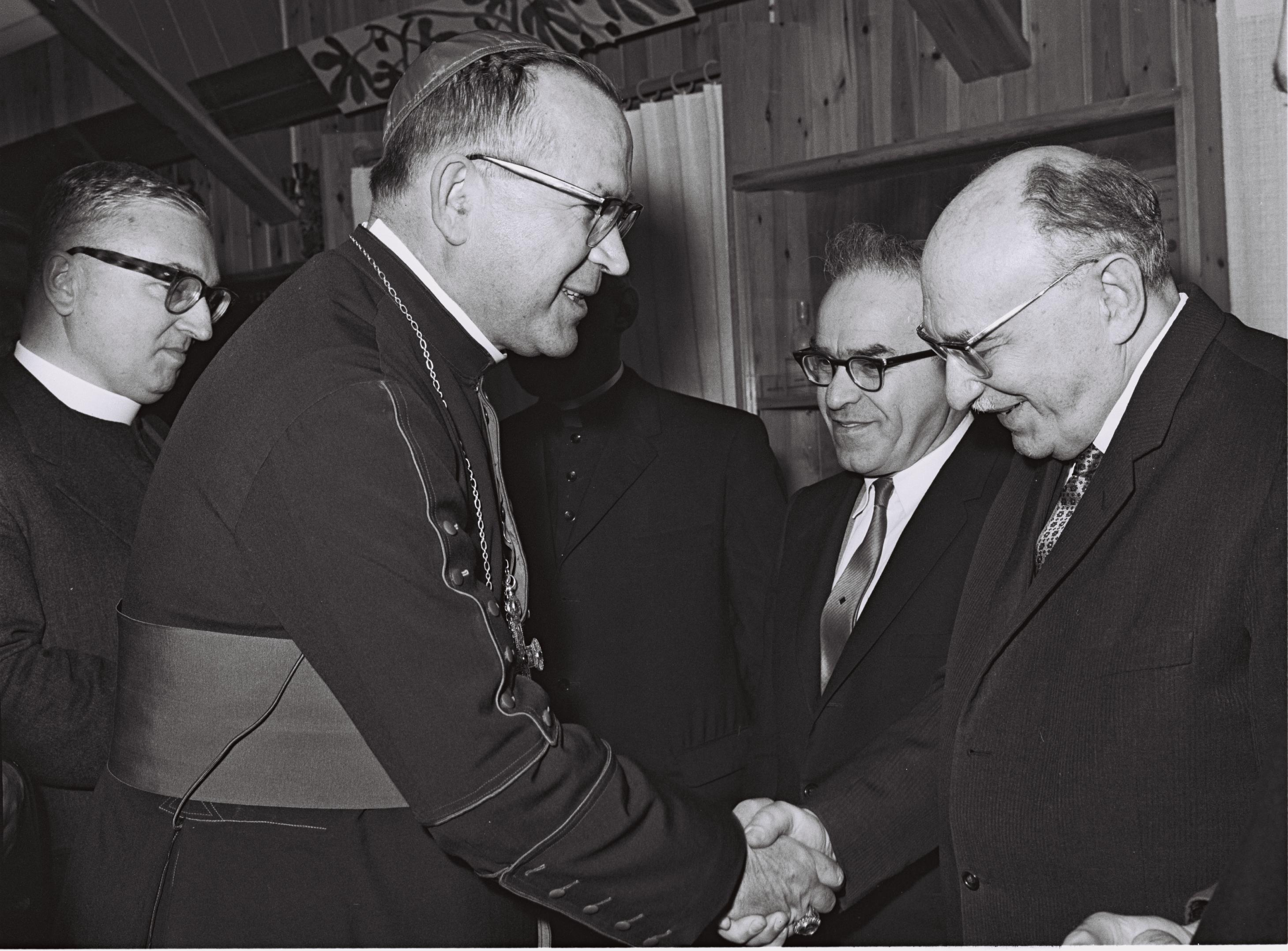
- Badoux with Israeli President Zalman Shazar during a visit to Israel in 1964
- Archdiocese: Saint Boniface
- Installed: 1955
- Term ended: 1974
- Predecessor: Arthur Béliveau
- Successor: Antoine Hacault
- Other post: Bishop of Saint Paul in Alberta (1948-1952)

Personal details
- Born: July 10, 1902 La Louvière, Belgium
- Died: July 1, 1988 (aged 85)

Maurice Baudoux OC (July 10, 1902 – July 1, 1988) was a Canadian priest and the Archbishop of Saint Boniface, Manitoba, Canada.

Born in La Louvière, Belgium, he moved to Canada when he was nine. He studied at Collège universitaire de Saint-Boniface, an Edmonton seminary, and at Université Laval where he received his doctorate in theology. He was ordained in 1929 and was a Priest in Prud'homme, Saskatchewan. From 1948 to 1952, he was the first Bishop of Saint Paul, Alberta. He became Archbishop of Saint-Boniface in 1955. He resigned in 1974.

In 1979, he was made an Officer of the Order of Canada "in recognition of the fifty years he devoted to the promotion of the French fact in western Canada through his work with many religious, cultural and educational organizations". In 1980, he was awarded an honorary Doctor of Laws from the University of Saskatchewan.
