= The B.C. Catholic =

Catholic news publication in British Columbia

- Publisher: Archdiocese of Vancouver
- Founded: August 15, 1931
- Headquarters: Vancouver, British Columbia, Canada
- Website: bccatholic.ca

The B.C. Catholic is a Catholic news publication owned by the Roman Catholic Archdiocese of Vancouver. Founded in 1931, it was published as a weekly newspaper until 2026, when it transitioned to a model consisting of a monthly print edition, weekly email digest, website and social media channels.

== History ==
The B.C. Catholic was established by Archbishop William Mark Duke and published its first issue on August 15, 1931. The publication was originally described as the "Official Organ of the Archdiocese of Vancouver" and sold for five cents per copy.

It followed several earlier Catholic publications in British Columbia, including The Month, published from 1892 until approximately 1916; The B.C. Western Catholic, published from 1909 to 1919; and The Bulletin, published from 1924 until 1931.

The newspaper began publishing stories online in 1998. In 2001, it began distributing an electronic edition by email, which the publication describes as the first electronic edition of a Catholic newspaper in North America. An updated digital edition was introduced in 2013.

=== 2026 transition ===
In June 2026, The B.C. Catholic announced that it would end weekly newspaper publication and transition to a new print and digital model. The final weekly edition was published on June 29, 2026. A weekly email digest began in July, followed by a redesigned monthly print edition in September.

As part of the transition, the publication also introduced a redesigned website and expanded its use of digital and social media platforms.

== Awards and recognition ==
The B.C. Catholic has received awards from Catholic and Christian media organizations in Canada and the United States. In 2025, the Canadian Christian Communicators Association awarded the publication first place for general excellence among Canadian Christian newspapers.

In 2026, The B.C. Catholic placed second for best diocesan newspaper in the Catholic Media Awards. Its journalists also received awards for reporting, analysis, photography and editorial writing.

== See also ==
- Roman Catholic Archdiocese of Vancouver
- Canadian Catholic News
- Catholic Media Association
