= Modeste Demers =

Canadian Roman Catholic Bishop and missionary

His Excellency, the Most Reverend Modeste Demers
- Bishop of Vancouver Island
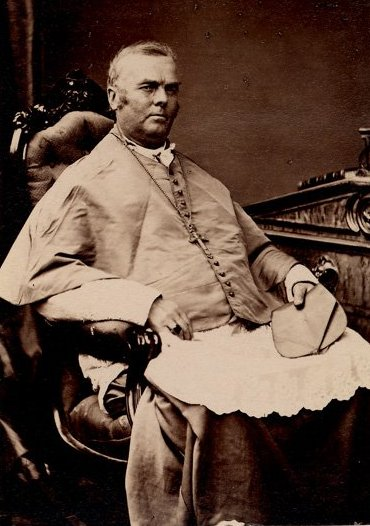
- Province: Oregon City
- Diocese: Vancouver Island
- Appointed: July 28, 1846
- Installed: November 30, 1847
- Term ended: July 28, 1871
- Successor: Charles John Seghers

Orders
- Ordination: February 7, 1836 by Joseph Signay
- Consecration: November 30, 1847 by François Norbert Blanchet

Personal details
- Born: October 11, 1809 Saint-Nicholas-de-Lévis, Lower Canada (present-day Quebec)
- Died: July 28, 1871 (aged 61) Victoria, British Columbia
- Buried: St. Andrew's Cathedral
- Denomination: Roman Catholic
- Parents: Michel Demers & Rosalie Foucher
- Education: Séminaire de Québec

Modeste Demers (11 October 1809 – 28 July 1871) was a Roman Catholic Bishop and missionary in the Oregon Country. A native of Quebec, he traveled overland to the Pacific Northwest and preached in the Willamette Valley and later in what would become British Columbia.

== Early life ==
Modeste Demers was born 11 October 1809, in Saint-Nicolas, Quebec, in Lower Canada. Of French descent, he studied at the seminary of Quebec and was ordained on February 7, 1836 by Archbishop Joseph Signay. After becoming a priest in 1836, he left the following year to be a missionary at the Red River Colony. There he worked under the direction of Bishop Joseph-Norbert Provencher. His stay there was short and he traveled to the Oregon Country with François Norbert Blanchet to perform his duties as a priest and missionary. (See St. Paul's Mission.)

== Oregon Country ==
In 1838, Demers arrived with Blanchet in the Willamette Valley of what would become the U.S. state of Oregon. Demers quickly became immersed in the work with the local trading post staff and the Chinookan nation. For the Chinooks, he quickly learned the language and worked on a dictionary, a catechism, a prayer book, and hymns in that language. In 1844, he became the first priest at Oregon City.

== British Columbia ==
Demers's work carried him north to present day British Columbia where his knowledge of the French and English languages, and his affinity for native languages allowed him to continue his mission. In 1847, Demers was consecrated Bishop of Vancouver Island by Bishop François Norbert Blanchet of Oregon City and also appointed apostolic administrator of the Queen Charlotte Islands and New Caledonia (Canada). It was a diocese which lacked funds and priests and was largely unexposed to Christianity. He worked tirelessly, traveling to raise funds and acquire new priests. As well, he struggled with health problems during his last years.

One of his friends was Sir James Douglas who was governor of Vancouver Island and British Columbia and the head of the Hudson's Bay Company operations in the Columbia District. Demers and Douglas had met when Demers had first arrived at Fort Vancouver. They had interacted in this small colony which was replaced by a much larger and modern society during Demers tenure.

He died on 28 July 1871. Modeste Demers, the first Bishop of Victoria, is interred in the crypt of that city's St. Andrew's Cathedral.
