= Gary Gordon (bishop) =

Canadian Roman Catholic bishop (born 1957)

His Excellency, The Most Reverend Gary Michael Gordon
- Bishop of Victoria
- Church: Roman Catholic Church
- Province: Vancouver
- See: Victoria
- Appointed: June 14, 2014
- Installed: August 28, 2014
- Predecessor: Richard Gagnon
- Previous post: Bishop of Whitehorse (2006–2014)

Orders
- Ordination: May 22, 1982 by James Carney
- Consecration: March 22, 2006 by Raymond Roussin

Personal details
- Born: June 10, 1957 (age 69) St. Paul's Hospital, Vancouver, British Columbia, Canada
- Denomination: Roman Catholic
- Residence: Victoria
- Education: Seminary of Christ the King; St. Jerome College, University of Waterloo; St. Peter's Seminary
- Motto: Communio (English: "Communion")
- Coat of arms: Gary Michael Gordon's coat of arms

Styles of Gary Michael Gordon
- Reference style: His Excellency; The Most Reverend
- Spoken style: Your Excellency
- Religious style: Bishop

Ordination history of Gary Gordon
History
Priestly ordination
- Ordained by: James Carney
Episcopal consecration
- Principal consecrator: Raymond Roussin
- Co-consecrators: David Monroe; Denis Croteau

Gary M. Gordon (born June 10, 1957) is a Canadian Roman Catholic bishop. Ordained to the priesthood on May 22, 1982, Gordon was named bishop of the Roman Catholic Diocese of Victoria in Canada in 2014.

== Early life ==
Born on June 10, 1957, at St. Paul's Hospital, Vancouver, British Columbia, and raised in Burnaby, Gordon studied at the Seminary of Christ the King, Mission, B.C.; at St. Jerome College, University of Waterloo, Ontario; and at St. Peter's Seminary, London, Ontario. He was ordained to the priesthood on May 22, 1982, for the Archdiocese of Vancouver, and served several parishes throughout British Columbia, including Vancouver, Chilliwack and Mission. He spent most of his time as a diocesan priest working with First Nations People.

Gordon also served as the Pacific regional representative of the Canadian Conference of Catholic Bishops (CCCB) with the Interfaith Committee on Chaplaincy of the Correctional Service of Canada (1994-2006), and was the CCCB principal liaison and spokesperson on the Interfaith Committee (2002-2006).

== Bishop ==
Gordon was named Bishop of Whitehorse on January 5, 2006. Since 2007, Gordon has been the CCCB Bishop ponens for Catholics involved in prison chaplaincy and pastoral services.

In addition, he has been Chairman of the CCCB Standing Committee for Relations with Movements and Associations since 2011, after previously serving on the former Episcopal Commission for Relations with Associations of Clergy, Consecrated Life and Laity (2007-2008). He has been a member of the Anglican/Roman Catholic Bishops' Dialogue since 2007, and became its Co-Chairman in 2009.

On Saturday, June 14, 2014, Pope Francis named Gary Gordon as Bishop of Victoria. At the time of his appointment, he was Bishop of Whitehorse, Yukon. Bishop Gordon succeeded Bishop Richard Gagnon, who was appointed Archbishop of Winnipeg on October 28, 2013. Gagnon served as Apostolic Administrator of Victoria until he was installed as Archbishop of Winnipeg on January 3, 2014. Until Bishop Gordon's installation, John Laszczyk was Diocesan Administrator of Victoria. (Canadian Conference of Catholic Bishops)

Installation Mass for Bishop Gordon was held on Thursday, August 28, 2014, at St. Andrew's Cathedral in downtown Victoria. Over 50 priests and many bishops from across the country and especially Western Canada were present. Archbishop Michael Miller of Vancouver and Archbishop Luigi Bonazzi, the Apostolic Nuncio, also attended.

Catholic Church titles
Vacant Title last held by Thomas Lobsinger	Bishop of Whitehorse; 2006–2014	Succeeded by Héctor Vila
Preceded by Richard Gagnon	Bishop of Victoria; 2014–present	Incumbent
