= Blondeau =

Blondeau is a French surname. Notable people with the surname include:

- Auguste Blondeau (1786–1863), French violinist and composer
- Charles Bruno Blondeau (1835–1888), Canadian politician and contractor
- Gustav Blondeau (1871–1965), co-founder of early aircraft manufacturer Hewlett & Blondeau
- Jean-Yves Blondeau (born 1970), inventor the 32-wheel roller suit
- Nicolas Blondeau (1955–2026), French riding instructor and author
- Patrick Blondeau (born 1968), international footballer
- Peter Blondeau (died 1672), French moneyer and engineer
- Thérèse Blondeau (1913–2013), French swimmer
- Thomas Blondeau (1978–2013), Belgian writer and journalist
- Thylane Blondeau (born 2001), French model and actress

== See also ==
- Blondeau River (disambiguation)
- Blondel (disambiguation)
