= Blondin (disambiguation) =

Blondin was a French tightrope walker.

Blondin may also refer to:

- Blondin (surname), a surname (and list of people with the name)
- Blondin (quarry equipment)

== See also ==
- Blondel (disambiguation)
- Blondine (disambiguation)
