= Blondel =

Blondel may refer to:

- Apostilb, an old unit of luminance
- Blondel (surname)
- Blondel de Nesle (c. 1155 – 1202), French trouvère, or poet
- Jean-François Blondel (1683–1756), French architect
- Maurice Blondel (1861–1949), French philosopher
- Vincent Blondel (born 1965), Belgian applied mathematician
- Amazing Blondel, an English progressive folk band
  - Blondel (album), a 1973 album by the band
- Blondel (musical), a rock opera

== See also ==
- Blondell, a surname and given name
- Blondeau, a French surname
- Blondin (disambiguation)
