= Comic-Finance =

French weekly newspaper

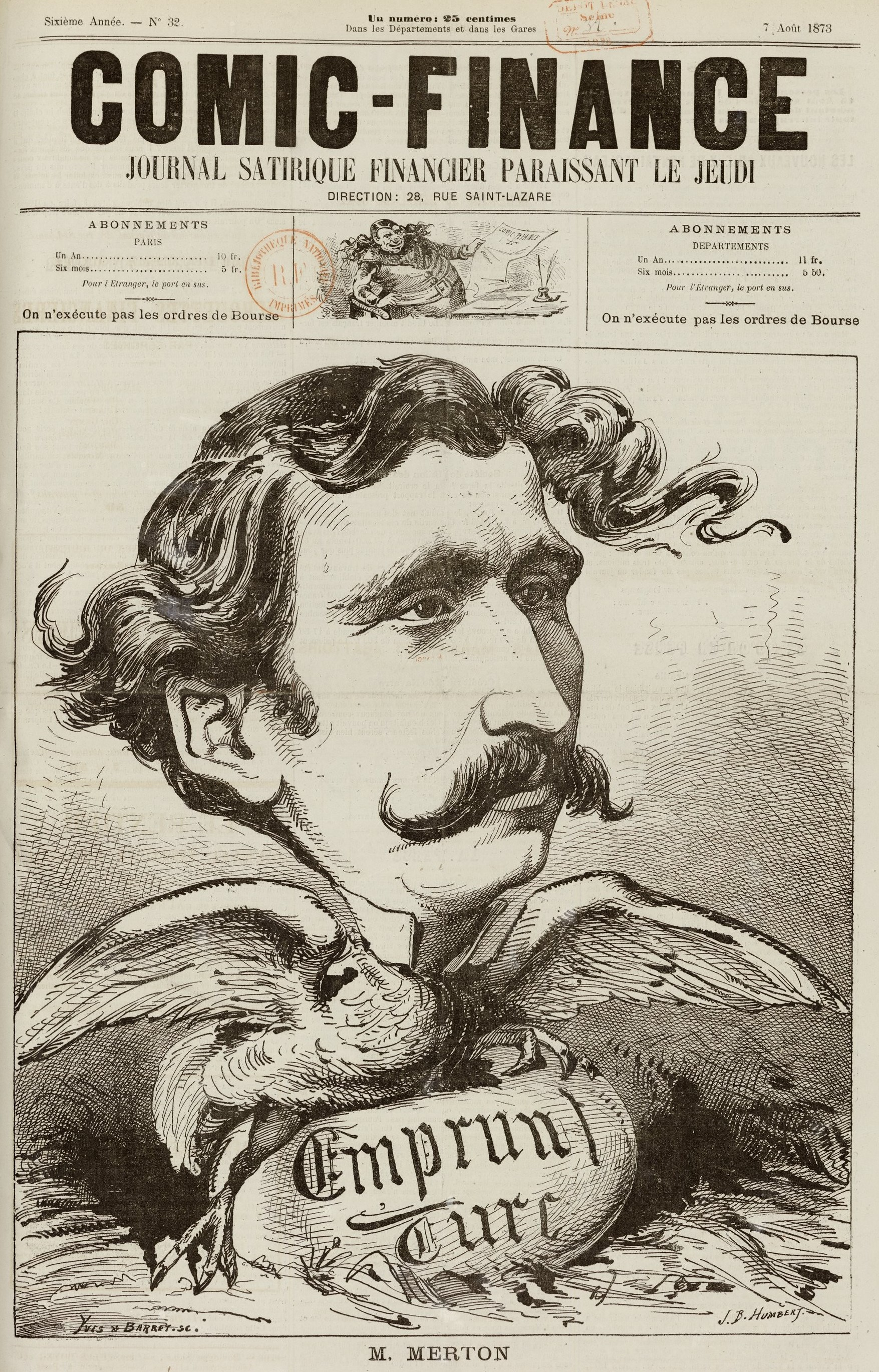
- Caricature of Louis Merton by J B Humbert on the front page of the 7 August 1873 issue
- Type: Weekly newspaper
- Format: Folio
- Editor: Ernest Schrameck (1844–1911)
- Founded: 15 October 1868
- Ceased publication: 25 November 1937
- Headquarters: Paris
- Country: France
- Circulation: 1,000 (in 1877)
- ISSN: 2020-7611

Le Comic-Finance was a French illustrated satirical and financial weekly newspaper, published in Paris, France from 1868 to 1937. It was edited from 1868 to 1911 by Ernest Schrameck (1844–1911), who wrote under the pseudonym "Sergines".

Comic-Finance was published weekly, on Thursdays. It included humorous articles, and caricatures of prominent businessmen, as well as serious news articles on financial matters.

Some of the illustrated biographical pieces published in Comic-Finance were republished in bound volumes by its editor-in-chief (Sergines, Silhouettes financières, 4 volumes, Paris, 1872–1874).

In 1877, Comic-Finance's circulation was estimated at 1,000 copies according to a police report.

One of the newspaper's main contributors was Edmond Benjamin. In 1879, he left Comic-Finance to found La Finance pour rire, whose banner and thumbnails were illustrated by another former contributor to Comic-Finance, the designer E Doré.

Publication of Comic-Finance was temporarily interrupted during the Franco-German War of 1870, the Paris Commune in 1871 and the First World War (1914–18). It appeared fortnightly or monthly from 1920 until 1937, when it ceased publication.

== Contributors ==
- Edmond Benjamin
- Bertall
- Cham
- Édouard Dangin
- Henri Demare
- E Doré
- A Farchi
- Charles Friedlander (alias "Jacques Profit")
- J B Humbert
- Louis-Ernest Lesage (alias "Sahib")
- Claude Guillaumin (alias "Pépin")
- Pierretti

== Gallery ==
Caricatures published in Comic-Finance

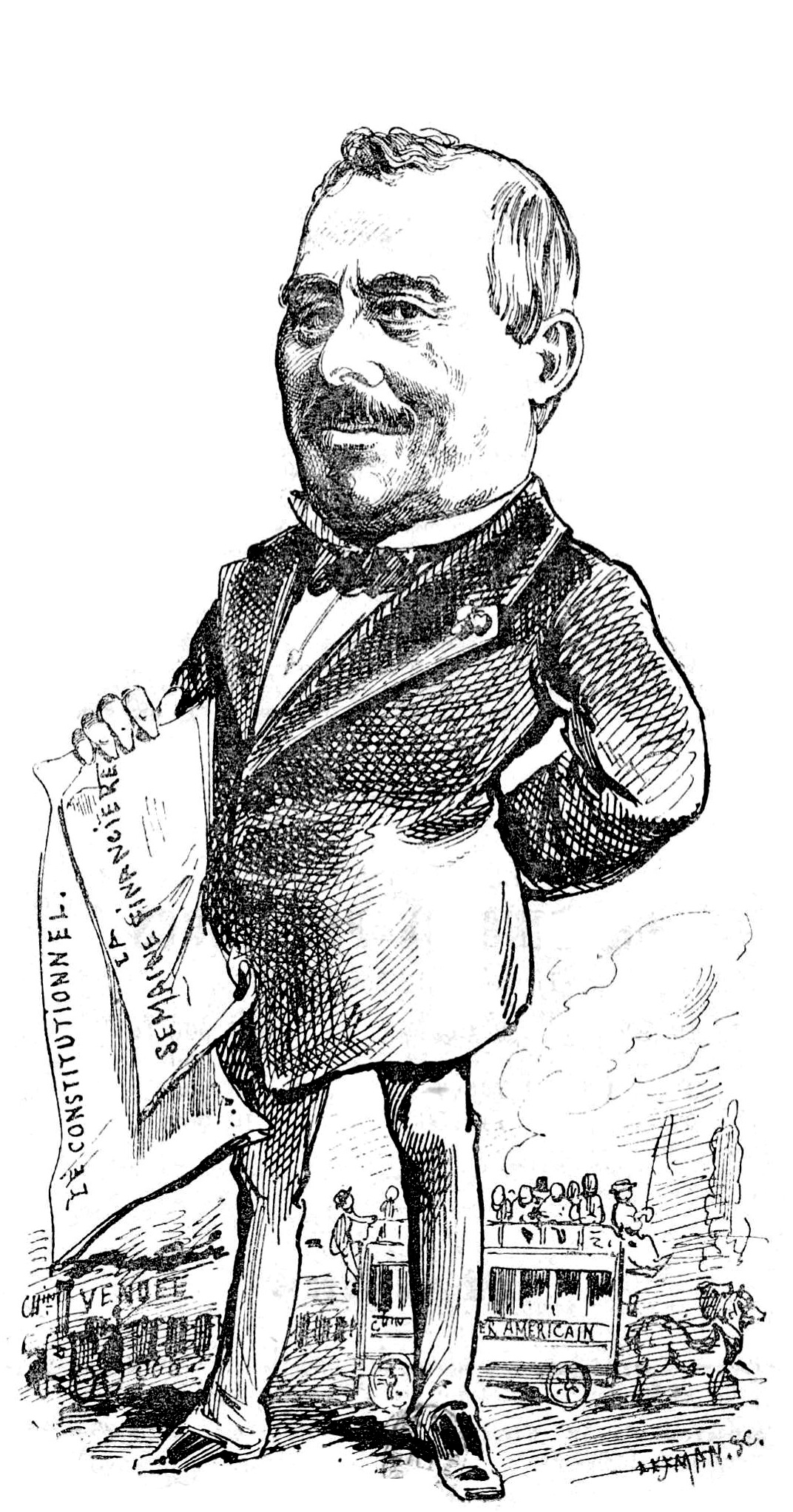
Caricature of Eugène Gibiat by Claude Guillaumin ("Pépin") in the 13 February 1873 issue

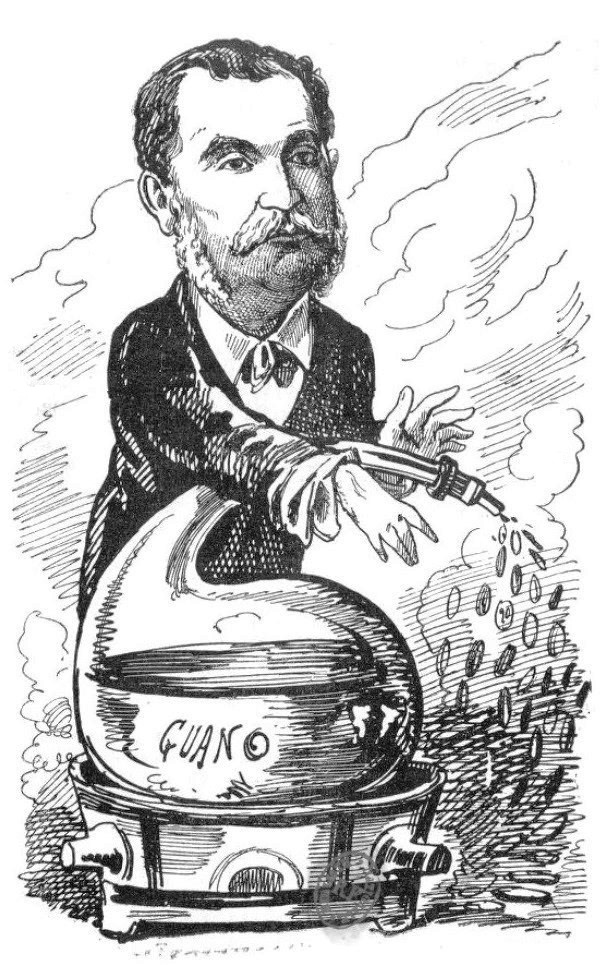
Caricature of Auguste Dreyfus by Claude Guillaumin ("Pépin") in the 10 April 1873 issue

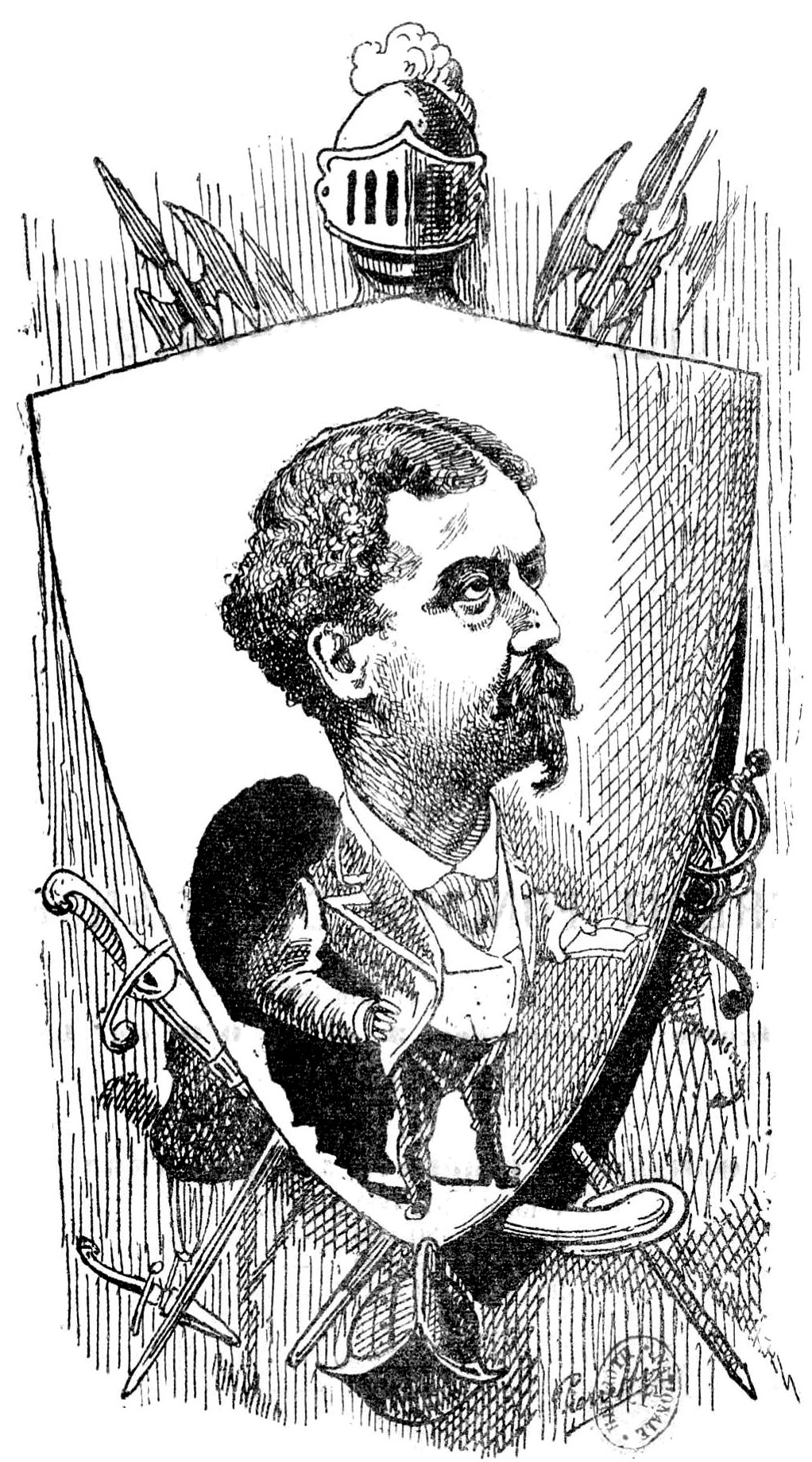
Caricature of Edmond Dollfus by "Pierretti" in the 5 June 1873 issue

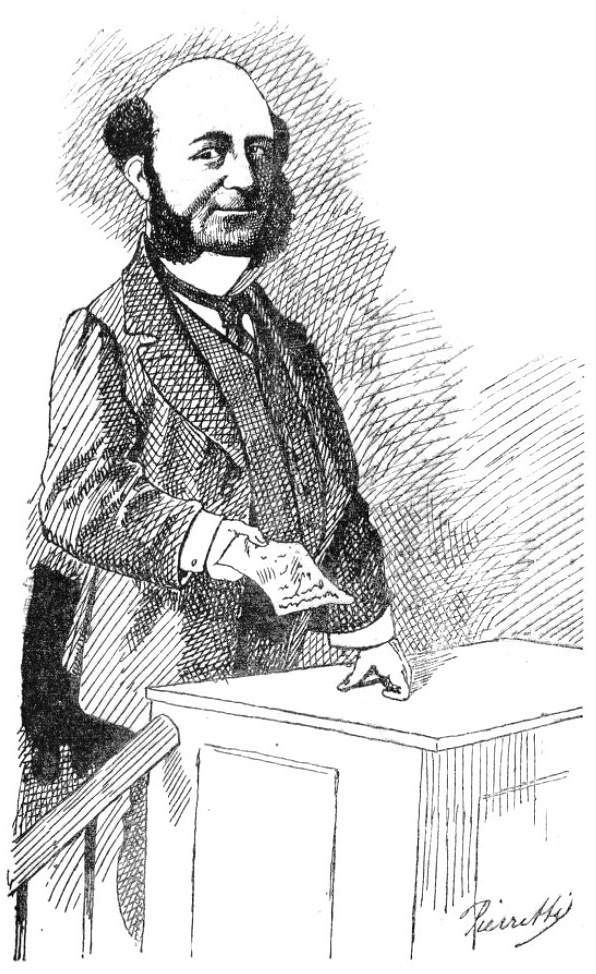
Caricature of Alfred André by "Pierretti" in the 17 July 1873 issue

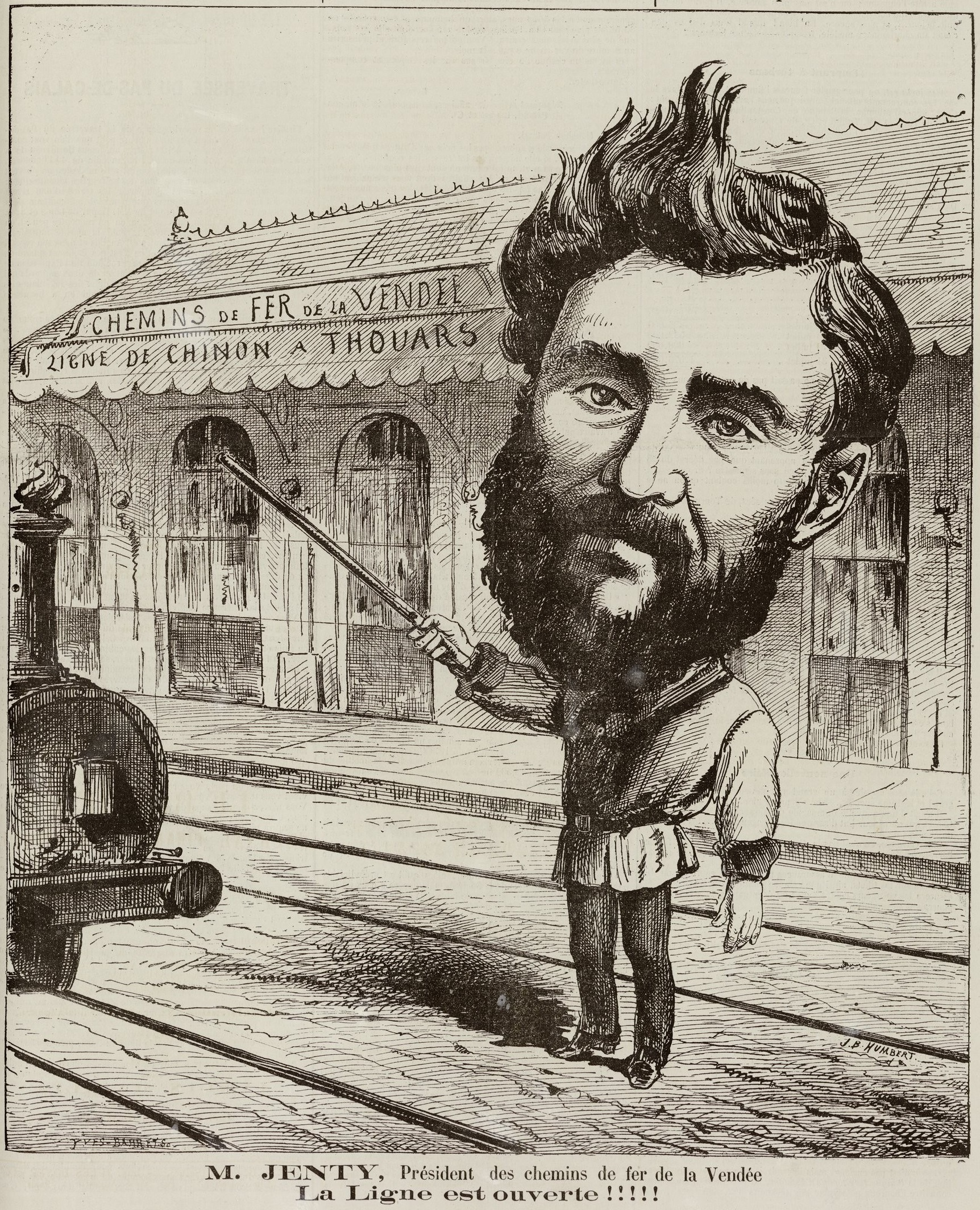
Caricature of Charles Jenty by J B Humbert in the 14 August 1873 issue

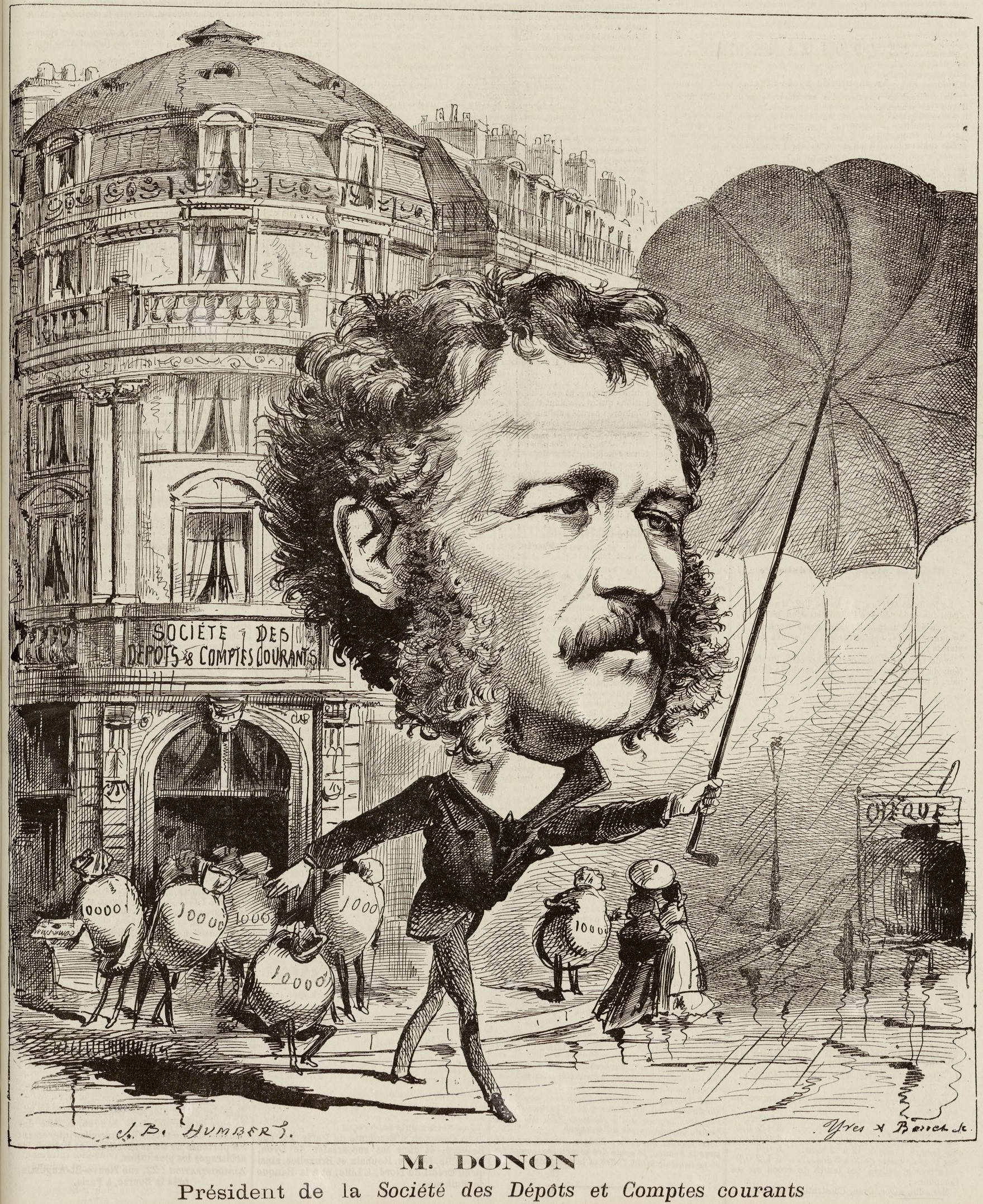
Caricature of Armand Donon, President of the Société des Dépôts et Comptes Courants, by J B Humbert in the 23 October 1873 issue

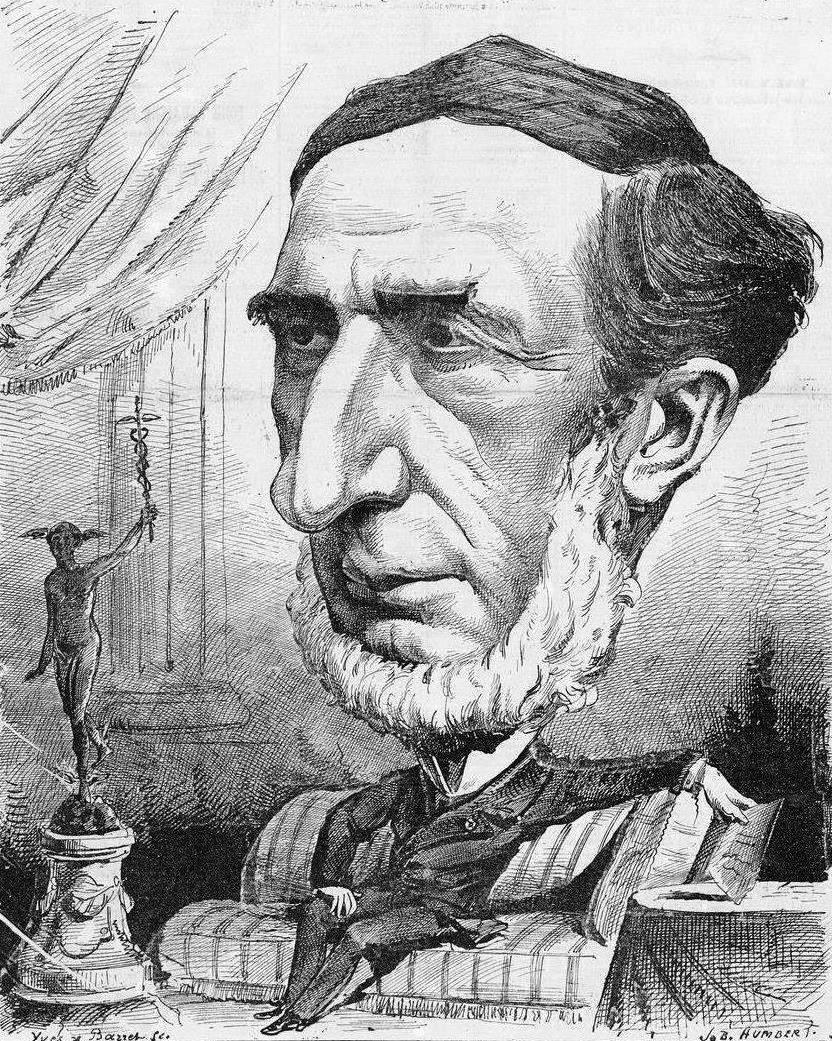
Caricature of Alexandre de Ploeuc, Deputy governor of the Bank of France, in the 30 October 1873 issue

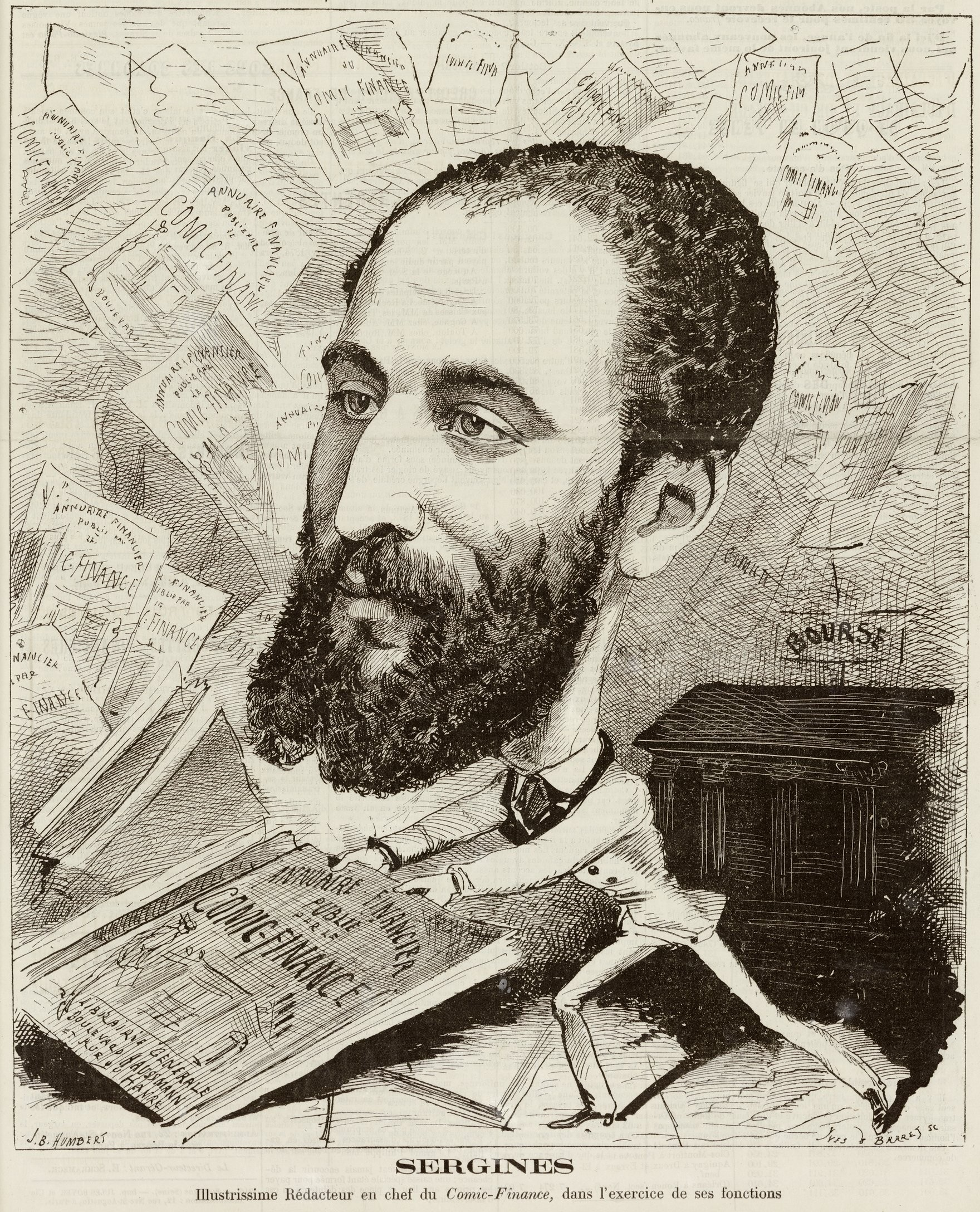
Caricature of "Sergines" (Ernest Schrameck, editor of Comic-Finance) by J B Humbert in the 26 December 1873 issue

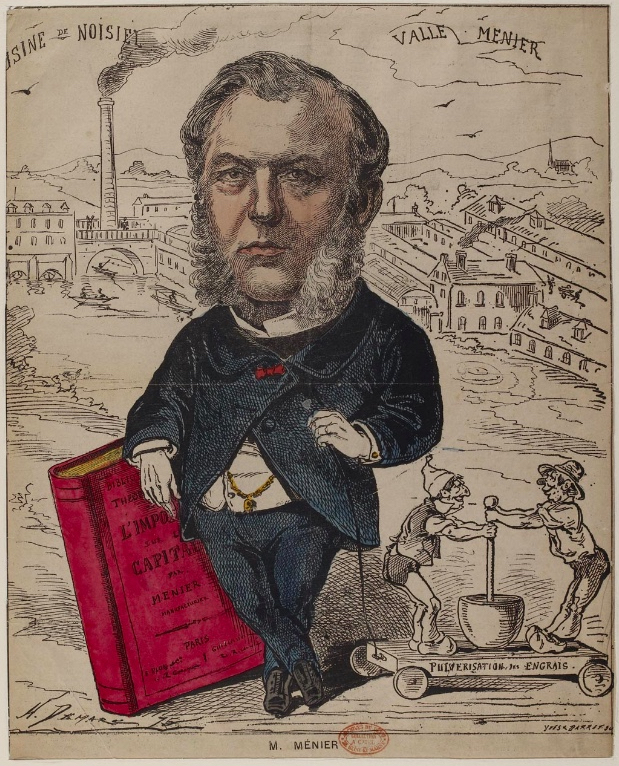
Caricature of Émile-Justin Menier by Henri Demare in the 9 September 1875 issue

== Sources ==
- Grand-Carteret, John (1868). Les Mœurs et la caricature en France, Paris: Librairie illustrée, p. 572 (available online at the Internet Archive).
