= Blondel (surname) =

Blondel is a surname. Notable people with the surname include:

- Alain Blondel (born 1939), retired French art dealer
- Alain Blondel (born 1962), retired French decathlete
- André Blondel (1863–1938), French scientist and engineer
- Antoine Blondel (1795–1886), French politician
- David Blondel (1591–1655), French Protestant clergyman and scholar
- François Blondel (1618–1686), French mathematician and engineer, author of Cours d'Architecture
- Georges Blondel (1856–1948), French historian
- Henri Blondel (1821–1897), French architect
- Jacques-François Blondel (1705–1774), French architect
- James Augustus Blondel, French physician
- Jean Blondel (1929–2022), French political scientist
- Jean-François Blondel (1683–1756), French architect
- Jonathan Blondel (born 1984), Belgian footballer
- Louis Blondel (1885–1967), Swiss archaeologist
- Lucas Blondel (born 1996), Swiss-Argentine footballer
- Maurice Blondel (1861–1949), French Catholic philosopher
- Vincent Blondel (born 1965), Belgian professor of applied mathematics
