= Kitabgi =

Antoine Kitabgi Khan
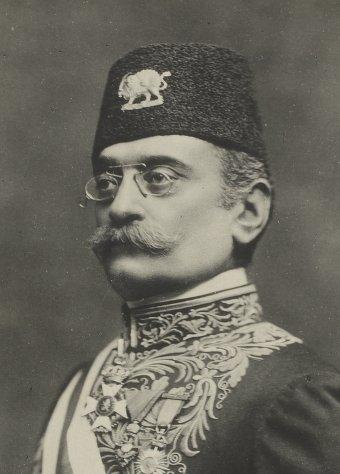
- Kitabgi in 1900
- Born: October 2, 1843; Constantinople, Ottoman Empire
- Died: December 20, 1902 (aged 59); Livorno, Kingdom of Italy
- Burial place: Montparnasse Cemetery

Antoine Kitabgi Khan (Note: Persian: آنتوان کتابچی‌ خان) (October 2, 1843, Constantinople – December 20, 1902, Livorno) was a Persian general who was director general of customs in Persia from 1881 to 1893 and initiated important concessions during the reigns of Naser al-Din Shah Qajar (r. 1848–1896) and his successor Mozaffar ad-Din Shah Qajar (r. 1896–1907). He was in particular the initiator of the oil concession granted in 1901 to William Knox D'Arcy which gave birth to BP.

== Constantinople ==
A Catholic, Antoine Kitabgi was born in 1843 in Constantinople to an Armenian family of Georgian origin. He was the second child and first son of a sibling group of six. His father, Vincent Kitabgi, was a supplier of gem-embellished water pipes to the sultan. Around the age of 14, Kitabgi was sent to Livorno, Italy, to complete his studies. There he learned Italian and French, which he spoke fluently in addition to Armenian and Turkish. His father being sick and unable to work, he returned to Constantinople in 1861 and was hired at the age of 18 at the Maritime Messenger Agency. In 1866, he was employed and later became a partner in the Armenian Ruben Hocozian cloth and drapery business and three years later founded his own cloth, drapery and carpet business. In 1870, he married Philomene Altounian, an Armenian Catholic woman whose parents came from the New Julfa district of Esfahan in Persia. Three boys, Vincent, Paul and Edward, were born in Constantinople from this union. Kitabgi's business prospered rapidly. He became the official supplier to the Sultan's tailor and began to diversify his business. He began selling arms, obtaining representation from major European firms and the position of arms supplier to the War Ministry. In 1874, in association with the Armenian Serkissian, he created a mechanical sawmill company in Bulgaria, then an Ottoman province.

But in 1876, serious unrest broke out in the Ottoman Empire. For several years, the European provinces of the Balkans had been in rebellion against the Empire. After Herzegovina, it was Bulgaria's turn to revolt in April 1876. As a consequence of these troubles and the bankruptcy of the Ottoman Empire in front of its creditors, Sultan Abdülaziz abdicated on May 30, 1876. His successor and nephew, Mourad V, was interned for insanity three months later. He was replaced by his brother Abdülhamid II, who, through the bloody repression of the Bulgarian insurrection of April 1876, led Russia to declare war on Turkey on 24 April 1877 (Russo-Turkish war of 1877-1878).

As a result of these events, Kitabgi's business was threatened with bankruptcy: the mechanical sawmill company was burnt down and looted by Bulgarian rebels in 1876; the brutal changes of sultans and governments caused him to lose its position as a client of the sultan's tailor and as an arms supplier to the War Ministry. The war slowed down trade. In October 1877, he was forced to leave for Europe to negotiate his debts with his German, Belgian and French suppliers and creditors.

== Paris and the railway concession in Persia ==
In Paris, he met Persian dignitaries in 1878 who were busy preparing the arrival of Shah Nassereddin in France for the 1878 World's Fair. They were Nazare Aga, Minister Plenipotentiary of Persia in Paris, General Neriman Khan, the Shah's aide-de-camp, and Mirza Hosein Khan Moshir od-Dowleh, the Shah's Prime Minister. These dignitaries convinced him to request a railway concession from the Shah to build a line from Rasht to Tehran. Associated with the banker Antoine Alléon, former director of the Ottoman Imperial Bank in Constantinople and recently retired in Normandy in Caen, Kitabgi obtained the railway concession from the Shah in December 1878. With Alléon, he then undertook to form a syndicate of French bankers and financiers composed, among others, of Armand Donon, chairman of the Société des Dépôts et Comptes Courants, and Paul Eugène Bontoux, chairman of the Union générale. In July 1879, Kitabgi joined General Neriman Khan in Vienna, who had been appointed the previous year Minister Plenipotentiary of Persia in Austria. Assisted by the General, Kitabgi prepared his departure for Persia and in August 1879 he left Europe with his family and the Austrian engineer Scherzer and his two assistants. He arrived in Tehran two months later. The engineers began surveying the railway line, but the project met with opposition from the Russians and the British and, under pressure from both powers, the Shah cancelled the concession in March 1880.

== Tehran and the directorship of Persian customs ==
Kitabgi decided to stay in Tehran and, after difficult negotiations concerning his salary, he accepted in 1881 the post of Director General of Persian Customs. His chief at the time was Agha Mohammed Ibrahim who bore the title of Amin al-Soltan and who, although not officially a minister, played an important role at the court of the Shah and controlled, among other things, the finances of the state. On Agha Ibrahim's death in July 1883, it was his son Mirza Ali Asghar Khan, Emin ul-Mulk, who took over his father's title, Amin al-Soltan, and the latter's functions, thus becoming the new ruler of Kitabgi.

The position of Director General of Customs was of particular importance, since taxes on imports and exports were a major source of revenues of the Persian state. In 1881, the year Kitabgi took office, net customs revenue for the treasury was 550,000 tomans (about 5,500,000 Fr at the time). In 1882 these revenues rose to 730,000 tomans, then 780,000 tomans in 1883 and 825,000 tomans in 1884. The evolution is slower afterwards. When Kitabgi left his position as Director General of Customs in 1893, the net income was 911,650 tomans.

These good results earned Kitabgi the Order of the Lion and the Sun and in 1887 he obtained the lease of the customs of the province of Tehran. It was also in that year that, although he did not hold any military office, he received from the Shah the rank of honorary general and the title of Khan in recognition of his services. It was Amin al-Soltan who, in the presence of Kitabgi, asked the Shah to reward him in these terms: "Majesty, here is Mr. Kitabgi, a faithful servant of the Empire, who by his great knowledge and his high administrative qualities has been able to organize the customs so well and so wisely that not only have the revenues increased considerably, but that a perfect order reigns everywhere... I cannot recommend enough to Your Majesty's high magnanimity that you ennoble him by granting him the title of Khan. »

== 1889 Reuter concession for the creation of a state bank and the exploitation of mines ==
In 1872, Baron Paul Julius Reuter, a British citizen, had obtained the Reuter Concession from Nasseredin shah which granted him not only an absolute monopoly for seventy years on the construction of railway and tramway lines, but also for twenty-five years, the exclusive exploitation of all mines of non-precious metals and minerals, the monopoly of state forests, exclusivity in the construction of irrigation systems, a priority option on the creation of a national bank and on all future enterprises related to public works of any kind including roads and telegraph.

This concession, which astonished the financial world and was not supported by the British government, raised strong protests from the Russians and from the Persian people who did not accept this foreign interference. This led the Shah to cancel the concession under false pretexts (as he later did for the Alléon concession). Reuter, who had paid large sums of money to obtain the concession and start work on a railway line from Rasht to Tehran, was not compensated and kept seeking redress from the Persian government.

In December 1888, George Reuter, the baron's second son, arrived in Tehran with his father's secretary, Frenchman Édouard Cotte, who had negotiated the 1872 concession with the baron. The two men again requested a concession for a bank, mines, and railroad. Faced with difficulties encountered during the negotiations, Cotte, who had known Kitabgi in Paris in 1878 (at that time Kitabgi was trying to associate Reuter with the Alléon railroad concession), turned to Kitabgi for help. The latter convinced Reuter and Cotte to limit their request to the bank and the mines, knowing that adding the railways would inevitably raise Russian opposition. Kitabgi rewrote the deed of concession and persuaded Amin al-Soltan to grant the bank and mines concession, arguing that the bank would be a great asset for the country and that it would compensate Baron Julius Reuter for the five million francs he had spent in 1872 at a loss, thereby protecting the Persian government from future claims.

The royal firman awarding the concession to Reuter was signed on 30 January 1889. The bank took the name Imperial Bank and was granted the privilege of issuing bank bills. It remained a state bank until 1925 and rendered great services to Persia.

== Tobacco Régie of 1886 and Talbot Tobacco Régie Concession of 1890 ==
=== Tobacco Régie of 1886 ===
In July 1886, Kitabgi was part of the suite that accompanied the Shah on his trip to Mazanderan. During this trip, Amin al-Soltan informed him of his intention to establish a tobacco Régie in Persia. Kitabgi drafted a project, approved by Amin al-Soltan, and presented it on August 30 in private audience to Nasseredin shah who congratulated him and asked him to write the firman. In its broad outline, the firman stipulated that retail tobacco merchants, divided into two categories (urban and rural) and three classes (tambacou, pipe tobacco and cigarette tobacco), must henceforth have a special authorization from the administration, pay a patent and pay a tax proportional to their turnover. Controls would take place and in case of infringement - non-payment of the patent or tax - fines would be applied.

On 12 November 1886, Kitabgi received a letter from Amin al-Soltan giving him full powers to set up the administration and run it on very advantageous financial terms. From the month of December, the measures were applied and well accepted in Tehran by the tobacco merchants. However, at the end of January 1887, protests were raised in the provinces against the tobacco Régie and incidents broke out. The Shah, fearing that the discontent would spread, decided to cancel the tobacco Régie outright, depriving himself of a source of annual income that Kitabgi estimated at two million francs.

=== Talbot Tobacco Régie Concession of 1890 ===
In April 1889, Nasseredin shah undertook his third trip to Europe. Kitabgi obtained from Amin al-Soltan to be part of the royal retinue. He was seventeenth on the official list of dignitaries accompanying the shah and, as such, occupied room 17 at Buckingham Palace during the shah's visit to Queen Victoria. During this trip, which lasted five months and during which Kitabgi was received in the European courts visited by the Shah - he was decorated with the Order of Leopold in Antwerp and the Order of Francis Joseph in Vienna - he made many acquaintances, including the British Major Gerald Talbot in London. It is probably there that the two men discussed for the first time the possibility for the Major to acquire the tobacco concession in Persia. It is also likely that Sir Henry Drummond Wolff, Minister Plenipotentiary of Great Britain in Tehran, and his secretary Sidney Churchill who were in London at the time of the Shah's visit were informed of the project by Kitabgi who wanted to ensure their support once the negotiations had begun by him in Tehran. The financial prospects for Kitabgi in the event of success were very advantageous.

The Shah returned to Tehran on 24 October 1889. Motivated by the declarations of a sovereign who had often expressed in Europe the desire to modernize his country, there were many people asking for concessions. Kitabgi explained to Wolff and Churchill how to counter projects that risked competing with Talbot's and persuaded the latter to come to Tehran to present his request to the king and Amin al-Soltan. Shortly after Talbot's arrival in Tehran, Kitabgi was asked by his friend Gregorovitch, the first drogman of the Russian legation in Tehran, to help two Russian bankers, Raffalovitch and Poliakioff, to obtain a railway concession in Persia. Rumor had it that Kitabgi was abandoning Talbot's interests in favour of the Russians. Wolff warned Kitabgi and hinted that Talbot was unhappy. Kitabgi, thinking that his honesty was questioned, sent back to Talbot the letters in which the latter promised to pay him the agreed sums were the concession successful. Talbot came in person to return the letters to Kitabgi, stating that he had never doubted him and fully trusted him.

Amin al-Soltan and the Shah were reluctant to grant Talbot his concession. The former still remembered the bitter failure of the 1886 tobacco Régie. He feared that new troubles would break out if a British man got his hands on the tobacco trade in Persia. After long and difficult discussions, Kitabgi, with the support and assistance of Sir Henry and Sidney Churchill, convinced Amin al-Soltan that the Régie could only bring benefits to the Persian government. The Shah took longer to convince. Kitabgi engaged Talbot to put pressure on the king by threatening to return to London if the deal was not concluded. Finally, Nasseredin resorted to istikhara (divinatory consultation) to make his decision. The consultation being favorable, the shah granted the concession to Talbot. This was signed on 21 March 1890.

Shortly afterwards, Talbot left Tehran, thanking Kitabgi in these terms: "I thank you a thousand times, my good friend, for all your kindness and good will for your devoted Gerald F. Talbot".

The outcome of this venture, justifying Amin al-Soltan's fears, is known. The concession, granting Talbot a monopoly for fifty years on the production, sale and export of Persian tobacco, aroused the anger of tobacco growers and merchants. The arrival in Persia of dozens of British employees of the tobacco company provoked the discontent of the people. The protesters appealed to the clergy who supported their cause and organized from the spring of 1891, throughout the country, a veritable revolt against the government and the Régie, going so far as to issue a fatwa against the use of tobacco, a fatwa that was followed by almost all social classes in the country. On 4 January 1892, bloody riots killed seven demonstrators in Tehran. The Shah abolished the Régie on 26 January. Most historians agree that this revolt (tobacco protest), organized and associating the people, the clergy, merchants and part of the ruling class, was the prelude to the troubles that would agitate Persia a dozen years later and lead to the Persian Constitutional Revolution of 1905.

== Resignation and departure for Europe ==
While the revolt was being organized in the spring of 1891, Kitabgi was in Europe. He left Tehran on May 21, 1890 for a seventeen-month journey motivated by three main reasons :

Firstly, he settled his family in Lausanne, Switzerland.

Second, Kitabgi spent a lot of time in London to settle with Talbot all the details, logistical and financial, of the setting up of the Tobacco Régie.

Finally, he was mandated by Amin al-Soltan to settle a dispute between Persia and Italy. A certain Consonno, an Italian merchant who traded with Persia and had gotten into the habit of defrauding Persian customs, had his goods confiscated in 1883. Consonno took the case to the Italian authorities, who threatened a diplomatic crisis with Persia if Consonno was not reimbursed two and a half million francs. Persia, on Kitabgi's advice, decided to resort to international arbitration and Sir William Arthur White, British Ambassador to Constantinople, was asked to settle the dispute. Kitabgi, documents in hand, spent three months in Constantinople to defend the Persian cause. Arbitration was finally rendered on 21 June 1891 in favor of Persia.

Kitabgi returned to Tehran on 10 October 1891. The Régie was threatened with bankruptcy. Sir Henry, recalled to London and appointed ambassador to Madrid, had just left Tehran. The British chargé d'affaires in Tehran, Robert John Kennedy, asked Kitabgi, through Amin al-Soltan, to take over the management of the agency. Judging the situation of the latter to be hopeless, Kitabgi refused.

Shortly after the bloody riots of 4 January 1892, Kitabgi was the victim of the flu epidemic that swept over Tehran and which also affected the Shah and many dignitaries. Treated by Dr. Tom Francis Odling of the British legation, Kitabgi recovered just after the Shah abolished the Régie.

Disappointed by this failure, having amassed a sufficient fortune to live easily in Europe and wishing to join his family in Switzerland, Kitabgi asked Amin al-Soltan to resign. The latter accepted and, by the time he finished his fiscal year (which ended in Norouz the following year, on March 21, 1893), Kitabgi left to join his family in Lausanne in the spring of 1893.

== Paris and the 1900 World Fair ==
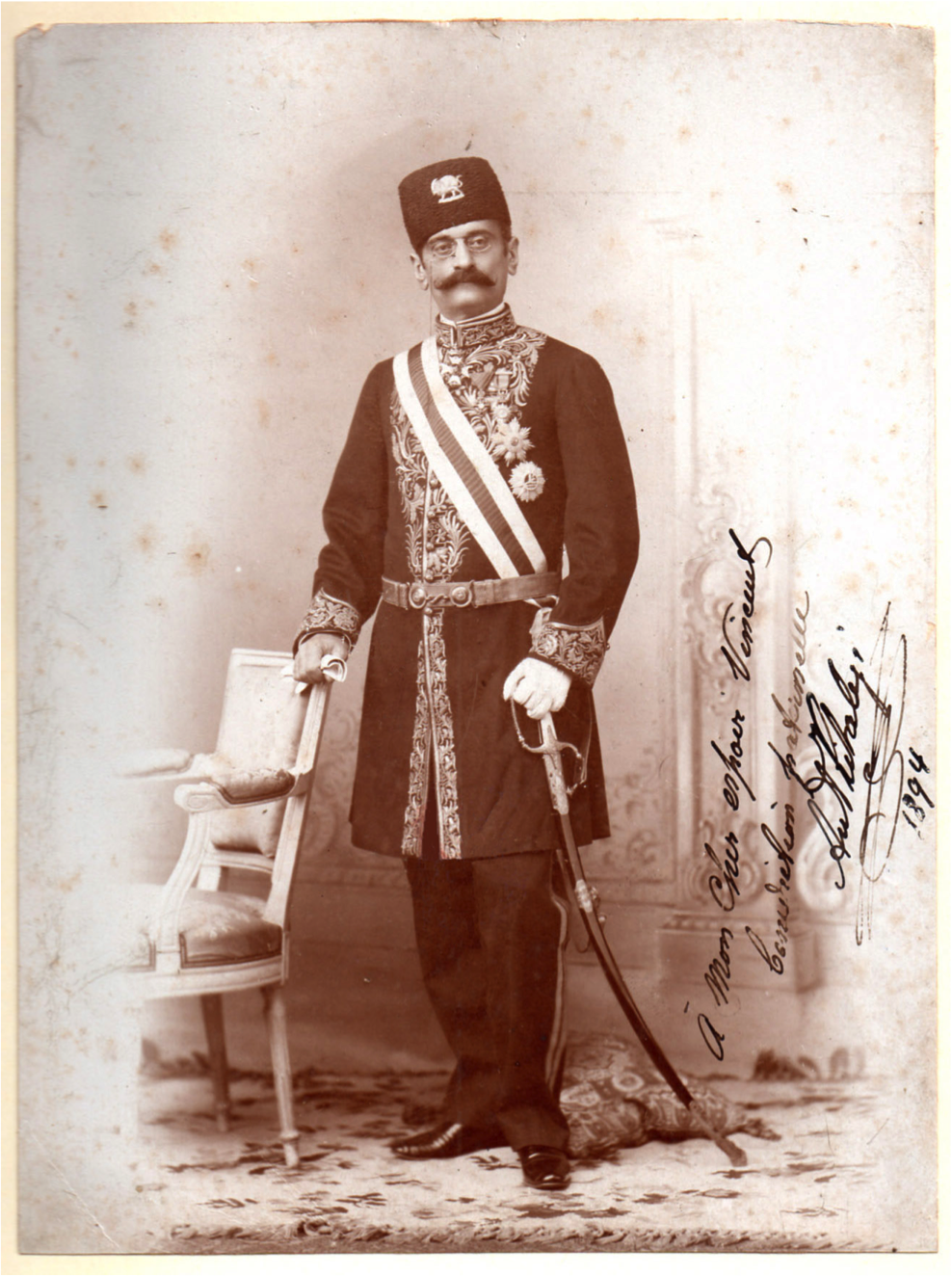
Antoine Kitabgi Khan in 1894. Photo dedicated to his son Vincent.

After several months in Lausanne, Kitabgi moved to Paris with his family at the end of 1893. In the meantime, he asked Amin al-Soltan for an appointment as a diplomat in Europe. He obtained the post of Counsellor of the Brussels Legation, whose minister was Mirza Djevad Khan, Saad ed-Dowleh. Kitabgi held this position until 1898.

In 1899, Kitabgi was appointed General Commissioner for Persia at the 1900 World Fair (Exposition Universelle (1900)) by Mozaffaredin shah (who succeeded his father Nasseredin, assassinated in 1896). The photograph at the head of this article is the one that appeared in the official guide of the Exhibition. Kitabgi wanted to erase the bad image left by the Persian pavilion erected on the occasion of the 1889 World Fair. He called upon the French architect Philippe Mériat to build a pavilion inspired by the madreseh madar-e chah (Koranic school of the shah's mother) in Esfahan. Numerous Persian objects and products were exhibited and oriental shows were given at the pavilion, which was a great success with the public and was praised by the press.

Kitabgi received, with great pomp, Mozaffaredin shah at the Persian pavilion on July 30, 1900. He read a speech in Persian to his sovereign. Three days later, as the Shah was on his way to Sèvres, his carriage was attacked by a terrorist who pointed a revolver at him. The madman was subdued before he could fire. The Shah was late in his visits and Kitabgi was charged with announcing to the organizers of the stands concerned that they would not be visited by the king of kings.

Before leaving Paris, the Shah himself conferred on Kitabgi the great cordon of the Lion and the Sun.

== D'Arcy oil concession ==
In 1898, Kitabgi came into possession of a report on potential oil deposits in Persia. This report was the work of the French civil engineer, geologist and archaeologist Jacques de Morgan who, during a scientific mission in 1891 in southwestern Persia, noted the presence of naphtha and studied the nature of the oilfields at Kend é-Shirin and Kasr é-Shirin. He had published his observations in the Annals of Mines. One of his colleagues of the mission, George Lampre, married to a niece of Édouard Cotte, knowing that the latter had negotiated several concessions in Persia, gave him the report. Cotte, knowing of Kitabgi's interest in oil, entrusted him with the report after completing it.

In 1899 and 1900, with the report in hand, Kitabgi tried unsuccessfully to interest several high-level capitalists in obtaining an oil concession in Persia. The Royal Dutch Petroleum Company was approached. The director of the company, Henri Deterding, advised by Calouste Gulbenkian (the future Mr. 5% of oil), rejected the operation, considering it too risky.

At the same time, Kitabgi having asked his friend Sir Henry Drummond Wolff to look for investors in Great Britain, the latter, through his nephew Lord Orford, made the acquaintance of William Knox D'Arcy, a Briton who had made a fortune in gold mines in Australia. D'Arcy was interested in Iranian oil and Wolff introduced him to Kitabgi in February 1901. The two men signed an agreement. D'Arcy would provide the capital necessary for the operation while Kitabgi would take over the negotiations with Persia. Kitabgi would have 7% of the shares of the concession plus 10% at the issue, Cotte 3% of the shares and Wolff 10% of the profits.

Kitabgi left for Persia on March 14, 1901 with enough money to distribute the necessary bribes. After difficult negotiations, the concession was granted to D'Arcy by Mozaffaredin shah on 28 May 1901 and Kitabgi was appointed Imperial Commissioner by the Persian government to look after the interests of Persia. Kitabgi used his knowledge of the Persian court, government and religious authorities to ensure that the oil concession did not suffer the same fate as the tobacco concession ten years earlier. Before his return to Europe, he got D'Arcy to hire his three eldest sons: Paul in Tehran as a liaison with the Persian government, Vincent in London as a liaison with D'Arcy, and Édouard in Persia, in Kasr é-Shirin, as assistant to the engineer George Bernard Reynolds, who was in charge of oil prospecting for D'Arcy.

== Return to Europe and death ==
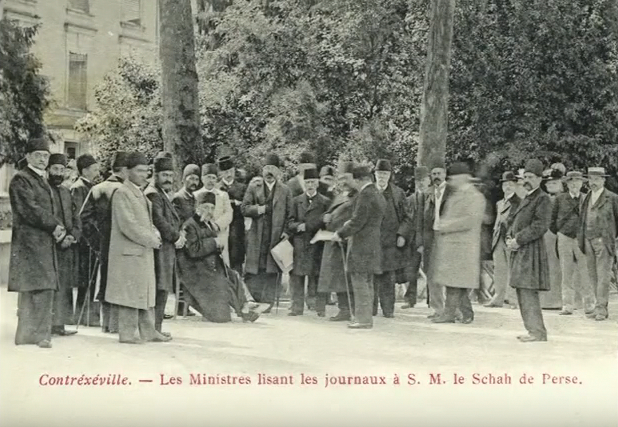
Mozaffaredin shah (seated) and his ministers in Contrexéville in 1902. Antoine Kitabgi Khan is the first figure on the left in the photo.

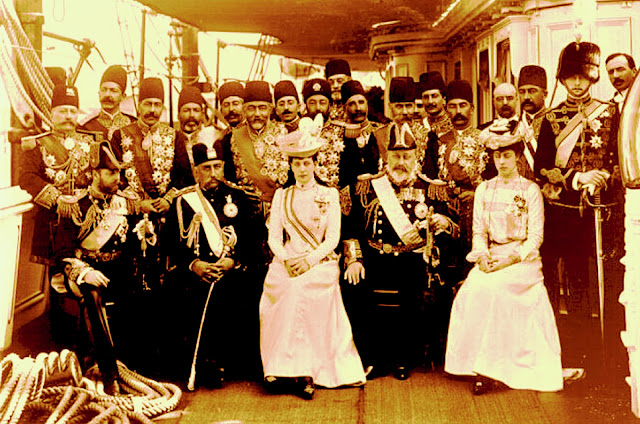
Mozaffaredin Shah and his suite on board the yacht HMY Victoria and Albert in Portsmouth in 1902. Seated, from left to right: the Prince of Wales, the Shah, Queen Alexandra, King Edward VII, and the Princess Victoria. Standing between the Shah and the Queen: Amin al-Soltan. In the back and in the middle, his head above the others: Antoine Kitabgi Khan.

Back in Europe, Kitabgi continued to organize the oil concession operations. In August 1902, he joined the retinue of Mozaffaredin shah who made his second trip to Europe. A photograph shows him in the middle of the shah's retinue posing on the yacht HMY Victoria and Albert (1899) alongside King Edward VII, Queen Alexandra, the Prince of Wales and Princess Victoria.

Towards the end of the year, Kitabgi's health deteriorated and during a stay in Italy, suffering from respiratory insufficiency, he died in Livorno on 20 December 1902, just before his sixtieth birthday and without having seen the oil spurt in Iran. His funeral was celebrated in Livorno and he was later buried in the Montparnasse cemetery in Paris. D'Arcy wrote to Vincent Kitabgi: "I have lost a kind and sincere friend and a valuable and able colleague."

== Future of the concession ==
The oil so long awaited by the concessionaires did not come out until May 26, 1908 from a well near Shuster.

In the meantime the interests of the Kitabgi family were taken care of by Vincent who was appointed Imperial Commissioner in place of his father. As for D'Arcy, he could no longer bear the costs of prospecting alone. In agreement with the share holders, he incorporated the shares of the concession operating company into Burmah Oil. When oil finally came out with prospects of abundant production, the company became the Anglo-Persian Oil Company, then the Anglo-Iranian Oil Company, and finally BP.

== Kitabgi's relationships with the Amin-al-Soltans ==
When Kitabgi took up his position as Director General of Customs, his chief was Agha Mohammed Ibrahim, Amin al-Soltan, with whom he maintained good relations, considering him a bit like a father. When Ibrahim died in 1883, his second son, Mirza Ali Asghar Khan, Emin ul-Mulk, took over his title and duties. This young man of 25 years knew a dazzling career: he was named grand-vizier in 1891 by Nasseredin shah and received from Mozaffaredin shah in 1900 the title, rarely awarded, of Atabek e-Azam. He was then the most powerful man in Persia after the Shah.

When the young Amin al-Soltan took office, relations between Kitabgi and his new leader were strained. Kitabgi found it difficult to bear being under the orders of a young man fifteen years his junior. But as they worked together, the two men learned to appreciate each other, Kitabgi recognizing Amin al-Soltan's intelligence and the latter appreciating Kitabgi's skills. Sir Henry Drummond Wolff wrote in his memoirs: "The Amin-es-Sultan relied very much on a coadjutor of his - Kitabgi Khan - who was also of Georgian origin. He was a Roman Catholic, and married to an Armenian lady. The European element of the Persian Government was really represented by Kitabgi Khan, for he was well versed in Western matters - being able to draw up a concession and initiate commercial movements. He was the head of the Custom House".

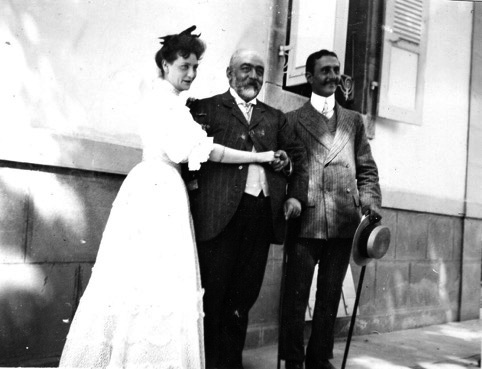
Amin al-Soltan at the engagement of Edouard Kitabgi and Marie-Thérèse Bauche, Paris, 1905.

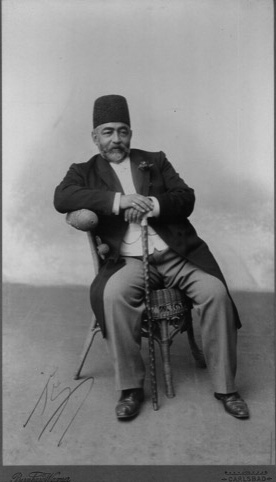
Amin al-Soltan in Carlsbad during his world tour. Photo signed and given to the Kitabgi Family.

The two men remained friends until Kitabgi's death, and this friendship was maintained by Kitabgi's sons until the assassination of Amin al-Soltan in 1907. Thus, during the trip around the world that the latter undertook when he resigned from his post in September 1903, he was received by the Kitabgis on several occasions in France and Switzerland, as can be seen in numerous photographs kept by the Kitabgi family.

== Kitabgi's diaries and correspondence ==
The books focusing on Kitabgi Khan written before 2000 mainly concern the D'Arcy concession and the key role played by Kitabgi in this venture and are based mainly on the archives of the Foreign Office and British Petroleum.

A considerable source of information can be found in Kitabgi's diaries and correspondence written between 1878 and his death, documents that have been preserved. They provide a detailed account of his tenure as director of Persian customs, reforms to the customs system and attempts to reform the currency and tobacco trade, and the genesis of bank, tobacco and petroleum concessions.

In 2010, these sources were made available to the scientific community. Some of them were the subject of an in-depth analysis that was used to publish several documents. These include an article published in a peer-reviewed journal focusing on the role played by Kitabgi in the genesis of the 1886 Persian tobacco Régie and the 1890 Talbot tobacco concession, a thesis for a PhD from the University of Oxford detailing how Kitabgi obtained his 1901 oil concession for D'Arcy, a book based on the above mentioned PhD thesis and an article in Encyclopedia Iranica that includes this information. They shed a whole new light on these events and correct many erroneous details about Kitabgi in the literature.
