= Place de l'Opéra =

Square in Paris, France

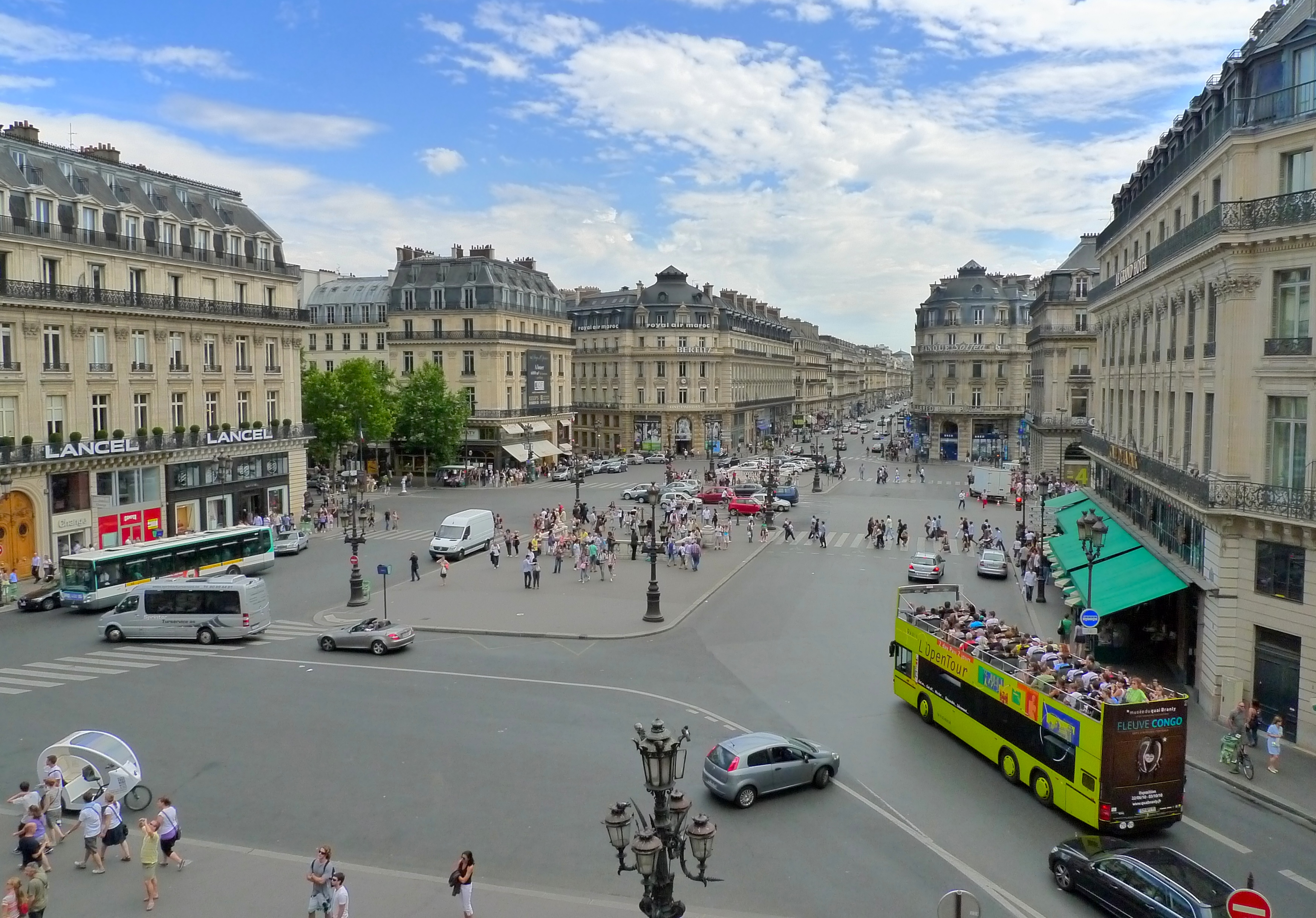
- The Place de l'Opéra seen from the Palais Garnier in 2010

- Location within Paris
- Arrondissement: 9th
- Quarter: Opéra
- Coordinates: 48°52′14″N 02°19′56″E

The Place de l'Opéra (French pronunciation: [plas də lɔpeʁa]) is a square in the 9th arrondissement of Paris. It is located at the junction of the Boulevard des Italiens, the Boulevard des Capucines, the Avenue de l'Opéra, the Rue Auber, the Rue Halévy, the Rue de la Paix and the Rue du Quatre-Septembre.

The Place de l'Opéra was built at the same time as the Palais Garnier, the opera house designed by Charles Garnier after which it is named and of which it provides a panoramic view. Both structures were part of Haussmann's renovation of Paris under Napoleon III.

== 2, place de l’Opéra ==
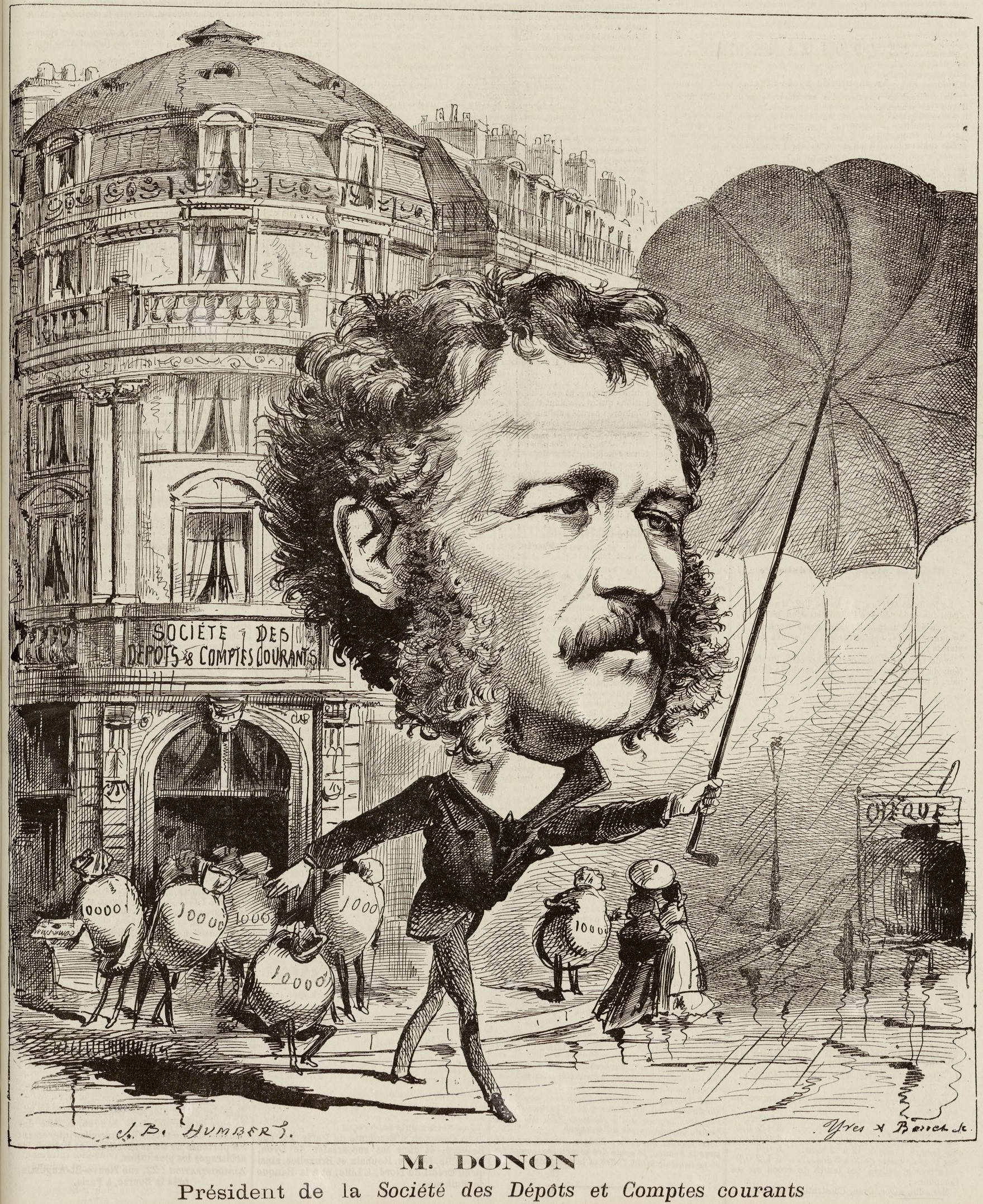
The building at 2, place de l'Opéra in a 1873 caricature of SDCC chairman Armand Donon

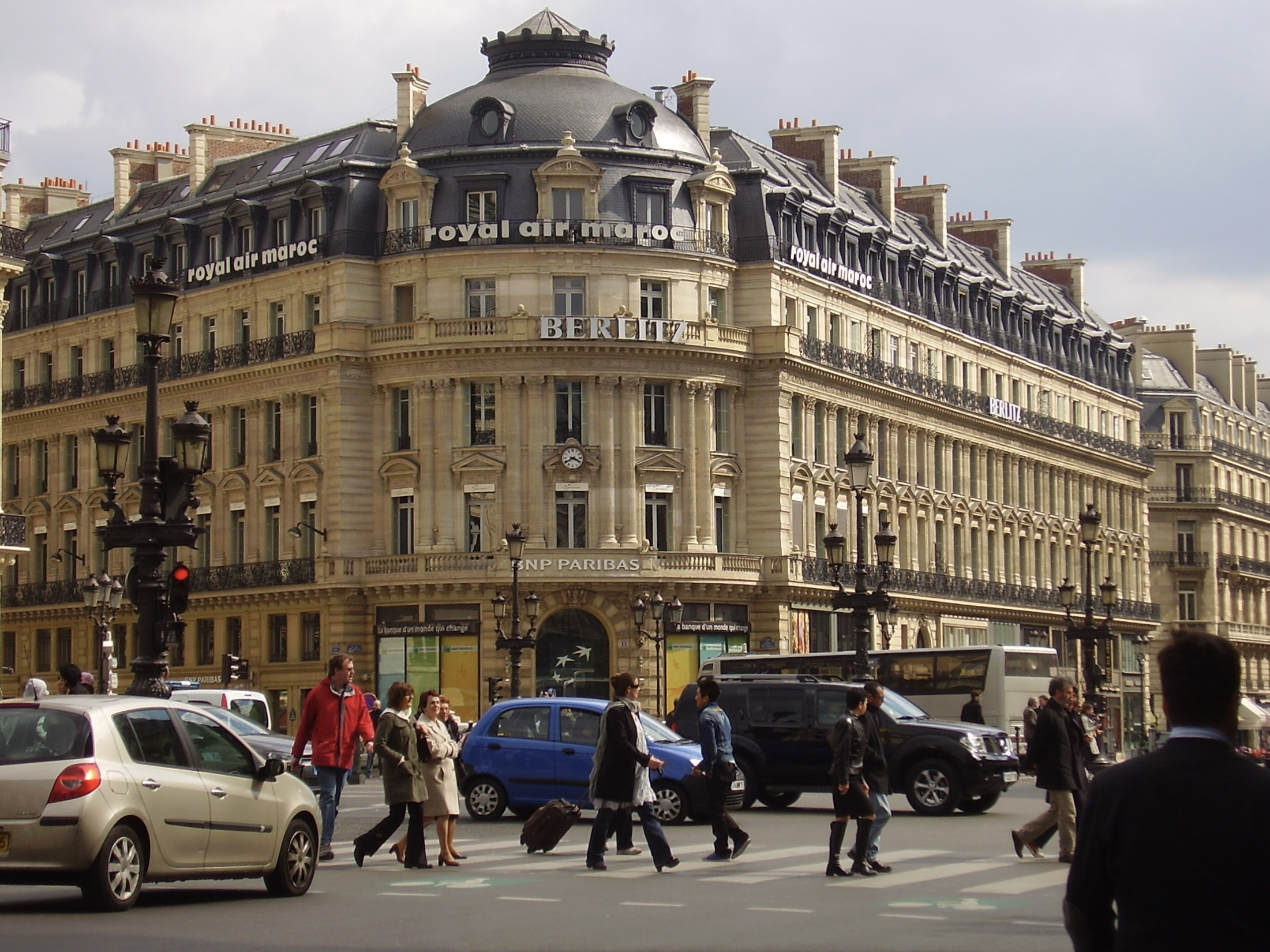
2, place de l'Opéra

The building at No. 2, on the corner of the Rue du Quatre-Septembre, was built between 1868 and 1873 on a design by architect Henri Blondel. It was initially the head office of the Société des Dépôts et Comptes Courants (SDCC), and following the latter's liquidation in 1892 became the principal Parisian branch of Comptoir national d'escompte de Paris (CNEP), itself recently recovered from a major restructuring.

Between 1940 and 1944, the building was the location of the Kommandantur or office of the military commander of the city of Paris. It is now used by the CNEP's successor bank BNP Paribas.

== Transportation ==
Located near the Metro station: Opéra.

Panorama of Place de L'Opera (1900)
