= Blondin (surname) =

Blondin is a surname of French origin, literally meaning a person with blond hair. It may refer to:

- Antoine Blondin, French writer
- Charles Blondin, French tightrope walker
- Denis Blondin, Canadian anthropologist and writer
- Ester Blondin, founder of College Marie Anne
- Ethel Blondin-Andrew, Canadian politician
- Fred Blondin, French singer and songwriter
- Yvan Blondin, Canadian Forces General Officer
- Maryvonne Blondin, French politician
- Pierre Édouard Blondin, Canadian politician

== Fictional characters ==
- Blondin, the white character from the Belgian comic strip Blondin et Cirage by Jijé

== See also ==
- Blondine (disambiguation)
