= 1843 in Iran =

- Decades
- See also: Other events of 1843; Years in Iran

The following lists events that happened during 1843 in the Qajar era.

== Incumbents ==
- Monarch: Mohammad Shah Qajar

== Births ==
- November 27 – Fazlullah Nouri, Iranian Shi'a theologian.
- December 10 – Mirza Abutaleb Zanjani, Iranian cleric.
- ? – Abdol-samad Mirza Ezz ed-Dowleh, Qajar prince.
- ? – Kitabgi, Persian general.
- ? – Martiros Khan Davidkhanian, Iranian general and philanthropist.
- ? – Mirza Abdollah, Iranian musician.
