= Marie Anne Blondin =

Canadian teacher and Mother Superior

Blessed Marie Anne Blondin SSA
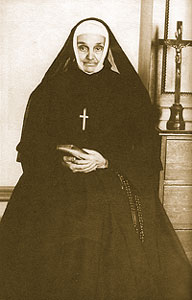
- The Blessed Marie-Anne in 1888

Religious and Foundress
- Born: Esther Blondin; 18 April 1809; Terrebonne, Lower Canada, British Empire
- Died: 2 January 1890 (aged 80); Lachine, Quebec, Canada
- Venerated in: Catholic Church (Canada and the Sisters of Saint Anne)
- Beatified: April 29, 2001, Saint Peter's Square, Vatican City by Pope John Paul II
- Feast: 2 January
- Attributes: Religious habit
- Patronage: Sisters of Saint Anne

Marie Anne Blondin, SSA (18 April 1809 – 2 January 1890) was a Canadian Catholic teacher who founded the Sisters of Saint Anne in 1850 and dedicated herself to educating the rural population of the Province of Canada. She was beatified in 2001 by Pope John Paul II.

== Life ==
=== Early life ===
She was born Esther Blondin on 18 April 1809 in Terrebonne, Lower Canada, to Jean-Baptiste Blondin and Marie-Rose Limoges, simple farmers who lived on a country road called Côte Terrebonne on the edge of the Mille Îsles River. At the age of 20, she became a domestic servant to a local merchant to help support her parents. Shortly after that, she was hired to work for the Sisters of the Congregation of Notre Dame of Montreal, who staffed the parochial school of the town. Having grown up illiterate, she learned how to read and write from the Sisters of the convent. In 1833 Blondin was accepted into the novitiate of the Congregation, but had to leave soon after her admission for health reasons.

Later that same year, Blondin accepted the invitation from another former novice of the Congregation, who was running a parochial school in Vaudreuil, to join her in teaching there. Within a few years, she had become the principal of the school, then known as the Académie Blondin.

=== Foundress ===
==== Foundation ====
Over the years, Blondin found out that one of the causes of the widespread illiteracy in the French-speaking community was a certain church ruling that forbade that children be taught by members of the opposite sex. Unable to finance two schools, many parish priests chose to have none. In 1848 Esther presented to the Bishop of Montreal, Ignace Bourget, a plan to found a religious congregation "for the education of poor country children, both girls and boys in the same schools". Despite the novelty of the suggestion, and possible violation of church rules, since the Canadian government was in favor of such schools, he authorized the experiment. She obtained the commitment of several young women for this endeavor and a novitiate was opened to form members for the proposed new congregation on 13 September 1848. Due to the death of Emilie Forté on 1 August 1849, only a few days after her admission, the first postulants of the congregation numbered nine, when they received the religious habit of the new Congregation of the Daughters of Saint Anne, as it was originally named, on 15 August 1849. This group included Blondin, who received the religious name of Sister Marie Anne.

Of this group, Blondin and four other Sisters made their profession of religious vows on 8 September 1850. One barrier to this, however, was a community debt of about £1,500. This debt was paid by the local pastor, the Abbé Paul-Loub Archambault, clearing the way to their establishment under canon law. Blondin was named the Superior of the community, becoming referred to as Mother Marie Anne. The congregation quickly grew to such an extant that a new community was established the following year in Sainte-Geneviève. On 22 August 1853, to accommodate their growing numbers, the Sisters were moved by the bishop from Vaudreuil to Saint-Jacques de l'Achigan.

==== Persecution ====
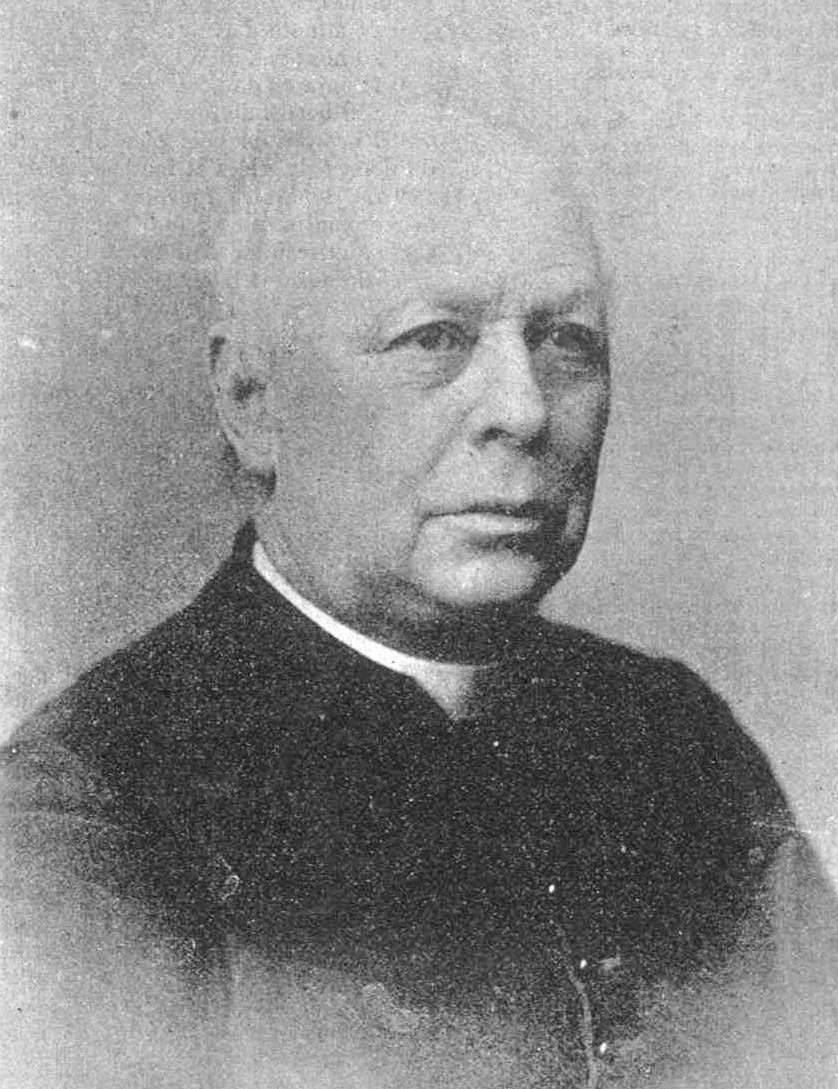
Abbé Louis-Adolphe Maréchal

At that time, Bourget appointed the Abbé Louis-Adolphe Maréchal as chaplain to the community. This priest began to exercise a dictatorial control of the community, determining on his own the school fees, and pressuring the Sisters not to exercise their right to go to a confessor of their choice, but solely to him.

As a result of this conflict, the bishop instructed Blondin to resign as Superior of the community as of 18 August 1854, calling for new elections. He further instructed her to refuse any position of authority in the congregation, even if she were to be elected to one by the Sisters. That following November she was moved to Sainte-Geneviève, where she was named the director of the school.

Under the influence of Maréchal, criticism of Blondin continued in her new post from the new leaders of the congregation. Finally, under accusation of mismanagement, in October 1858 she was recalled to the motherhouse, and was transferred to Lachine when it became the motherhouse in 1864. She was to spend the rest of her life there, assigned to domestic chores, and kept from any position of authority in the congregation. Nevertheless, to show their respect for her judgement, she was elected as General Assistant in the General Chapters of the congregation in 1872 and again in 1878. She was barred, however, from attending their meetings by the General Council. She accepted this treatment as the will of God and lived in total obscurity for the rest of her life, initially not even being listed in the directory of Sisters.

Blondin developed severe bronchitis in the autumn of 1889 and died on 2 January 1890. Before her death, she once again asked for pardon from Maréchal. Her funeral was held on 7 January, the first in the newly built Shrine of St. Anne attached to the motherhouse of the congregation.

== Veneration ==
Blondin remained ignored by the congregation she had founded for almost another generation, due to long-held prejudices about her character. It was only in 1917, after a chaplain at the motherhouse had come to know the details of her life and gave a series of talks about her to the community, that enthusiasm arose among the Sisters for honoring her.

After the then-mandatory waiting period of 50 years to open a cause for canonization, the Sisters began to collect the information necessary for having Mother Marie Anne canonized. Her skeletal remains were exhumed at the community cemetery at the motherhouse, and certified and sealed on May 16, 1945. On August 19, 1950, Paul-Émile Léger, the Archbishop of Montreal, gave permission to introduce the cause of Mother Marie Anne in Rome. The official opening of the diocesan information process took place at the cardinal’s residence in Montreal on March 16, 1955. Her first complete biography was published in 1956, written by Eugène Nadeau, entitled Martyre du silence.

The Holy See accepted the petition, and the Sacred Congregation of Rites approved the writings of Mother Marie Anne on December 15, 1964. Pope John Paul II granted her the title of Venerable in 1991. After the certification of a miracle having taken place through her intercession, she was beatified by that same pope on April 29, 2001.
