= Blondine (disambiguation) =

Blondine is a 1945 French fantasy film and the protagonist thereof.

Blondine (literally meaning "blond woman") may also refer to:

- Blondine, a novel by Countess of Ségur
- Blondine, shipwrecked UK brig

== Fictional characters ==
- in Princess Belle-Etoile
- in The Imp Prince
- in Three Lederhosen in St. Tropez
- Blonde or Blondine in Die Entführung aus dem Serail
- in Mademoiselle Fifi (opera)
- in Un jour mon prince
- Sister Blondine in Béatrice (opera)

== See also ==
- Blondin (disambiguation)
