= Sisters of Saint Anne =

1850 establishments in Canada

- Abbreviation: S.S.A
- Formation: 1850; 176 years ago
- Founder: Marie Anne Blondin
- Founded at: Vaudreuil, Quebec, Canada
- Type: Catholic religious order
- Parent organization: Catholic Church

The Sisters of Saint Anne (SSA) is a Catholic religious institute founded in 1850 in Vaudreuil, Quebec, Canada, by Marie Anne Blondin to promote the education of the rural children of the Province of Canada. Their vision is rooted in and guided by Ignatian spirituality.

== Foundation ==
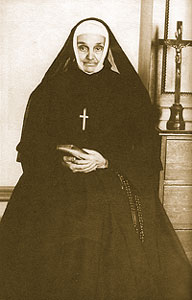
Mother Marie Anne Blondin in 1888

Esther Blondin (1809-1890) was the daughter of simple farmers in the village of Terrebonne, Quebec. Through her work as a domestic servant to the teaching Sisters of the Congregation of Notre Dame of Montreal who had opened a parochial school in the town, she came to learn how to read and write. She was accepted to the novitiate of the Sisters in 1833, but soon had to leave for reasons of health. Later that same year, having recovered her health, Blondin accepted the invitation from another former novice of the Congregation, who was running a parochial school in Vaudreuil, to join her in teaching there. Within a few years, she had become the principal of the school, then known as the Académie Blondin, where she trained teachers for the rural schools of the province.

Over the years, Blondin found out that one of the causes of the widespread illiteracy in the French-speaking community was a certain Church ruling that forbade that children be taught by members of the opposite sex. Unable to finance two schools, many parish priests chose to have none. In 1848 Esther presented to the Bishop of Montreal, Ignace Bourget, a plan to found a religious congregation "for the education of poor country children, both girls and boys in the same schools." Despite the novelty of the suggestion and possible violation of Church rules, since the Canadian government was in favour of such schools he authorized the experiment. She obtained the commitment of several young women for this endeavor and a novitiate was opened to form members for the proposed new congregation on 13 September 1848.

The first postulants (admission-seeking candidates) of the congregation received the habit of the new Congregation of the Daughters of Saint Anne, as it was originally named, on 15 August 1849. This group included Blondin, who received the religious name of Sister Marie Anne.

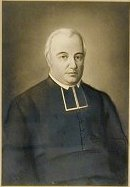
Abbé Paul-Loup Archambault

Of this group, Blondin and four other Sisters made their profession of religious vows on 8 September 1850, thereby allowing the congregation to become legally formed. One barrier to this, however, was a community debt of about £1,500. This debt was paid by the local pastor, the Abbé Paul-Loup Archambault (1787 – 1859), clearing the way to their establishment under canon law. Blondin was named the superior of the congregation, becoming referred to as Mother Marie Anne. In March 1851 Bourget wrote a Rule of Life and Constitutions for the congregation. By October of that same year, the congregation had grown to such an extant that a new community was established in Sainte-Geneviève.

On 22 August 1853, to accommodate their growing numbers, the Sisters were moved by Bourget from Vaudreuil to Saint-Jacques de l'Achigan. At that time, he appointed the Abbé Louis-Adolphe Maréchal as chaplain to the community. This priest began to exercise a dictatorial control of the community, determining on his own the school fees, and pressuring the Sisters not to exercise their right to go to a confessor of their choice, but solely to him. As a result of this conflict, the bishop instructed Mother Marie Anne to resign as Superior of the community as of 18 August 1854, calling for new elections. He further commanded that she neither offer her name for re-election, nor accept election. Though elected to the General Council twice, she was kept from any further participation in the administration of the congregation.

At the election which was then held, Mother Marie Jeanne de Chantal was elected the superior of the congregation. In 1857 Bourget made some final revisions to the Constitutions, which he then provisionally approved. That year a new habit was adopted by the congregation, and all the Sisters underwent a new investiture. The congregation held its first General Chapter in 1860. The following year, Mother Jeanne de Chantal purchased Simpson Manor in Lachine, which became the General Motherhouse in 1864. The decretum laudis of the Holy See was received in March 1863. Final approval of the Constitutions was granted by Bourget on 13 February 1875. In 1884 final approval of the congregation was granted by Pope Leo XIII. The name of the congregation was changed to its current one on 12 July 12, 1888.

The practice of admitting women to serve the congregation as lay sisters began in 1891. They helped to operate its various institutions until 1926, when the practice was ended.

== Expansion ==
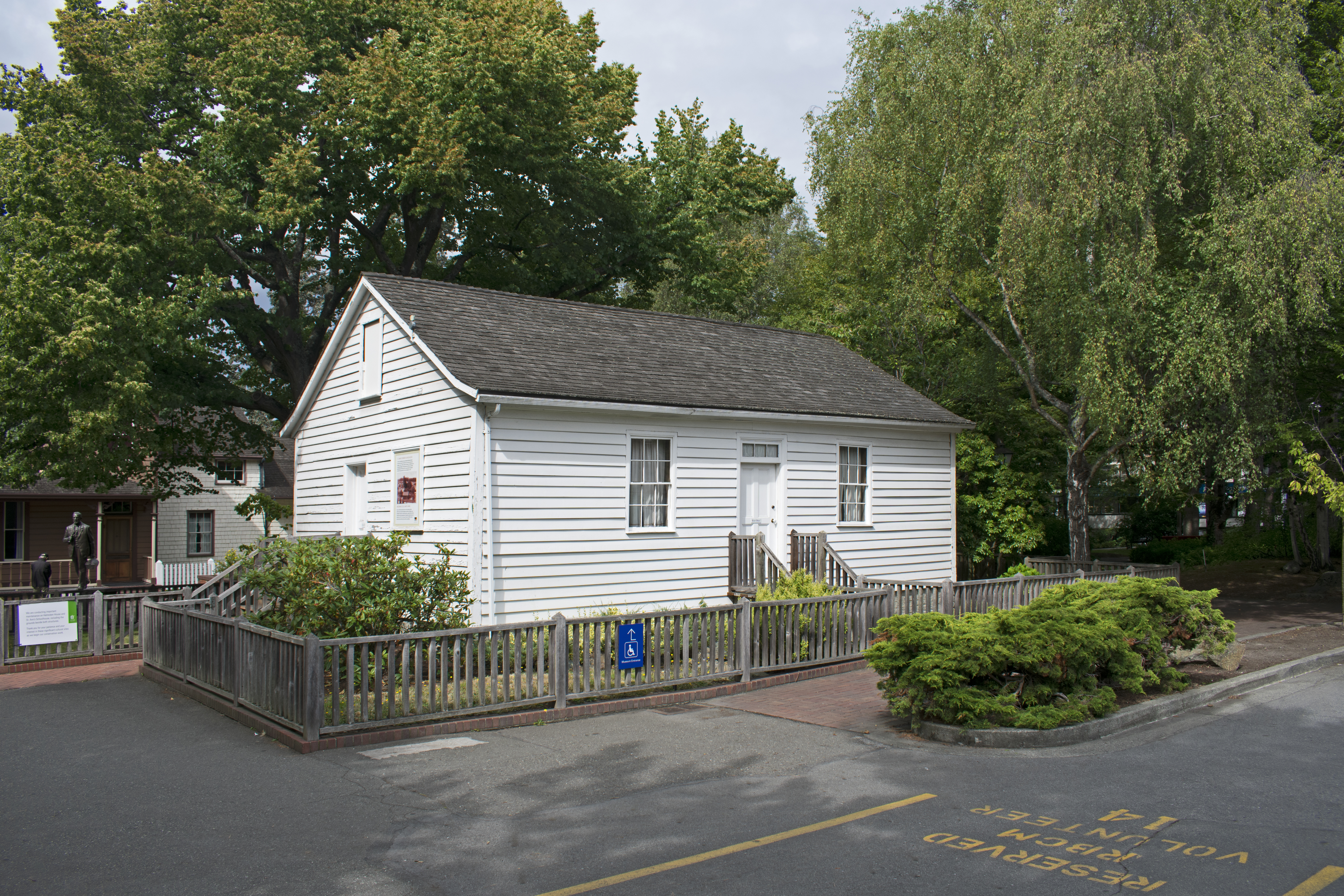
St. Ann's schoolhouse, built in 1844 as a log cabin and used by the Sisters of Saint Anne since 1858, is conserved as part of Royal British Columbia Museum

In 1858, the congregation accepted a request to help Modeste Demers, the Bishop of Vancouver Island, with the education of the children of the First Nations and of the growing European immigrants in that remote mission region. Four Sisters from Saint-Jacques who had volunteered for this endeavor set sail for the western coast on April 8, traveling by way of the Isthmus of Panama due to there being no rail connection across Canada at that time. They arrived in Victoria, British Columbia, the following June 5. In 1871 St. Ann's Academy was established, followed by St. Joseph Hospital in 1876.

The Sisters arrived in the United States in September 1867 at the request of the Bishop of Buffalo, opening a school in Oswego, New York. They went on to expand throughout northern New York and New England, staffing many schools of French-speaking parishes. The Sisters later established a provincial motherhouse in Marlboro, Massachusetts.

By 1896 the congregation had so grown, that, on April 27, its administration was divided among four Provinces. In 1912, the Sisters of the United States Province numbered 150.

During the 20th century, the Sisters established missions to serve the Third World. Foundations were made in Japan (1934), Haiti (1944), Chile (1965), and Cameroon (1969). The congregation has taught in various schools and has built schools at all levels of education and foundations, including hospitals, across western Canada, the United States, Alaska, Quebec, and Haiti, where they still operate the Collège Marie-Anne, having rebuilt after the devastating earthquake of 2010.

== Role in Residential School System ==
With their focus on educating First Nations children, the Sisters of St. Ann were integral to the colonial project in Canada and specifically to the Canadian Indian residential school system, which sought to eradicate Indigenous culture in Canada. The Sisters founded and taught at many residential schools, especially in British Columbia, including St. Mary's Indian Residential School, Kamloops Indian Residential School, Kuper Island Indian Residential School, and Lower Post Indian Residential School. The Sisters also founded and operated their own residential school from 1864 to 1876 in Duncan, BC. In 2014, the Canadian Catholic Congregations of Women Religious, including the Sisters of St. Ann, released a statement on their involvement in the Canadian Indian residential school system.

== List of Schools and Hospitals Owned and Operated by the Sisters of Saint Ann ==
- St. Ann’s Convent School, Victoria, B.C. (Opened 1858)
- Broad Street School, Victoria, B.C. (1859)
- View Street School, Victoria, B.C. (1861)
- St. Ann’s School, Duncan, B.C. (1864)
- St. Ann’s Academy, New Westminster, B.C. (1865)
- St. Ann’s Academy, Victoria, B.C. (1872)
- St. Joseph’s School, Williams Lake, B.C. (1876)
- St. Ann’s School and Convent, Nanaimo, B.C. (1877)
- St. Ann’s Academy, Kamloops, B.C. (1880)
- St. Ann’s School and Convent, Juneau, Alaska (1886)
- St. Ann’s Kindergarten, Victoria, B.C. (1888)
- Holy Cross Mission School, Holy Cross, Alaska (1888)
- St. Ann’s Academy/Holy Rosary, Vancouver, B.C. (1888)
- Akulurak Indian Mission School, Akulurak, Alaska (1894)
- St. Ann’s School and Convent, Douglas Island, Alaska (1895)
- St. Mary’s School, Dawson City, Yukon(1899)
- Our Lady of the Snows School, Nulato, Alaska (1899)
- St. Aloysius Protectorate for Boys, Victoria, B.C. (1899)
- St. Joseph’s School of Nursing, Victoria, B.C. (1900)
- St. Mary’s School, Ladysmith, B.C. (1909)
- Little Flower Academy, Vancouver, B.C. (1927)
- St. Ann’s Kindergarten and Primary School, Victoria, B.C. (1929)
- Anna Maria College, Paxton, Massachusetts (1946)
- Holy Ghost School, Richmond, B.C. (1947)
- Holy Angels Kindergarten, Victoria, B.C. (1948)
- St. Ann’s School and Convent, Penticton, B.C. (1952)
- Copper Valley School, Glenallen, Alaska (1956)
- St. James School, Vernon, B.C. (1956)
- St. Patrick’s School and Convent, Victoria, B.C. (1957)
- Centennial Annex (Secondary/High School), Victoria, B.C. (1958)
- St. Mary’s/St. Joseph’s, Andreafsky, Alaska (1974)
- Virgen Del Pilar School, Rizal, Philippines

The Sisters taught in an additional 18 schools across British Columbia.

The Sisters of St. Ann opened the following hospitals on the west coast:

- St. Joseph’s Hospital, Victoria, B.C. (1876-1972)
- St. Ann’s Hospital, Juneau, Alaska (1886-1968)
- St. Ann’s Hospital, Douglas, Alaska (1898-1920)
- St. Mary’s Hospital, Dawson, Yukon (1898-1906)
- Our Lady of Lourdes Hospital, Campbell River, B.C. (1926-1957)
- Sacred Heart Hospital, Smithers, B.C. (1934-1969)
- Mount St. Mary Hospital, Victoria, B.C. (1941-2000)
- St. Martin’s Hospital, Oliver, B.C. (1942-1973)
- Skagway Sanatorium, Skagway, Alaska (1945-1947)
- Mount St. Francis Hospital, Nelson, B.C. (1947-1997)

== Current status ==
At their height, the Sisters numbered some 3,900 members. Today they number about 840 members. They are joined in their work by about 300 men and women who are associates of the congregation.

== Notable members ==
- Lydia Boucher (Sister Marie-Therese), composer
- Sister Marie Jean-Eudes Tellier, a leading botanist
- Alice Vinette (Sister Marie-Jocelyne), composer
