= Blondell =

Blondell is both a surname and a given name. Notable people with the name include:

== Surname ==
- Joan Blondell (1906–1979), American actress
- Gloria Blondell (1915–1986), American actress
- Ruby Blondell, classicist
- Tina Blondell (born 1953), Austrian-American artist

== Given ==
- Blondell Reynolds Brown (born 1952), American politician
- Blondell Wayne Tatum, fictional character created by Carl Hiaasen

== See also ==
- Blondel (disambiguation)
