= Collège Marie-Anne =

Famous Catholic school in Haiti

Coordinates: 18.54°N 72.319°W

Information
- Religious affiliation: Sisters of Saint Anne
- Established: 1965; 61 years ago
- Enrollment: c.1,400

Collège Marie-Anne is a Catholic school founded in Port-au-Prince, Haiti in 1965 and transplanted to the parish of Christ-Roi in the borough of Bourdon in 1971. It is an institution directed by the Congregation of Sisters of St. Ann (S.S.A), founded in 1850 in Canada by Esther Blondin, today known as the Blessed Mother Marie-Anne.

== Structure ==
The school follows the Haitian education system, and is divided into a primary school of six classes, and a secondary school of seven classes.

The Sisters share the directing roles with non-religious staff of the school. Manfred Guyto has a managerial role in the secondary school, while M. Mona and M. Lubin run the primary school. Sister Marie Myrtha Marcelin, S.S.A., is the principal of the school.

The school has a higher education extension, Christ The King Secretarial School, also located in Christ-Roi, Bourdon.

== New school ==
The school building was destroyed in the historic earthquake which hit Haiti in January 2010. A new building was constructed through close cooperation between the members of the General Administration of the Sisters of Saint Anne, the Sisters in Haiti, Sisters in other provinces and the support of the Tzu Chi Foundation. It was completed and dedicated in May 2013. The total enrollment of the school is currently some 1,400 students.

== Notable alumni ==
- Fabienne Colas, actress
