= List of shipwrecks in July 1858 =

The list of shipwrecks in July 1858 includes ships sunk, foundered, wrecked, grounded, or otherwise lost during July 1858.

== 1 July ==
List of shipwrecks: 1 July 1858
Ship	State	Description
Bernhardine	Kingdom of Hanover	The schooner was wrecked on the Flytaren Rocks, off Gotland, Sweden. Her crew were rescued. She was on a voyage from West Hartlepool, County Durham, United Kingdom to Saint Petersburg, Russia.
Blondine	United Kingdom	The brig was wrecked at the mouth of the Bonny River.

== 2 July ==
List of shipwrecks: 2 July 1858
Ship	State	Description
Adria Dorica	Papal States	The full-rigged ship foundered off the Portuguese coast. Her crew were rescued by the brigantine Hilda (Norway). Adria Dorica was on her maiden voyage, from Porto-Longone, Grand Duchy of Tuscany to Newport, Monmouthshire, United Kingdom.
Betty and Peggy	United Kingdom	The sloop foundered off Rhyl, Denbighshire. Her crew were rescued. She was on a voyage from Bangor, Caernarfonshire to Liverpool, Lancashire.
Trusty	United Kingdom	The ship ran aground at Vigo, Spain. She was on a voyage from Vigp to North Shields. She was refloated and resumed her voyage.

== 3 July ==
List of shipwrecks: 3 July 1858
Ship	State	Description
Josephine	Sweden	The ship sprang a leak and foundered off Halle. Her crew were rescued.
Maria	United Kingdom	The schooner was driven ashore as Seacombe, Cheshire.
Mary	United Kingdom	The brig foundered off Hartland Point, Devon. Her crew were rescued by the schooner Astrea (United Kingdom). Mary was on a voyage from Saundersfoot, Pembrokeshire to King's Lynn, Norfolk.
Mary Clarke	(United Kingdom of Great Britain and Ireland) New Zealand	The brig was wrecked on a reef close to Waitara, Taranaki.

== 4 July ==
List of shipwrecks: 4 July 1858
Ship	State	Description
Emily	United Kingdom	The ship ran aground on the West Hoyle Bank, in Liverpool Bay. She was on a voyage from Liverpool, Lancashire to Dublin. She was refloated on 8 July and put back to Liverpool.
Husseredieh	Ottoman Navy	The frigate caught fire at the Golden Horn and was scuttled.

== 5 July ==
List of shipwrecks: 5 July 1858
Ship	State	Description
Florence	United Kingdom	The ship sank at Calais, France.
Thomas and John	United Kingdom	The ship departed from Saint Petersburg, Russia for London. No further trace, presumed foundered with the loss of all hands.

== 6 July ==
List of shipwrecks: 6 July 1858
Ship	State	Description
Chain Rock	United Kingdom	The ship was wrecked in Fortune Bay. Her crew were rescued. She was on a voyage from Charlottetown, Prince Edward Island, British North America to Limerick.
Crown	United Kingdom	The brig sprang a leak and was abandoned in the North Sea 60 to 70 nautical miles (110 to 130 km; 69 to 81 mi) off Heligoland. Her crew were rescued. She was on a voyage from Hamburg to South Shields, County Durham
Rippon	United Kingdom	The ship was abandoned in the North Sea. Her crew were rescued by Anemone (United Kingdom).
Sea Breeze	United States	The barque was driven ashore at Punta Mala, Spain. She was refloated and taken in to Gibraltar, where she arrived on 12 July in a leaky condition.

== 7 July ==
List of shipwrecks: 7 July 1858
Ship	State	Description
Maas Nymph	Belgium	The ship ran aground off "Falconera", Ottoman Empire. She was on a voyage from Newcastle upon Tyne, Northumberland, United Kingdom to Trieste. She was later refloated and resumed her voyage, arriving at Triest on 14 July.
R. L. Gilchrist	United States	The full-rigged ship was destroyed by fire at Havre de Grâce, Seine-Inférieure.
Thankful	United Kingdom	The ship ran aground at Figueira da Foz, Portugal. She was on a voyage from Sunderland, County Durham to Figueira da Foz. She had been refloated by 15 July and taken in to Figueira da Foz in a severely damaged condition.

== 8 July ==
List of shipwrecks: 8 July 1858
Ship	State	Description
Concordia	United Kingdom	The ship foundered in the Mediterranean Sea 90 nautical miles (170 km) west of Sardinia. Her crew were rescued. She was on a voyage from Agrigento, Sicily to Newcastle upon Tyne, Northumberland.
Ericsson	United States	The steamship ran aground in the Potomac River 80 nautical miles (150 km) from Washington, D.C.
Manuel	Spain	The brig ran aground on The Smalls and sank. Her crew were rescued by the steamship Solva (United Kingdom). She was on a voyage from Liverpool, Lancashire, United Kingdom to Havana, Cuba.
West	United States	The brig was driven ashore on the coast of Florida. A crew member was rescued from a boat on 10 July by Magdaline (Bremen). West was on a voyage from Galveston, Texas to London, United Kingdom.

== 9 July ==
List of shipwrecks: 9 July 1858
Ship	State	Description
Eulalia	United Kingdom	The brigantine struck the Sturmskail Rock, off Scalpay, Outer Hebrides and was abandoned. She was on a voyage from Liverpool, Lancashire to Dunbar, Lothian.

== 10 July ==
List of shipwrecks: 10 July 1858
Ship	State	Description
Hildur	Sweden	The barque was wrecked at "St. Eugene", Algeria. She was on a voyage from Gothenburg to Algiers, Algeria.

== 11 July ==
List of shipwrecks: 11 July 1858
Ship	State	Description
Karoe	United Kingdom	The ship ran aground in the Clyde at Erskine Ferry, Renfrewshire. She was on a voyage from Glasgow, Renfrewshire to Demerara, British Guiana.
Little Polly	Flag unknown	The steamship collided with Tacnare (Paraguayan Navy) and sank in the Paraguay River 100 nautical miles (190 km) downstream of Asunción, Paraguay.
William Skee	United Kingdom	The ship was driven ashore at Sandhammaren, Sweden. She was on a voyage from Vyborg, Grand Duchy of Finland to Hull, Yorkshire.

== 12 July ==
List of shipwrecks: 12 July 1858
Ship	State	Description
Dutchman	United Kingdom	The steamship ran aground at Cape Vellana, Portugal and was damaged. She was on a voyage from Odesa to London.
Freedom	United Kingdom	The brig sprang a leak and sank in the North Sea off Cromer, Norfolk. Her crew were rescued by Restless (United Kingdom). Freedom was on a voyage from Sunderland, County Durham to London.
Juliane	Kingdom of Hanover	The schooner sprang a leak and was beached at Harwich, Essex, United Kingdom. She was on a voyage from Stralsund to London.
Lioness	United Kingdom	The steamship ran aground on the West Hoyle Bank, in Liverpool Bay. She was on a voyage from Liverpool, Lancashire to Rhyl. Denbighshire. She was refloated.

== 13 July ==
List of shipwrecks: 13 July 1858
Ship	State	Description
Emily	United Kingdom	The full-rigged ship ran aground in the Belize River. She was on a voyage from Belize City, British Honduras to Queenstown, County Cork. She was refloated the next day with assistance from HMS Leopard (Royal Navy).
Euphrasia	United Kingdom	The ship was driven ashore at Manasquan, New Jersey, United States. She was on a voyage from Newcastle upon Tyne, Northumberland to New York, United States. She was refloated on 18 July and towed in to New York in a severely leaky condition.
Julian de Uazueta	Spain	The ship ran aground and was severely damaged at Plymouth, Devon, United Kingdom. She was on a voyage from Havana, Cuba to Plymouth.
Lioness	United Kingdom	The steamship ran aground on the West Hoyle Bank, in Liverpool Bay. She was on a voyage from Liverpool, Lancashire to Rhyl, Denbighshire.

== 14 July ==
List of shipwrecks: 14 July 1858
Ship	State	Description
Eclipse	United Kingdom	The whaler, a barque, was sunk by ice in Melville Bay (70°30′N 60°30′W). Her crew survived.
Heroine	United Kingdom	The whaler, a barque, was crushed by ice and sank in Melville Bay (75°30′N 60°30′W). Her crew survived.
Wilhelmine	Hamburg	The brig capsized in the Rio Grande del Norte.

== 15 July ==
List of shipwrecks: 15 July 1858
Ship	State	Description
Alice	United Kingdom	The barque was driven ashore 8 nautical miles (15 km) south of Alibag, India. All on board were rescued. She was on a voyage from Aden to Bombay, India. She had broken up by 4 August.
Cornwall	United Kingdom	Cornwall was wrecked at Pointe aux Canonniers, Mauritius. She was on a voyage from Madras to Mauritius.

== 17 July ==
List of shipwrecks: 17 July 1858
Ship	State	Description
Andromeda	United States	During a voyage from Oswego, New York, to Chicago, Illinois, with a cargo of 800 barrels of salt, the 112-foot (34 m), 207.15-gross register ton two-masted schooner sprang a leak — probably due to hull damage suffered when she transited the Welland Canal — and sank in Lake Michigan at a location off the coast of Wisconsin variously described as about 25 nautical miles (46 km; 29 mi) east of Kewaunee, 40 nautical miles (74 km; 46 mi) northeast of Manitowoc, and 20 nautical miles (37 km; 23 mi) from Sheboygan about 15 nautical miles (28 km; 17 mi) from shore; one source places her wreck at 44°27.363′N 086°59.254′W. Her crew abandoned ship safely and arrived at Manitowoc in a small boat on the morning of 18 July.
Venus	United Kingdom	The schooner was in collision with Centurion (United Kingdom) and sank off the Tuskar Rock with the loss of all but one of her crew. The survivor was rescued by Centurion.

== 19 July ==
List of shipwrecks: 19 July 1858
Ship	State	Description
Elizabeth	Hamburg	The ship departed from Hamburg for Exeter, Devon, United Kingdom. No further trace, presumed foundered with the loss of all hands.
Fanny Whettler	United States	The brig was wrecked on the Renekadore Reef. All on board were rescued.

== 20 July ==
List of shipwrecks: 20 July 1858
Ship	State	Description
Greifswald	Greifswald	The barque ran aground at Lisbon, Portugal. She was on a voyage from Odesa to Queenstown, County Cork, United Kingdom. She was refloated with the assistance of NRP Mindello (Portuguese Navy).
Satellite	United Kingdom	The brig was driven ashore east of Gibraltar. She was on a voyage from Galaţi, Ottoman Empire to a British port. She was refloated.

== 21 July ==
List of shipwrecks: 21 July 1858
Ship	State	Description
Elizabeth	Kingdom of Hanover	The full-rigged ship was abandoned in the North Sea. Her crew were rescued. She was on a voyage from Middlesbrough, Yorkshire, United Kingdom to Varel.
Kunigunde	Kingdom of Hanover	The koff foundered in the North Sea. Her crew were rescued. She was on a voyage from Middlesbrough to the Weser.

== 22 July ==
List of shipwrecks: 22 July 1858
Ship	State	Description
Mary	United Kingdom	The schooner was wrecked near Point Isabella, Fernando Po, Spanish Guinea. She was on a voyage from Liverpool, Lancashire to the British Cameroons.

== 23 July ==
List of shipwrecks: 23 July 1858
Ship	State	Description
Gerhardina	Flag unknown	The ship was driven ashore near Roquetas, Spain. She was on a voyage from Galaţi, Ottoman Empire to a British port.
Juliane	Hamburg	The ship ran aground near Cuxhaven. She was on a voyage from London, United Kingdom to Hamburg. She was refloated the next day and resumed her voyage.
Naval Brigade	United Kingdom	The ship driven ashore at Diamond Harbour, India. She was on a voyage from Liverpool, Lancashire to Calcutta, India. She was refloated.
Pelican	United Kingdom	The ship was driven ashore at Point La Schiese, Malta. She was on a voyage from Newcastle upon Tyne, Northumberland to Malta. She was refloated the next day.

== 24 July ==
List of shipwrecks: 24 July 1858
Ship	State	Description
Annie	United Kingdom	The schooner was abandoned in Liverpool Bay by all but one of her crew. She was on a voyage from Stranraer, Wigtownshire to Liverpool, Lancashire. She was subsequently taken in to port.
Ivy	United Kingdom	The schooner foundered in the North Sea off the coast of County Durham with the loss of a crew member. She was on a voyage from Port Mulgrave, Yorkshire to Newcastle upon Tyne, Northumberland.
Seraphia	Prussia	The ship was sighted whilst on a voyage from Königsberg to Bruges, West Flanders, Belgium. No further trace, presumed foundered with the loss of all hands.
Wells	United Kingdom	The ship was driven ashore at the Landguard Fort, Harwich, Essex. She was refloated on 27 July and taken in to Harwich.

== 25 July ==
List of shipwrecks: 25 July 1858
Ship	State	Description
Alice	United Kingdom	The schooner was driven ashore at Cardigan. She was on a voyage from Barrow-in-Furness, Lancashire to Port Talbot, Glamorgan.
Blanche	United Kingdom	The schooner was wrecked on the North Bank, in Liverpool Bay. Her crew were rescued by the Hoylake Lifeboat.
Countess of Durham	United Kingdom	The barque was driven ashore at Fort de Ruyter, Vlissingen, Zeeland, Netherlands. Her crew were rescued. She was on a voyage from Liverpool, Lancashire to Antwerp, Belgium. She had been refloated and taken in to Vlissingen by 16 August.
Duke of Richmond	United Kingdom	The smack was driven ashore and wrecked near Peel, Isle of Man with the loss of one of her three crew. She was on a voyage from Portaferry, County Down to Whitehaven, Cumberland.
Elisaph	United Kingdom	The ship foundered in the North Sea off Flamborough Head, Yorkshire. Her crew were rescued by the brigantine Providence (United Kingdom). Elisaph was on a voyage from the River Tyne to Wells-next-the-sea, Norfolk.
Eliza	United Kingdom	The schooner was driven ashore at Rossall, Lancashire. She was on a voyage from Barrow-in-Furness, Lancashire to Birkenhead, Cheshire. She was refloated on 26 July. An attempt was made to take her in to Fleetwood, but she ran aground and sank. She had been refloated by 29 July and towed to Barrow-in-Furness for repairs.
Elizabeth	United Kingdom	The sloop foundered in the Irish Sea with the loss of all on board. She was on a voyage from Carlisle, Cumberland to Saltney, Cheshire.
Felix	Russia	The ship foundered in the Dogger Bank. Her crew survived.
Frau Elizabeth	Kingdom of Hanover	The ship foundered in the Dogger Bank. She was on a voyage from Varel to Middlesbrough, Yorkshire.
Gazelle	United Kingdom	The schooner was driven ashore near Peel. She was on a voyage from Whitehaven to Newcastle upon Tyne, Northumberland. She was refloated and taken in to Peel.
Gem	United Kingdom	The fishing smack was driven ashore on the Middleton Sands and damaged.
Grace	United Kingdom	The ship foundered in the North Sea off Flamborough Head. Her crew were rescued by the full-rigged ship Huguenot (United Kingdom).
Helen Sophie	Grand Duchy of Oldenburg	The barque foundered in the Dogger Bank.
Jane	United Kingdom	The schooner was wrecked on the North Bank, in Liverpool Bay. Her crew were rescued by a lifeboat. She was on a voyage from Beaumaris, Anglesey to Liverpool. She was refloated on 30 July with assistance from a tug and beached at Egremont, Lancashire.
Jan Jacob	Netherlands	The ship foundered in the Friesche Gat with the loss of all hands. She was on a voyage from South Shields, County Durham, United Kingdom to Groningen.
John H. Elliot	United States	The full-rigged ship was driven ashore at the Rammekens Castle, Vlissingen. She was refloated with the assistance of two steamships and taken in to Terneuzen, Zeeland.
Joy	United Kingdom	The schooner foundered in the north Sea off the coast of County Durham with the loss of a crew member. She was on a voyage from Port Mulgrave, Yorkshire to the River Tyne.
Lady Newborough	United Kingdom	The ship was wrecked near Leasowe, Cheshire. She was on a voyage from Liverpool to Caernarfon.
Minstral	United Kingdom	The ship was driven onto Ted's Bank, in Liverpool Bay 4 nautical miles (7.4 km) west north west of Southport, Lancashire and was wrecked. Her three crew were rescued by the Southport Lifeboat. She was on a voyage from Barrow-in-Furness to Ellesmere, Cheshire.
Mosquito	United Kingdom	The yacht was destroyed by fire at Rotherhithe, Surrey.
Neva	United Kingdom	The ship foundered in the North Sea off Schiermonnikoog, Groningen, Netherlands. Her crew were rescued by Marianne Jacoba Berendina (Netherlands). Neva was on a voyage from South Shields to the Nieuw Diep.
Providence	United Kingdom	The brigantine was abandoned in the North Sea 10 nautical miles (19 km) off Flamborough Head, Yorkshire. Her crew were rescued.
Rifleman	United Kingdom	The schooner ran aground on the Leman Sand, in the North Sea. The crew took to the boats. One crew member was rescued the next day by the brig Roberts ( Kingdom of the Two Sicilies). Rifleman was on a voyage from South Shields to Rouen, Seine-Inférieure, France.
Tarporley	United Kingdom	The Mersey Flat was driven ashore at Sellafield, Cumberland. Her three crew were presumed lost. She was on a voyage from Carlisle to Saltney.
Thornton	United Kingdom	The ship was driven ashore in the River Mersey. She was on a voyage from New York, United States to Liverpool, Lancashire. She was refloated.
Venus	United Kingdom	The brig foundered in the Dogger Bank. Her crew were rescued by the smack Halifax (United Kingdom). Venus was on a voyage from Hartlepool, County Durham to Gothenburg, Sweden.
Wolverton	United Kingdom	The Mersey Flat was driven ashore and wrecked at Holyhead, Anglesey. She was on a voyage from Liverpool to Swansea, Glamorgan.
Zorilda	United Kingdom	The ship foundered in the North Sea off the Dudgeon Sandbank. Her crew were rescued. She was on a voyage from Hartlepool, County Durham to London.

== 26 July ==
List of shipwrecks: 26 July 1858
Ship	State	Description
Alwine	Hamburg	The ship was driven ashore on Rømø, Duchy of Schleswig.
Corsair	United Kingdom	The ship was driven ashore and wrecked at Makkum, Friesland, Netherlands. She was on a voyage from Amsterdam, North Holland, Netherlands to Sunderland, County Durham.
Denier	United Kingdom	The brig was abandoned in the North Sea 70 nautical miles (130 km) north west of Heligoland. Her crew were rescued by George and James (United Kingdom).
E. Bulkley	United States	The ship ran aground off the coast of Glamorgan, United Kingdom. She was on a voyage from Cardiff, Glamorgan to New York. She was refloated and taken in to Penarth, Glamorgan.
Otseonthe	United States	The ship caught fire at Key West, Florida and was scuttled. She was refloated on 8 August, but was declared a total loss.
Unternehmung	Kingdom of Hanover	The schooner was driven ashore on Sylt, Duchy of Schleswig. Her crew were rescued. She was on a voyage from Newcastle upon Tyne, Northumberland, United Kingdom to Hamburg.
Venus	United Kingdom	The brig foundered in the Dogger Bank.

== 27 July ==
List of shipwrecks: 27 July 1858
Ship	State	Description
Black Boy	United Kingdom	The brig capsized off Ottendorf, Duchy of Schleswig.
Bolivar	United Kingdom	The ship ran aground at the mouth of the Dange.
Clelie	France	The lugger was driven ashore on the Tegelens Platte, in the North Sea.
Elizabeth	United Kingdom	The ship sank off Borkum, Kingdom of Hanover. Her crew were rescued by George and James (United Kingdom).
Maria Catherina	Netherlands	The galiot foundered in the North Sea. Her crew were rescued by Hermasna Welwink (Netherlands). Maria Catharina was on a voyage from Saint Petersburg, Russia to London, United Kingdom.
Oline Cecilia	Stettin	The ship was wrecked at Ängelholm, Sweden. Her crew were rescued. She was on a voyage from London to Stettin.
Paris	United Kingdom	The ship was driven ashore and wrecked at Degerhamn, Sweden. Her crew survived. She was on a voyage from Kronstadt, Russia to London.
Sir Robert Peel	United Kingdom	The ship was driven ashore near Brünsbuttel, Duchy of Schleswig.
Vier Bruder	Stettin	The ship was wrecked near Båstad, Sweden. Her crew were rescued. She was on a voyage from Sunderland, County Durham, United Kingdom to Stettin.
Zealous	United Kingdom	The ship ran aground at Memel. She was on a voyage from Memel to Bridport, Dorset.

== 28 July ==
List of shipwrecks: 28 July 1858
Ship	State	Description
Albatross	Norway	The ship ran aground in the River Tees and was severely damaged. She was on a voyage from Sundsvall to Stockton-on-Tees, County Durham, United Kingdom.
Alexander Johnston	United Kingdom	The barque was abandoned in the Atlantic Ocean (47°14′N 7°40′W). Her crew were rescued by the schooner Sapphire (United Kingdom). Alexander Johnston was on a voyage from South Shields, County Durham to Barcelona, Spain.
Frau Catherina	Kingdom of Hanover	The ship sank off Norderney. She was on a voyage from Sunderland, County Durham to the Elbe.
Gazelle	United Kingdom	The schooner sprang a leak and was beached near Peel, Isle of Man. She was on a voyage from Whitehaven, Cumberland to Newcastle upon Tyne, Northumberland. She was refloated and taken in to Peel.
Iris Creak	United Kingdom	The ship struck the pier and was driven ashore at Lowestoft, Suffolk. She was on a voyage from South Shields to Lowestoft. She was refloated.
Rose	United Kingdom	The steamship ran aground in the Copeland Islands, County Down. She was on a voyage from Morecambe, Lancashire to Belfast, County Antrim. She was refloated the next day with the assistance of HMS Badger (Royal Navy) and the steamship Wonder (United Kingdom) but consequently sank. Both people on board were rescued.
Vier Bruders	Stettin	The ship was wrecked near "Bustad". Her crew were rescued. She was on a voyage from Sunderland, County Durham to Stettin.

== 29 July ==
List of shipwrecks: 29 July 1858
Ship	State	Description
Theresa and Maria	Flag unknown	The brig struck a rock off the Norwegian coast and was wrecked. Her crew were rescued. She was on a voyage from Dublin, United Kingdom to Arkhangelsk, Russia.
Trese and Elise	Kingdom of Hanover	The koff ran aground on the Kaausand, in the North Sea. She was on a voyage from Sunderland, County Durham, United Kingdom to Cuxhaven. She was refloated the next day.

== 30 July ==
List of shipwrecks: 30 July 1858
Ship	State	Description
Glasgow	United Kingdom	The ship was driven ashore near Lindisfarne, Northumberland. She was on a voyage from Lindisfarne to North Sunderland, County Durham. She was refloated the next day and taken in to Lindisfarne.

== 31 July ==
List of shipwrecks: 31 July 1858
Ship	State	Description
Casimir	France	The tug was run into by the steamship British Queen (United Kingdom) and sank at Havre de Grâce, Seine-Inférieure. Her crew were rescued by British Queen.
Emily	United Kingdom	The steamship struck the lock wall in the Newry Canal and sank. She was on a voyage from Newry, County Antrim to Bordeaux, Gironde.
Jane	United Kingdom	The ship struck a sunken rock in the Seine. She was on a voyage from Rouen, Seine-Inférieure to Bristol, Gloucestershire. She was towed in to Havre de Grâce in a leaky condition.

== Unknown date ==
List of shipwrecks: Unknown date in July 1858
Ship	State	Description
Alma	United Kingdom	The ship was driven ashore on Læsø, Denmark. She was on a voyage from Rostock to London. She was refloated and taken in to Frederikshavn, Denmark in a leaky condition.
August and Bertha	Hamburg	The barque ran aground on the Blanor Sand, off the mouth of the Eider between 22 and 27 July. She was on a voyage from Hartlepool, County Durham, United Kingdom to Hamburg.
Golden Era	United Kingdom	The ship was wrecked at Pooree Point, India before 3 July. Her crew were rescued. She was on a voyage from Akyab, Burma to a European port.
Hermann	Kingdom of Hanover	The galeas was lost in the Eider with the loss of all but one of her crew.
John Purdie	United Kingdom	The schooner ran aground. She was on a voyage from Smyrna, Ottoman Empire to Hamburg. She was refloated and taken in to Tönning, Duchy of Holstein, where she arrived on 21 July in a leaky condition.
Lady Raglan	United Kingdom	The ship ran aground on Helen's Shoal, in the Pacific Ocean between 10 and 14 July. She was on a voyage from Foo Choo Foo, China to Sydney, New South Wales. She was abandoned after four days, her crew were rescued by Nyverheid (Netherlands).
Laidmans	United Kingdom	The ship foundered in the Indian Ocean off Trincomalee, Ceylon before 26 July. She was on a voyage from Rangoon, Burma to Cochin, India.
Minerva	United Kingdom	The brig was abandoned off Cork with the loss of all but one of her crew. He was rescued on 29 July by Middlesex (United Kingdom). Minerva was on a voyage from Galaţi, Ottoman Empire to a British port.
Queen	(United Kingdom of Great Britain and Ireland) Jersey	The barque was wrecked on the coast of Patagonia, Argentina before 14 July. Her crew were rescued by the full-rigged ship Don Pedrogos (France).
Therese	United Kingdom	The barque was abandoned in the Baltic Sea before 30 July. Her crew were rescued by Severus ( Stettin). Therese was on a voyage from Danzig to Fowey, Cornwall.
Wansbeck	United Kingdom	The ship ran aground on the Stoney Binks, off the mouth of the Humber. Her crew were rescued by a pilot boat. She was on a voyage from South Shields, County Durham to Rotterdam, South Holland, Netherlands. She was refloated on 22 July with assistance from the paddle tug British Hero and taken in to Grimsby, Lincolnshire in a severely leaky condition.
Water Witch	(United Kingdom of Great Britain and Ireland) Tasmania	The schooner was wrecked at the mouth of the Forth River.
Wellington	United Kingdom	The ship was driven ashore at Holyhead, Anglesey before 26 July. She was on a voyage from Liverpool, Lancashire to Swansea, Glamorgan. She was refloated on 14 August and towed back to Liverpool.
Zampa	Norway	The ship was wrecked off the Orkney Islands, United Kingdom before 5 July.
