= Blondeau River =

Blondeau River may refer to:

- Blondeau River (Chibougamau Lake), Quebec, Canada
- Blondeau River (Fraser River), Quebec, Canada
