= James Augustus Blondel =

French physician

- Died: 4 October 1734
- Occupation: Physician

James Augustus Blondel (died 4 October 1734) was a French physician.

== Biography ==
Blondel was a native of Paris, and received his medical education at Leyden, where he graduated M.D. 17 July 1692, his thesis, which was published, being ‘Dissertatio de Crisibus.’ He settled as a physician in London, and was admitted licentiate of the College of Physicians 26 March 1711. In 1720, he published anonymously ‘The Strength of Imagination of Pregnant Women Examined, and the opinion that marks and deformities in children arise from thence, demonstrated to be a vulgar error.' To this work Dr. Daniel Turner replied in the twelfth chapter of his treatise on the ‘Diseases of the Skin,' and he returned to the subject in his treatise on ‘Gleets.' In answer to the statements of Turner, Blondel published in 1729 ‘The Power of the Mother's Imagination over the Fœtus examined, in reply to Dr. Turner.’ This pamphlet, to which Dr. Turner wrote a special reply, was published in French at Leyden in 1737, in Dutch at Rotterdam in 1737, and in German at Strasbourg in 1756. He died 4 October 1734, and was buried at Stepney.
