= Nicolas Blondeau =

French riding instructor (1955–2026)

- Born: 5 December 1955; Châtellerault, France
- Died: 22 January 2026 (aged 70)
- Occupation: Riding instructor

Nicolas Blondeau (5 December 1955 – 22 January 2026) was a French riding instructor and author. He is the founder of L’École Blondeau, an equestrian facility in Saumur, France.

== Life and career ==
Nicolas Blondeau was born on 5 December 1955 in Châtellerault, France. He started getting interest to horses thanks to his father and started riding horses and ponies when he is a teenager. He received the silver-gilt medal from the French Académie d'Agriculture in 2006. Blondeau died on 22 January 2026, at the age of 70.
