= Armand Donon =

French banker

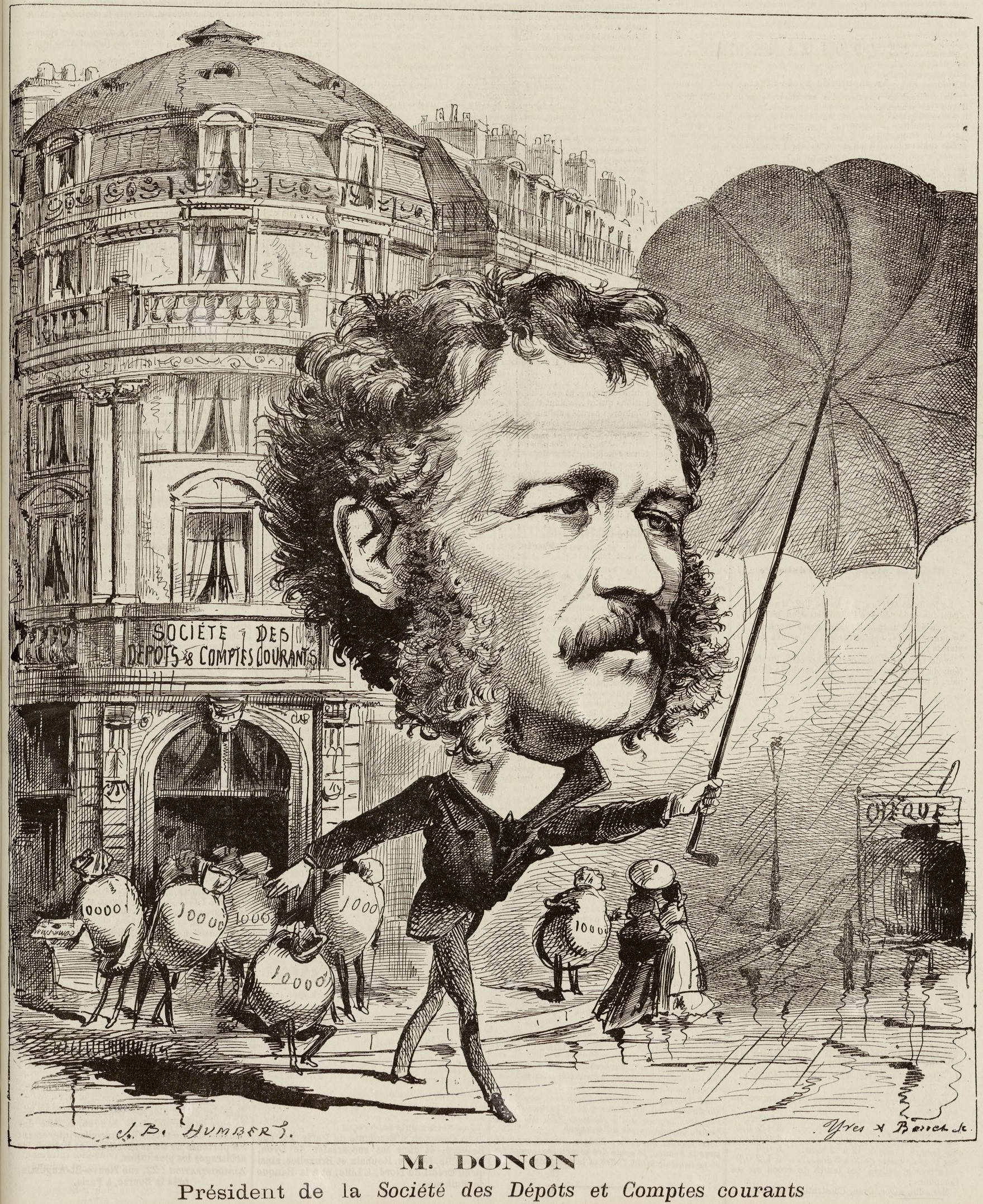
- Caricature of Donon in Comic-Finance, 1873, showing him in front of the iconic head office of Société des Dépôts et Comptes Courants at 2, Place de l'Opéra
- Born: April 14, 1818; Pontoise, France
- Died: April 11, 1902 (aged 83); France
- Education: Collège Sainte-Barbe
- Occupation: Banker
- Known for: Banking partner of Charles, Duc de Morny

Pierre Armand Donon (14 April 1818, Pontoise - 11 April 1902, Neuilly-sur-Seine) was a French banker. During his heyday around 1860 he was known as the banking partner of Charles, Duc de Morny, a key figure of the Second French Empire, with whom he partnered for the early development of Deauville.

== Biography ==
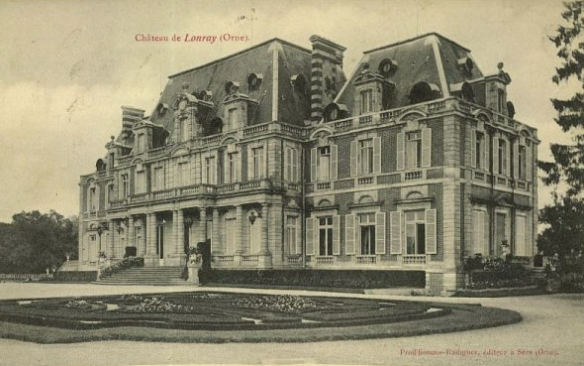
Chateau of Lonrai, acquired by Donon in 1863

Pierre-Armand Donon was the son of merchant Pierre-Amédée Donon (1792-1880) and his wife Marie-Caroline-Armande, née Morand. He studied in Paris at the Collège Sainte-Barbe.

By 1845, Donon was a partner at Calon jeune & Cie, a private banking house. On 23 December 1851, immediately after the 1851 coup d'état, he co-founded the new bank Donon, Aubry, Gautier & Cie together with partners Maurice Aubry and Jules Gautier.

On 5 April 1853, Donon married Henriette-Félicité Staub, the daughter of a prominent Parisian taylor. They had a son, Jacques-Pierre (1854-1913), and two daughters, Thérèse-Jeanne-Marie (1857-1897) and Jeanne-Mathilde-Elisabeth (1860-1919).

Donon served as consul-general of the Ottoman Empire from 1853 to 1880, when his son succeeded him in that capacity. By 1868 he had been awarded the honor of Grand Officer of the Ottoman Order of the Medjidie, elevated to Grand Cross by 1881.

In 1859, Donon was instrumental in the creation of the Crédit Industriel et Commercial (CIC), which was supported by the politically influential Duke of Morny, as a competitor to the Pereire brothers's Crédit Mobilier on the model of successful British depository banks such as the London and Westminster Bank. In 1863, feeling a loss of direct control over the CIC, he created the Société des Dépôts et Comptes Courants (SDCC) and became the new institution's chairman. As the SDCC and CIC were effectively competitors, Donon stopped attending board meetings of the CIC in August 1866 and formally left the board in 1871.

In 1859, together with Morny's physician Joseph Francis Olliffe and Morny himself, Donon bought 177 hectares of seafront land west of the Touques river in Normandy, which formed the basis for the later development of Deauville.

From 1868, Donon was mayor of the village of Lonrai in the Orne department, where in 1863 he had acquired a large, newly built country house. He ran unsuccessfully for deputy of Orne in the legislative elections of 1871 and 1876.

From the late 1870s, Donon engaged in increasingly reckless risk-taking at the Société des Dépôts et Comptes Courants and withheld the relevant information from his board. In 1887, the private bank Donon, Aubry, Gautier & Cie which Donon had created in 1851 went into liquidation. The SDCC's situation became untenable and developed into a panic in 1891, when the Bank of France provided emergency liquidity and eventually liquidated the bank on 7 April 1891. The SDCC was subsequently absorbed in 1892 by the Comptoir national d'escompte de Paris. In 1892, Donon relinquished his role of mayor of Lonrai and sold his mansion there. On 22 July 1893, Donon was convicted and sentenced to six months imprisonment, which he served at the La Santé Prison, and a fine of three thousand francs. On 12 March 1894, he was stripped of the Legion of Honour that had been awarded to him on 7 February 1855.

== See also ==
- Henri Blondel
- Louis Frémy
- Pereire brothers
