= Henri Blondel =

French architect

Jean Henry Blondel
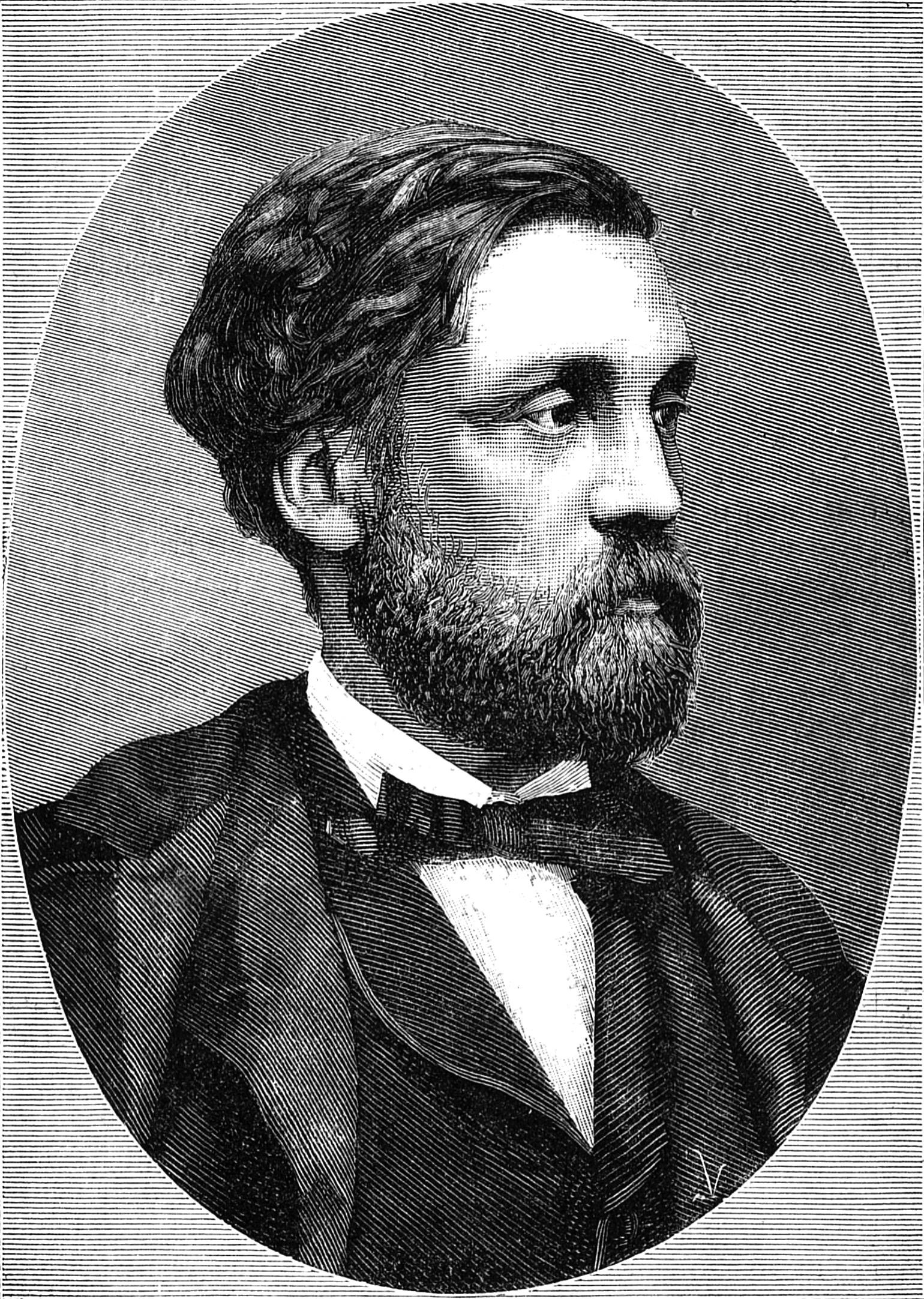
- Henri Blondel in 1880.
- Born: 20 January 1821; Reims, Rhine Province, France
- Died: 14 September 1897 (aged 76); Paris, France
- Occupation: Architect

Jean Henry Blondel (20 January 1821 – 14 September 1897) was a prolific French architect.

Among his works were the Passage du Bourg l'Abbé entrance on the Rue Palestro (1863), the La Belle Jardinière store on Rue du Pont-Neuf (1866-7), Hotel Continental at the corner of Rue de Castiglione and Rue de Rivoli (1876), the Bourse de commerce building (1885-9) and the Rue du Louvre building at 15 Rue du Louvre (1889).

== Biography ==
Blondel was born in Rheims early in 1821, during the period of economic hardships that followed the Napoleonic Wars. He was a pupil at the School of Arts and Crafts (École des arts et métiers) as it was then known) in nearby Châlons-sur-Marne, before moving to Paris where he embarked on an apprenticeship under Auguste Caristie.

He continued his training period, working for the architect François Rolland (1806-1888), and then went on to work for Henri Labrouste (1801-1875) before establishing his own architecture practice around 1855. Blondel was able to profit from the massive redevelopment of central Paris instigated by the emperor Napoleon III, and masterminded at more a detailed level by the Baron Haussmann. The new broad streets and avenues called for the construction of many new buildings, featuring the artistic-heroic style of the Second Empire. Blondel had a long association with banker Armand Donon, with whom he was involved in numerous real estate developments.

He would construct numerous edifices along the new avenues, notably the Boulevard de Sébastopol, the Boulevard Saint-Michel, the Boulevard Saint-Germain and around the Place du Théâtre-Français (as the Place André-Malraux before 1977), often involving a system of block concessions wherein he participated in partnership with his finance providers, the "father and son" Heullant company. A surviving trace of these block concessions can be found in the Journal des débats (newspaper) of 8 July 1868 which includes the list of real estate transactions for Paris, together with the relevant title deeds lodged with the Crédit Foncier de France (national mortgage institution) having a total value of 398 million francs.

On 29 July 1895 Blondel was condemned for bankruptcy by a local court, in respect of indebtedness totalling slightly more than 25 million francs.

== Awards and honours ==
- 1878 Grand Medal of the Academy of Architecture
- ca 1880 Legion of Honour (Knight/Chevalier)
