= Société des Dépôts et Comptes Courants =

French bank

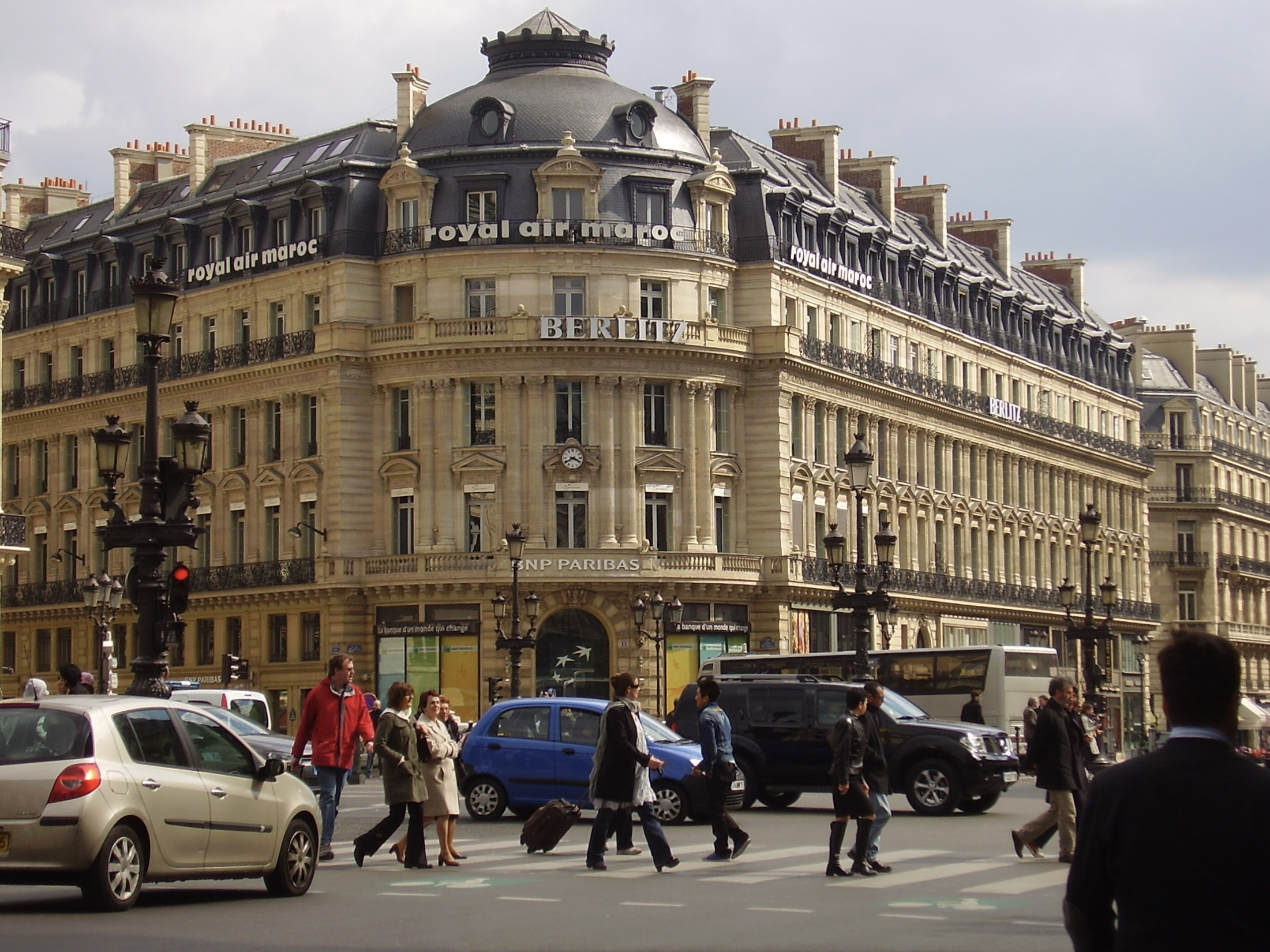
- Building at 2, Place de l'Opéra in Paris, head office of the SDCC from 1869 to 1891
- Company type: Privately held company
- Industry: Financial services
- Founded: 1863
- Founder: Armand Donon
- Defunct: 1891
- Fate: Liquidated
- Successor: Comptoir d'Escompte de Paris
- Headquarters: Paris, France
- Area served: France
- Products: Banking services

The Société des Dépôts et Comptes Courants (French pronunciation: [sɔsjete de depo e kɔ̃t kuʁɑ̃], SDCC) was a French bank, created in 1863 and liquidated in 1891. Its business was subsequently taken over by the recently restructured Comptoir d'Escompte de Paris.

== Overview ==
In 1862–1863, Armand Donon fostered the creation of the Société des Dépôts et Comptes Courants and became the new institution's chairman. The SDCC was formally established by executive order (French: décret) on 6 July 1863. The bank was initially established at 3, rue Ménars in Paris, then on the Place Vendôme, and eventually in 1896 in a new building at 2, place de l'Opéra, at the time one of the most prestigious addresses in Paris.

From the late 1870s, Donon engaged in increasingly reckless risk-taking at the SDCC and withheld the relevant information from the bank's board. The situation became untenable and developed into a bank run on 11 March 1891, which the Bank of France addressed by providing emergency liquidity and eventually winding up the bank on 7 April 1891. The SDCC was subsequently absorbed in 1892 by the Comptoir national d'escompte de Paris.

== See also ==
- Crédit Industriel et Commercial
- List of banks in France
