= Notre Dame Regional Secondary School =

Notre Dame Regional Secondary
- New building entrance of Notre Dame; 2880 Venables Street (opened May 6, 2010)

Location
- 2855 Venables Street; Vancouver, British Columbia, V5K 2T8; Canada; 49.27623°N 123.04471°W

Information
- School type: Independent
- Religious affiliation: Roman Catholic
- Founded: 1953
- School board: Catholic Independent Schools of the Vancouver Archdiocese (CISVA)
- Superintendent: Sandra Marshall
- Principal: Andrea Prout-Bernett
- Grades: 8–12
- Enrollment: 750 (co-ed)
- Language: English
- Area: Renfrew – Hastings Sunrise
- Colours: Navy Blue, White and Silver
- Mascot: Juggler
- Team name: Jugglers
- Website: www.ndrs.org

Notre Dame Regional Secondary is a co-ed Catholic Secondary school in Vancouver, British Columbia, under the administration of Catholic Independent Schools Vancouver Archdiocese (CISVA) school board in Canada. The school participates in sporting events under the name of the "Jugglers", with the team colours of blue, white and silver.

== History ==
Notre Dame's old entrance

In the 1950s, under the invitation of Archbishop William Mark Duke, the Sisters of Charity of Halifax accepted the challenge to help finance a high school for the education of Catholic children in East Vancouver and Burnaby, and in 1953 Notre Dame Regional Secondary opened its doors for the first time.

In 1985, the young Irish priest Fr. Joe Cuddy, was appointed as the Archbishop's Representative for the school. Realizing the need for an improved facility, he created a three-phase plan for the rebuilding of the school. The final phase of the development concludes in the mid-2010s, and at the start of the 2014-2015 school year the renovated school was made fully accessible for use by students and staff.

On May 6, 2010, the doors opened for the new building. The structure has state of the art geothermal heating, photocell activated lighting and washrooms systems, Wi-Fi wireless connections, and SMART Board interactive whiteboards.

== Independent school status ==
Notre Dame Regional Secondary is classified as a Group 1 school under British Columbia's Independent School Act. It receives 50% funding from the Ministry of Education. The school receives no funding for capital costs. It is under charge of the Roman Catholic Archdiocese of Vancouver.

Notre Dame's Education Committee is made up of two elected representatives from each of the feeder parishes, and three pastors elected by the pastors of these parishes. One pastor is elected as Archbishop's Representative for the school.

=== Feeder Parishes ===
The sanctuary of Our Lady (Notre Dame) will be replaced by a grotto dedicated to the Sisters of Charity of Halifax, who founded the school, but no longer teach there.

- Corpus Christi Elementary
- Holy Cross Elementary
- Parish of Immaculate Heart of Mary
- St. Mary's Elementary
- Parish of St. Theresa's
- St. Francis of Assisi Elementary
- St. Helen's Elementary
- St. Jude's Elementary
- Our Lady of Sorrows Elementary
- Parish of Sacred Heart

== Academic performance ==
Notre Dame's school crest of Know/Love/Serve

Notre Dame is ranked by the Fraser Institute; in 2013, it ranked 61st out of 289 schools in the British Columbia Lower Mainland.

98.1% of the students graduate and 85%+ of those students go on to study at colleges and universities across the country.

The school sponsors the Notre Dame Peter Vogel Physics Balsa Bridge Building Contest which is open to all Physics 11 & Physics 12 students (as well as external applicants as per the contest's official rules, first observed at the 40th edition in 2020). Originally known as the Notre Dame Balsa Bridge Building Contest, it was renamed in honor of its founding teacher following his retirement.

The school courses are developed by the following departments: Business, Christian Education, English, Humanities, Information Technologies (IT), Languages, Mathematics, Performing Arts, Physical Education, Science (Chemistry, Biology, Physics, Earth Sciences), Social Studies (World History, Geography, etc.), & Visual Arts.

== Athletic performance ==
Notre Dame's team sports insignia, is modelled after University of Notre Dame's Fighting Irish insignia.

The school competes in the following sports: Basketball, Cross Country, Field Hockey, Football, Golf, Soccer, Track & Field, Volleyball, & Wrestling. Notre Dame is an associated member of BC school sports and has received championships from the association in:

Sport	Gender	Division	Season
Basketball	Girls	"A"	1975–76
Volleyball	Girls	"A"	1987–88
Volleyball	Girls	"AA"	2005–06
Soccer	Girls	"AAA"	1993–94
Soccer	Boys	"AA"	2002–03
Soccer	Boys	"AA"	2006–07
Soccer	Girls	"AA"	2008–09
Wrestling	Coed	n/a	2006

Recently, Notre Dame has gone on to win high school championships in Soccer, Volleyball, Wrestling and Football.

The football program has traditionally ranked among the top teams in British Columbia.

- Shrine Bowl Provincial Championships (pre-1975): Won 6 of 7 appearances
- Frank Gnup AAA Provincial Championships (1975–present): Won 8 of 11 appearances

During the month of December, Notre Dame used to host the Christmas Classic Basketball Tournament in honour of the story "The Juggler of Notre Dame". But due to conflicts with 1st term exams, the school retired the tournament and replaced it with the Juggler Invitational Basketball Tournament which is open to Bantam, Junior Varsity & Varsity boys and girls teams, during the month of January.

Both the Varsity Boys and Girls basketball teams participate in the BC Catholic Basketball Championship, one of the largest tournaments in the province of BC.

== Artistic performance ==
Notre Dame provides students with a variety of performing and non-performing arts. The school provides the following productions in Drama Productions: Concert Band, Jazz Band, Show Choir, Concert Choir, Music, Dance Squad, Photography, Yearbook & Visual Arts.

The theatre has traditionally put on productions that have been a source of entertainment for the community and raised revenue for the Performing Arts at ND.

== Notable alumni ==
- Al Cameron — offensive lineman (Canadian Football League)
- Glen Clark — 31st Premier of British Columbia (1996–99)
- Michael Cuccione - actor/singer as part of the fictional boy band 2gether, cancer research activist
- Lauren Diewold — former child actress
- Leo Groenewegen — offensive linemen, Ottawa Rough Riders, BC Lions, Edmonton Eskimos (Canadian Football League)
- Glen Jackson — linebacker, BC Lions (Canadian Football League, Grey Cup 1985)
- John Malinosky — offensive linemen, Hamilton Tiger-Cats (Canadian Football League, Grey Cup 1986)
- Ante Milanovic-Litre — running back, Calgary Stampeders (Canadian Football League, Grey Cup 2018)
- Lui Passaglia — punter/kicker, BC Lions (Canadian Football League, Grey Cup 1985, 1994, 2000)
- Niko Sigur — midfielder, Hajduk Split (Croatian Football League), Canada men's national soccer team

== Notes ==
old school of Notre Dame Regional Secondary

Notre Dame is one of four Catholic high schools in Vancouver, the others being St. Patrick Regional Secondary School, Vancouver College and Little Flower Academy.

A permit was granted in February 2007 by Vancouver City Council for the right to build a new school facility on the old football practice field. The new building consisted of classrooms to accommodate 750 students. In July 2010, the old building was demolished to make way for Phase II.
