= Frank Gnup AAA Provincial Championships =

Named after Frank Gnup, head coach of the University of British Columbia Thunderbirds football team, from 1955 to 1973.

Frank Gnup died in Vancouver, British Columbia, Canada, on September 27, 1976.

The British Columbian provincial AAA football championships was named in his honour.

== History ==
The Shrine Bowl Provincial Championships gave way to the American style of ranking schools. Schools are divided into three classes by total enrollment in grades 9-11 only: A (0-337 students), AA (340-618 students), and AAA (619 students and up). The championships then became known as Frank Gnup AAA Provincial Championships and the Gary Scott AA Provincial Championships.

The championships are a part of the Subway Bowl held at BC Place Stadium, in the province of British Columbia, and televised across Canada.

== Frank Gnup AAA Provincial Champions ==
Year	Champion	Runner up	Year	Champion	Runner up	Year	Champion	Runner up	Year	Champion	Runner up
1976	Richmond 3	Notre Dame 0	1986	Kamloops 38	South Delta 6	1996	Richmond 25 (OT)	Vancouver College 22	2006	Terry Fox 21	Vancouver College 18
1977	Notre Dame 14	Vancouver College 6	1987	Notre Dame 40	Richmond 6	1997	Richmond 43	W J Mouat 7	2007	Holy Cross 49	St. Thomas More 19
1978	Notre Dame 9 (OT)	West Vancouver 6	1988	Notre Dame 30	Vancouver College 7	1998	Richmond 27	St. Thomas More 20	2008	Terry Fox 57	WJ Mouat 16
1979	Handsworth 20	Kamloops 0	1989	Notre Dame 14	Vancouver College 0	1999	St. Thomas More 29	Pinetree 6	2009	Centennial 38	WJ Mouat 35
1980	Notre Dame 23	Steveston 0	1990	Kamloops 36	Centennial 8	2000	St. Thomas More 46	W J Mouat 12	2010	Vancouver College 28	Terry Fox 14
1981	Kamloops 7	Notre Dame 0	1991	Vancouver College 34	St. Thomas More 3	2001	Carson Graham 41	Vancouver College 8	2011	Mt Douglas 42	WJ Mouat 35
1982	Notre Dame 13	Kamloops 0	1992	W J Mouat 27	Vancouver College 12	2002	W J Mouat 52	Vancouver College 27	2012	Mt Douglas 51	Vancouver College 14
1983	Kamloops 13	Richmond 12	1993	Notre Dame 34	Vancouver College 20	2003	St. Thomas More 20	Rick Hanson 7	2013	Mt Douglas 32	Terry Fox 27
1984	Abbotsford 14	Notre Dame 4	1994	Vancouver College 34	Kamloops 25	2004	Rick Hanson 21	Vancouver College 19	2014	South Delta 55	Mt Douglas 30
1985	Kamloops 20	Vancouver College 7	1995	North Delta 39	W J Mouat 21	2005	W J Mouat 7	Vancouver College 6	2015	Mt Douglas 34	Vancouver College 17
