= Gary Scott AA Provincial Championships =

Canadian high school football championship

The Gary Scott AA Provincial Championships was a high school football championship in Canada. Schools rated AA under the American ranking style are eligible to participate. The championship was a part of the Subway Bowl held at BC Place Stadium, British Columbia, Canada, and was televised across Canada.

== History ==
The Shrine Bowl Provincial Championships in Canada gave way to the American style of ranking high schools for football events. Schools were divided into three classes by total enrollment in grades 9-11 only: A (0-337 students), AA (340-618 students), and AAA (619 students and up). The championships then became known as Frank Gnup AAA Provincial Championships for the AAA category, and the Gary Scott AA Provincial Championships for the AA category. Within each cup, a senior and junior championship was established.

The championships are a part of the Subway Bowl held at BC Place Stadium, in the province of British Columbia, and televised across Canada.

== Gary Scott AA Provincial Champions ==
Year	Champion	Runner up	Year	Champion	Runner up	Year	Champion	Runner up
			1996	Handsworth 20	Windsor 13	2006	Seaquam 21	Hugh Boyd 13
			1997	Windsor 28	Sentinel 27	2007	Handsworth 26	South Delta 7
1988	St. Thomas More 32	Holy Cross 26 (3xOT)	1998	Windsor 7	Sentinel 0	2008	South Delta 16	Seaquam 14
1989	Terry Fox 21	Handsworth 14	1999	Delta 34	John Barsby 13	2009	Mt Douglas 41	Windsor 20
1990	West Vancouver 37	Burnaby Central 7	2000	John Barsby 22	John Oliver 14	2010	John Barsby 43	Handsworth 27
1991	Port Moody 22	South Delta 6	2001	Windsor 36	Ballenas 34	2011	Mission 16	John Barsby 12
1992	John Oliver 15	Carson Graham 0	2002	Ballenas 48	Windsor 21	2012	South Delta 31	Mission 14
1993	Carson Graham 25	Holy Cross 0	2003	Sentinel 34	Handsworth 26	2013	John Barsby 21	Carson Graham 20
1994	North Delta 41	Windsor 6	2004	Windsor 36	Sentinel 6	2014	John Barsby 36	Mission 20
1995	Windsor 38	Norkam 12	2005	Windsor 33	Lord Tweedsmuir 8	2015	Carson Graham 53	Abbotsford 34
