= Adam Konar =

Canadian gridiron football player (born 1993)

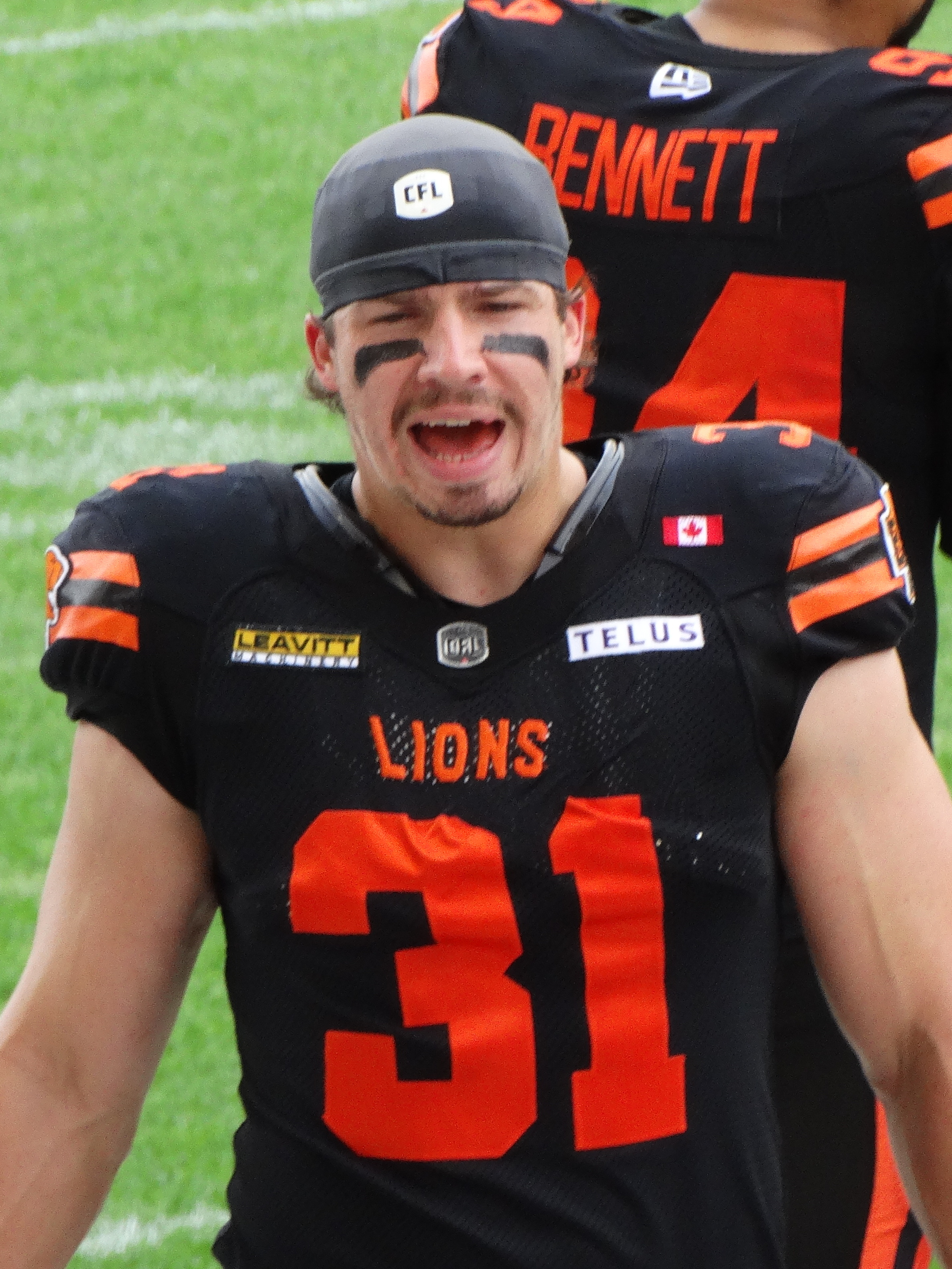
- Konar with the BC Lions in 2025

No. 31 – BC Lions
- Position: Linebacker
- Roster status: Active
- CFL status: National

Personal information
- Born: October 10, 1993 (age 33); Vancouver, British Columbia, Canada
- Listed height: 6 ft 2 in (1.88 m)
- Listed weight: 225 lb (102 kg)

Career information
- High school: Vancouver College
- CJFL: Langley Rams
- University: British Columbia; Calgary
- CFL draft: 2015: 3rd round, 25th overall pick

Career history
- 2015–2018: Edmonton Eskimos
- 2019–2021: BC Lions
- 2022–2023: Edmonton Elks
- 2024: Calgary Stampeders
- 2025–present: BC Lions

Awards and highlights
- Grey Cup champion (2015)
- Stats at CFL.ca

Adam Konar (born October 10, 1993) is a Canadian professional football linebacker for the BC Lions of the Canadian Football League (CFL). He was originally drafted 25th overall in the 2015 CFL draft by the Edmonton Eskimos and played for six non-consecutive seasons with the team. He played CIS football for the Calgary Dinos.

== Early life ==
Konar played high school football for the Fighting Irish of Vancouver College as a running back and linebacker. In 2009, Konar suffered a broken fibula and missed post-season games. He was named MVP of the 2010 Subway Bowl with three touchdowns on offence and two interceptions on defence.

== University career ==
In 2011, Konar played college football as a linebacker for the University of British Columbia (UBC) Thunderbirds. He earned the program's rookie of the year award. Due to poor grades, Konar was forced to leave UBC before the 2012 season and take classes at Capilano University. Instead of playing college football in 2012, he joined the Langley Rams of the Canadian Junior Football League. Konar recorded 16 solo tackles, five sacks, three interceptions, and four fumble recoveries in his one season with the Rams, earning himself the B.C. Football Conference's Outstanding Defensive Player award.

While Konar originally intended to return to UBC after a year with the Rams, he instead decided to transfer to the University of Calgary and play for the Calgary Dinos. Konar cited strong academic support as one reason he transferred to Calgary. He missed the entire 2013 season due to a torn ACL injury suffered on the first day of training camp. In 2014, Konar was named a first team All-Canadian after achieving 34 solo tackles, an interception, and a forced fumble. He recorded a team-high eight tackles in the Dinos' playoff loss against the Manitoba Bisons.

== Professional career ==
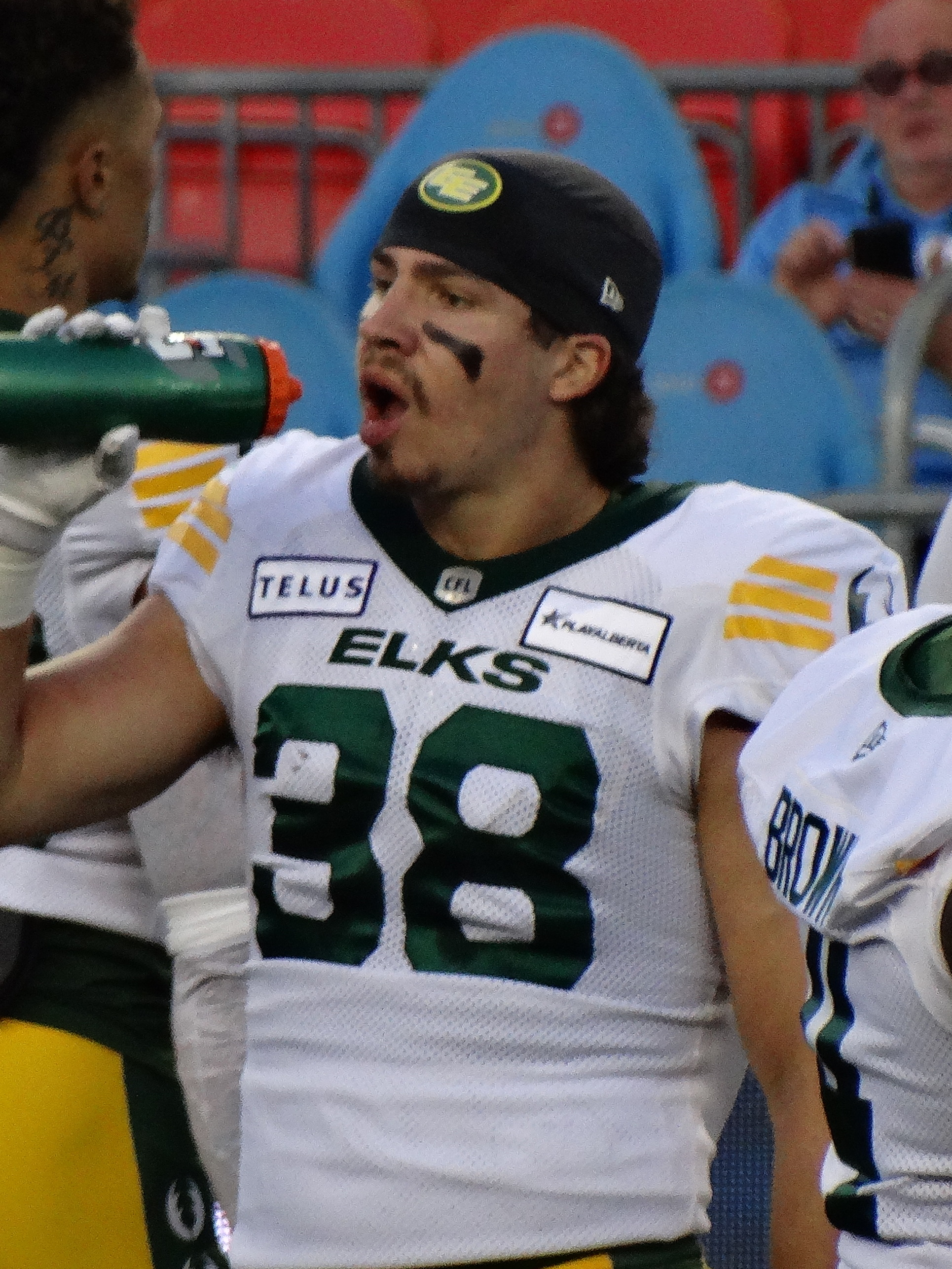
Konar with the Edmonton Elks in 2023

=== Edmonton Eskimos ===
Konar was listed by the CFL Scouting Bureau as the 16th ranked draft prospect in December 2014, but did not appear on the final rankings. He was invited to the national CFL Combine in early 2015. Konar was selected in the third round of the 2015 CFL draft by the Edmonton Eskimos with the 25th overall pick. After making the active roster out of training camp, Konar debuted in the season opener against the Toronto Argonauts on June 27, 2015. He would go on to win the Grey Cup with the Eskimos in his rookie season. He played in 34 games with the Eskimos over four years and was released on the eve of 2019 training camp on May 18, 2019.

=== BC Lions (first stint) ===
Shortly after his release from the Eskimos, Konar signed with his hometown BC Lions on May 20, 2019. He played in 17 regular season games where he had six defensive tackles and eight special teams tackles. He did not play in 2020 due to the cancellation of the 2020 CFL season. In 2021, Konar played in all 14 games of a truncated season where he had six defensive tackles, 13 special teams tackles, and one sack. He signed a contract extension with the Lions on February 3, 2021.

=== Edmonton Elks ===
Konar returned to the Edmonton Elks in free agency on February 8, 2022. He played in all 18 games in 2022 where he had 52 defensive tackles, five special teams tackles, two sacks, one interception, and two forced fumbles. In 2023, he again played in 18 regular season games and recorded a career-high 73 defensive tackles and one special teams tackle. On January 9, 2024, Konar was released by the Elks.

=== Calgary Stampeders ===
On January 22, 2024, it was announced that Konar had signed with the Calgary Stampeders. He became a free agent upon the expiry of his contract on February 11, 2025.

=== BC Lions (second stint) ===
On February 11, 2025, it was announced that Konar had re-signed with the Lions. On September 25, 2025, Konar was placed on the Lions' 6-game injured list, where he spent the remainder of the 2025 season. He played in 14 regular season games where he had two defensive tackles and nine special teams tackles. As a pending free agent in 2026, the Lions announced on December 16, 2025, that Konar had signed a two-year extension with the team.

On July 30, 2026, Konar was placed on the Lions' 1-game injured list. He rejoined the active roster in advance of the Lions' week 11 game against the Calgary Stampeders on August 13, 2026.

== Personal life ==
Adam Konar is the son of Kevin Konar, former linebacker and Grey Cup champion for the BC Lions. Konar is also the cousin of Jamie Boreham, a retired CFL kicker.
