= St. Thomas More Collegiate =

St. Thomas More Collegiate (STMC)
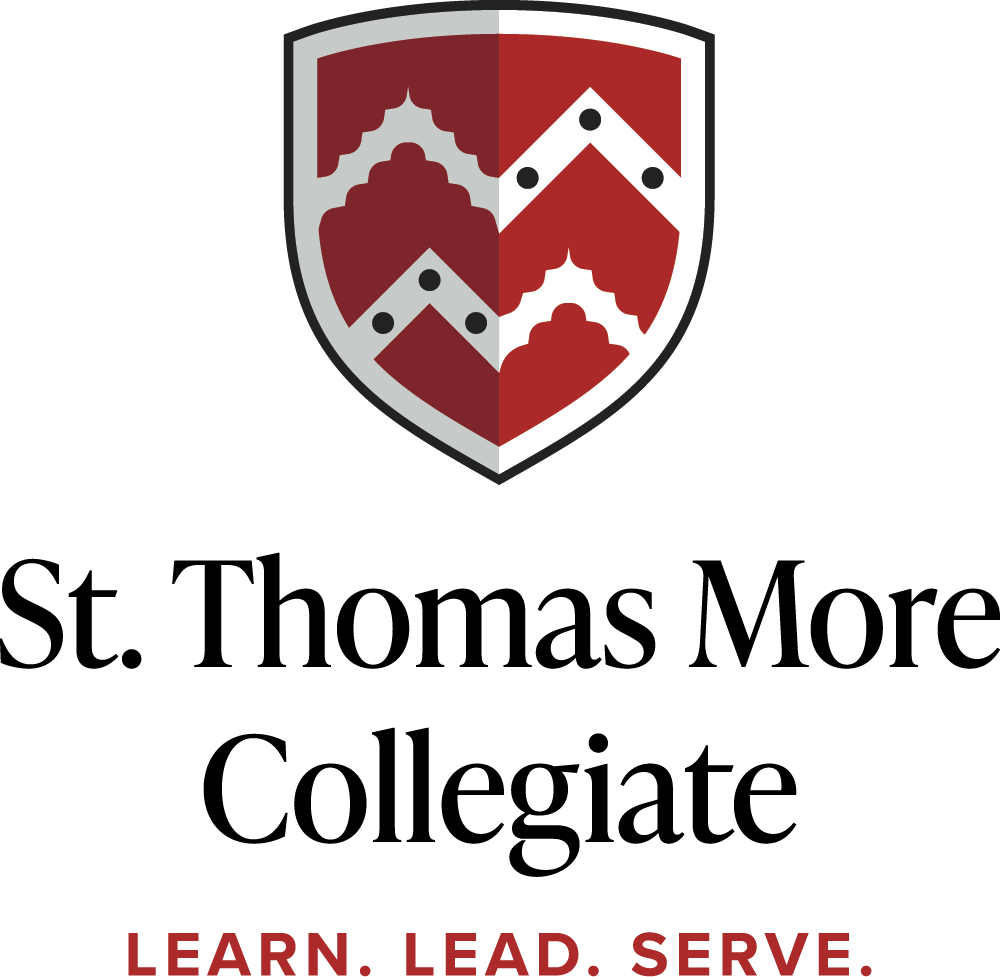
- STMC's new logo, beginning 2023

Location
- 7450 12th Avenue; Burnaby, British Columbia, V3N 2K1; Canada; 49.2153°N 122.9384°W

Information
- School type: Independent
- Motto: "Scientia per fidem" — Knowledge through faith
- Religious affiliation: Roman Catholic
- Founded: 1960
- School board: STMC Ltd. Board of Directors
- President: Mr. Stephen Garland
- Principal: Mr. Joe Adams
- Grades: 8–12
- Enrollment: 675
- Language: English
- Area: Edmonds, Burnaby
- Colours: Red, White, Black
- Team name: Knights
- Website: stthomasmorecollegiate.ca

St. Thomas More Collegiate, commonly abbreviated as STMC, or just STM, is an independent private school located in Burnaby, British Columbia, Canada.

The school is co-educational, offering academic, fine arts, and business programs, as well as athletic, performing arts, and other extracurricular programs, for students from grades 8 to 12.

The school participates in sporting events under the name of "Knights", with team colors of red, white and black.

== History ==
=== Beginnings (1957–1985) ===
In 1957, negotiations began between Most Rev. Martin Michael Johnson, Coadjutor Archbishop of Vancouver, and Rev. Brother A.A. Loftus, Provincial Superior of the Congregation of Christian Brothers in North America, to establish a Catholic high school in the Lower Mainland led by the Christian Brothers. By 1960, an agreement between the Christian Brothers and the Archdiocese of Vancouver was reached, and the construction of a 10-room school was completed.

St. Thomas More Collegiate opened its doors in September 1960, with a total of 110 students enrolled in grades 7, 8 and 9. Over the years, enrollment and staff increased. Major construction was carried out on school facilities in 1966, 1978, 1981, 1984, and 1985.

=== Reorganization (1985–2009) ===
Initially an all-boys school, St. Thomas More Collegiate transitioned to co-education in 1998. Around this time, criminal proceedings began against certain members of the Christian Brothers, some of whom were teaching at STMC. The proceedings were based on allegations of sexual and physical abuse against students at the Mount Cashel Orphanage in Newfoundland. The subsequent lawsuits by Mount Cashel victims threatened to close the school and nearby Vancouver College in 2002 in order to pay financial compensation. After the local community raised $19 million in 2003, the school was spared liquidation. Consequently, the school now operates under a charitable organization known as the STMC Foundation.

=== Principals ===
Date	Name
1960–1966	Brother W. G. McIntrye
1966–1969	Brother W. C. Martin
1969–1970	Brother D. Frenett
1970–1972	Brother R. L. Mackenzie
1972–1978	Brother C. H. Slattery
1978–1984	Brother Q. R. Carrothers
1984–1989	Brother K. E. Short
1989–1997	Brother H. J. O’Neill
1997–2000	Brother P. J. O’Loughlin
2000–2011	Mr. D. Hall
2011–2017	Mr. M. DesLauriers
2017–2022	Mr. S. Garland
2022–present	Mr. J. Adams

=== Presidents ===
Date	Name
2002–2006	Brother J. Gale
2006–2009	Brother D. Sanpietro
2015–2019	Mrs. N. Finnie
2019–2022	Ms. D. Doyle
2022–present	Mr. S. Garland

== Status ==
St. Thomas More Collegiate is classified as a Group 1 school under British Columbia's Independent School Act. It receives 50% of its funding from the Ministry of Education. The school receives no funding for capital costs. The school operates as a non-diocesan school within the Catholic Independent Schools of the Vancouver Archdiocese (CISVA), meaning the school has more independence regarding its policies, curriculum, and tuition fees.

== Performance ==
The St. Thomas More Collegiate curriculum is symbolized by the Knight's Compass, a Celtic cross with a core field of education at each of the four ends and the Catholic faith at the center of the cross.

=== Academics ===
St. Thomas More Collegiate is ranked by the Fraser Institute. In 2017, it was ranked 17th out of 253 schools in British Columbia. The school has consistently been ranked by the Fraser Institute in the top 10% of schools in British Columbia. In the 2017–18 school year, the graduation rate was over 99% and 85% of enrolled students continued on to post-secondary education.

=== Athletics ===
The sports teams in the STMC athletic program are known as the "Knights."

- (post 1975) Frank Gnup AAA Provincial Championships: Won 3 of 6 appearances

School Teams
Soccer
Volleyball
Track & Field
Basketball
Cross country running
Wrestling
Ultimate Frisbee
Lacrosse
Tennis
Golf
Curling
Swimming

== Clubs and groups ==
With more than 20 clubs, STMC offers a wide variety of clubs and extracurricular activities. STMC is mainly known for their football and basketball clubs, winning several rewards for both.

== Notable alumni ==
- A. J. Buckley - Actor best known for playing the part of Adam Ross on the hit crime drama CSI: NY.
- Kris Chucko - Professional hockey player for the NHL's Calgary Flames
- Jon Cornish - Canadian Football Hall of Famer with the CFL's Calgary Stampeders
- Tyson Craiggs - Former professional football player for the CFL's British Columbia Lions
- Anthony DesLauriers - Former professional football player for the CFL's Montreal Allouettes
- Curtis Hodgson - Professional lacrosse player for the New Westminster Salmonbellies and the Washington Stealth of the NLL.
- Brett Kelly - Actor best known for playing the part of Thurman Merman in Bad Santa.
- Adam Krajewski - Former professional football player for the Canadian Football League's Winnipeg Blue Bombers
- Calvin McCarty - Professional football player for the CFL's Edmonton Eskimos
- Peter Ogilvie - Retired Canadian sprinter who competed at the 1992 and 1996 Summer Olympics.
- Richard Stewart - Former British Columbia MLA and currently the Mayor of Coquitlam, British Columbia.
- David Sylvester - President and Vice Chancellor of St. Michael's College at the University of Toronto
- Kyle Turris - Professional hockey player for the NHL's Nashville Predators.
