= Brantford Redskins =

General information
- Founded: 1952; 74 years ago
- Folded: 1953; 73 years ago
- Headquartered: Brantford, Ontario

Personnel
- General manager: Ernie Churchouse
- Head coach: Frank Gnup

League / conference affiliations
- Ontario Rugby Football Union

Brantford Redskins was a Canadian football team in the Ontario Rugby Football Union. The Redskins were a farm team for the Montreal Alouettes. The team played in the 1952 and 1953 seasons. Their quarterback in 1952 was Al Dekdebrun, who had led the Toronto Argonauts to a Grey Cup win in 1950. The team folded in 1954, after they could not post a $5,000 bond and deal with player issues.

== Notable players ==
- Al Dekdebrun
- Ted Elsby
- Frank Gnup
- Tom Moran

== ORFU season-by-season ==
Season	W	L	T	PF	PA	Pts	Finish	Playoffs
1952	2	10	0	100	189	4	3rd, ORFU	-
1953	0	12	0	73	350	0	4th, ORFU	Last Place
