= Tyson Craiggs =

Canadian football player (born 1981)

No. 51
- Position: Linebacker

Personal information
- Born: August 8, 1981 (age 45); Kamloops, British Columbia, Canada
- Listed height: 6 ft 0 in (1.83 m)
- Listed weight: 220 lb (100 kg)

Career information
- College: Saskatchewan

Career history
- 2005–2006: BC Lions

Awards and highlights
- Grey Cup champion (2006)
- Stats at CFL.ca (archive)

Tyson Craiggs (born August 8, 1981) is a Canadian former professional football linebacker who played for the BC Lions, Montreal Allouettes and Hamilton Tiger Cats of the Canadian Football League (CFL).

== Early life ==
Craiggs father, Ted Craiggs, played for the BC Lions in 1976 and is a former special teams coach for the Lions and Football BC president. Tyson was born in Kamloops, British Columbia and played junior football for the Tri-City Bulldogs in 2001 as well as for St. Thomas More Collegiate.

He went to the University of Saskatchewan and played for the Saskatchewan Huskies football team. In 2002, he was third in the country in solo tackles (59) and played on the CIS Mitchell Bowl Championship Team, the Huskies went on to lose the Vanier Cup 33-22. In 2004, Craiggs had 38 kickoffs for 1909 yards and led the Huskies Defense in Tackles they went on to lose the lowest scoring Vanier Cup of all time 7-1 to the Laval Rouge et Or. He signed with the BC Lions in 2005 as a Free Agent. Eventually becoming the teams Special Teams Captain.

== Professional career ==
In 2005, the Lions signed Craiggs as a free agent. He made the team out of training camp as a Linebacker and was 6th on the team with 9 special teams tackles. In 2006, Craiggs had a career-high 18 total tackles finishing 3rd on the team in his 2nd year in the CFL.
