= Patricia Cladis =

Canadian physicist

- Born: July 13, 1937; Shanghai
- Died: July 3, 2017 (aged 79); Summit, New Jersey
- Education: University of British Columbia, B.A.; University of Toronto, M.A.; University of Rochester, PhD
- Awards: Edith Kreeger Wolf Distinguished Professor award; American Physical Society Fellowship; Guggenheim Fellowship; Humboldt Prize
- Scientific career
- Fields: Liquid crystals
- Institutions: Transport Canada; Bell Labs; Western Connecticut State University; University of Rochester; University of Paris (Orsay); Northwestern University; Ecole Pratique des Hautes Etudes; École Normale Supérieure; Weizmann Institute of Science; University of Duisburg-Essen; University of Bayreuth

Patricia Elisabeth Cladis (July 13, 1937 – July 3, 2017) was a Canadian-American physicist who specialized in the physics of liquid crystals. She was a research physicist at Bell Labs in Murray Hill, New Jersey from 1972 to 1997 before founding Advanced Liquid Crystal Technologies in Summit, New Jersey. She was a fellow of the American Physical Society and also received a Guggenheim fellowship.

== Early life ==
Cladis was born in Shanghai. She attended high school at Little Flower Academy in Vancouver, BC, graduating in 1955. In 1959, Cladis earned her B.A. in combined Honours Mathematics and Physics from the University of British Columbia. She then went on to acquire her M.A. in physics from the University of Toronto in 1960. She received her PhD in physics with a concentration in superconductivity from the University of Rochester in 1968.

== Career ==
After receiving her master's degree in 1960, Cladis joined Transport Canada, the governmental department of transport, as a meteorologist before moving on to be a programmer-analyst at KCS Ltd. in 1962. She was appointed a position at Western Connecticut State University as an assistant professor of physics in 1963. For the following four years until 1968 she worked as a research assistant at the University of Rochester while she did her graduate studies. She then moved to Paris for three years, conducting research at the University of Paris (Orsay) in her field of specialty, the physics of liquid crystals. During her time in Paris, she worked with the Orsay Liquid Crystal Group, whose founder, Professor Pierre-Gilles de Gennes, later went on to receive the Nobel Prize in 1991 for his work on liquid crystals and polymers. After her research position in Paris, she went on to work at Bell Labs in 1972 as a research physicist to continue her work in liquid crystals. After 25 years, she founded Advanced Liquid Crystal Technologies in 1997, a commercial physical and biological research company based in Summit, New Jersey.

She held visiting appointments at a number of institutions, including Northwestern University, where she was the recipient of the Edith Kreeger Wolf Distinguished Professor award, an endowment given by the Gender and Sexuality Studies department of Northwestern University to recognize women who have made major contributions to their fields. Other institutions include University of Paris (Orsay), Ecole Pratique des Hautes Etudes, École Normale Supérieure, Weizmann Institute of Science, University of Duisburg-Essen, and University of Bayreuth.

She was appointed a fellow of the American Physical Society in 1983, and later received the Guggenheim Fellowship in 1993. She also received the Humboldt Prize, an award which "recognizes lifetime achievements and facilitates international scientific collaboration." She was on the Editorial Board of Liquid Crystals from 1986-1993. She was a board member of the International Liquid Crystal Society.

== Research area ==
Cladis's concentration in her graduate studies was in the field of superconductivity. She specialized in the physics of liquid crystals, and her research has focused on liquid crystals throughout her entire career. She joined Bell Labs to continue her work on liquid crystals, researching "their material properties and processing." She was "well-known for her work on liquid crystal defects, her discovery of the reentrant nematic phase, and her work on phase transitions and pattern formation in liquid crystals." Her more recent interests were patterns in complex fluids, which includes polymers; she wrote a book in 1995 about patterns in complex systems. One example of the applications of liquid crystals is in LCD displays.

== Publications ==
She was the author or co-author of more than 130 publications and the editor for multiple books. The best-known book that she edited was published in 1995 entitled Spatio-temporal patterns in nonequilibrium complex systems.

== Later life ==
Cladis died on July 3, 2017, in Summit, New Jersey.
