= Jonathan Kongbo =

Zaire-born gridiron football player (born 1996)

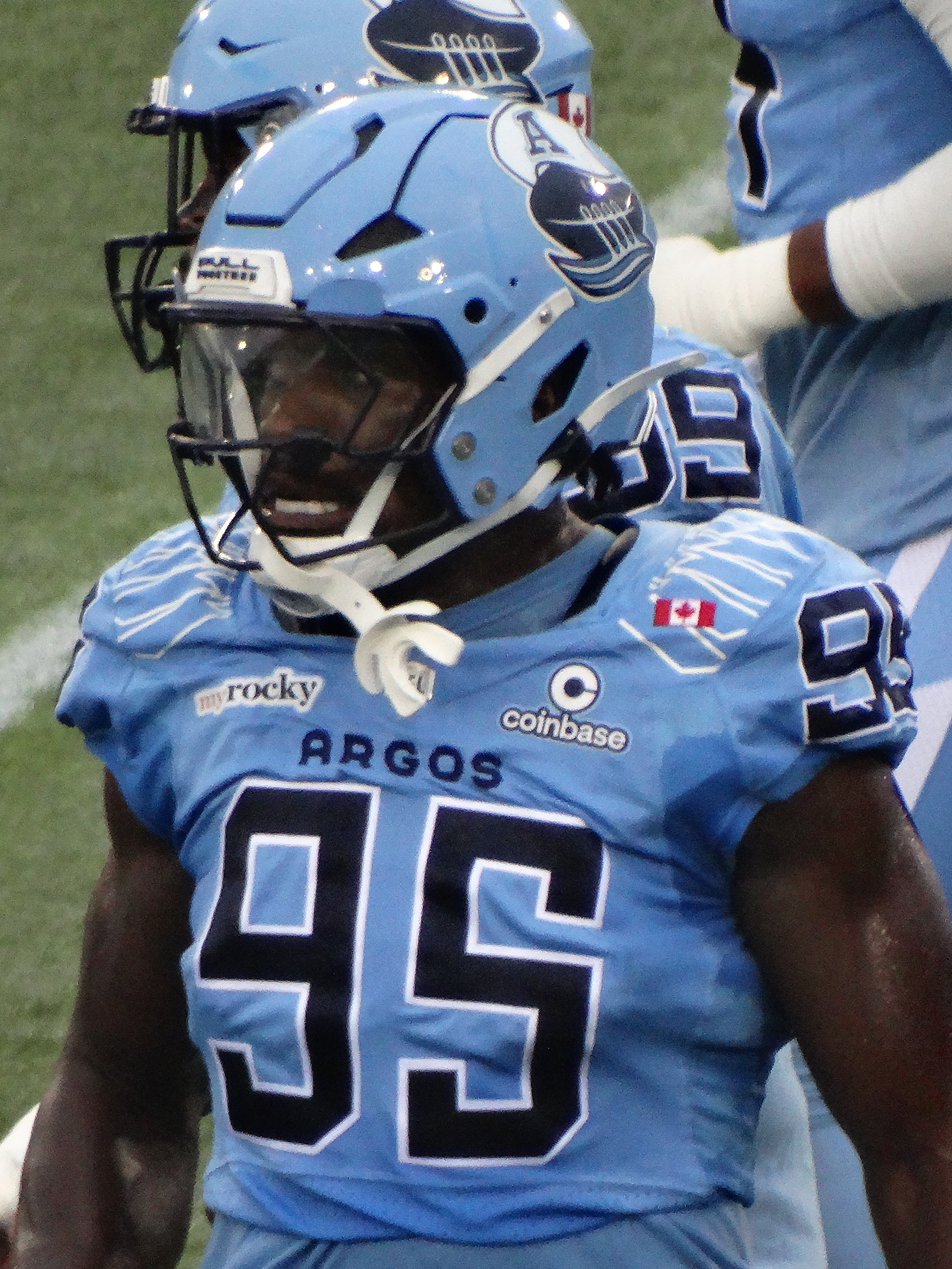
- Kongbo with the Toronto Argonauts in 2026

No. 95 – Toronto Argonauts
- Position: Defensive lineman
- Roster status: Active
- CFL status: National

Personal information
- Born: 19 March 1996 (age 30); Kinshasa, Zaire
- Listed height: 6 ft 4 in (1.93 m)
- Listed weight: 260 lb (118 kg)

Career information
- High school: Kitsilano / Holy Cross
- College: Wyoming (2014); Arizona Western (2015); Tennessee (2016–2018)
- NFL draft: 2019: undrafted
- CFL draft: 2019: 1st round, 5th overall pick

Career history
- Winnipeg Blue Bombers (2019); San Francisco 49ers (2020)*; Winnipeg Blue Bombers (2021); Denver Broncos (2022); BC Lions (2023)*; Hamilton Tiger-Cats (2023); Edmonton Elks (2025); Toronto Argonauts (2026–present)
- * Offseason or practice squad member only

Awards and highlights
- 2× Grey Cup champion (2019, 2021)
- Stats at Pro Football Reference
- Stats at CFL.ca

Jonathan Kongbo (born 19 March 1996) is a Congolese professional gridiron football defensive lineman for the Toronto Argonauts of the Canadian Football League (CFL). He was originally drafted by the Winnipeg Blue Bombers in the first round with the fifth overall pick in the 2019 CFL draft. He played college football at Arizona Western and Tennessee.

== College career ==
He was a three-sport athlete while attending Holy Cross Regional High School in Surrey, British Columbia, after transferring in grade 12 from Kitsilano Secondary. He accepted a scholarship to the University of Wyoming, where he was a redshirt in 2014 and did not play for the team. Kongbo then transferred to Arizona Western College, where he was a junior college All-American in 2015 and a high-profile college prospect. The following season in 2016, he played college football for Tennessee as a sophomore. His junior year was his best year, with ten games played and 29 total tackles. In 2018, his senior year, he moved into the linebacker role; after six games, he tore his anterior cruciate ligament (ACL) at the University of Tennessee against Auburn and did not play for the rest of the season.

== Professional career ==
Pre-draft measurables
Height	Weight	Arm length	Hand span	Wingspan	Bench press
6 ft 3 7/8 in (1.93 m)	256 lb (116 kg)	34 3/8 in (0.87 m)	9 3/4 in (0.25 m)	6 ft 9 in (2.06 m)	19 reps
All values from Pro Day

=== Winnipeg Blue Bombers (first stint) ===
Upon entering the CFL draft, Kongbo was at one point ranked the number-one prospect by the Central CFL Scouting Bureau and was eventually drafted fifth overall in the 2019 CFL draft by the Winnipeg Blue Bombers. He was signed by the Blue Bombers on 17 May 2019, and placed on their six-game injured list, hoping to play before the end of summer. He played in his first career professional game on 1 August 2019, against the Toronto Argonauts. In his first season, Kongbo played in 12 games, recording 12 tackles and a sack. He played in all three of the Blue Bombers' post-season games, including the 107th Grey Cup game where he won his first Grey Cup championship. Kongbo was released on 5 December 2019, as part of a pre-determined agreement to pursue National Football League opportunities.

=== San Francisco 49ers ===
On 1 January 2020, Kongbo signed a reserve/future contract with the San Francisco 49ers of the NFL. He was waived/injured on 27 August 2020, and subsequently reverted to the team's injured reserve list the next day. He was waived with an injury settlement on 4 September 2020.

=== Winnipeg Blue Bombers (second stint) ===
On 7 June 2021, it was announced that Kongbo had re-signed with the Winnipeg Blue Bombers to a one-year contract. Kongbo recorded 16 tackles on defense and one more on special teams, plus 3 sacks during the shortened 14 game regular season. Kongbo also had three more tackles and another sack in the playoffs, during which the Bombers won another Grey Cup. Kongbo was released to pursue NFL opportunities after the season concluded.

=== Denver Broncos ===
On 12 January 2022, Kongbo signed a reserve/future contract with the Denver Broncos of the NFL. He was waived on 30 August 2022, and signed to the practice squad the next day. He was promoted to the active roster on 6 October. He was waived on 11 October and re-signed to the practice squad. He was promoted back to the active roster on 31 December.

=== BC Lions ===
On 21 May 2023, it was announced that Kongbo had signed with his hometown BC Lions. He was competing with four other Canadians for snaps along the defensive line; Mathieu Betts, David Menard, Joshua Archibald and first-round 2023 CFL draft pick Francis Bemiy. There were rumours that Kongbo was not happy with his place in the depth chart and he claimed others on the team were not acting professionally. Others in the organization claimed that Kongbo quit on the team and was not a culture fit.

=== Hamilton Tiger-Cats ===
On 5 June 2023, Kongo was traded to the Hamilton Tiger-Cats in exchange for a fourth-round selection in the 2024 CFL draft. He played in all 18 regular season games where he had 15 defensive tackles and three special teams tackles. He was released in the following off-season on January 30, 2024.

=== Edmonton Elks ===
After sitting out the 2024 season, Kongbo signed with the Edmonton Elks on January 13, 2025. In 2025, he played in 16 games where he recorded six defensive tackles and four sacks. He became a free agent upon the expiry of his contract on February 10, 2026.

=== Toronto Argonauts ===
On February 10, 2026, it was announced that Kongbo had signed with the Toronto Argonauts.

== Personal life ==
Kongbo was born in Zaire (now known as the Democratic Republic of the Congo) to parents Joachim and Lily and has one brother, Joel. He moved to Canada when he was five years old.
