= Tom Moran (end) =

Canadian football player (1932–2013)

Profile
- Positions: End, Halfback

Personal information
- Born: August 16, 1932; Hamilton, Ontario, Canada
- Died: April 8, 2013 (aged 80); Houston, Texas, U.S.
- Listed height: 6 ft 1 in (1.85 m)
- Listed weight: 195 lb (88 kg)

Career history
- 1953–1961: Montreal Alouettes
- 1961: Hamilton Tiger Cats

Thomas Moran (August 16, 1932 – April 8, 2013) was a Canadian professional football player who played for the Montreal Alouettes and Hamilton Tiger Cats. He previously played for the Brantford Redskins of the Ontario Rugby Football Union. As of 2006, he lived in Houston, Texas. Moran died on April 8, 2013, at the age of 80.
