= St. Ann's Academy (Victoria, British Columbia) =

School in British Columbia, Canada

Coordinates: 48.4190°N 123.3636°W

St. Ann’s Academy
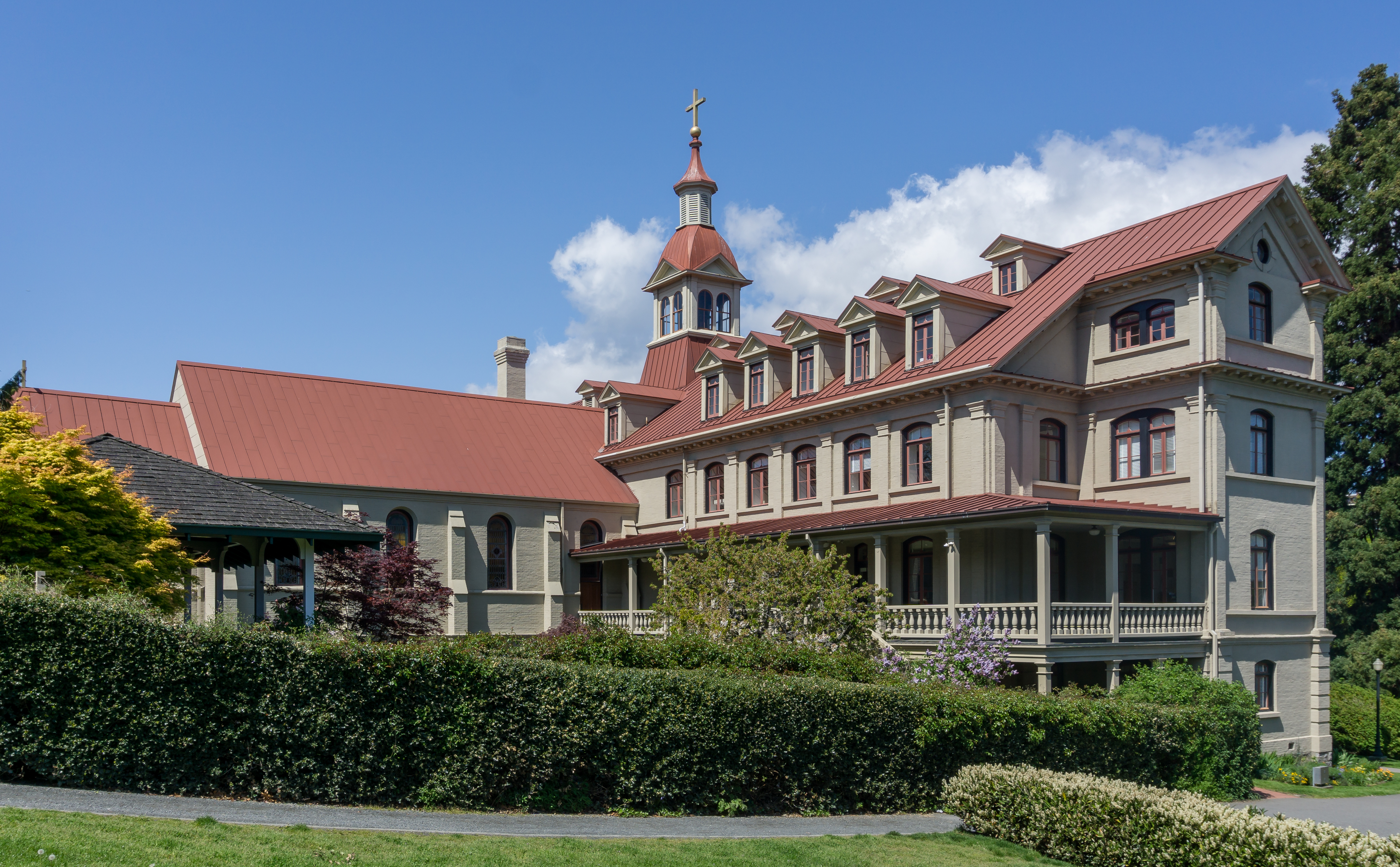
- Main building
- Interactive map of the St. Ann’s Academy area

General information
- Architectural style: French Canadian - Quebec Provincial
- Location: 835 Humboldt Street; Victoria, British Columbia; V8W 1B1, Canada
- Construction started: 1858 Chapel; 1871 School; 1886 & 1909 Convent
- Client: Sisters of Saint Ann

Design and construction
- Architects: Joseph Michaud, Charles Verheyden, John Teague, Thomas Hooper

National Historic Site of Canada
- Official name: St. Ann's Academy National Historic Site of Canada
- Designated: 1989

St. Ann's Academy, in Victoria, British Columbia, Canada, was a girls' Catholic boarding and day school from grades 1–12, and boys K–3, though boys stopped being admitted in the 1950s. First Nations orphans and girls were sent to the Academy from other missions run by the Sisters of St. Ann.

The main academy building, which also served as the Provincial House, convent and novitiate, was built by the Roman Catholic Congregation of Women the Sisters of Saint Anne of Lachine, Quebec. The chapel, designed by Father Joseph Michaud, was built in 1858 as St. Andrew's Cathedral was moved in 1886 to be St. Ann's Chapel and is the oldest part of the Academy. Later a convent was added (1887) to the west side of the Academy and behind the Academy (1910).

== History ==
The Sisters of St. Ann closed the Academy and in 1973 sold the property to the provincial government of British Columbia which used it as office space for the public service for a few years, but it was in need of major repairs and had to be closed. Years-long civic debate of diverse proposals for the future of the building and site ensued.

Placed under the stewardship of the Provincial Capital Commission, the interior of the building was gutted and rebuilt, basement to attic, providing seismic upgrade and rehabilitation into modern office space. Once completed, the majority of the building was leased to the BC Ministry of Advanced Education, a use consistent with the Sisters' aims. The exterior facade of his heritage building was retained and repaired. The chapel, parlours and infirmary were retained as an interpretive centre and restored to their 1920s decor. The auditorium at the other end of the building was also seismically upgraded and restored and is used for public lectures and concerts. The building was re-opened in 1997.

The chapel was deconsecrated when the Sisters sold the property. Since the restoration of the chapel and the adjacent Novitiate Garden, these have been used as a venue for weddings and other functions.

An annex behind the main building which had been occupied by the Victoria Conservatory of Music was demolished on September 11, 2001 following the Conservatory's move to the former Metropolitan United Church buildings. The site was cleared and became green space, merging the Academy grounds with the adjacent Beacon Hill Park.

== Plaques and signage ==
Andrew Petter, Minister Responsible for the Provincial Capital Commission, proposal to restore St. Ann's, at a cost of $16 million.

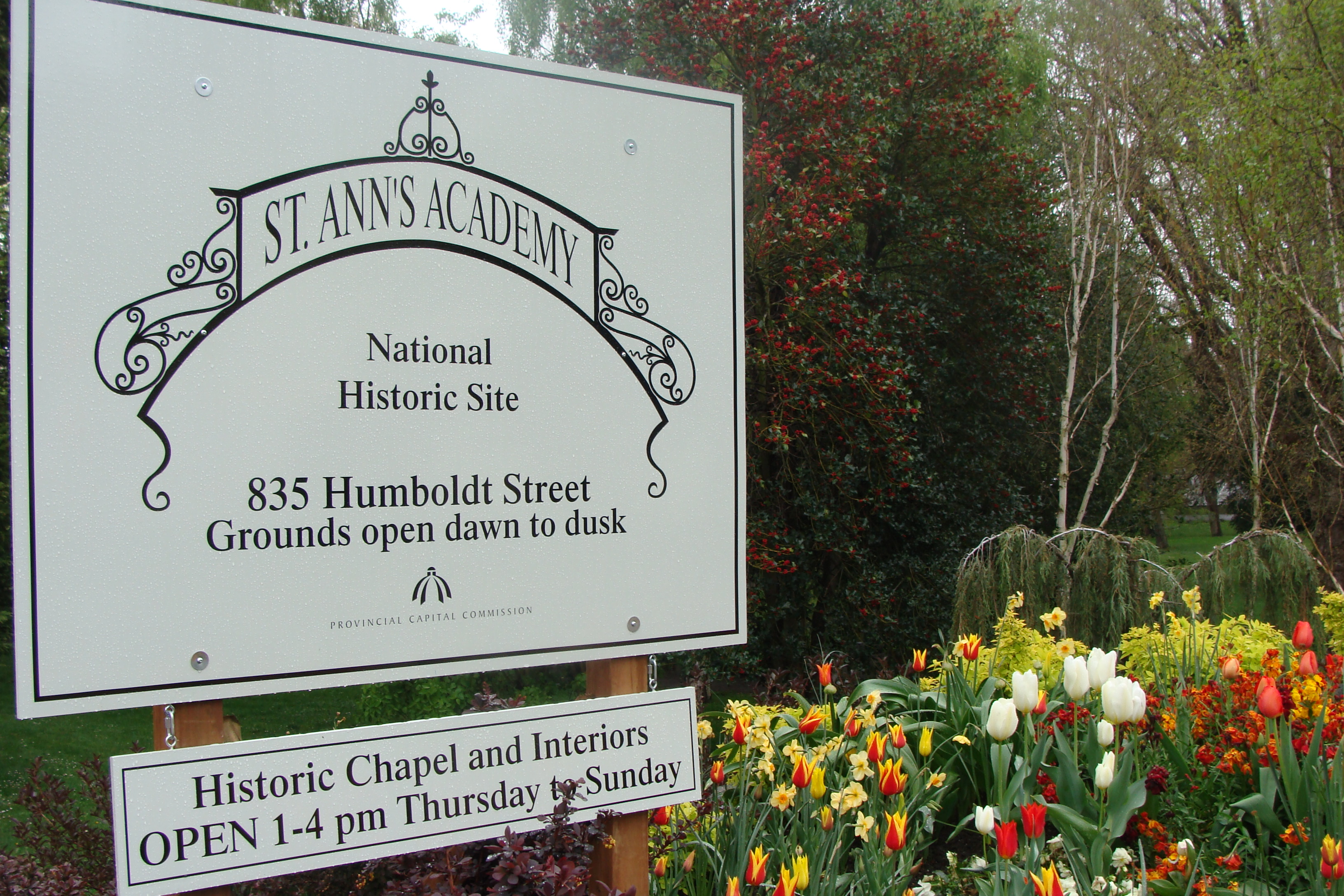
entrance signage

re-opening plaque

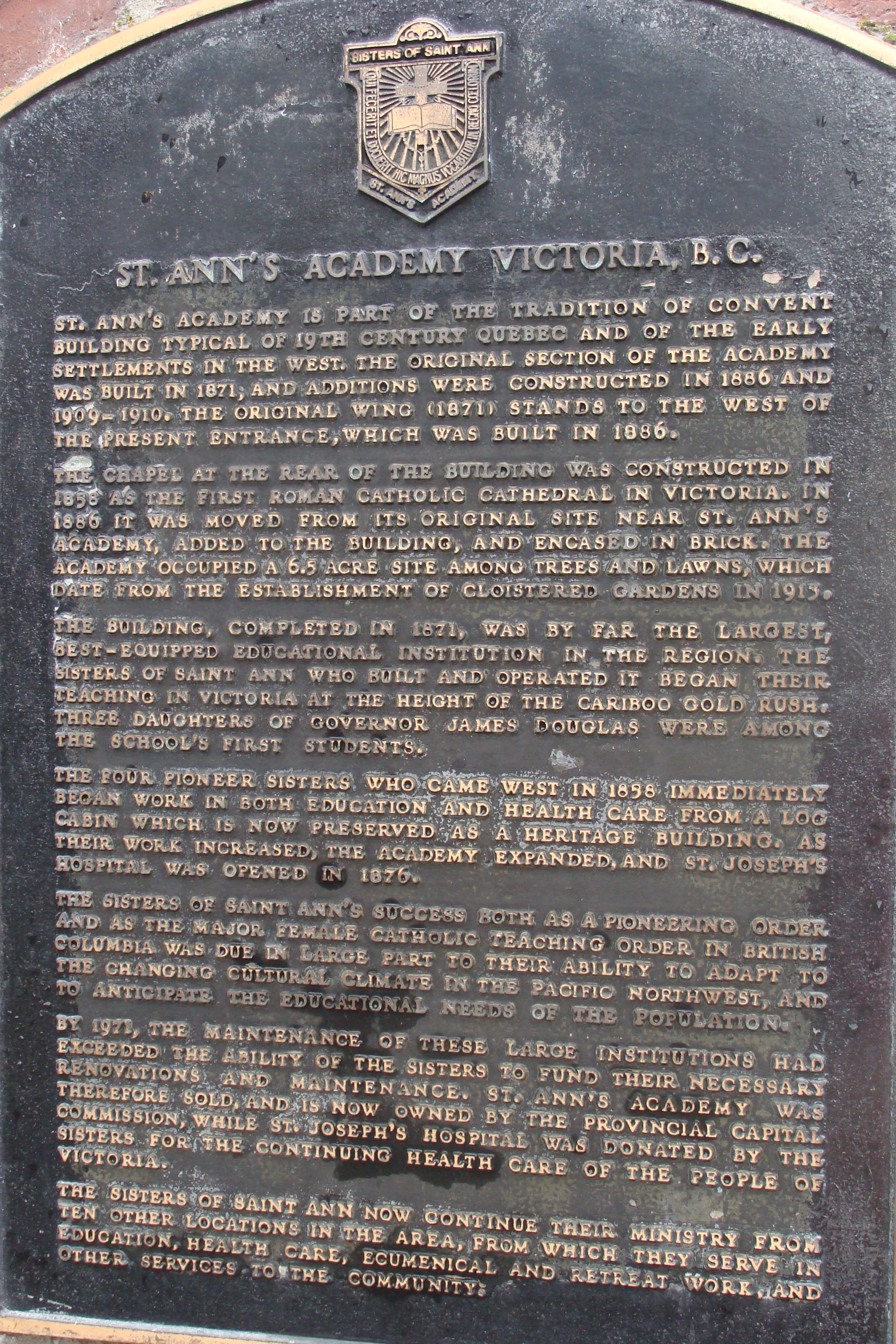
information plaque

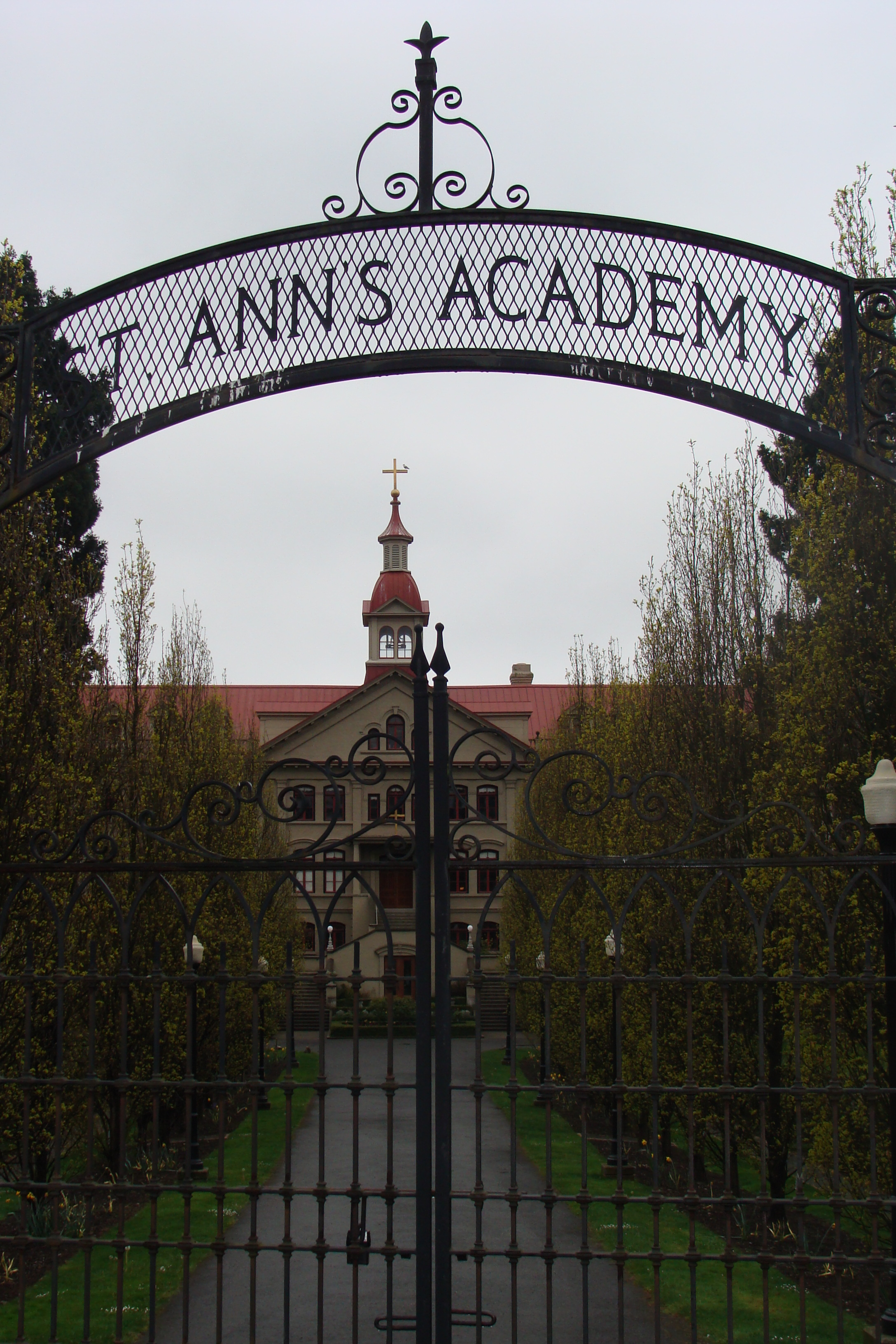
iron gate

== Architecture ==
The architecture of St. Ann’s Academy strongly resembles Victoria's Quebec Colonial style architecture.

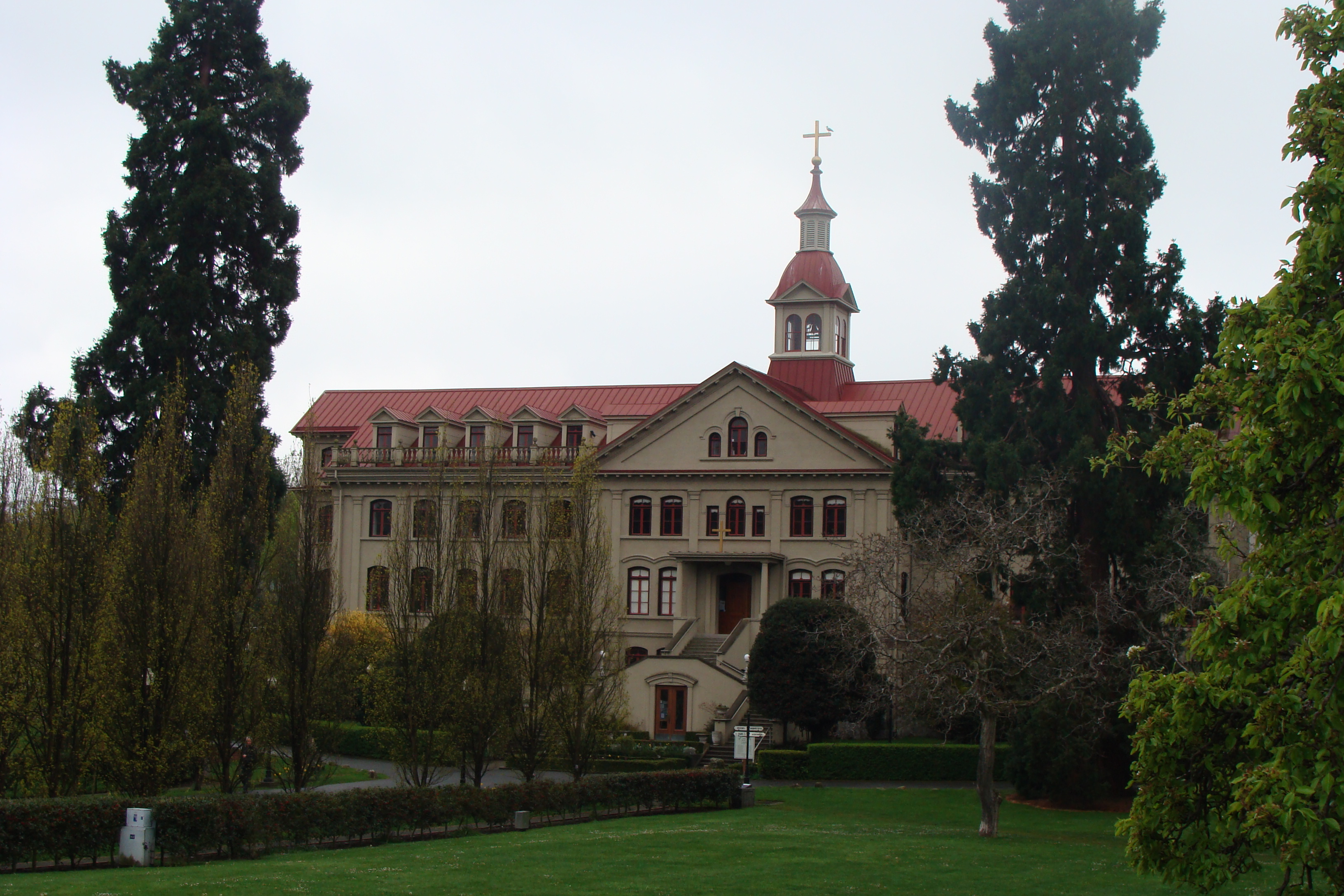
main building

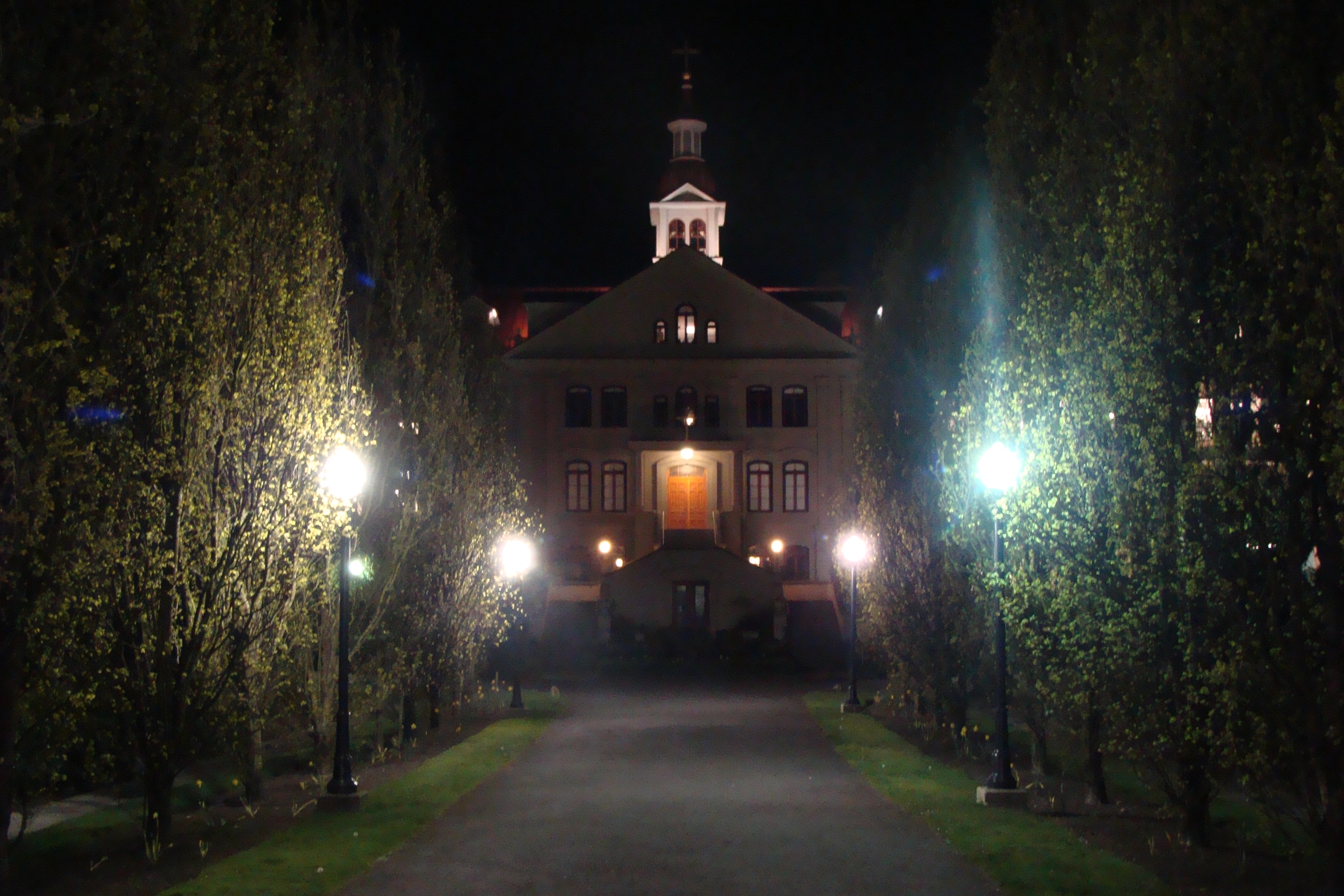
at night

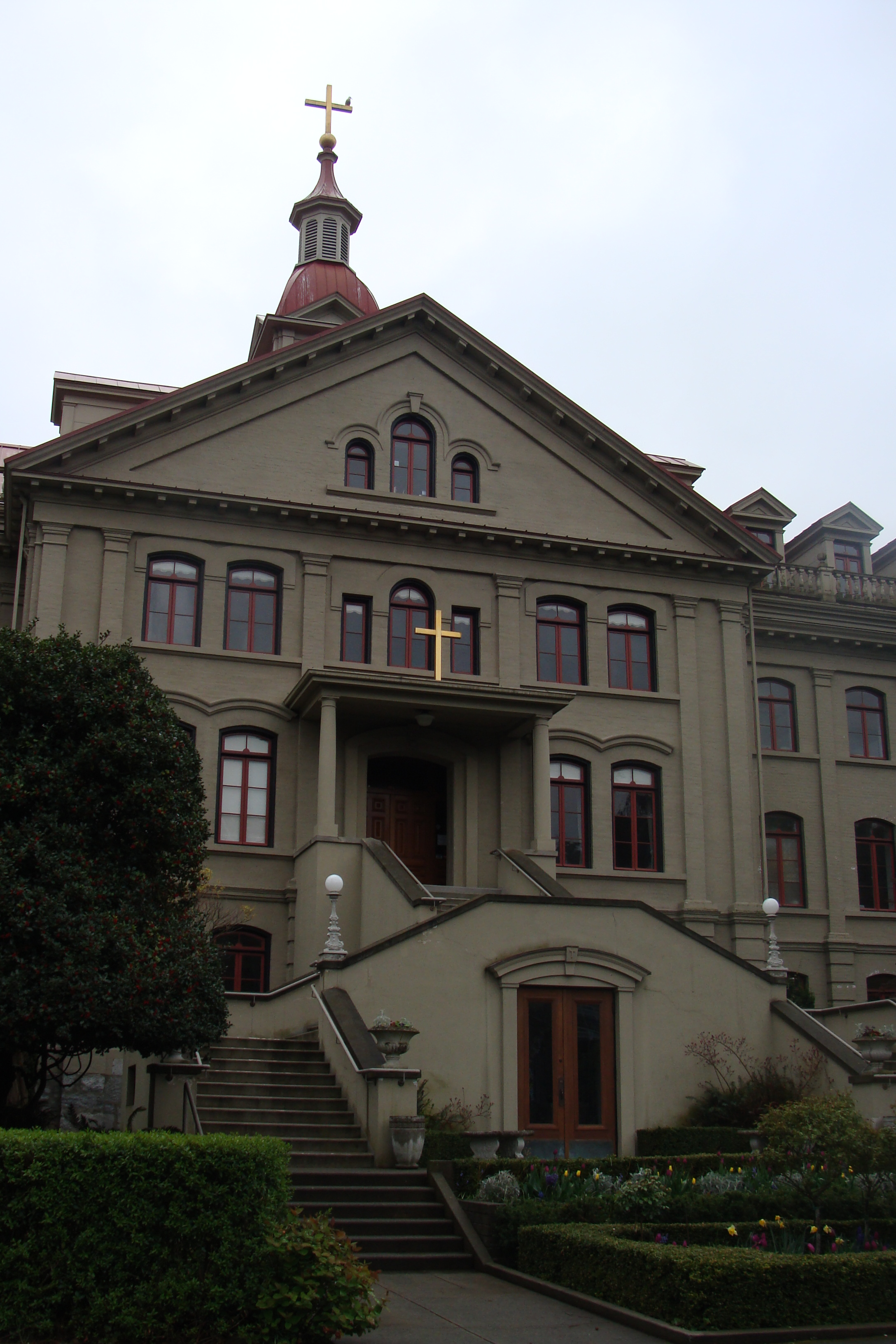
stairway entrance

noviate garden

west wing addition

west wing annex

main drive way

two styles

== Chapel ==
St. Ann's Chapel was the original St. Andrew's Cathedral of the city of Victoria. The chapel of St. Andrew’s was designed by Brother (later Father) Michaud of the Clerics of Saint Viator.

St. Ann's Chapel

the altar

Casavant Frères organ, opus 517, built for the chapel in 1914

stained glass window

Anne & Joachim teaching Mary; main art piece

main painting
close-up

Painting of the young Jesus in the temple, "Stupebant Omnes Qui Eum Audiebant"

Annunciation painting, "Ecce Ancilla Domini"

== Other art works ==
The Sisters of Saint Ann had two cemeteries at the Academy, where many of the first sisters were buried. In 1908, a plot in the northeast corner of Ross Bay Cemetery was opened for future burials. Upon the closure of the Academy in 1974, the first Sisters were exhumed and reinterred in the Sisters' plot in Ross Bay.

Many of the stained glass windows were vandalized during its time of abandonment, and had to be rebuilt during the reconstruction.

Sister Mary Osithe was the painter of 'The Immaculate Conception' painting that sits in the Sisters waiting room. Sister Mary Osithe was also the architect of Little Flower Academy school in Vancouver and St. Ann's Boys' School, Quamichan.

garden niche of Mary where the cemetery used to be.

rebuilt stained glass window door to the chapel.

'Immaculate Conception' by Sister Mary Osithe Labossière of the Academy.

== See also ==
- List of oldest buildings in Canada
- List of historic places in Victoria, British Columbia
- Roman Catholic Diocese of Victoria in Canada
- Little Flower Academy
- Sisters of Saint Ann
