= St. John Brebeuf Regional Secondary =

Location
- 2747 Townline Rd. Abbotsford, British Columbia, V2T 5E1; Canada; 49.0517°N 122.3622°W

Information
- School type: Independent
- Religious affiliation: Roman Catholic
- Founded: 1992
- School board: Catholic Independent Schools Vancouver Archdiocese
- Superintendent: Sandra Marshall
- Principal: Gianni Bittante
- Grades: 8-12
- Gender: Co-Ed
- Enrollment: 354 (2024/2025)
- Language: English
- Colours: Red, white, and black
- Team name: Bears
- Feeder schools: St Ann's Abbotsford, Sts. Joachim & Ann's Aldergrove, St. James Clearbrook, St. Joseph's Langley, St. Joseph's Mission, and St. Mary's Chilliwack.
- Website: www.stjohnbrebeuf.ca

St. John Brebeuf Regional Secondary is a Catholic school, under the administration of the Catholic Independent Schools Vancouver Archdiocese school board.

The school is co-educational, offering academic, fine arts, and business programs, as well as athletic, performing arts, and other extracurricular programs, for students from grades 8 to 12.

== History ==
Saint John Brebeuf Regional Secondary is the first Catholic high school in the central Fraser Valley. The school began with Grade 8 in a portable classroom in September 1992.

Feeder parishes are St Ann's Abbotsford, Sts. Joachim & Ann's Aldergrove, St. James Clearbrook, St. Joseph's Langley, St. Joseph's Mission, and St. Mary's Chilliwack.

== Independent school status ==
St. John Brebeuf Regional Secondary is classified as a Group 1 school under British Columbia's Independent School Act. It receives 50% funding from the Ministry of Education. The school receives no funding for capital costs. It is under charge of the Roman Catholic Archdiocese of Vancouver.

== Academic performance ==
In 2018, the Fraser Institute ranked St. John Brebeuf Regional Secondary as 236th out of 251 British Columbia high schools.

Academic Departments
Business
Mathematics
Performing Arts
Social Studies
Christian Education
English
Humanities
Information Technologies
Languages
Science
Physical Education
Visual Arts
Music

== Athletic performance ==
St. John Brebeuf fields teams in basketball, volleyball, golf, soccer, tennis, track and field, and cross country.

In the 2008–2009 school year, the senior boys soccer team won the Single "A" Provincials that the school hosted. That year, the girls soccer team finished third in the Single "A" Provincials at Nakusp.

The school also hosts The Big Bear Classic, an annual basketball tournament hosted for over twenty-three years each January that consists of teams throughout the Fraser Valley and Metro Vancouver regions. The well-attended tournament is part of the school's "spirit week" and usually also brings students from its elementary feeder schools to observe.

== Artistic performance ==
Fine Arts	Visual Arts
Drama	Art
Music

Music In the years 2007-2010 St John Brebeuf's Jazz Band led by Robert Woitowich, has won Gold status in the Kwantlen Jazz Festival.
