= Glen Jackson (Canadian football) =

Canadian football player (born 1954)

No. 37
- Position: Linebacker

Personal information
- Born: April 5, 1954 (age 72); Vancouver, British Columbia, Canada
- Listed height: 6 ft 3 in (1.91 m)
- Listed weight: 205 lb (93 kg)

Career information
- High school: Notre Dame (Vancouver)
- University: Simon Fraser
- CFL draft: 1976

Career history
- 1976–1987: BC Lions

Awards and highlights
- Grey Cup champion (1985); 6× CFL West All-Star (1977, 1978, 1979, 1982, 1985, 1987)

Glen Jackson (born April 5, 1954) is a Canadian former professional football linebacker for the BC Lions of the Canadian Football League (CFL).

== Amateur career ==
After playing at Notre Dame Regional Secondary School, he went on to play university football at Simon Fraser University.

== Professional career ==
Jackson played 12 years with the BC Lions, from 1976 to 1987, including 192 games, and two Grey Cups (1983 and 1985) and one championship (in 1985.) He was a Western All Star six times.

He selected to the Lions 50th anniversary All Time Team and is a member of the BC Lions Wall of Fame.

== Post-playing career ==
Retired from Holy Cross Regional High School in Surrey, British Columbia.
