= Victoria Conservatory of Music =

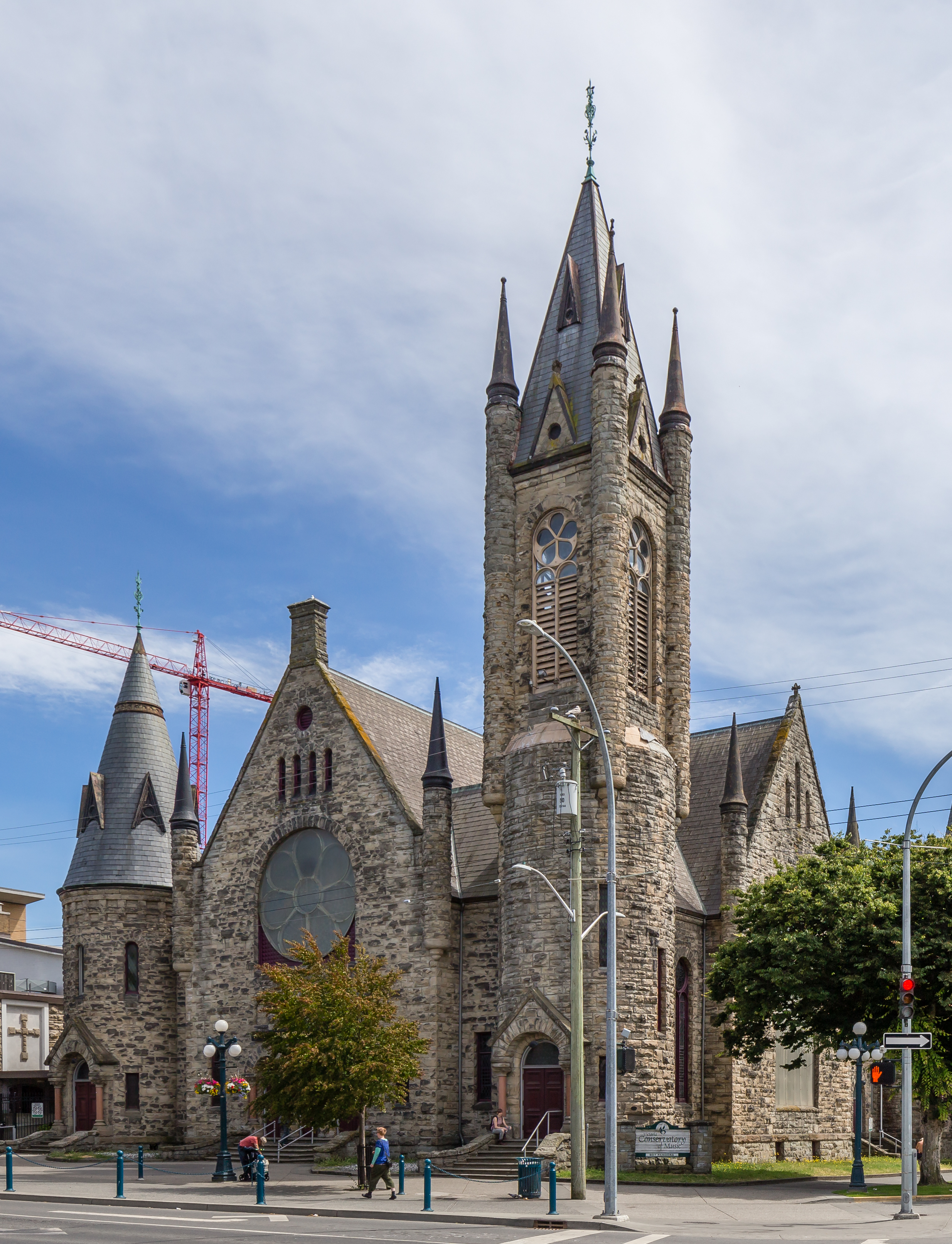
- Victoria Conservatory of Music Building

Location
- 900 Johnson Street; Victoria, British Columbia, V8V 3N4; Canada; 48.4269°N 123.3583°W

Information
- School type: Music school
- Dean: Tricia Baldwin
- Alumni: Hy Chanthavouth

Founded in 1964, the Victoria Conservatory of Music (VCM) is a music school in Victoria, British Columbia, Canada. The VCM offers education, performance and music therapy. As a music school for the community, the VCM accepts students of all ages and musical abilities, and teaches in all musical genres including classical, contemporary and music technology. Each year, over 4,500 students take part in an array of disciplines including woodwinds, brass, percussion, keyboard, strings, voice, jazz, theory and composition, and programs such as music therapy, teacher training, early children’s music programs and Summer Music Academies. In addition, the VCM offers a two-year performance-oriented post-secondary diploma program in partnership with Camosun College, credits from which are transferable to every major university in Canada. The VCM was once located at Craigdarroch Castle, and also spent time in a building on the grounds of St. Ann's Academy, but is now located at 900 Johnson Street, a building previously used as a church by the United Church of Canada. as well as a second location at 210 – 1314 Lakepoint Way, Langford. Cambodian musician Hy Chanthavouth studied at VCM. Stephen Green is VCM's dean.
