= Bill Cunningham (Canadian photographer) =

Canadian photographer

Bill Cunningham (1909–1993) was a Canadian photographer.

He was born in 1909 in British Columbia. In 1924 he graduated from Vancouver College. He was hired by the local Vancouver Sun in 1939, at the age of 31 years. In 1944, Cunningham joined another paper named the Vancouver Province. He worked for the Province for 27 years.

After he retired from the Province in 1973, he established a solo career until his death in 1993, at the age of 84. He is survived by five daughters and one son.

== Achievements ==
Cunningham's awards include the 1983 induction into the BC Sports Hall of Fame's W.A.C. Bennett Award and the UBC Big Block Club award.
