= Frank Gnup =

Canadian football player (1917–1976)

Profile
- Positions: Halfback & Quarterback

Personal information
- Born: April 5, 1917; Aliquippa, Pennsylvania
- Died: September 27, 1976 (aged 59); Vancouver, British Columbia

Career information
- College: Manhattan College

Career history

Playing
- 1946–49: Hamilton Wildcats
- 1950: Toronto Argonauts
- 1952: Brantford Redskins

Coaching
- 1955–73: UBC Thunderbirds

Awards and highlights
- Grey Cup champion (1950); Imperial Oil Trophy (1946); CFL All-Star (1946)

Frank Theodore Gnup (April 5, 1917 – September 27, 1976) was an American quarterback, halfback and coach who played Canadian football from 1946 to 1952.

A native of Aliquippa, Pennsylvania who was a star player at Manhattan College, Gnup took the Ontario Rugby Football Union by storm in 1946 as a player-coach, leading his Hamilton Wildcats to the league championship game, was named an all-star, and won the Imperial Oil Trophy as ORFU most valuable player. He played in Hamilton for 3 more seasons, but had a falling-out, and played the 1950 season with the Toronto Argonauts (6 regular season games.) He finished his playing days in 1952 with the Brantford Redskins of the ORFU.

After his playing days Gnup took up coaching in 1955 with the UBC Thunderbirds. His 18 years at the University of British Columbia are legendary, and in 1999 he was enshrined in the UBC Sports Hall of Fame. He has since been honoured by having the AAA Provincial Championships and the CWUAA Frank Gnup Memorial Trophy as Player of the Year named after him. The ever cigar chomping Gnup died of a heart attack September 27, 1976, aged 59.
