= Archbishop Carney Regional Secondary School =

Location
- 1335 Dominion Avenue; Port Coquitlam, British Columbia, V3B 8G7; Canada; 49.258404°N 122.747617°W

Information
- School type: Independent
- Motto: "Christ is the center of all endeavours"
- Founded: 1994
- School board: CISVA
- Superintendent: Doug Lauson
- Principal: Leonard De Julius
- Grades: 8-12
- Enrollment: 500+ Co-Ed
- Language: English
- Colours: Blue, Green, White
- Mascot: Star Fox
- Team name: Carney Stars
- Website: www.acrss.org

Archbishop Carney Regional Secondary School (ACRSS, commonly referred to as Carney) is a private independent secondary school in Port Coquitlam, British Columbia.

The school offers co-educational education for grades 8 to 12 offering a select amount of AP courses, a business program, elective options, as well as athletics, performing arts, and other extracurricular activities for students to choose from.

The school sports team can often be referred as the "Carney Stars"

== History ==
ACRSS was founded in 1994 by eight Roman Catholic parishes in the cities of Coquitlam, Port Coquitlam, Port Moody, Maple Ridge & Pitt Meadows. In its first year, the school operated from portable classrooms on the parking lot of Our Lady of Assumption Catholic elementary school in Port Coquitlam with only 87 students.

The school is under charge of the Roman Catholic Archdiocese of Vancouver and is the newest Roman Catholic high school in the Lower Mainland with just under 600 registered students for the fall semester of September 2021.

The first wing of the permanent school was opened in September, 1995. A second wing of classrooms, expanded gymnasium and multi-purpose room were added two years later. In 2011, construction went underway to add the next phase; a Fine Arts wing, which was completed the following year. Eventually the school plans to add an athletic Field House as well. The school is continuously growing, particularly in the areas of Fine Arts and Athletics. These facilities are needed to address these growing needs and provide an inspiring quality of education for Archbishop Carney's students. Approval from the Archdiocese of the field house is still required and will need the full support of the entire community in order to be achieved.

As of 2009, SMART boards have been incorporated into the classroom curriculum.

== Independent school status ==
Archbishop Carney is classified as a Group 1 school under British Columbia's Independent School Act. It receives 50 per cent funding from the Ministry of Education. The school receives no funding for capital costs. It is under charge of the Roman Catholic Archdiocese of Vancouver. Ultimately, this funding model means the school must rely on tuition and the fundraising events through its community.

Feeder Parishes	City
All Saints	Coquitlam
Our Lady of Assumption	Port Coquitlam
Our Lady of Fatima	Coquitlam
Our Lady of Lourdes	Coquitlam
St. Clare of Assisi	Coquitlam
St. Joseph's	Port Moody
St. Luke's	Maple Ridge
St. Patrick's	Maple Ridge

== Academic performance ==
Archbishop Carney is ranked by the Fraser Institute. In 2018–19, it was ranked 27 out of 251 Vancouver lower mainland schools.

== Student Life - Extracurricular Activities ==
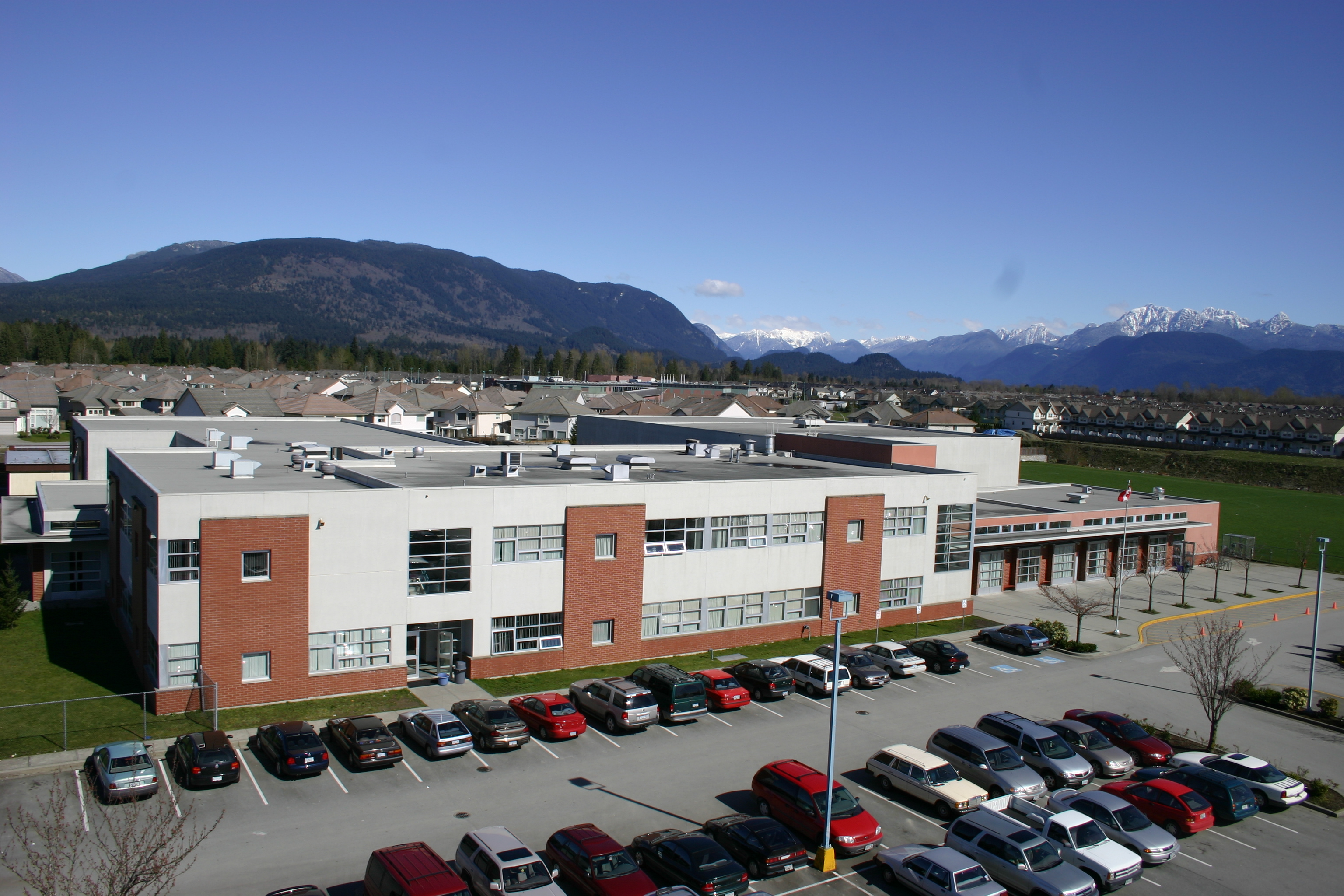
Aerial View of Archbishop Carney Secondary School

=== Student Council (Starliament) ===
The 1999 Constitution explains the purpose of this group:
Starliament has the responsibility to represent the interests of the student body of Archbishop Carney. They organize student activities, represents the student body to the community, promote school spirit, liaison with the staff, and promote the philosophy of the school. The leaders of Starliament are students, they are elected by their peers. (Leader - Prime Minister)

=== Clubs ===
There is a wide range of clubs to choose from. At the beginning of each year students have a chance to find what clubs they choose to join for that year.

=== The Tech Crew ===
The Tech Crew is responsible for the setup of the school's sound, lighting, and video equipment at events such as concerts, talent shows, and the monthly school masses.

=== Fine Arts ===
Archbishop Carney's music program holds large performances, including a Christmas Concert and a Spring Concert, and participation in the "Kiwanis Music Festival". In late February the Jazz Band I, Senior Concert Band and Senior Concert Choir will be traveling to Disneyland to participate in "Magic Music Days".In the year of 2011/12 this program entered a one-act play into METfest and won 2nd place. In the same year a student made one-act play was also entered into another competition and won first. Carney puts on one full play and one musical in alternating years.

Ensembles:

Vocal	Instrumental
Vocal Jazz	Jazz Band 1
Chamber Choir	Jazz Band 2
Junior Concert Choir	Beginner Concert Band
Senior Concert Choir	Junior Concert Band
Vocal Jazz	Senior Concert Band
Liturgy choir	Liturgy Band

=== Athletics ===
The school fields teams in the following sports:

- Basketball
- Soccer
- Swimming
- Volleyball
- Golf
- Mountain biking
- Tennis
- Track and field
- Cross country
