= Provincial Capital Commission =

The BC Provincial Capital Commission was a government-owned Crown Agency of the province of British Columbia, Canada. Its primary mandate was to "connect and celebrate the Capital with all British Columbians." The PCC owned several important heritage buildings and sensitive properties in the Capital Regional District. Revenues from these holdings funded numerous initiatives including festival and event support, province-wide educational programs and Capital for Kids, a travel funding program that brings school and youth groups to Victoria to learn about the democratic process and the rich history of the BC Capital City. The Commission was dissolved in 2014.

== Owned Sites ==
The PCC owned the following prominent Victoria landmarks:

- Crystal Garden
- St. Ann's Academy
- CPR Steamship Terminal
- Inner Harbour

Also properties at 613 Pandora Street and the Stores Building as well as numerous parks and greenspaces within the Capital Region.

The Provincial Capital Commission sponsors a number of festivals and events each year in the provincial Capital, including BC Day, Canada Day, Victoria Dragon Boat Festival, Buskers Festival, Fringe Theatre, Ska, Swiftsure International Yacht Race, Classic Boat Festival, National Aboriginal Day/First Peoples Festival and more.

The PCC also produced one of the largest events ever held in Victoria's Inner Harbour to celebrate the 150th anniversary of the founding of British Columbia. Festival 150 drew more than 50,000 people into the harbour area to watch Burton Cummings, Sarah McLachlan, Feist, Colin James and other performers on a stage in front of the Parliament Buildings. The Sunday, August 3, 2008 celebration was opened by BC Premier Gordon Campbell and Canadian Prime Minister Stephen Harper.
