= Catholic Independent Schools Vancouver Archdiocese =

Educational organization

The Catholic Independent Schools of the Vancouver Archdiocese (CISVA) is a network of 46 Catholic schools serving students from Kindergarten to Grade 12 across the Greater Vancouver area and surrounding regions, including Powell River and Chilliwack.

CISVA operates 40 elementary schools (Grades K-7) and 6 secondary schools (Grades 8-12). All CISVA schools deliver the provincial curriculum set by the BC Ministry of Education within a faith-based context. Schools are parish-based community schools or regional schools jointly operated by several parishes.

== Secondary Schools ==
- Archbishop Carney Regional Secondary School
- Holy Cross Regional High School
- Notre Dame Regional Secondary School
- St. John Brebeuf Regional Secondary
- St. Patrick Regional Secondary School
- St. Thomas Aquinas Catholic High School

== Elementary Schools ==
- Assumption School (Powell River)
- Blessed Sacrament
- Cloverdale Catholic
- Corpus Christi
- Holy Cross
- Holy Trinity
- Immaculate Conception (Delta)
- Immaculate Conception (Vancouver)
- Our Lady of Fatima
- Our Lady of Good Counsel
- Our Lady of Mercy
- Our Lady of Perpetual Help
- Our Lady of Sorrows
- Our Lady of the Assumption
- Queen of All Saints
- Sacred Heart
- St. Andrew's
- St. Anthony of Padua (Vancouver)
- St. Anthony's (West Vancouver)
- St. Augustine's
- St. Bernadette's
- St. Catherine's
- St. Edmund's
- St. Francis de Sales
- St. Francis of Assisi
- St. Francis Xavier
- St. Helen's
- St. James
- St. Joseph's
- St. Joseph the Worker
- St. Jude's
- St. Mary's (Chilliwack)
- St. Mary's (Vancouver)
- St. Matthew's
- St. Michael's
- St. Patrick's (Maple Ridge)
- St. Patrick's (Vancouver)
- St. Paul's
- St. Pius X
- Star of the Sea

== See also ==
- School District 39 Vancouver
