= John Malinosky =

Canadian gridiron football player (born 1955)

Profile
- Position: Offensive tackle

Personal information
- Born: May 8, 1955 (age 71); Vancouver, British Columbia, Canada

Career information
- High school: Killarney Secondary School / Notre Dame Regional Secondary School
- College: Michigan State University

Career history
- 1978: Calgary Stampeders
- 1979: Winnipeg Blue Bombers
- 1980–1984: Toronto Argonauts
- 1985–1987: Hamilton Tiger-Cats

Awards and highlights
- 2× Grey Cup champion (1983, 1986)

John Malinosky (born May 8, 1955) is a Canadian former professional football offensive lineman who played ten seasons in the Canadian Football League (CFL) for four teams.

== High school and college years ==
After playing first at Killarney Secondary School John completed his high school ball at Notre Dame Regional Secondary School, both located in East Vancouver. He played college football at the Michigan State University.

== Professional career ==
Malinosky was traded from the Winnipeg Blue Bombers to the Toronto Argonauts in 1980 as part of a 6-man deal.
