= Holy Cross Regional High School =

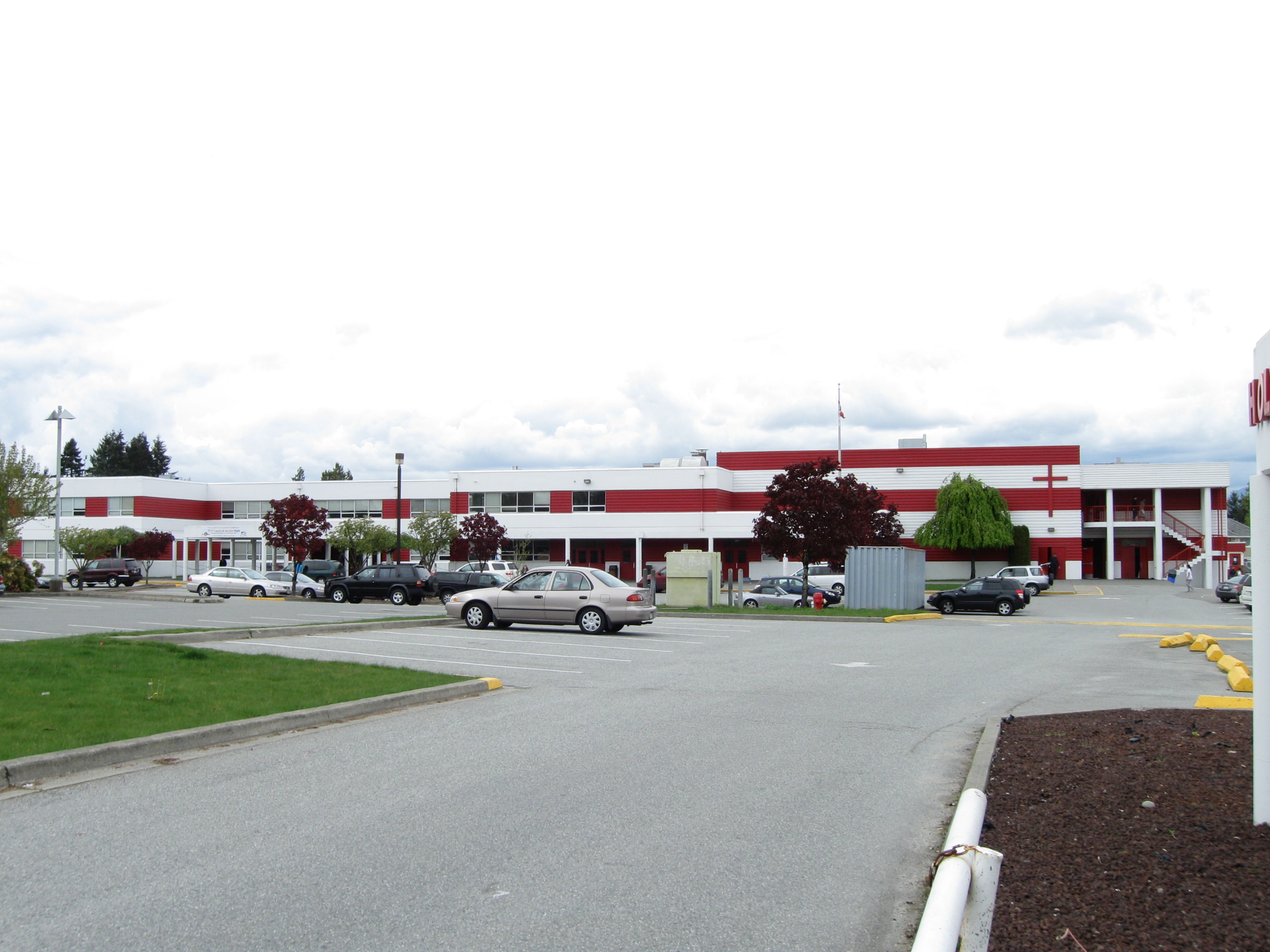

Location
- 16193 88th Ave; Surrey, British Columbia, V4N 1G3; Canada; 49°9′50″N 122°46′30.9″W

Information
- School type: Independent high school
- Motto: In Hoc Signo Vinces (With this sign, we shall conquer)
- Religious affiliation: Roman Catholic
- Founded: 1982
- School board: Catholic Independent Schools of Vancouver
- Superintendent: Henk Luyten
- Area trustee: Fr. Tien Tran (Archbishop's Representative)
- Principal: Chris Blesch
- Staff: 80
- Grades: 8–12
- Enrollment: 800+ (September 2022)
- Language: English
- Area: Surrey
- Colours: Red and Silver
- Mascot: Crusader
- Team name: Holy Cross Crusaders
- Website: www.holycross.bc.ca

Holy Cross Regional High School, or "HCRHS", is a Catholic school, under the administration of CISVA (Catholic Independent Schools of the Vancouver Archdiocese) school board located in Surrey, British Columbia, Canada. Holy Cross is the largest Catholic high school in the province with enrollment of students in grades 8 through 12 exceeding over 800 students, (as of 2023).

== Independent school status ==
Holy Cross Regional High School is classified as a Group 1 school under British Columbia's Independent School Act. It receives 50% funding from the Ministry of Education. The school receives religious donations. It is under charge of the Roman Catholic Archdiocese of Vancouver.

== Departments ==
=== Academics ===
Holy Cross was ranked by the Fraser Institute in 2019 as 72 out of 252 British Columbian Secondary Schools, with an overall rating of 6.8 and a graduation rate of 100%.

The academic departments are Business Education, Drama, English, Food, Information Communication Technology, Languages, Math, Music, Physical Education, Religion, Sciences, Social Studies, and Visual Arts.

=== Athletics ===
Athletic programs offered in Holy Cross include Basketball, Volleyball, Track and Field, Soccer, Cross Country, Swimming, Golf, Football, Tennis, Cheerleading, Ultimate Frisbee, and Dance Squad.

Sports events are held at Holy Cross like the BC Catholic Basketball Championship, rated the BC's best sporting atmosphere, which features rivalries between all BC Catholic high schools. All sport teams play in the AA classification except the boys basketball program who play at the AAAA classification. The basketball program is consistently ranked in the top 10 in both boys and girls and has placed provincially countless times in volleyball, track and field, basketball, football and swimming. Holy Cross has won 3 provincial titles in basketball and football and over 20 Fraser Valley Regional Championships in many sports. Holy Cross Athletic have had countless athletes receive post secondary athletic scholarships as well as go on to play professionally.

The Holy Cross Athletics program has over 400 student-athletes participating on various teams throughout the year. There is an Athletics Media Leadership Team that runs events, social media accounts, clothing line designing, pep rallies, dances and photography/videography for our teams. The AML Team is student led and provides student leadership opportunities to over 30 members.

Holy Cross's facilities include a full-sized wood floor gymnasium, a track oval, weight room, a football and soccer field, and a new building featuring a double gymnasium.

=== Music ===
Holy Cross has the largest music program out of all schools within the CISVA, with over 300 students, spanning over many different types of ensembles. The school includes three concert bands (Senior Wind Ensemble, Junior Wind Ensemble, and Grade 8 Concert Band) as well as two choral ensembles (Senior Concert Choir: ViBE and Junior Concert Choir: Tonic!). The Holy Cross Music Program also has a strong jazz program in the school featuring 3 jazz bands (Jazz One (senior level), Simply Jazz (junior level), and Jazz-Do-It (grade 8 level)) and two jazz choirs (Avenue 88 (senior level) and 160th Street (junior level)). Holy Cross music also has many small combos (mainly jazz) at every grade level, that are student led and perform for many live events and local recitals. Holy Cross also has a drumline which performs during pep rallies and sports game days (football and basketball) as well as a percussion ensemble which plays arranges of various composers for percussion. The music program also has a small strings ensemble which features students playing violin, viola, cello, and string bass. The ensemble accompanies the liturgical choir during school masses, and performs during school concerts and recitals.

All music ensembles compete in local music festivals such as the Kiwanis Music Festival, Cantando Music Festival, and Surrey (Envision) Jazz Festival. The music program also tries to have to music trips each year, allowing all music students to experience competing in a music festival away from home, across all grade levels. Along with theses ensembles, all students are required to participate in our liturgical choir in which they sing for our monthly masses taking place in the neighbouring church St. Matthew's. For those interested in music composition and production, Holy Cross also offers a music composition and production course offered to students in grade 11 and 12.

With such a large music program, Holy Cross has a Music Student Leadership Team, also known as MSL, to help run and coordinate all the events and social aspects of the music program. MSL is one of the first leadership teams to appear in a music program and was formed in September 2013. Now leadership teams in music programs have become more common in many high schools with music programs.

=== Advanced Placement ===
Holy Cross offers only one Advanced Placement course, the full-year AP Physics 11 & 12.

== Religious education ==
Holy Cross provides mandatory religious education. The course curriculum is organized by the Roman Catholic Archdiocese of Vancouver.

== Current plans ==
Work is underway to replace the original 1982 school building in its entirety. Phase one of construction was finished with near the end of the school year in 2025. The entire new building projected to take 10 to 15 years to complete, involves the outright replacement of the existing school with another new building.

The phase one involved building a larger gymnasium, two music rooms, a flex space multipurpose room, seven new classrooms, and an overall updated building.

== Notable faculty ==
- Glen Jackson – former BC Lions linebacker who taught social studies, business education, and athletics.

== Notable alumni ==
- Jean-Luc Bilodeau Actor
- Elise Estrada – Singer
- Emmalyn Estrada – Singer
- Dario Zanatta – Soccer player
- Jonathan Kongbo – 2019 Grey Cup Champion for the Winnipeg Blue Bombers and former 2019 CFL first-round pick
- Zach Verhoven – Soccer midfielder for Atlético Ottawa of the Canadian Premier League
