= Ted Elsby =

Canadian football player

Profile
- Position: Tackle

Personal information
- Born: January 3, 1932; Galt, Ontario, Canada
- Died: November 5, 1985 (aged 53); Montreal, Quebec, Canada
- Listed height: 6 ft 0 in (1.83 m)
- Listed weight: 235 lb (107 kg)

Career history
- 1953–1965: Montreal Alouettes

Awards and highlights
- CFL East All-Star (1964)

Ted Elsby (January 3, 1932 – November 5, 1985) was a Canadian professional football player who played professionally for the Montreal Alouettes.
