= Little Flower Academy =

Independent Catholic secondary school in Vancouver, British Columbia, Canada

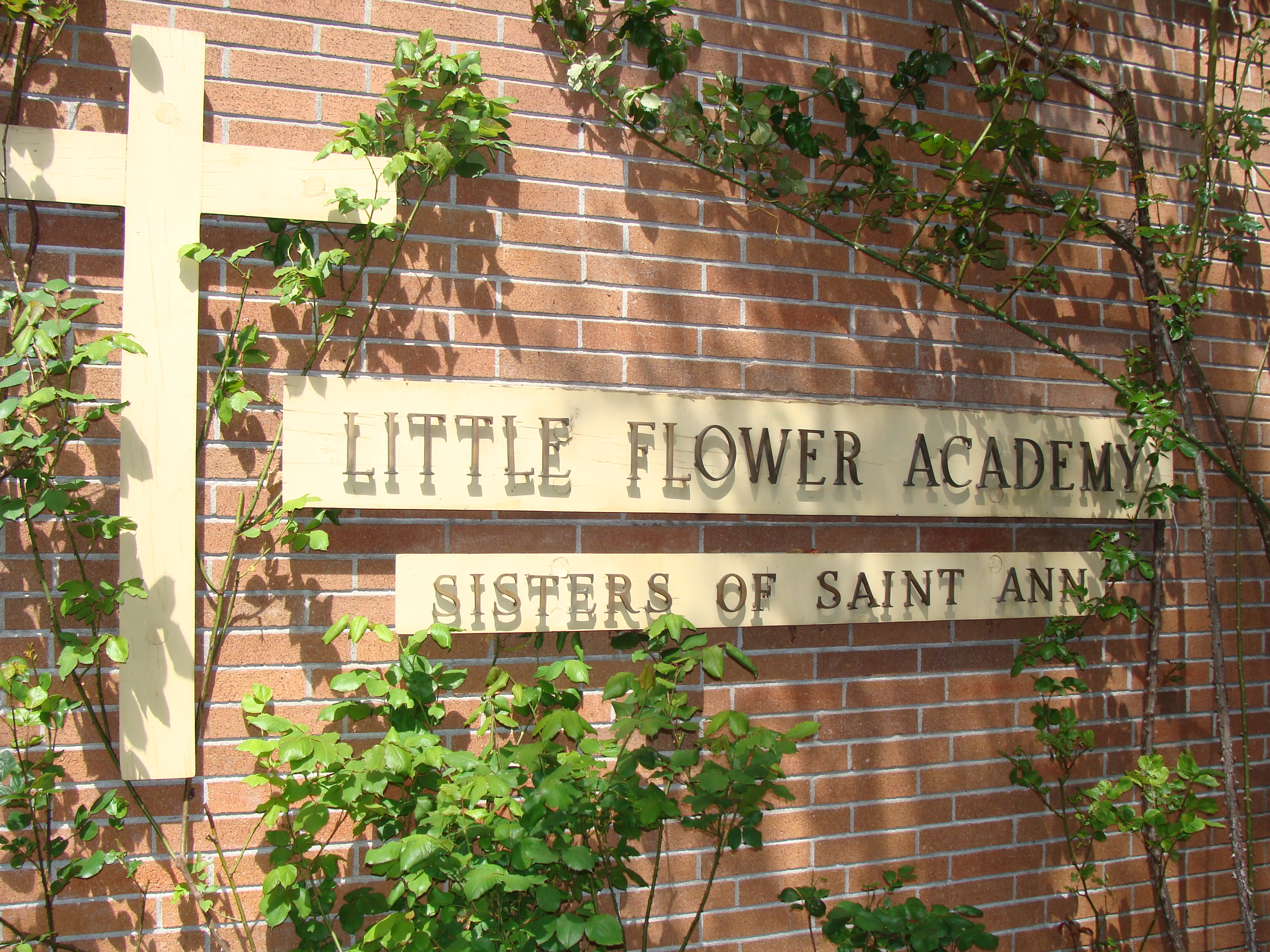

Location
- 4195 Alexandra Street; Vancouver, British Columbia, V6J 4C6; Canada; 49.2483°N 123.1422°W

Information
- School type: Independent Catholic Secondary school
- Motto: "Ad Lucem" (To The Light)
- Religious affiliation: Roman Catholic Archdiocese of Vancouver
- Founded: 1927
- Sister school: Vancouver College
- School board: CISVA (Catholic Independent Schools of the Vancouver Archdiocese)
- Principal: Mrs. Diane Little
- Grades: 8-12
- Gender: Girls
- Enrollment: 481 (2013~2014)
- Language: English
- Area: Shaughnessy
- Colours: Maroon and White (maroon, grey or white for sports)
- Mascot: Angel
- Team name: Angels
- Website: www.lfabc.org

Little Flower Academy (LFA) is a Canadian independent all girls Catholic secondary school located in Vancouver’s Shaughnessy neighbourhood established in 1927, by the Sisters of Saint Ann.

== History ==
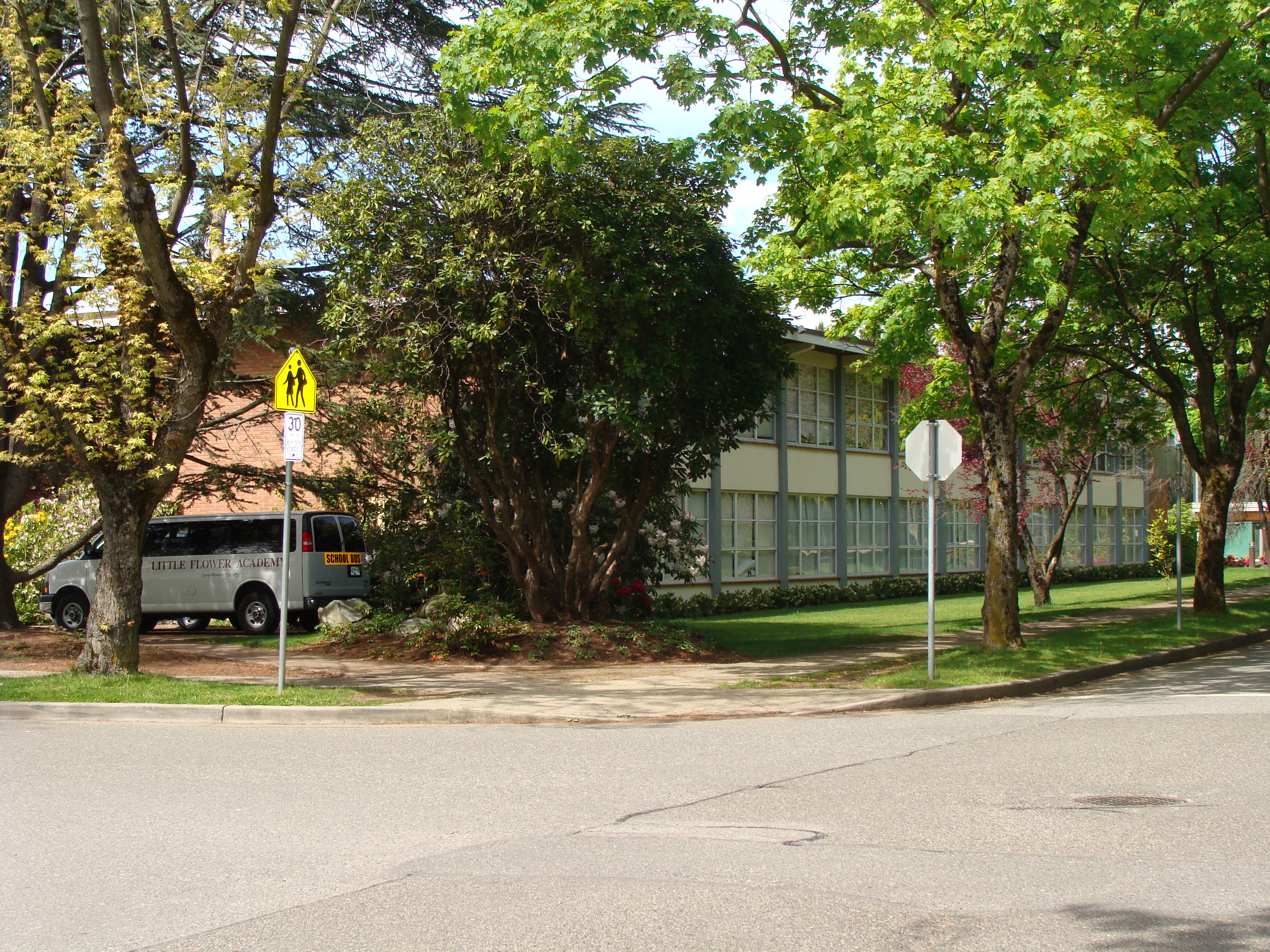
Old section of the school

In 1858, five women of the Québec-based order of the Sisters of St. Ann travelled by sea to the Isthmus of Panama and up the west coast to Victoria. They set down in a small log cabin in Beacon Hill Park, and began the process of establishing Victoria's St. Ann's Academy.

The Sisters' first presence in Vancouver came in 1888 (two years after the city was established) with a school on Dunsmuir, next to a cathedral and, according to an article researched by the late Sister Eileen Kelly (the last St. Ann order principal of LFA), "on the edge of a forest clearing."

The Sisters wanted to expand with a boarding school to accommodate young women who lived too remotely to access existing educational facilities. The building (now replaced) known as "The Convent" was built in Shaughnessy in 1910 for this purpose. By 1918, the Vancouver diocese sold 6 acres (24,000 m^{2}) to the municipality of Point Grey, who desired a portion of the site to erect their own public school, Prince of Wales High School – which became today's Shaughnessy Elementary in 1961. The ownership of the remaining property at the time reverted to the Sisters of Saint Ann, who were able to meet the payments and whose chosen school name "Little Flower Academy" began appearing in the published Vancouver Directory books.

According to tradition, Little Flower Academy was so named apparently because the prayers of one of the Sisters had been answered in acquiring the property. The prayers had been made to Saint Thérèse de Lisieux, who had the nickname "The Little Flower of Jesus."

== Academics ==
The school offers a university preparatory program for girls in grades 8 through 12. In 2016 Little Flower Academy ranked as the number one Secondary Schools in the province of British Columbia (2019), and has a top three standing in the Fraser Institute provincial rankings.

== Athletics ==
There are two gymnasiums, the larger accommodates more than five hundred spectators and hosts volleyball, basketball and badminton tournaments. There is also a fitness centre, tennis courts and playing fields.

The LFA Angels (sports teams) have an angel for a mascot, although there is no official physical mascot. LFA is, simply, the "Home of the Angels."

The School's athletic teams include:

- Fall Season Sports: Cross-Country Running, Field Hockey, Swimming and Volleyball
- Winter Season Sports: Basketball and Ice Hockey (new in 2022/2023)
- Spring Season Sports: Badminton, Soccer, Tennis, Track & Field, and Ultimate Frisbee

=== Provincial championships ===
- Badminton: 2022 and 2023
- Track & Field': 2013
- Volleyball: 2012, 2016 and 2020

== Notable alumnae ==
- Patricia (Grossmith) Cladis (1955) - physicist specializing in liquid crystals.
- Frances Wasserlein (1964) - LGBTQ activist and arts community manager.
- Andrea Hannos (1991) - professional cyclist
- Stefanie von Pfetten (1991) - actress
- Danielle Kettlewell (2010) - Synchronized Swimmer at the Rio Olympics 2016 (representing Australia).
- Ceili McCabe (2019) - distance runner

== Building architecture ==
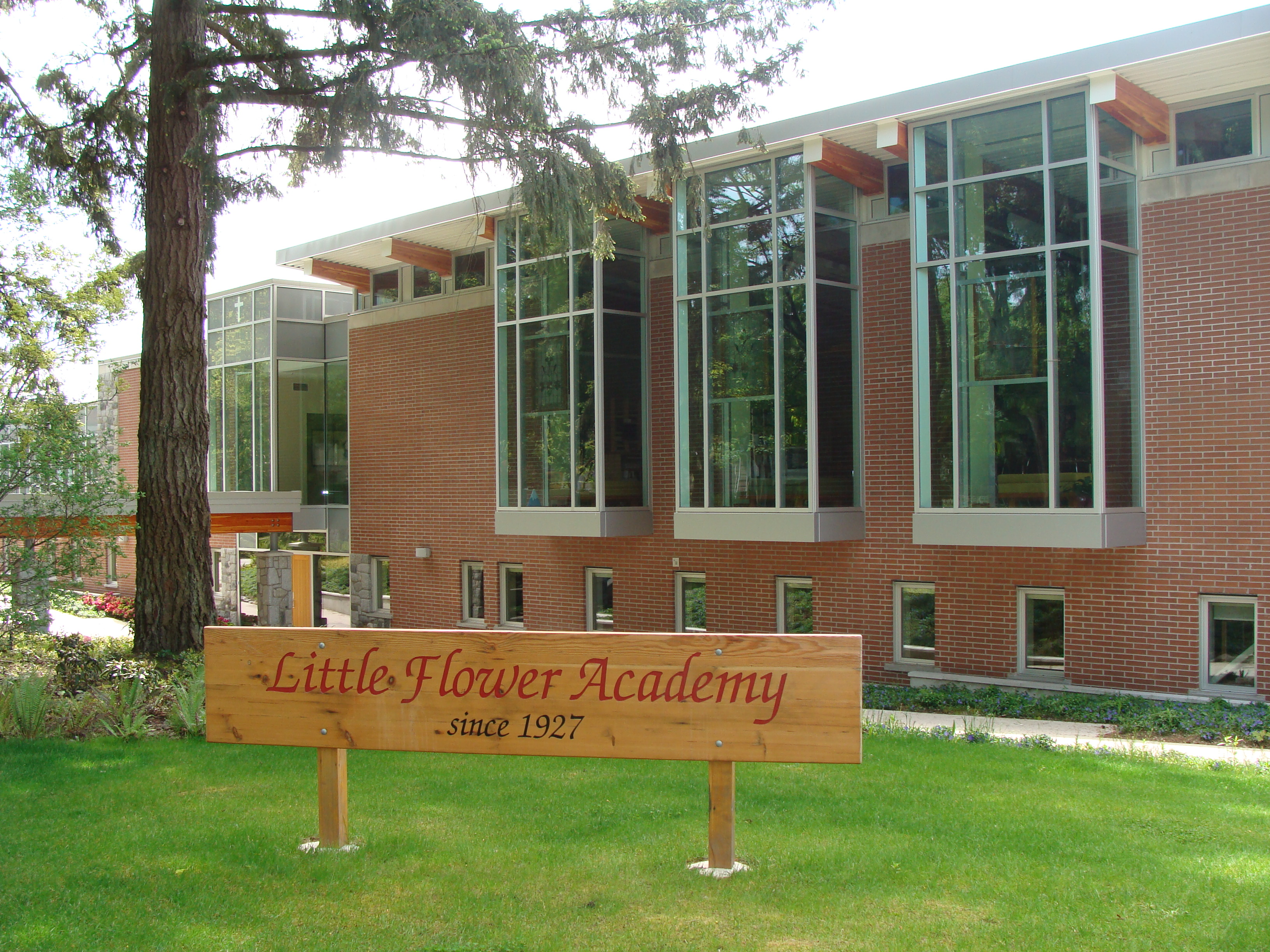
LFA's newly constructed wing & signage

Until 2005, when portions of the school were de-constructed to make room for new additions, the school's convent (a 1910 mansion) held a Guinness World Record for the most exterior windows arranged at different levels.

The 1931 library-cafeteria-art building, which was deconstructed during the 2005-2007 renovations, was once the original schoolhouse with boarding rooms in the attic. The schoolhouse ("Foundress Hall") was one of the few remaining examples of the architectural work of Sister Mary Osithe, an artist and pioneering female architect in BC who also designed the Bulkley Valley Hospital in Smithers, BC. (Details may be found in Donald Luxton's Building the West: The Early Architects of British Columbia (Talon Books, 2003).)

On September 14, 2007, the school celebrated the opening of the new wing and its 80th anniversary. Many of the features of the old buildings were salvaged during the deconstruction and integrated into the new wing. Most of the stained glass windows can be found on display in the new building; old posts are in the new gym as decoration; the hardwood floors throughout the new wing are from the old buildings; bricks from the chimneys have been used to in the new grotto; fireplaces, which have been reconditioned and made electric, are now in the library and board room; the telephone booth is in the staff room; an original door is in the lobby; and furniture can be found in both the chapel and library.
