= Vancouver College =

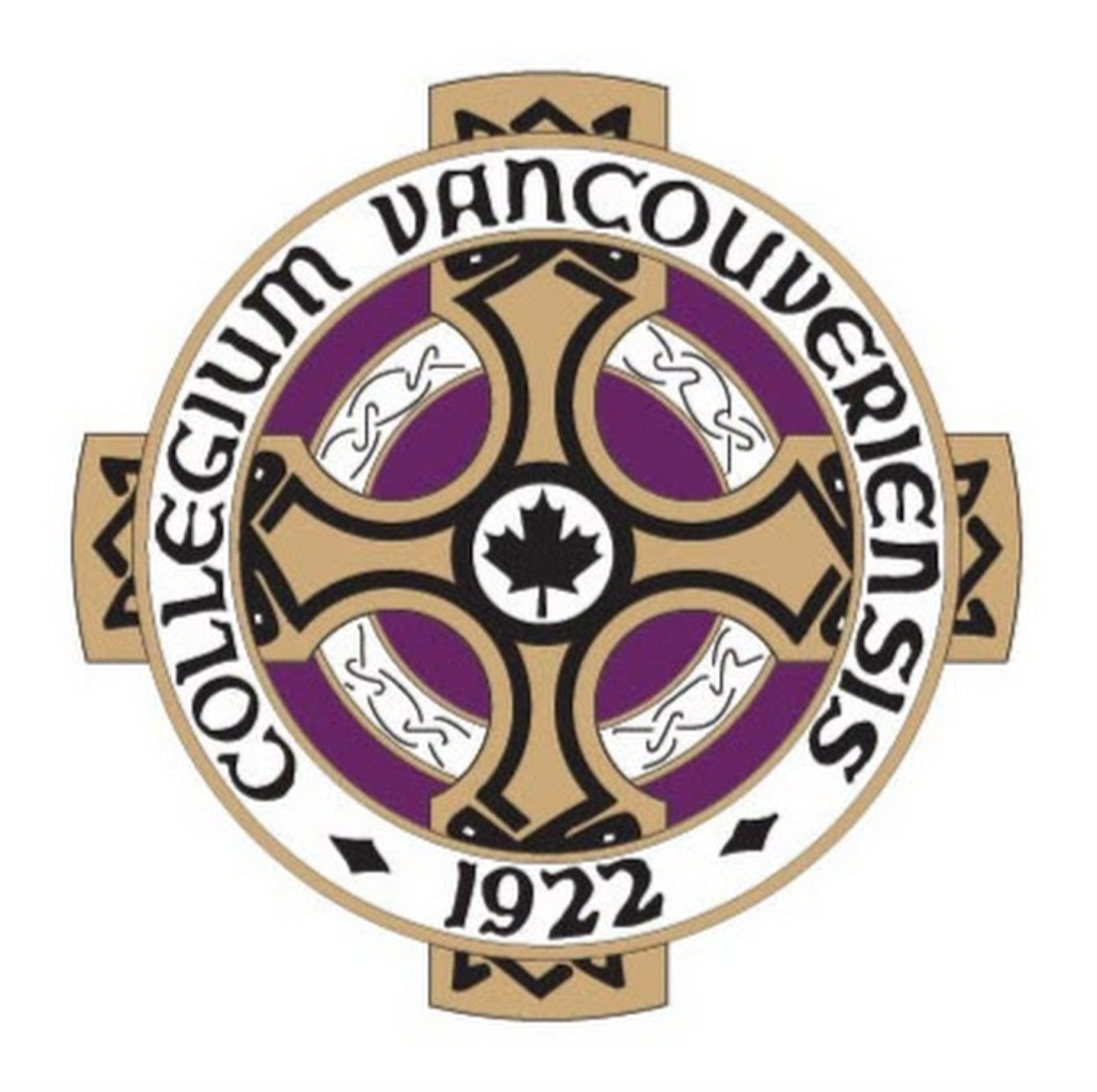
- Vancouver College Crest

Location
- 5401 Hudson Street; Vancouver, British Columbia, V6M 3A5; Canada; 49.2363°N 123.1359°W

Information
- School type: Independent
- Motto: "Semper Fidelis" (Always Faithful)
- Religious affiliation: Roman Catholic
- Founded: 1922
- Sister school: Little Flower Academy
- School board: CISVA (Catholic Independent Schools of the Vancouver Archdiocese)
- Superintendent: Sandra Marshall
- President: Daryl Weaver
- Grades: K-12
- Gender: Boys
- Enrolment: 1060 (2015–2016)
- Language: English
- Area: Shaughnessy, Vancouver
- Colours: Purple and Gold
- Mascot: Fighting Finnegan
- Team name: Fighting Irish
- Website: www.vc.bc.ca

Vancouver College (abbreviated informally to VC) is an independent K-12 university-preparatory Catholic school for boys located in the Shaughnessy neighbourhood of Vancouver, British Columbia, Canada. Founded in 1922, it is the only independent Catholic all-boys school in British Columbia. Despite the school's Catholic denomination, it is open to students of all religions. The president is Daryl Weaver.

== Campus ==
Vancouver College's campus is built around three main buildings: Lannon Hall, Manrell Hall, and Blessed Edmund Rice Hall, housing the elementary, middle, and senior schools respectively.

Following a 2013 seismic assessment that found several buildings needed replacement, the school undertook a campus redevelopment costing roughly $43 million. Manrell Hall, the middle school building, was completed and blessed by Archbishop J. Michael Miller in October 2018; it was named for the Manrell family, who contributed to its funding. Lannon Hall, housing the elementary school, was rebuilt by 2020, retaining the original 1924 cornerstone and heritage brick facade.

== Abuse allegations and litigation ==
Since 2021, Vancouver College has been a defendant in a class action lawsuit alleging decades of physical and sexual abuse by members of the Christian Brothers who taught at the school. The suit was filed by former student Darren Liptrot, who alleges he was abused by teacher Edward English between 1980 and 1985; English had previously been convicted and imprisoned for abusing children at the Mount Cashel Orphanage in St. John's, Newfoundland, before being transferred to British Columbia along with several other Christian Brothers implicated in that scandal. In March 2023, the Supreme Court of British Columbia certified the case as a class action covering students who attended Vancouver College between 1976 and 2013, and by 2025 more than 200 former students had come forward as claimants. English was separately arrested by the Vancouver Police Department in November 2023 in connection with allegations involving two Vancouver College students, though as of December 2024 no criminal charges had been laid. In March 2026, Vancouver College, along with St. Thomas More Collegiate and the Roman Catholic Archbishop of Vancouver, agreed to a proposed CAD $30 million settlement to resolve the claims. However, the agreement does not include an admission of liability or a formal apology, which survivors have criticized, and remains subject to court approval as of mid-2026.

== Principals ==
Year	Name
1922 - 1928	Br. Michael Jerome Lannon
1928 - 1930	Br. Patrick Berchmans Doyle
1930 - 1933	Br. Michael Jerome Lannon
1933 - 1939	Br. Christopher Celestine Sterling
1939 - 1945	Br. Eamonn Bonaventure Walsh
1945 - 1948	Br. Martin Donal Cunningham
1948 - 1954	Br. William Celestine Penny
1954 - 1960	Br. James Cyril Bates
1960 - 1966	Br. Francis Rupert Finch
1966 - 1968	Br. John Benedict Clarkson
1968 - 1975	Br. Henry Louis Bucher
1975 - 1977	Br. James Cyril Bates
1977 - 1983	Br. Michael Joseph Maher
1983 - 1985	Br. Paul Patrick McNiven
1985 - 1987	Br. John Majella McHugh
1987 - 1994	Br. Kenneth Joseph Farrell
1994 - 1998	Br. Kieran James Murphy
1998 - 2003	Br. Anthony Murphy
2003 - 2009	Mr. David G. Hardy
2009 - 2014	Mr. John McFarland
2014–2020	Mr. Johnny Bevaqua
2020–Present	Mr. Daryl Weaver

== Sports ==
The school competes in many sports, including:

- Badminton
- Basketball
- Cross country
- Downhill skiing
- Football
- Lacrosse
- Rowing
- Snowboarding
- Soccer
- Swimming
- Track and field
- Ultimate Frisbee
- Volleyball
- Wrestling
- Tennis
- Esports
- Golf

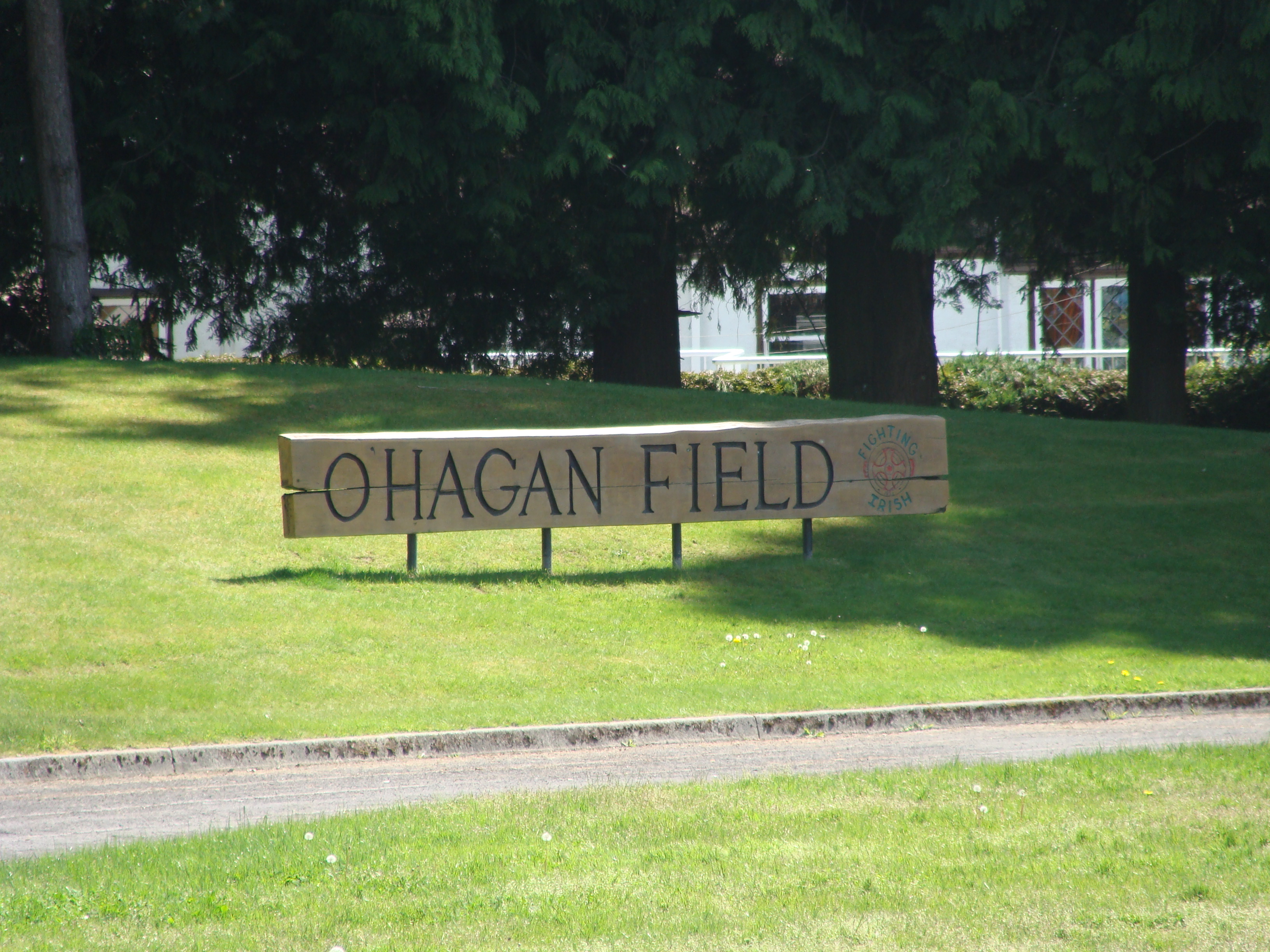
O'Hagan Field

The competitive teams are known as the "Fighting Irish".

The Fighting Irish Varsity football team have won the BC provincial title in 1967, 1992, 1994, 2010, 2019, 2022, 2023, and 2024.

== Notes ==
- Vancouver College's "sister" school is Little Flower Academy; the schools engage in activities and events together. It also has relationships with York House School and Crofton House School.
- The Vancouver College rowing team competes in the National Regatta in St. Catharines, Ontario, and has won gold in both Junior and Senior categories.
- The College has an amicable rivalry with St. George's School and competes in the annual Saints-College basketball series.
- The school is a popular shooting spot for television and film productions. A recent film production at the school is Wonder directed by Stephen Chbosky.

== Notable alumni ==
- Jamie Boreham (born 1978), professional football player
- Bryan Chiu (born 1974), professional football player
- Christian Covington (born 1993), professional football player
- Bill Cunningham (1909–1993), photographer
- Peter Dyakowski (born 1984), professional football player
- Kevin Eiben (born 1979), professional football player
- Kevin Falcon (born 1963), politician and leader of the BC United party
- Sean Fleming (born 1970), professional football player
- Tony Gallagher (born 1948), journalist
- Philip Gilbert (1931–2004), actor
- Jacob Holt (born 2003), basketball player
- Bart Hull (born 1969), professional football and hockey player
- Manny Jacinto (born 1987), actor
- Rysen John (born 1997), professional football player
- Adam Konar (born 1993), professional football player
- Cal Murphy (1932–2012), professional football coach
- Greg Ng, film editor
- Pete Ohler (born c. 1940), professional football player
- Finbarr O'Reilly (born 1971), photographer
- Tracy Pratt (born 1943), professional ice hockey player
- Marc Trasolini (born 1990), professional basketball player
- Angus Reid (born 1976), professional football player
- Philip Scrubb (born 1992), professional basketball player
- Thomas Scrubb (born 1991), professional basketball player
- Jai West (born 1976), actor
