= Subway Bowl =

In British Columbia High School Football, the Subway Bowl was until 2022 the championship game of BC High School Football (BCHSF). The games are usually played on the first weekend of December and include a Grade 8 championship, a Junior AA championship, a Junior AAA championship, a Senior AA championship, and a Senior AAA championship.

The games are played at Vancouver's BC Place the Senior AAA championship game is televised by Rogers Sportsnet Pacific and can also be watched nationwide via Shaw digital cable. Some games were also played at Empire Field in 2010 because of the retractable roof being built at BC Place Stadium.
