= J. Esmonde Barry =

Canadian activist (1923–2007)

Joseph Esmonde Barry
- Born: 25 October 1923; Saint John, New Brunswick, Canada
- Died: 31 July 2007 (aged 83); Ottawa, Ontario, Canada
- Resting place: St. Joseph's Cemetery, Saint John, New Brunswick
- Education: University of St. Joseph's College and University of New Brunswick Saint John
- Occupations: Office manager, investment broker, sales representative
- Years active: 1947–1986
- Employer(s): Dominion Securities Corp. Harris & Partners Ltd., Richardson Securities of Canada, Eastern Securities Ltd., International Harvester Company
- Organization(s): Knights of Columbus, Friends of St. Joseph's
- Known for: community activism and political commentary
- Notable work: Escape from Romania
- Board member of: Board of Governors of St. Thomas University, Board of Trustees for School District 20, NB Social Service Council
- Spouse: Helena Maureen (née Strang) Barry
- Children: Dr. Brian Michael Barry, Katherine Ann Barry Cotton, Kevin Patrick Barry, Mary Jane Frank, Mary Ellen Sargent, Ronald Joseph Barry, Eileen Patricia Keating, Paul Gregory Barry, Capt. Denis Esmonde Barry, John Joseph Barry, Christopher Francis Barry and Dr. Susan Maureen Bianchi
- Parents: Patrick Esmonde Barry (father); Eileen Elizabeth (née Horgan) Barry (mother)
- Awards: New Brunswick Day Merit Award for Public Service, The Bishop William Dollard Medal of Merit, Knights of Columbus Pope Paul Medal of Merit

Joseph Esmonde Barry (25 October 1923 – 31 July 2007) was a prominent healthcare activist and political commentator in New Brunswick, Canada. Perhaps best known as the voice of the Friends of St. Joseph's, an organization which was instrumental in keeping St. Joseph's Hospital open in Saint John's uptown. Barry also lobbied for compensation for those involved in the hepatitis C tainted blood scandal of the 1980s.

== Early life and family ==
Esmonde was born to Irish Canadian parents on 25 October 1923 in Saint John, New Brunswick, Canada. His father was P. Esmonde Barry, who served as Private Secretary to The Honourable William Pugsley, PC, QC prior to being appointed Postmaster on the trains between Montreal and Halifax. P. Esmonde was the son of James Barry, the son of an Irish immigrant from County Cork and first principal of St. Malachi's Boys' Grade School from 1879 to 1902 and federally-appointed District Inspector of Weights and Measures from 1902 until his death in 1923. Esmonde's mother was Eileen (née Horgan) Barry, whose grandparents were also natives of County Cork. He married H. Maureen (née Strang) Barry on 30 September 1950 at Melrose, NB, with whom he raised a family of 12 children: Brian, Katherine, Kevin, M. Jane, M. Ellen, Ronald, Eileen, P. Gregory, Denis, J. Joseph, Christopher, and Susan. Esmonde and Maureen were married nearly 57 years and, at the time of his death, their family had produced 30 grandchildren and 2 great-grandchildren.

== Education and career ==
After graduating from St. Vincent's Boys' School in 1941, he received his Bachelor of Arts from the University of St. Joseph's College in Memramcook, NB in 1946. Esmonde was a Sales Representative, then Zone Manager for International Harvester Company between 1947 and 1956. In 1957, he received his Investment Dealer License from the University of New Brunswick Saint John and became a Registered Representative for Eastern Securities Ltd. in 1958. In 1964 he joined Richardson Securities, then began a 16-year tenure at Dominion Securities Corp. (later Dominion Securities Corp. Harris & Partners Ltd.) in 1970. Barry became Manager of the Saint John office in 1975 and held that position until his retirement in 1986.

== Community Contributions ==
Barry was best known for his lifetime of community involvement, including his years spent as founding chairman and spokesperson of the Friends of St. Joseph's, a prominent healthcare advocacy group in the Province of New Brunswick. The Friends of St. Joseph's were widely credited with keeping St. Joseph's Hospital open in Saint John's city centre. He likened the quest he began in 1976 to save the facility to a real bare-knuckle fight. "A good fighter, after he's knocked down two or three times, he gets up," Barry once said. "That's what makes a champion. I think we're going to be champions before this is over." For thirty years, he was a strong advocate for improved health care in the Province of New Brunswick. The organisation was resurrected under Barry's leadership during New Brunswick's Liberal McKenna government, at the request of then Saint John Mayor Elsie Wayne Elsie Wayne. St. Joseph's Hospital remains open to this day in Saint John.

The healthcare activist is also widely credited for the decision taken by New Brunswick's Liberal Graham government and Health Minister Michael Murphy, to designate the Saint John Regional Hospital as the Province's Trauma Centre. Among his final acts, Barry submitted an opinion editorial on the subject to his son, Telegraph-Journal Managing Editor Ronald Barry. In his submission ('Politics Must Take Back Seat in Trauma Centre Debate'), which was published four days after his death, he wrote, "Common sense demands intelligent and reasoned vision of the future. Saint John is the largest industrial city in New Brunswick and no other municipality compares with it....[T]here is greater risk of serious injury and trauma than in any other area in the province." Barry called on local politicians and business leaders to serve their community as strong and vocal advocates for locating the Trauma Centre in Saint John. In the end, Barry's hope that healthcare would prevail over politics became a reality.

Esmonde gave 60 years of service to the Knights of Columbus, the world's largest Catholic family fraternal service organisation, having joined in 1947. He has held the positions of Member, Recorder, Chancellor, Deputy Grand Knight, Grand Knight (1964–66), State Treasurer and State Deputy for the Province of New Brunswick. At the Supreme Office level he was Supreme Director of the Atlantic Provinces from 1971 to 1974 and Vice Supreme Master of the Fourth Degree for the Atlantic Provinces in 1979.

Barry also lobbied for compensation for those involved in the hepatitis C tainted blood scandal of the 1980s. He was himself infected by a blood transfusion during a triple bypass in Montreal in 1986. Other organisations and boards Esmonde served on were the Protestant Orphanage Committee; Board Member and first President, Friends of Children's Aid Society; Director Saint John Board of Trustees for School District 20; Director, NB Social Service Council; Member of the Better Business Bureau; Member of Central Business Development Corporation; Member of the Steering Committee of the Catholic Priests Pension Fund; Member of the Board of Governors of St. Thomas University; Founding Member and Chairperson of the Friends of St. Joseph's Hospital; Founder of the Coalition for Seniors and Nursing Home Residents' Rights; Founding Member of the Hepatitis C Society, Saint John Chapter; and lastly a Member of the Friends of Healthcare. He received The Bishop William Dollard Medal of Merit, Diocese of Saint John, and the Knights of Columbus Pope Paul Medal of Merit.

Following his retirement he contributed with a weekly column in the Catholic New Freeman under the heading "Thoughts for Today" for a period of time. Periodically he was a commentator on 92.7 University of New Brunswick Saint John (UNBSJ) Radio. He had written many guest commentaries in the Telegraph-Journal and several articles for the Canadian Messenger. He was the author of Escape from Romania, which was published by Gregory Kennedy in 1993. The book tells Gregory and Patricia Kennedy's story of their adoption of a Romanian girl named Milah.

== Death ==
Esmonde Barry died on 31 July 2007 in his 84th year at the University of Ottawa Heart Institute. His funeral mass was held at the Cathedral of the Immaculate Conception on 8 August 2007 where his body was led by the honour guard of the Knights of Columbus. The Cathedral filled with mourners for the funeral which was attended by 25 clergymen, including The Most Rev. Bishop Edward Troy, Bishop Emeritus and The Most Rev. Bishop Faber MacDonald, Bishop Emeritus, and celebrated by Barry's brother The Rev. Kevin M. Barry of St. Alphonsus Parish in Hampton, NB. He was buried in the rain at St. Joseph's Cemetery in Saint John.

At the time of his death, many community leaders paid tribute to Barry's contributions to the Province of New Brunswick. McKenna-era New Brunswick Solicitor General Jane Barry noted that although she didn't always agree with his point of view, she always respected him. She added, "He certainly was very dedicated to the causes which he believed in, and yes, people like that are somewhat rare."

In an editorial, the Telegraph-Journal (New Brunswick's newspaper of record) noted that, "Barry...believed passionately in the need for proper healthcare in Saint John, and the continued operation of the uptown urgent care centre at St. Joseph's Hospital. He pursued that goal with equal parts emotion and good sense." The newspaper added that Barry was known for, "conviction, compassion, strength, courage and love of family....He knew that true politics is not about power and money. It's about doing the right thing."

Barry's successor as spokesperson for the Friends of St. Joseph's Hospital, Saint John Mayor Ivan Court, noted in his newspaper submission that, "As a health care advocate, he was second-to-none in the Province of New Brunswick...Esmonde's insight into the problems associated with the delivery of quality healthcare and the solutions for improvement were years ahead of both Hospital Board and Government actions to alleviate the stress on the system....[He] was instrumental in lobbying the government for the introduction of nurse practitioners; higher wages for nurses, doctors and health care workers; reductions in costs for patients in nursing homes; the need for two hospitals in Saint John; and in his final letter to the Telegraph-Journal, the recognition of the Regional Hospital as the Trauma Centre."

Hatfield-era New Brunswick Cabinet minister Yvon Poitras was quoted as saying, "He's fought for humanitarian causes all his life. He did all of this with nothing in return. More than anything else, I respected him." While, The Most Rev. Bishop Edward Troy recalled his friend as a gifted man, a champion of faith and a great family man.

== Legacy ==
The Esmonde Barry Healthcare Scholarship was established after Barry's death for students of the successor of his alma mater, St. Malachy's Memorial High School, who are entering post-secondary studies in a healthcare field. The scholarship is valued at $1000 and is awarded to honours or high honours graduates who have participated in volunteer service to benefit others on an ongoing basis. Barry's daughter, Eileen Keating, presented the first two scholarships in 2008.

In recognition for his community contributions, Barry was posthumously awarded the New Brunswick Day Merit Award for Public Service by Saint John Mayor Ivan Court and Hon. Ed Doherty, M.D., Minister of Post-Secondary Education, Training and Labour. It was accepted by his wife, Maureen Barry on 25 July 2008. Maureen Barry also accepted an award posthumously presented to her husband at Saint John Common Council in recognition of his contributions in founding the Coalition for Seniors and Nursing Homes Residents' Rights. Coalition President Hector J. Cormier remarked, "(We pay) special tribute to the late Esmonde Barry for his determination to bring together individuals and groups for a common and most worthy cause."
