= Diocese of Charlottetown =

Catholic ecclesiastical territory

Coordinates: 46.2338°N 63.1251°W

Diocese of Charlottetown Dioecesis Carolinapolitana Diocèse de Charlottetown Sgìre-easbaig Bhaile Shearlot

Catholic
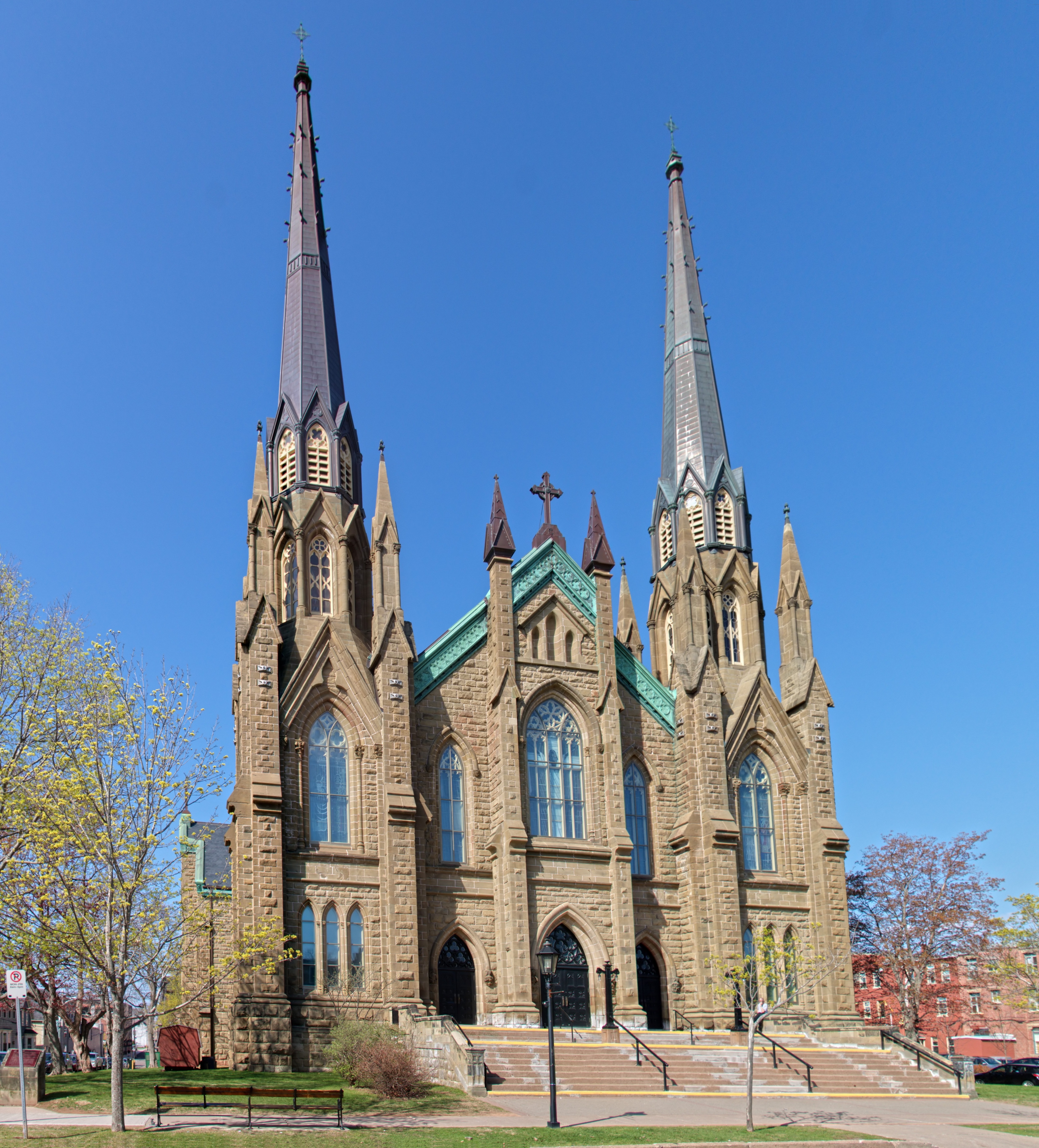
- Cathedral–Basilica of Saint Dunstan

Location
- Country: Canada
- Territory: Prince Edward Island
- Ecclesiastical region: Atlantic
- Ecclesiastical province: (Nova Scotia) Halifax–Yarmouth
- Headquarters: Catholic Centre #350 North River Rd., Charlottetown, PE C1A 7L9

Statistics
- Area: 5,686 km^{2} (2,195 sq mi)
- Population: Total; Catholics: (as of 2021); 159,713; 68,150 (42.7%)
- Parishes: 52

Information
- Denomination: Catholic Church
- Sui iuris church: Latin Church
- Rite: Roman Rite
- Established: August 11, 1829; 197 years ago
- Cathedral: Cathedral–Basilica of Saint Dunstan
- Patron saint: Dunstan, Archbishop of Canterbury
- Secular priests: 39
- Language: English and French

Current leadership
- Pope: Leo XIV
- Bishop: sede vacante
- Metropolitan Archbishop: Brian Joseph Dunn
- Apostolic Administrator: Jim Willick
- Bishops emeritus: Richard John Grecco; Joseph Andrzej Dabrowski, CSMA

Map
- Jurisdiction of the diocese within Canada.

Website
- www.dioceseofcharlottetown.com
- All current statistics are based from updated data taken by Catholic-Hierarchy.org.

The Roman Catholic Diocese of Charlottetown (Latin: Dioecesis Carolinapolitana) is a diocese of the Catholic Church in Canada. It is a suffragan diocese comprising the entire province of Prince Edward Island.

Originally carved from the Archdiocese of Quebec on August 11, 1829, it was transferred to the Archdiocese of Halifax–Yarmouth on May 4, 1852. It is the second-oldest English-speaking diocese in Canada.

Its seat is the Cathedral–Basilica of Saint Dunstan in downtown Charlottetown.

== History ==
=== Early history ===
Then known as Île Saint-Jean, the island was initially part of the vast Diocese of Quebec. In the spring of 1721, René-Charles de Breslay and Marie-Anselme de Metivier, priests of the Society of Saint Sulpice, arrived at the Acadian settlement of Port-LaJoye and built a small church dedicated to Saint John the Evangelist. It was then handed-over to Franciscan priests from Louisbourg (in modern-day Nova Scotia) two years later.

By 1752, four more small parishes were then established. In 1758, however, following the Île Saint-Jean campaign, British authorities expelled the Acadians.

=== Scottish immigration and establishment ===
Roughly three years after separation from Nova Scotia and becoming its own colony, a further expansion of the Church on now-renamed Saint John's Island began in 1772, when the first band of about 200 Scottish Catholic immigrants set foot, led by the layman John MacDonald of Glenaladale. The idea was conceived and the financed by two bishops of the Scottish Catholic Church — John MacDonald and George Hay — in order to relieve the persecution of Catholics on Uist. They were accompanied by James MacDonald, a cousin of John of Glenaladale. MacDonald was well-suited for the assignment, as he was fluent in Gaelic, English, Latin, and French.

Another group of Scots settled in 1790, led by Angus MacEachern, to join their families who had migrated earlier. MacEachern spoke English, French, and Gaelic. He traveled extensively throughout the Maritimes as a missionary. He built the original Saint Dunstan's in 1816. MacEachern served as an auxiliary bishop of Quebec from 1821 until 1829, when he became the first-ever Bishop of Charlottetown.

=== Split and transfer to new metropolitan see ===
On September 30, 1842, the diocese was then split off when the new Diocese of Saint John in New Brunswick was created. Ten years later, on May 4, 1852, the diocese was officially transferred to the recently elevated Archdiocese of Halifax (now Halifax–Yarmouth).

On July 20, 1946, another piece of its territory was split off again, as the Magdalen Islands were transferred to the Diocese of Gaspé.

== Education ==
=== Saint Dunstan's University ===
In 1831, MacEachern established Saint Andrew's College. Although it was closed down by Bernard Donald Macdonald in 1844, he also supervised the construction of Saint Dunstan's College in Charlottetown in 1848 and its eventual opening on January 15, 1855. It was built to respond to the needs of Catholic students on the Island, as opposed to Prince of Wales College, which was a majority-Protestant public institution.

In 1969, as part of the Prince Edward Island Comprehensive Development Plan designed by the government of then-premier Alex Campbell, the two schools amalgamated to form the University of Prince Edward Island.

== Healthcare ==
Charlottetown Hospital was established in 1879, under the leadership of Peter McIntyre. It was the first hospital in Charlottetown. In 1982, the Charlottetown Hospital closed its doors when the Queen Elizabeth Hospital on Riverside Drive opened. The campus on Haviland Street is now the Tourism and Culinary Centre of Holland College.

== Community ==
=== Priests ===
As of 2021, there are a total of 40 priests (39 diocesan and 1 religious) serving within the jurisdiction of the diocese.

==== Past ====
- Sisters of Charity of Montreal (1879–1925)
- Filles de Jésus (1903–1909)
- Little Sisters of the Holy Family (1909–1916)
- Sisters of the Precious Blood (1929–2012)
- Notre-Dame-du-Sacré-Coeur (1959–1979)
- Servantes du Saint Cœur de Marie (1977–1989)

== Ordinaries ==
=== Diocesan Bishops ===
Bishop		Period in Office	Coat of Arms
1.	Angus Bernard MacEachern† (1759–1835)	August 11, 1829 – April 22, 1835 (5 years, 254 days)	
2.	Bernard Donald McDonald† (1797–1859)	February 21, 1837 – December 30, 1859 (22 years, 312 days)	
3.	Peter McIntyre† (1818–1891)	August 15, 1860 – May 1, 1891 (30 years, 259 days)	
4.	James Charles McDonald† (1840–1912)	May 1, 1891 – December 1, 1912 (21 years, 214 days)	
5.	Henry Joseph O'Leary† (1879–1938)	January 29, 1913 – September 7, 1920 (7 years, 222 days)	
6.	Louis James O'Leary† (1877–1930)	September 10, 1920 – July 8, 1930 (9 years, 301 days)	
7.	Joseph Anthony O'Sullivan† (1886–1972)	February 6, 1931 – February 26, 1944 (13 years, 20 days)	
8.	James Boyle† (1885–1954)	March 18, 1944 – June 3, 1954 (10 years, 77 days)	
9.	Malcolm Angus MacEachern† (1901–1982)	November 27, 1954 – February 24, 1970 (15 years, 89 days)	
10.	Francis John Spence† (1926–2011)	August 17, 1970 – April 24, 1982 (11 years, 250 days)	
11.	James Hector MacDonald, CSC† (1925–2025)	August 12, 1982 – February 2, 1991 (8 years, 174 days)	
12.	Joseph Vernon Fougère† (1943–2013)	December 11, 1991 – July 11, 2009 (17 years, 212 days)	
13.	Richard John Grecco (b. 1946)	July 11, 2009 – March 4, 2021 (11 years, 236 days)	
14.	Joseph Andrzej Dabrowski, CSMA (b. 1964)	April 2, 2023 – November 1, 2025 (2 years, 213 days)	

=== Affiliated Bishops ===
- Joseph Faber MacDonald† – Bishop of Grand Falls, Newfoundland and Labrador
