= Joseph Dabrowski (born 1964) =

Polish-Canadian Catholic prelate (born 1964)

His Excellency, the Most Reverend Joseph Andrzej Dabrowski CSMA
- Bishop of Hamilton
- Native name: Józef Andrzej Dąbrowski
- Church: Catholic
- Diocese: Hamilton
- Appointed: November 1, 2025
- Installed: February 2, 2026
- Predecessor: Douglas Crosby
- Previous posts: North American Superior of the Congregation of Saint Michael the Archangel (2013‍–‍2015); Auxiliary Bishop of London in Ontario (2015‍–‍2023); Bishop of Charlottetown (2023‍–‍2025)

Orders
- Ordination: May 4, 1991 by Divo Zadi
- Consecration: April 14, 2015 by Ronald Peter Fabbro, Thomas Christopher Collins, and John Michael Sherlock

Personal details
- Born: July 17, 1964 (age 62) Wysoka Strzyżowska, Poland
- Education: Pontifical Athenaeum of St. Anselm
- Motto: Jesu In Te Confido (Latin for 'Jesus, I Trust In You')
- Coat of arms: Joseph Andrzej Dabrowski's coat of arms

Styles of Joseph Dabrowski
- Reference style: His Excellency, The Most Reverend
- Spoken style: The Most Reverend

Joseph Andrzej Dabrowski CSMA (born July 17, 1964) is a Polish-Canadian prelate of the Catholic Church who has served as the 14th Bishop of the Diocese of Charlottetown from June 29, 2023 until 2025. He now serves as the 10th Bishop of the Diocese of Hamilton. Pope Leo XIV appointed Bishop Dabrowski the Bishop of Hamilton on November 1, 2025 although his official installation was on February 2, 2026. He previously served as auxiliary bishop of the London in Ontario from 2015 to 2023. Prior to being consecrated a bishop, he was the North American superior of the Congregation of Saint Michael the Archangel beginning in 2013. On April 2, 2023, Pope Francis appointed Dabrowski Bishop of the Diocese of Charlottetown following the retirement of Bishop Richard Grecco.

== Biography ==
=== Early life ===
Dabrowski was born in Wysoka Strzyżowska, Poland, and completed secondary school at the minor seminary of the Congregation of Saint Michael the Archangel. Inspired by his uncle, a Catholic priest, Dabrowski began seminary studies at the San Pietro Theological Institute in Viterbo, and was awarded a masters degree in philosophy and theology by the Pontificial Athenaeum of St. Anselm, and was ordained to the priesthood on May 4, 1991 by Divo Zadi, bishop of Civita Castellana.

=== Priesthood ===
Joseph Dabrowski served as associate pastor at Our Lady of Częstochowa church until 1993, when he became chaplain of Cardinal Carter High School. He was made Pastor of St. Mary's Church, London, in 1991, a role he retained for eighteen years.

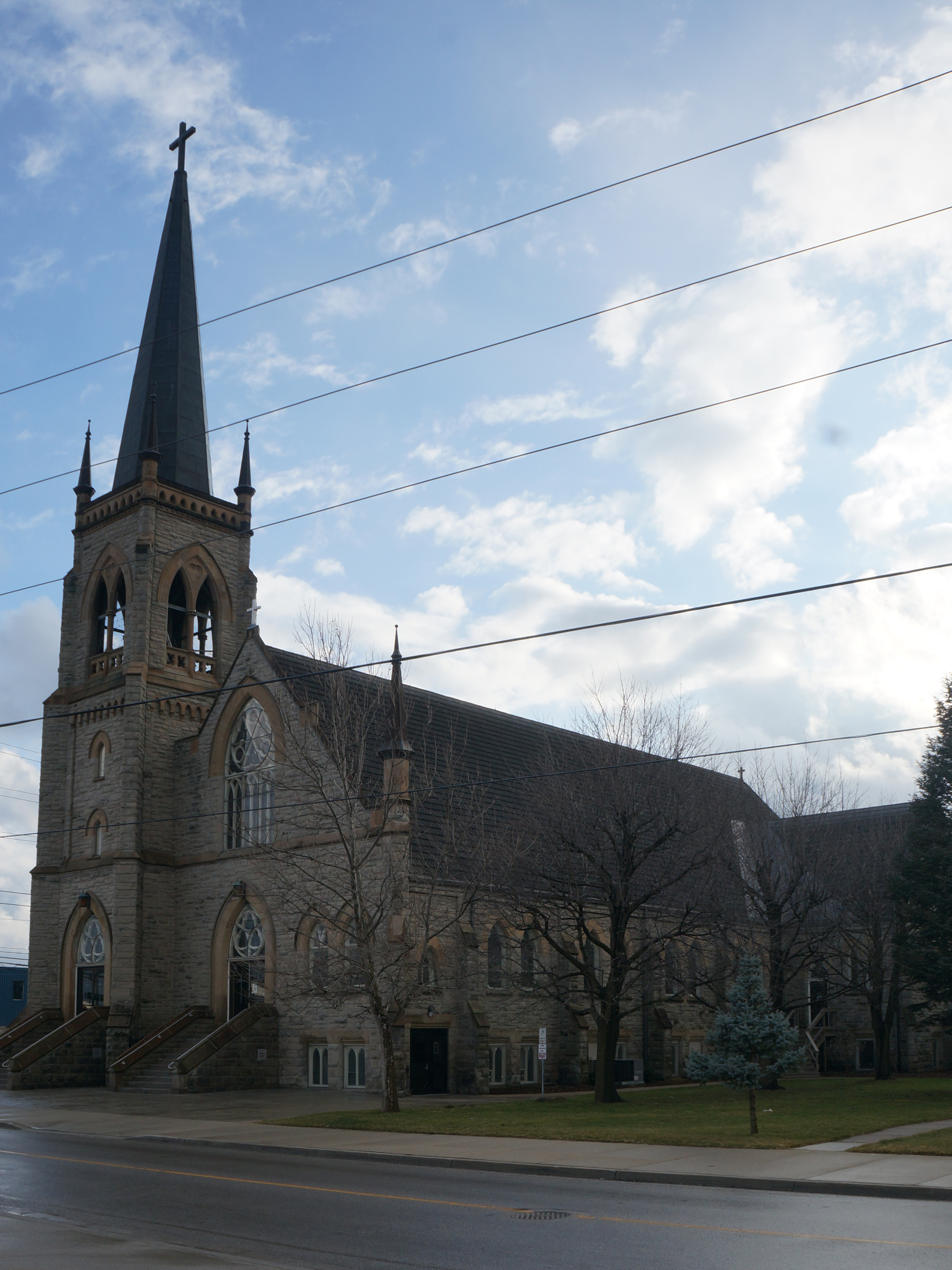
St. Mary's Church, where Dabrowski served from 1998 to 2015.

He served as adjunct spiritual director to St. Peter's Seminary from 2002 to 2003, and became North American superior of the Warsaw-based Congregation of Saint Michael the Archangel on June 19, 2013. Dabrowski is fluent in Polish, English, and Italian, and has studied Russian, Latin, and Spanish.

=== Episcopacy ===
On January 31, 2015, Dabrowski was appointed auxiliary bishop of the London in Ontario by Pope Francis. He was consecrated a bishop on April 14, 2015, by Bishop Ronald Fabbro.

On 1 November 2025, Pope Leo appointed Bishop Dąbrowski as the new Bishop of Hamilton

He chose "Jesu in Te Confido" — meaning "Jesus, I Trust in You" — as his episcopal motto, in reference to Divine Mercy and the visions of Jesus Christ reported by Faustina Kowalska.

=== Coat of arms ===
Bishop Dabrowski's coat of arms has three main sections. The letter M with the crown represents the Blessed Virgin Mary as Mother of God and Mother of the Church. He included this in the coat of arms due to his strong Marian devotion. To the right of that is a letter J with the carpenter's square represents Saint Joseph the Patron Saint of the Universal Church and Canada. It also connects the bishop to his home parish of St. Joseph in Wysoka Strzyżowska, Poland. It also reflects Bishop Dabrowski's baptismal name. The symbol in the green section with the flaming sword with wings represents Saint Michael the Archangel, the defender of the Church. He included this because of his spiritual roots in the Congregation of Saint Michael the Archangel (the Michaelite Fathers). The colours also connect to important places for him. Poland and Canada have white and red on their flags, and Italy has white, red and green. The reason for these countries' representation is: Poland - his homeland, Canada - his present home, and Italy - where he received his priestly formation and ordination.
