= Lupe Serrano =

American ballet dancer (1930–2023)

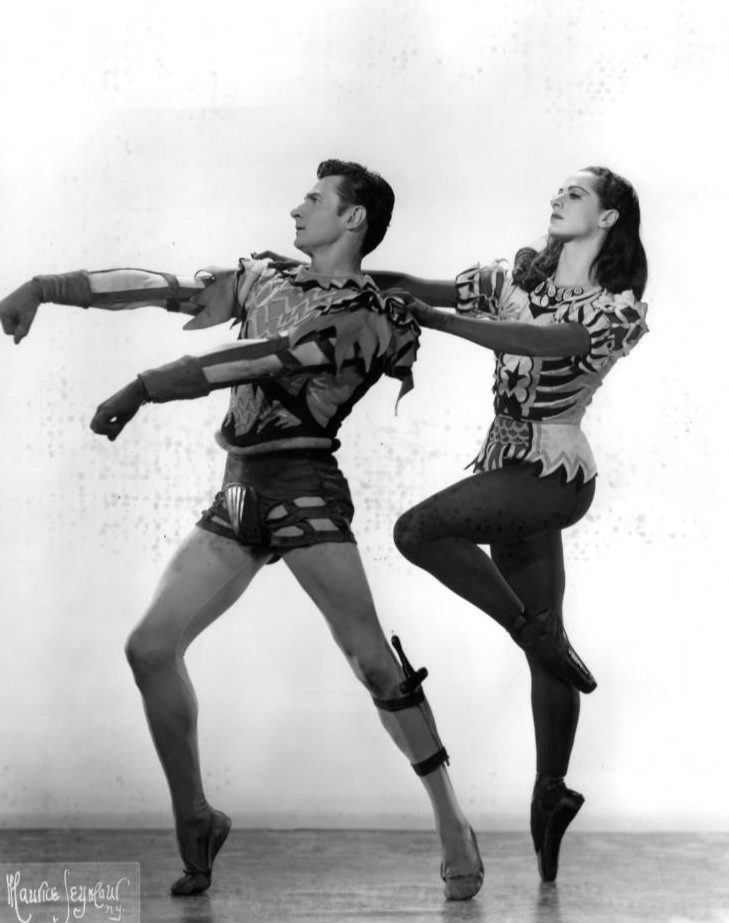
- Serrano (right) with John Kriza in 1957
- Born: Guadalupe Martínez Desfassiaux Serrano; December 7, 1930; Santiago, Chile
- Died: January 16, 2023 (aged 92); Syosset, New York, U.S.
- Occupations: Ballet dancer; ballet teacher
- Employer: American Ballet Theatre

Guadalupe Martínez Desfassiaux Serrano (December 7, 1930 – January 16, 2023), known professionally as Lupe Serrano, was a Chilean-born, Mexican-trained American ballet dancer and teacher. She spent most of her dance career at the American Ballet Theatre (ABT), where she was the troupe's first Hispanic American principal dancer.

She began dancing professionally in 1944 at age 13 with the Mexico City Ballet. She then moved to New York and joined ABT in 1953. She rose to international prominence after her performances in the Soviet Union, and also toured Europe and South America with ABT. Other highlights of her professional career included a celebrated but brief partnership with Rudolf Nureyev following his defection to the West. She retired from the stage in 1971.

Serrano began teaching in 1968, at the University of Wisconsin–Milwaukee and the College Conservatory of Milwaukee. After she retired from performing, she held various teaching and administrative roles at the National Academy of Arts in Illinois and Pennsylvania Ballet before she became an artistic associate with The Washington Ballet, a position she held for ten years beginning in 1988. She later returned to ABT to teach company classes at the Jacqueline Kennedy Onassis School. Her fifty-year teaching career also included masterclasses and guest teaching.

== Early life and education ==
Serrano was born in Santiago, Chile, in 1930. Her father, musician Luis Martínez Serrano, was a composer, conductor, and pianist from Barcelona, Spain, and was raised in Buenos Aires, Argentina. Her mother, Luciana Desfassiaux, was a native of Mexico, whose parents were originally from France. After marrying in Mexico, her father accepted a job conducting an orchestra touring South America so he could introduce his expectant wife to his parents. Lupe was born on December 7 in Chile, where her parents decided to remain after Luis became ill during Luciana's recovery from childbirth. She had one brother, Carlos Martínez Desfassiaux.

Demonstrating a love of dance from a very young age, Lupe Serrano began studying dance in Santiago from the age of four at a suburban dance school that offered lessons in ballet, modern dance, and castanets. Her family moved back to Mexico City when she was thirteen. In Mexico, she began formal dance training with Nelsy Dambré, a former dancer with the Paris Opera Ballet.

After Serrano made her professional debut, she continued her high school classes and completed the last two years of high school within one year, so she could tour. Upon graduating, she took courses at the Palacio de Bellas Artes in subjects such as English, French, drama, history, and folklore, to learn as much as possible about each of her dances.

== Performing career ==
In 1944, the 13-year-old Serrano began dancing with the Mexico City Ballet. She made her professional debut in Fokine's Les Sylphides. By the age of 17, Lupe Serrano had become a celebrity in Mexico. In 1948, after taking a company class with famed Cuban dancer Alicia Alonso, Serrano accepted an invitation to join her new company Ballet Alicia Alonso, later known as the Ballet Nacional de Cuba, on a tour through Central America and Colombia for three months. Upon returning to Mexico City, she joined Ballet Nelsy Dambré, a new ballet company formed by her former teacher, which folded after eighteen months. In 1951, Serrano moved to New York and joined Ballet Russe de Monte-Carlo as a soloist and toured across North and South America, returning to Mexico to feature in a television program after that troupe also folded. In 1952, she joined Ballet Concerts, a company formed by Igor Schwezoff, and toured South America.

Serrano joined the American Ballet Theatre in New York in 1953 after the former road manager of Ballet Russe, now working with ABT, invited her to audition. She joined as the first Hispanic American principal dancer in ABT history. Her repertoire included lead roles in major classical ballets such as Swan Lake, Giselle, Aurora's Wedding, and the Don Quixote pas de deux. Critic Clive Barnes said in The New York Times that her characterization of Odile was "flashingly malevolent", and that her performance in ABT's full-length version of Swan Lake "explod[ed] into a nervous and very exciting brilliance". Also writing for The New York Times, critic Allen Hughes declared her performance of Giselle as a "personal triumph" which "indicated that Lupe Serrano must now be ranked as one of greatest ballerinas dancing today."

Serrano created several roles at ABT for Capital of the World by Eugene Loring, Paean by Herbert Ross, Sebastian by Agnes de Mille, and Lady from the Sea by Birgit Cullberg. In addition, she danced other ballets by de Mille, George Balanchine, Jerome Robbins, Antony Tudor, and William Dollar. Her most successful partnerships were with Erik Bruhn and Royes Fernandez. Between 1958 and 1959, she also danced with Metropolitan Opera Ballet, in the operas La Gioconda and Die Fledermaus.

In 1960, Serrano toured in Russia with ABT, the first time that any American ballet company had toured the Soviet Union. At the Stanislavsky Theatre in Moscow, she received twelve curtain calls after dancing William Dollard's The Combat. During her performance in Leningrad (present-day St. Petersburg), the audience insisted that she dance her solo again as an encore, after seven curtain calls; it was the first encore performed in ABT's twenty-year history. The following day, the ballet critic for Pravda wrote, "For her (Miss Serrano), technical difficulties do not seem to exist – there is a real freedom of ease and virtuosity." At a party hosted by United States ambassador to Russia Llewellyn Thompson, Serrano was congratulated by Bolshoi Ballet prima ballerina Galina Ulanova, who said, "You have a nice, easy, and light technique. You are to be admired. I have learned much by looking at you." Meanwhile, American newspapers ran headlines such as "Lupe Serrano Captivates Moscow on American Ballet Theatre Tour" and "Lupe Serrano Dazzles Russ[ia] in 'Don Quixote'", and declared that "Lupe Serrano had captured Moscow." Following their return from the USSR, critic John Martin suggested in The New York Times that "something about [Serrano's] success must have given her a new sense of her art, for she has returned in every way finer and more exciting than before."

After Rudolf Nureyev defected to the West in 1961, he invited Serrano to partner with him, forming a celebrated but brief partnership. One of their most famous performances was on The Bell Telephone Hour in 1962, when they danced a pas de deux from Le Corsaire. After Serrano gave birth to her second child in 1967, she became a permanent guest dancer with ABT, an arrangement that gave her more freedom in choosing her performances and allowed her to spend more time with her family. The same year, Serrano danced excerpts from Raymonda for President Lyndon B. Johnson at the White House. She then returned to the Soviet Union for another critically acclaimed tour with the ABT. She retired from the stage in 1971.

== Teaching career ==
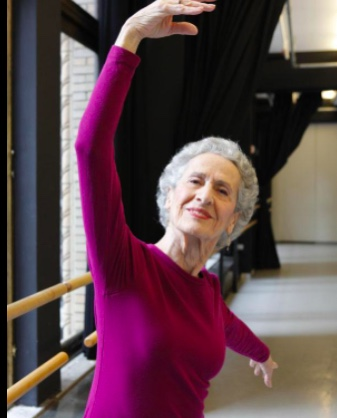
Lupe Serrano in 2022

Serrano had a teaching career spanning five decades. She started teaching in 1968, while she was still dancing as a guest performer with the American Ballet Theatre. Her first teaching positions were at the University of Wisconsin–Milwaukee and the College Conservatory of Milwaukee, after her husband took a job in the city.

In 1971, after she retired from the stage, she accepted a full-time position as assistant director at the National Academy of Arts in Champaign, Illinois. She joined the faculty of the Pennsylvania Ballet as company teacher and head of the apprentice program in 1974, and remained for fourteen years, serving as director of the Pennsylvania Ballet School from 1977. In 1981, Ballet News reported, "Not only has Serrano kept her perfect figure but, without pausing for breath, she can rip off a brilliantly executed allegro combination that stymies even company members and guarantees a permanent crowd of awestruck acolytes at her studio doors."

In 1988, Serrano moved to Washington, D.C., and became an artistic associate of The Washington Ballet for ten years. In 1997, she began teaching classes at the Juilliard School. She later taught company class at ABT, and served on the faculty of the Jacqueline Kennedy Onassis School. She was a guest teacher and taught masterclasses for companies throughout the United States, such as the San Francisco Ballet, Cleveland Ballet, and Cincinnati Ballet, as well as the Rome Opera Ballet in Italy. She was also a sought-after judge in international ballet competitions.

== Personal life ==
In 1957, Serrano married composer Kenneth Schermerhorn, who was musical director for the American Ballet Theatre and later worked with the New Jersey Symphony. She was naturalized as an American citizen in August 1961.

After their first child, Erica, was born in 1963, Serrano returned to work at ABT, commuting daily from their home in New Jersey. A 1965 review in The New York Times praised Serrano's musicality in performing the lead in Giselle, noting that her husband Schermerhorn was conducting, "ready with rallentandos when they were needed for expansive lifts and with accelerandos when fleet footwork was involved."

She took a year off after giving birth to their second daughter, Veronica, in 1967. They moved as a family to Wisconsin, after Schermerhorn became the music director of the Milwaukee Symphony Orchestra. Serrano and Schermerhorn divorced around the same time she retired as a performer. When Serrano started teaching at the Pennsylvania Ballet School, both her daughters took classes there. Her daughter Veronica Lynn later became a soloist with the ABT.

In her final decades, Serrano lived in Long Island, New York. She died on January 16, 2023, in Syosset, New York, of complications from Alzheimer's disease.
