= Vernon Fougère =

Joseph Vernon Fougère (May 20, 1943 – June 18, 2013) was a Canadian prelate of the Roman Catholic Church. He was the 12th Bishop of Charlottetown.

Born in Petit-de-Grat, Nova Scotia, Fougère attended Saint Francis Xavier University for his undergraduate education and completed his theological studies at the Grand Séminaire de Montréal where he was awarded a Doctor of Divinity. He was ordained a priest for the Diocese of Antigonish in 1969. Fougère served seven years with the Diocesan Mission in Honduras while still in the priesthood in Nova Scotia.

While in Latin America, Fougère served on the Council of Priests for the Archdiocese of Tegucigalpa and carried out extensive work forming Delegados de la Palabra (Ministers of the Word). Following further education at the Jesuit Theological Union at the University of California, Fougère returned to Nova Scotia where he served in a number of parishes before being appointed Vicar General and Director of Pastoral Services for the Diocese of Antigonish in 1988. Fougère also served as Chair of the Council of Priests for the Diocese of Antigonish and served on the Board of Governors for Saint Francis Xavier University.

On December 11, 1991, Pope John Paul II appointed Father Fougère the twelfth Bishop of Charlottetown. Fougère was consecrated and installed as Bishop of Charlottetown at St. Dunstan's Basilica on March 19, 1992. As Bishop of Charlottetown, Fougère served as a member of the National Council of the Canadian Catholic Organization for Development and Peace and was appointed to the Board of Directors of the Catholic Mission in Canada for the year 2000.

Bishop Fougère resigned his post on July 11, 2009, citing health reasons, becoming Bishop Emeritus. Pope Benedict XVI appointed Bishop Richard Grecco as his replacement. Bishop Fougère died on June 18, 2013, at the Queen Elizabeth Hospital in Charlottetown, Prince Edward Island, aged 70.
