= St. Malachy's Memorial High School =

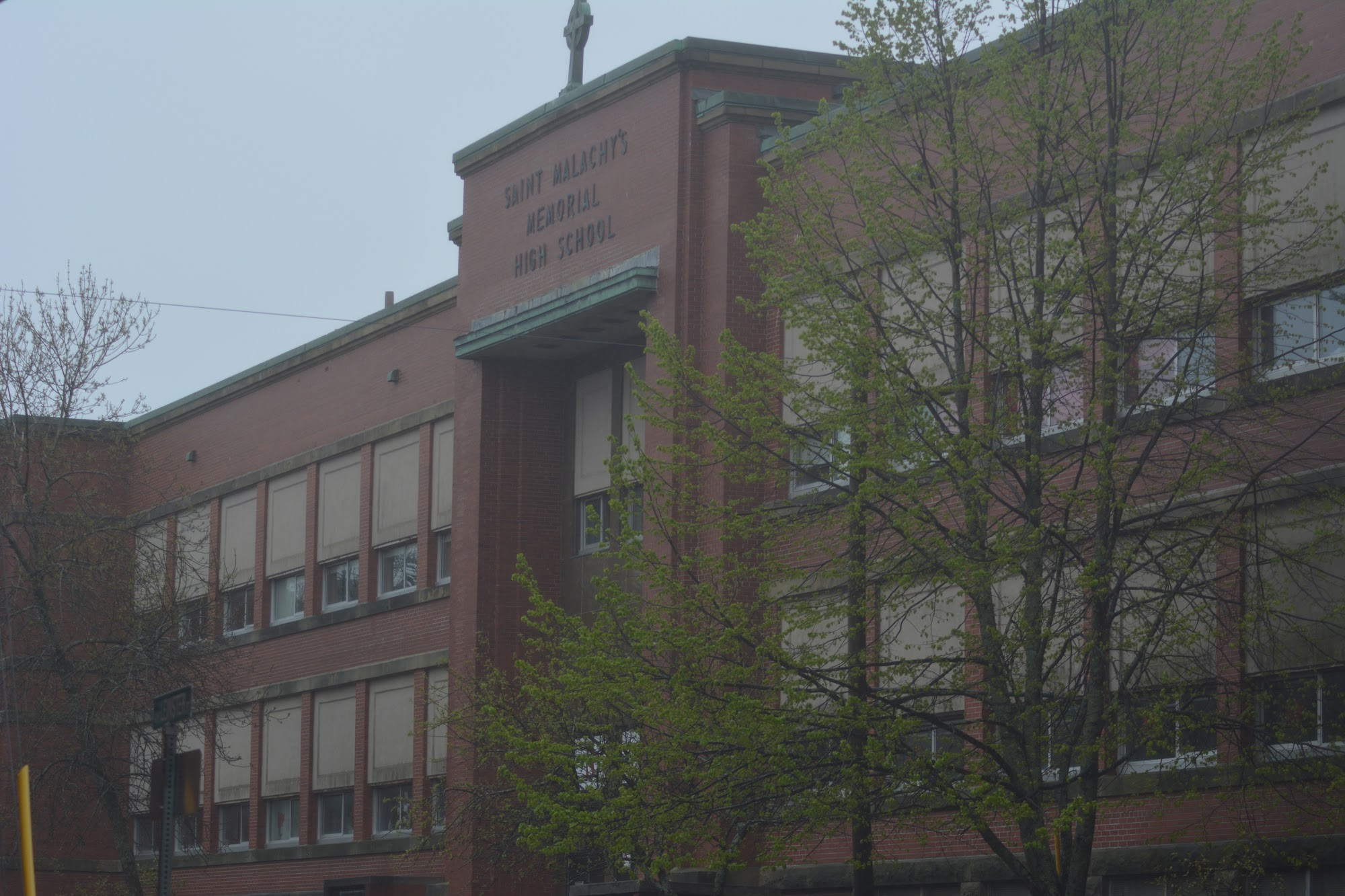

Location
- 2-20 Leinster Street; Saint John, New Brunswick, E2L 1H8; Canada; 45.27295°N 66.05596°W

Information
- School type: High school
- Motto: Esse Quam Videri (To be, rather than to seem)
- Religious affiliation: Roman Catholic
- Founded: 1958; 68 years ago
- Principal: Brad Stevens
- Teaching staff: 60
- Grades: 9-12
- Enrolment: 602 (as of 2017)
- Language: English; French
- Colours: Red and White
- Team name: Saints

== History ==
St. Malachy's High School was established in 1958 as an all boys' Catholic High School. St. Malachy's became the successor school to St. Vincent's High School. St. Vincent's was opened in 1919 as an all boys' Catholic high school located next to the city's Cathedral of the Immaculate Conception. In 1954, St. Vincent's became an all girls' institution.

St. Malachy's was built on the site of Saint John's first Catholic church, St. Malachy's, established in 1814. After a fire, St. Malachy's Hall, a diocesan multipurpose facility, was erected on the site of the old chapel. As the city's population expanded, a need for more schools increased.

St. Malachy's Memorial High School

St. Malachy's Memorial High School became coeducational in 1976. St. Vincent's High School amalgamated with St. Malachy's in the late 1990s; this institution maintained two campuses. In 2002, St. Vincent's High School closed along with its Cliff Street location.

Today, St. Malachy's Memorial High School is owned by the Catholic Diocese of Saint John and leased by the New Brunswick Department of Education. All faculty and staff are provincial employees.

The school's memorial name commemorates members of St. Vincent's alumni killed in the First World War and the Second World War.

== Facilities ==
- 2 Art Rooms
- 1 Culinary Kitchen
- 1 Auditorium
- 2 Audiovisual Rooms
- 1 Biology Lab
- 1 Cafeteria
- 1 Chemistry Lab
- 4 Computer Labs
- Gymnasium
- 2 Music Rooms
- 2 Elevator Lifts
- Guidance Centre
- Resource Centre
- Sexual Health Centre
- 1 Library/Common Room
- 1 Physics Lab
- Student Lounge

== Advanced Placement programmes ==
- AP Biology
- AP Calculus AB
- AP Calculus BC
- AP Comparative Politics
- AP Drawing
- AP English Language
- AP English Literature
- AP European History
- AP French Language and Culture Exam
- AP Physics
- AP Research
- AP Seminar
- AP 2-D Art and Design

== Notable alumni ==
- Ivan Court, 76th mayor of Saint John
- Jonathan Huberdeau, NHL player
- Ryan Jimmo, UFC fighter
- Carl Killen, former Member of the Legislative Assembly of New Brunswick and teacher at the school
- Noël Kinsella (1939-2023), member of the Senate of Canada (1990-2014) and Speaker of the Senate (2006-2014)
- Lyman Ward, Actor
- Paul Zed, former Member of Parliament
- Bruce Melanson, New York Islanders draft pick
- Sam Wakim, Class of 1955, former Member of Parliament
