= Louis James O'Leary =

Louis James O'Leary (August 17, 1877 – July 8, 1930) was the sixth Bishop of the Roman Catholic Diocese of Charlottetown, who also the older brother of his predecessor, Bishop Henry Joseph O'Leary.

== Early life ==
Born in Richibucto, New Brunswick, the son of Henry O'Leary and Mary O'Leary, O'Leary received his higher education from St. Joseph's College in Memramcook before going on to study at the Grand Seminary in Montreal, Quebec. He later travelled to Rome, where he was ordained a priest in 1900 for the Diocese of Chatham in New Brunswick. He later received doctorates in Theology and Canon Law while in Rome.

== Religious life ==
After serving as auxiliary bishop in Chatham since 1914, O'Leary was appointed Bishop of the Diocese of Charlottetown on September 10, 1920, succeeding his younger brother who had been appointed as Archbishop for the Archdiocese of Edmonton.

During his tenure as Bishop, O'Leary continued to focus on projects that had flourished under his brother. St. Dunstan's College was now a university since 1917 and during the 1920s modifications were made to the campus. Also, the Sisters of St. Martha of Prince Edward Island continued to grow and officially became a congregation in 1923. The Sisters took over the tasks of managing the Charlottetown Hospital and St. Vincent's Orphanage after the Grey Nuns of Quebec returned to their native province after 46 years of service on Prince Edward Island.

In 1929, the Diocese of Charlottetown celebrated its 100th anniversary, as well as the founding of the Holy Redeemer Parish in Charlottetown. Also that year, St. Dunstan's Cathedral was elevated to the dignity of a basilica.

== Death ==
Throughout his tenure, Bishop O'Leary never enjoyed great health, spending a great amount of time at the Charlottetown Hospital and hospitals further away, including in Montreal. Following his release from hospital in 1929, the Bishop went for a period of rest at his brother's home in Dayton, Ohio. It is there that he died in 1930. His funeral mass was held at St. Dunstan's Basilica in Charlottetown and was presided over by the late Bishop's brother, Archbishop Henry O'Leary of Edmonton. Bishop Louis O'Leary was buried in the Catholic Cemetery in Charlottetown.

Religious titles
Preceded by Henry Joseph O'Leary	Bishop of the Diocese of Charlottetown; 1920–1930	Succeeded by Joseph Anthony O'Sullivan
