= William Dollar =

American dancer, ballet master, choreographer and teacher

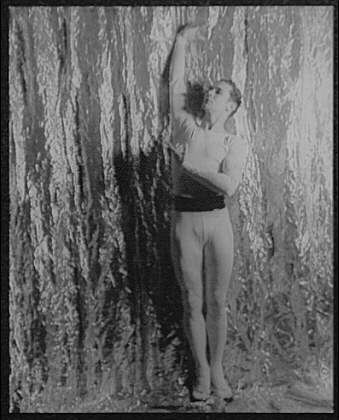
William Dollar in L'Errante (1935) Photo by Carl Van Vechten

William Dollar (April 20, 1907 – February 28, 1986) was an American dancer, ballet master, choreographer, and teacher. As one of the first American danseurs nobles, he performed with numerous companies, including the Philadelphia Opera Ballet, the American Ballet, Ballet Caravan, Ballet Society, Ballet Theatre, and New York City Ballet.

== Early life and training ==
William Henry Dollar, born in St. Louis, Missouri, was raised in East St. Louis, a city just across the Mississippi River in Illinois, where his parents ran a grocery store and meat market. As a boy, Bill Dollar was a student of piano and gymnastics, in which he excelled, and he had a strong interest in studying ballet. His parents tried to discourage him, but he finally won them over and began his dance training in his mid-teens. After a few years with local teachers, he moved east to pursue dance studies with professional teachers. He had studied with Catherine Littlefield in Philadelphia and with Mikhail Mordkin, Alexandre Volinine, and Michel Fokine in New York before he took his first class with George Balanchine at the newly established School of American Ballet in 1934. He was, by then, already an accomplished technician.

== Professional career ==
Dollar was poised to begin a varied career as a dancer, a choreographer, and a teacher. He would find success in all three fields of endeavor and would make a significant contribution to the development of ballet in the United States and abroad.

=== Dancer ===
In 1935, after Balanchine, Lincoln Kirstein, and Edward M.M. Warburg formed the American Ballet, Dollar joined the company as a soloist and was soon dancing principal parts. He appeared in six of the seven ballets, all by Balanchine, in the company's first New York season, presented in March at the Adelphi Theater.

- Serenade. Music: Serenade in C for string orchestra, Op. 48, by Pyotr Ilyich Tchaikovsky, arranged and orchestrated by George Antheil. Role: principal male dancer with an ensemble of seventeen female dancers.
- Alma Mater. Music: a commissioned score by Kay Swift, orchestrated by Morton Gould. Roles: The Villain, opposite Charles Laskey as the Hero and Gisella Caccialanza as the Heroine, and the Janitor, a solo turn. This was Balanchine's first ballet on an American theme to American music. It was a fantasy satire of college life in the 1920s. The Hero was a football player; the Heroine was a flapper; and the Villain wore a coonskin coat.
- Reminiscence. Music by Benjamin Godard, orchestrated by Henry Brant. Role: a pas de trois with Holly Howard and Elise Rieman.
- Transcendence. Music: "Mephisto Waltz" and two Hungarian rhapsodies by Franz Liszt, arranged and orchestrated by George Antheil. Role: The Man in Black, with Elise Rieman as the Young Girl and Charles Laskey as the Young Man. Balanchine created the Mephistophelian role of The Man in Black especially for Dollar.
- L'Errante. Music: The Wanderer, by Franz Schubert. Role: principal male dancer, the Wanderer.
- Dreams. Music a commissioned score by George Antheil. Role: The Acrobat.

In 1937, Balanchine and the American Ballet were hired by Samuel Goldwyn to create dances for a United Artists film entitled The Goldwyn Follies. Released in 1938, the film starred Vera Zorina in two spectacular ballets created by Balanchine: the Romeo and Juliet Ballet, set to music by George Gershwin, and the Water Nymph Ballet, set to music by Vernon Duke. The former includes an amusing mock duel between the Montagues as ballet dancers and the Capulets as tap dancers as well as a romantic pas de deux for the star-crossed lovers. The latter is a surrealist fantasy in which a glamorous Zorina rises, sparkling, out of a pool of water to dance around classical Greek columns and a statue of a giant white horse with a large ensemble of women clad in flowing tutus and men in formal evening wear. Dollar, slender as a reed, is her stalwart partner in both of these cinematographic classics.

The purity of Dollar's classical technique, with clean line, remarkable ballon, and exceptional flexibility made him well suited to roles in earlier works created by Michel Fokine, especially the Poet in Les Sylphides and Harlequin in Le Carnaval, which he performed with Ballet Theatre in its first season in 1940. But it was Balanchine who gave him opportunities for expression in some of his most compelling choreography. In 1937, Dollar created the roles of the Joker in The Card Party and the Bridegroom in Le Baiser de la Fée, both set to music by Igor Stravinsky. In 1941 he partnered Marie-Jeanne in Ballet Imperial, set to Tchaikovsky's Piano Concerto No. 2, and in Concerto Barocco, set to Bach's Double Violin Concerto in D minor. In 1946 he created the role of the Black Cat in The Spellbound Child, a lyric fantasy set to Maurice Ravel's L'Enfant et les Sortileges. Also in 1946 came perhaps the most memorable role that he ever created for Balanchine. In the first movement of The Four Temperaments, set to a commissioned score by Paul Hindemith, Balanchine used Dollar's pliant, arching back to remarkable effect in the Melancholic variation, dramatically extending the expressive range of the classical ballet vocabulary.

Dollar also appeared in numerous opera ballets choreographed by Balanchine from 1935 to 1942. Among them were Aïda, Mignon, La Juive, The Bartered Bride, The Bat, The Fair at Sorochinsk, The Queen of Spades, and Macbeth. His most memorable role on the opera stage was in Balanchine's production of Gluck's Orpheus and Eurydice in May 1936. Presented by the American Ballet Ensemble at the Metropolitan Opera House, it featured singers in the orchestra pit and dancers on the stage in corresponding roles. Lew Christensen danced the role of Orpheus; Daphne Vane was Eurydice; and Dollar appeared as Amor, the beautiful winged god of love. Images from this remarkable production were captured in photographs by George Platt Lynes and have often been published and reproduced.

=== Choreographer ===
In March 1936, Dollar made his first choreographic work, for the American Ballet Ensemble at the Metropolitan Opera House. In collaboration with Balanchine, he created Concerto, later called Classic Ballet, to Frédéric Chopin's Piano Concerto No. 2 in F minor, Op. 21. He set the opening and closing sections: Maestoso, a pas de six featuring Gisella Caccialanza, and Allegro Vivace, for Leda Anchutina, Lew Christensen, and corps de ballet. Balanchine set the middle section, Larghetto, as a pas de trois for Dollar, Holly Howard, and Charles Laskey. Dollar restaged this work in 1944 as Constantia for Ballet International, a short-lived company created in New York by the Marquis de Cuevas. The story and the choreography are tinged with the fervor of Chopin's feeling for the Polish soprano Konstancja Gladkowska (1810-1889), with whom he had fallen in love in his youth. Having dedicated the Larghetto movement to the memory of Constantia, Dollar danced the male lead opposite Marie-Jeanne and Yvonne Patterson. In 1950, he staged the work for Ballet Theatre, where it remained a popular item in the repertory for several years.

Dollar's best-known work, The Duel, was mounted in 1949 as Le Combat for Roland Petit's Ballets de Paris. Based on an episode in Torquato Tasso's epic poem Jerusalem Delivered (1581) and set to a score by Raffaelo de Banfield, the ballet tells a tale of tragic love from the time of the Crusades, recounting the legend of mortal combat between Tancredi, a Christian knight of Normandy, and Clorinda, a Saracen maiden disguised in male armor. At first the ballet was only an extended pas de deux, danced by Janine Charrat and Vladimir Skouratoff, but Dollar added three more knights for dramatic effect when he staged the work for the New York City Ballet in 1950. There, Melissa Hayden made a powerful impression as Clorinda, dancing with Jacques d'Amboise as Tancredi. In 1953, Dollar also staged the work for Ballet Theatre, where Lupe Serrano and John Kriza made the roles their own.

Dollar created numerous other choreographic works for various companies. Among them are the following:

- 1936. Promenade, set to Maurice Ravel's Valse Nobles et Sentimentales, for Ballet Caravan.
- 1939. A Thousand Times Neigh, a tribute to the automobile, created for American Ballet Caravan at the Ford pavilion at the 1939 New York World's Fair at Flushing Meadows.
- 1943. The Five Boons of Life, later called The Five Gifts, set to music by Ernō Dohnányi, for the American Concert Ballet.
- 1949. Ondine, set to "The Seasons" by Antonio Vivaldi, for the New York City Ballet. Original cast: Tanaquil Le Clercq, Francisco Moncion, Melissa Hayden, and Yvonne Mounsey.
- 1950. Jeux, set to music by Claude Debussy, for Ballet Theatre.
- 1954. Concerto, set to music by Felix Mendelssohn, for Ballet Theatre Workshop. Danced by students of the Ballet Theatre School.
- 1958. The Parliament of the Birds, set to music by Ottorino Resphighi, for Ballet Theatre Workshop. Danced by students of the Ballet Theatre School.

=== Teacher ===
For more than forty years, Dollar was a highly regarded ballet teacher, working at times for the American Concert Ballet and the Ballet Theatre School. In the 1940s he was ballet master at the American Concert Ballet and at Ballet Society. He also lived and worked abroad. He served as ballet master of the Grand Ballet de Monte Carlo and as guest choreographer for companies in Brazil and Japan In 1958 he assisted in establishing the Iranian National Ballet Company in Tehran, serving as the first resident choreographer as well as the principal teacher in the school.

== Later years ==
After being stricken with arthritis of the hips in the 1950s, Dollar was forced to curtail his dancing. His last appearance on stage was as Herr Drosselemeyer in Balanchine's famous production of The Nutcracker for the New York City Ballet. Thereafter, he retired to his home in Flourtown, Pennsylvania, where he passed his last years in the care of his wife, the former Yvonne Patterson, a vivacious dancer and teacher whom he had first met in Ballet Caravan in the late 1930s. He died of lung cancer at home in March 1986, aged 79 years.
