= Robert Harris (bishop) =

Canadian Catholic bishop (born 1944)

- Bishop Emeritus of Saint John, New Brunswick
- Church: Catholic Church
- Diocese: Diocese of Saint John, New Brunswick
- In office: 8 May 2007 – 15 October 2019
- Predecessor: Joseph Faber MacDonald
- Successor: Christian Riesbeck
- Previous posts: Titular Bishop of Trofimiana (2002-2007); Auxiliary Bishop of Sault Sainte Marie, Ontario (2002-2007)

Orders
- Ordination: 24 May 1969
- Consecration: 12 December 2002 by Jean-Louis Plouffe

Personal details
- Born: 26 September 1944 (age 82) Montreal, Quebec, Canada, British Empire

Robert Harris (born 24 September 1944) is a Canadian Catholic bishop. Since 2007 he has served as the head of the Roman Catholic Diocese of Saint John, New Brunswick. Harris is pastor of the Cathedral of the Immaculate Conception in Saint John, New Brunswick. He resigned in 2019 when he reached the mandatory retirement age of 75 years.

Born in Montreal, Quebec, he was ordained a priest in 1969. From 2002 to 2007, he was the Auxiliary Bishop of Sault Ste. Marie. In 2007, he was installed as the twelfth Bishop of Roman Catholic Diocese of Saint John, New Brunswick. As bishop, he was the chancellor of St. Thomas University in Fredericton, New Brunswick. The diocese's liberal arts university.
