= James Charles McDonald =

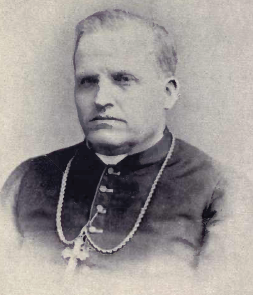
James Charles McDonald

James Charles McDonald (June 14, 1840 – December 1, 1912) was a Roman Catholic bishop who served as fourth Bishop of the Roman Catholic Diocese of Charlottetown.

== Biography ==
Born at Allisary in St. Andrews, Prince Edward Island, McDonald received his education from the Central Academy in Charlottetown and taught in a number of Island schools for many years. Following the completion of his studies at Charlottetown's St. Dunstan's College, McDonald travelled to the Grand Seminary of Montreal and was ordained in 1873.

McDonald taught briefly at St. Dunstan's College and was a pastor in Kings County for nine years. Later, McDonald would be named Rector of St. Dunstan's, a position he held for seven years.

In 1891, following the death of Bishop Peter McIntyre, McDonald automatically succeeded, after serving as Coadjutor bishop since 1890.

Bishop McDonald's tenure was seen as a period of growth for the Diocese of Charlottetown. Many new churches were built throughout Prince Edward Island, St. Dunstan's College became affiliated with Université Laval in Quebec City in 1892, and the Notre-Dame Convent for Girls flourished.

In 1896, construction began on the new St. Dunstan's Basilica (the one before the present basilica that stands today). The new basilica was built out of stone and considered one of the most magnificent churches east of Quebec.

In 1908, after many years of service, McDonald's health began to fail, and he was left an invalid. At this time, Father James Morrison, Vicar General of the Diocese, stepped in to take care of diocesan administration.

Bishop McDonald died at his Charlottetown residence in 1912 and his funeral took place at St. Dunstan's Basilica. In 2000, his remains were interred in his native home of St. Andrew's.

Religious titles
Preceded by Peter McIntyre	Bishop of the Diocese of Charlottetown; 1891–1912	Succeeded by Henry Joseph O'Leary
