= Joseph Edward Troy =

Canadian Catholic bishop (1931–2023)

His Excellency Joseph Edward Troy
- Bishop Emeritus of Saint John
- Metropolis: Moncton
- Installed: 2 April 1986
- Term ended: 24 September 1997
- Predecessor: Arthur Joseph Gilbert
- Successor: Joseph Faber MacDonald
- Previous post: Coadjutor Bishop of Saint John (1984–1986)

Orders
- Ordination: 28 May 1959
- Consecration: 22 May 1984 by Arthur Joseph Gilbert

Personal details
- Born: 3 September 1931 Chatham, Miramichi, New Brunswick, Canada
- Died: 12 March 2023 (aged 91) Saint John, New Brunswick, Canada

Joseph Edward Troy (3 September 1931 – 12 March 2023) was a Canadian Roman Catholic prelate. He was coadjutor bishop (1984–1986) and bishop (1986–1997) of Saint John, New Brunswick.

Catholic Church titles
Preceded by Arthur Joseph Gilbert	Bishop of Saint John; 1986–1997	Succeeded by Joseph Faber MacDonald
