= Joseph Anthony O'Sullivan =

Joseph Anthony O'Sullivan (November 29, 1886 – June 6, 1972) was a Canadian prelate of the Catholic Church. He served as Bishop of Charlottetown (1931–44) and Archbishop of Kingston (1944–66).

== Biography ==
Joseph O'Sullivan was born in Hamilton, Ontario, to Joseph and Catherine (née Fogarty) O'Sullivan. He received his early education at St. Mary's School in his native city, and then attended St. Jerome's College in Kitchener from 1903 to 1908. He studied philosophy and theology at the Grand Seminary of Montreal in Quebec from 1908 to 1911.

He was ordained to the priesthood by Bishop Thomas J. Dowling on August 5, 1911. He was first appointed to St. Mary's Cathedral in Hamilton, where he served as a curate for ten years. From 1921 to 1925, he served as chancellor of the diocese and rector of the cathedral. He was named a domestic prelate in 1923, and became rector of St. Augustine's Seminary in Toronto in 1925.

On February 6, 1931, O'Sullivan was appointed Bishop of Charlottetown in Prince Edward Island by Pope Pius XI. He received his episcopal consecration on the following May 7 from Archbishop Andrea Cassulo. In 1932, he began radio broadcasts of his Lenten sermons and the Christmas midnight Masses. He also encouraged Eucharistic Congresses, established the Confraternity of Christian Doctrine, and presided over several developments of St. Dunstan's University.

He was appointed Archbishop of Kingston in Ontario on February 26, 1944. He attended all four sessions of the 1962-1965 Second Vatican Council. He both retired as archbishop of Kingston and was named Titular Archbishop of Maraguia by Pope Paul VI on December 14, 1966; he resigned this title on November 23, 1970.

O'Sullivan died at age 85, and is buried at Holy Sepulchre Cemetery in Hamilton.

Preceded by Louis James O'Leary	Bishop of Charlottetown; 1931–1944	Succeeded by James Boyle
Preceded by Richard Michael Joseph O'Brien	Archbishop of Kingston; 1944–1966	Succeeded by Joseph Lawrence Wilhelm
