= Richard Grecco =

The Most Reverend Richard John Grecco
- Bishop of Charlottetown
- Church: Roman Catholic Church
- See: Charlottetown
- In office: 11 July 2009 – 4 March 2021
- Predecessor: Vernon Fougère
- Successor: Joseph Dabrowski
- Previous posts: Auxiliary Bishop of London (1998-2002); Auxiliary Bishop of Toronto (2002-2009)

Orders
- Ordination: 2 September 1973
- Consecration: 2 February 1998 by Thomas Benjamin Fulton

Personal details
- Born: March 4, 1946 (age 80) Thorold, Ontario
- Motto: Hope in The Lord
- Coat of arms: Richard John Grecco's coat of arms

Styles of Richard John Grecco
- Reference style: The Most Reverend
- Spoken style: Your Excellency
- Religious style: Bishop

Richard John Grecco (born 4 March 1946) is a Canadian prelate of the Roman Catholic Church. He was the 13th Bishop of Charlottetown from 2009 to 2021.

== Biography ==
Born in Thorold, Ontario to Anthony and Lily Grecco, Richard Grecco attended St. Augustine's Seminary, Toronto and was ordained to the priesthood on 2 September 1973. He furthered his studies at the Pontifical Gregorian University, Rome and the University of St. Michael's College, Toronto, from where he obtained a doctorate in theology in 1982. He served as a parish priest and a professor of moral theology at St. Michael's College, Toronto and St. Joseph's College, Edmonton.

On 5 December 1997, Grecco was appointed Auxiliary Bishop of London, Ontario and Titular Bishop of Uccula by Pope John Paul II. He received his episcopal consecration on 2 February 1998 from Bishop Thomas Fulton, with Bishops John O'Mara and John Sherlock serving as co-consecrators. He selected as his episcopal motto "Hope in the Lord".

Grecco was named Auxiliary Bishop of Toronto on 27 April 2002. In Toronto, he served as the senior vicar general and the episcopal vicar of the Central Pastoral Region and Scarborough, composed of approximately 98 parishes. He also worked with many lay associations and ethnic communities in the Toronto Archdiocese, and served on numerous boards and committees including the National Executive for Development and Peace and the Pontifical Mission Society.

On 11 July 2009, Pope Benedict XVI appointed Grecco the thirteenth Bishop of Charlottetown, Prince Edward Island. He succeeded Vernon Fougère, who retired due to poor health after a 17-year-long tenure. As Bishop, he was the spiritual leader of 63,240 Catholics in Prince Edward Island.

On March 4, 2021, his 75th birthday, he resigned as the Bishop of Charlottetown having reached the retirement age set by canon law.

Pope Francis appointed Bishop Joseph Dabrowski as Grecco's successor, 2 April 2023.

== See also ==
Catholic Church titles
Preceded by Vernon Fougère	Bishop of Charlottetown; 2009–2021	Succeeded by Joseph Dabrowski
Preceded by Gilles Bélisle	Titular Bishop of Uccula; 1997–2009	Succeeded by Robertus Gerardus Leonia Maria Mutsaerts
Preceded by –	Auxiliary Bishop of Toronto; 2002–2009	Succeeded by –
Preceded by Frederick Henry	Auxiliary Bishop of London; 1997–2002	Succeeded by Robert Anthony Daniels
