= John Sweeny (bishop) =

Irish-born Canadian Roman Catholic priest

- Bishop of Saint John in New Brunswick
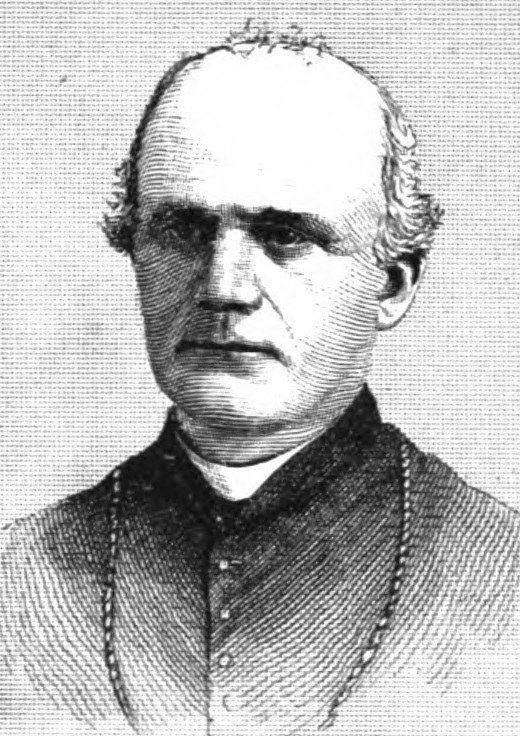
- Diocese: Saint John
- Installed: November 9, 1859
- Term ended: March 25, 1901
- Predecessor: Thomas-Louis Connolly
- Successor: Timothy Casey

Orders
- Ordination: September 1, 1844

Personal details
- Born: May 6, 1821 Clones, Ireland
- Died: March 25, 1901 (aged 79) Saint John, New Brunswick

John Sweeny (May 6, 1821 – March 25, 1901) was an Irish born, Canadian Roman Catholic priest and Bishop of Saint John in New Brunswick from 1859 to 1901.

John Sweeny was born in Clones, County Monaghan, Ireland in 1821, the son of James Sweeny and Mary McGuire. He was ordained a priest, for Fredericton (St. John), New Brunswick in 1844.

Bishop Sweeny was a leading figure in opposition to the Common Schools Act of 1871 enacted by the 22nd New Brunswick Legislative Assembly. He founded the Irish Catholic community of Johnville, New Brunswick.
