= James Drummond MacGregor =

Canadian Presbyterian minister and abolitionist (1759–1830)

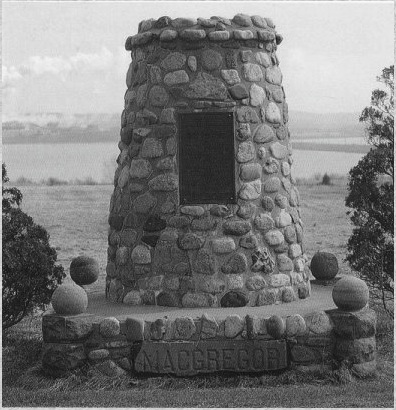
Rev James Macgregor Monument, Pictou, Nova Scotia

Rev. James Drummond MacGregor (Scottish Gaelic: an t-Urr. Seumas MacGriogar) (December 1759 – 3 March 1830) was an author of Christian poetry in both Scottish and Canadian Gaelic, an abolitionist and Presbyterian minister in Nova Scotia, Canada.

== Life and career ==
MacGregor was a prolific author of Gaelic poetry, reflecting a wealth of inherited oral tradition, particularly relating to Clan MacGregor of Perthshire.

Upon his arrival in 1786, Rev. MacGregor was the first Gaelic-speaking Presbyterian minister in Nova Scotia, which was then experiencing a high rate of immigration from the Scottish Highlands and Islands.

Influenced by the Scottish Enlightenment, MacGregor published Letter to a Clergyman Urging him to set free a Black Girl he held in Slavery in Halifax, Nova Scotia (1788). According to historian Barry Cahill, this document "is the earliest and most outstanding production of white antislavery literature in Canada." Historian Alan Wilson describes the document as "a landmark on the road to personal freedom in province and country." Finally, historian Robin Winks writes it is "the sharpest attack to come from a Canadian pen even into the 1840s; he had also brought about a public debate which soon reached the courts."

In the essay, MacGregor writes, "But if they be members of the body of Christ, does not he account them precious as himself? Are they not one spirit with the Lord, of his flesh and his bones?" He also purchased slaves' freedom.

In the port of Pictou, Nova Scotia, Rev. MacGregor was known to be quite aggressive in his efforts to convert fellow Gaels from Roman Catholicism to Presbyterianism. That is why, in 1791, Fr. Angus Bernard MacEachern travelled from Prince Edward Island and urged the first large group of Catholic immigrants from the Scottish Gaeldom to leave Pictou and settle among their co-religionists in Antigonish County and on Cape Breton Island.

In 1819, Rev. MacGregor published a book of Christian poetry in Canadian Gaelic, but as there was no Gaelic printing press in Atlantic Canada, the poetry collection had to be published in Glasgow.

According to literary scholar Effie Rankin, "As would be expected, his works were mostly of a religious nature, including translations of Psalms and also some original hymns which appeared in print in 1819. A well-educated cleric would presumably have had sufficient means and connections to achieve publication, but an individual anthology was not an option for most poets of the time."

MacGregor was also supporter of education reform in Nova Scotia, and was mentor and compatriot of radical education reformer, Dr. Thomas McCulloch, founder of the ecumenical Pictou Academy and first principal of Dalhousie University.

Rev. MacGregor died in Pictou, Nova Scotia, at age 71.

== See also ==
- Decline of Slavery in Nova Scotia
- History of Nova Scotia
- Slavery in Canada
- Canadian Gaelic
