= Henry O'Leary =

Canadian politician

Henry O'Leary (May 13, 1832 – November 7, 1897) was an Irish-born businessman and political figure in New Brunswick, Canada. He represented Kent County in the Legislative Assembly of New Brunswick from 1873 to 1878.

He was born in Castledown in County Cork, the son of Theophilus O'Leary and Ellen Power. O'Leary came to North America in 1852, settling in Richibucto three years later. He married Mary Ann Brittain. In 1859, he bought a store and a wharf there. In 1864, he purchased land nearby where he built a canning plant for lobster and salmon. O'Leary acquired additional canneries until he had at least 30 in New Brunswick and several in Prince Edward Island. He exported his products to England and the United States. He also owned sawmills and was involved in shipbuilding. He was first elected to the provincial assembly in an 1873 by-election held after the death of William Shand Caie. As a Roman Catholic, he opposed the 1871 Common Schools Act and lobbied to have the act repealed. In 1875, he married Mary O'Leary after the death of his first wife. O'Leary ran unsuccessfully for a seat in the Canadian House of Commons in 1878. He died in Dorchester at the age of 65.

After his death, control of the business passed to his sons Richard and Frederick. His son Henry Joseph became an archbishop and his son Louis James became a bishop in the Catholic Church. His daughter Christina married George Valentine McInerney.
