= Angus Bernard MacEachern =

The Right Reverend Angus Bernard MacEachern
- Bishop of Charlottetown
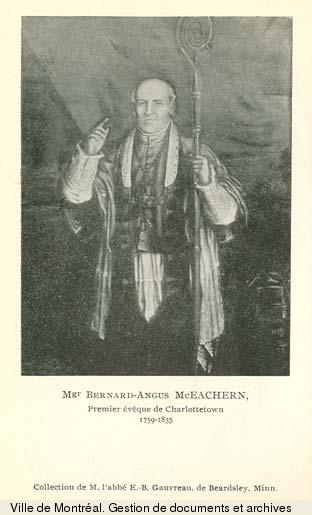
- Church: Roman Catholic Church
- Archdiocese: Archdiocese of Québec
- Diocese: Diocese of Charlottetown
- Installed: August 11, 1829
- Term ended: April 22, 1835
- Predecessor: Inaugural holder (First bishop)
- Successor: Bernard Donald McDonald

Personal details
- Born: February 8, 1759 Kinlochmoidart, Scotland
- Died: April 22, 1835 (aged 76) Canavoy, Prince Edward Island
- Denomination: Roman Catholic Church

Angus Bernard MacEachern (February 8, 1759 – April 22, 1835) was a Scottish bishop in the Roman Catholic Church who rose to become the first bishop of the newly formed Diocese of Charlottetown following its separation from the Archdiocese of Quebec on August 11, 1829.

== Biography ==
MacEachern was born in Kinlochmoidart, Scotland, Lochaber, the son of Hugh Bàn MacEachern and Mary MacDonald. He became a protégé of Bishop Hugh MacDonald, vicar apostolic of the Highland District for the underground Catholic Church in Scotland, and, when his family emigrated to Prince Edward Island in 1772, 13-year-old Angus stayed behind to study for the Roman Catholic priesthood at the clandestine minor seminary at Buorblach near Morar. His major seminary training continued at the Royal Scots College in Spain, as education was then denied Catholics throughout the British Empire, and, in particular, training for the priesthood, was expressly forbidden by the Penal Laws on pain of the death penalty, until Catholic emancipation in 1829. Fr. MacEachern arrived on Prince Edward Island, then a British colony in North America known as St. John's Island, in 1790 as a young missionary, joining his emigrant family. Fr. MacEachern, who would later be recognized as firmly placing Catholic roots in the colony as well as throughout the Maritimes, travelled endlessly in the area as a priest. He was fluent in English, French, and Gaelic, therefore permitting him to minister to a variety of different cultures in the region.

In the port of Pictou, Nova Scotia, Presbyterian minister and Canadian Gaelic poet James Drummond MacGregor was known to be quite aggressive in his efforts to convert his fellow Gaels from Roman Catholicism to Presbyterianism. That is why in 1791, Fr. MacEachern travelled from Prince Edward Island and urged the first large group of Catholic immigrants from the Scottish Gaeldom to leave Pictou County and settle among their co-religionists in Antigonish County and on Cape Breton Island.

In 1816, while serving as priest in Charlottetown, MacEachern was advised by a visiting bishop from Quebec to build a church in the city and dedicate it to St. Dunstan, the Archbishop of Canterbury. The church was the first of several that would occupy the lot where the present cathedral stands today.

In 1819, MacEachern became Vicar General for most of the Maritimes as well as becoming a bishop, and by the 1820s he was convinced that the only way to renew the area's religious beliefs was independence from the neglectful Archdiocese of Quebec. MacEachern finally got his wish when the Diocese of Charlottetown, comprising Prince Edward Island, New Brunswick, and the Magdalen Islands was created in 1829, with MacEachern appointed as its first bishop.

On 30 November 1831, MacEachern founded St. Andrew's College. Located in his large home in St. Andrew's, PEI, the first Catholic College in the Atlantic provinces offered preliminary training for seminarians.

Much loved by his people, Bishop MacEachern died in 1835 in Canavoy, Prince Edward Island. His funeral took place in St. Andrew's Church, with burial in the church basement. His remains now lie in the crypt of a nearby chapel.

Religious titles
| Preceded by Diocese created | Bishop of the Diocese of Charlottetown; 1829–1835 | Succeeded by Bernard Donald McDonald |
