= Divo Zadi =

Italian priest and theologian (1931–2021)

- Bishop of Civita Castellana
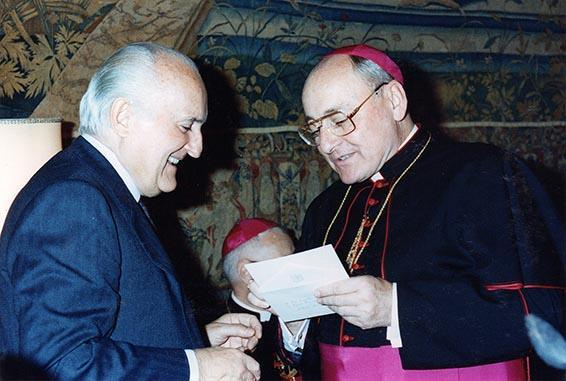
- Msgr. Divo Zadi (right) and President of Italy Oscar Luigi Scalfaro, 24 November 1992
- Church: Catholic Church
- Diocese: Diocese of Civita Castellana
- In office: 10 March 1989 – 10 December 2007
- Predecessor: Marcello Rosina
- Successor: Romano Rossi

Orders
- Ordination: 2 August 1953
- Consecration: 8 April 1989 by Agostino Casaroli

Personal details
- Born: 25 January 1931 Montefollonico, Province of Siena, Kingdom of Italy
- Died: 1 April 2021 (aged 90) Civita Castellana, Lazio, Italy

Divo Zadi (25 January 1931 – 1 April 2021) was an Italian Roman Catholic bishop.

Zadi was born in Italy and was ordained to the priesthood in 1953. He served as bishop of the Roman Catholic Diocese of Civita Castellana, Italy, from 1989 to 2007.
