= Waterloo Village, Saint John =

City region in Canada

Waterloo Village
- Neighbourhood
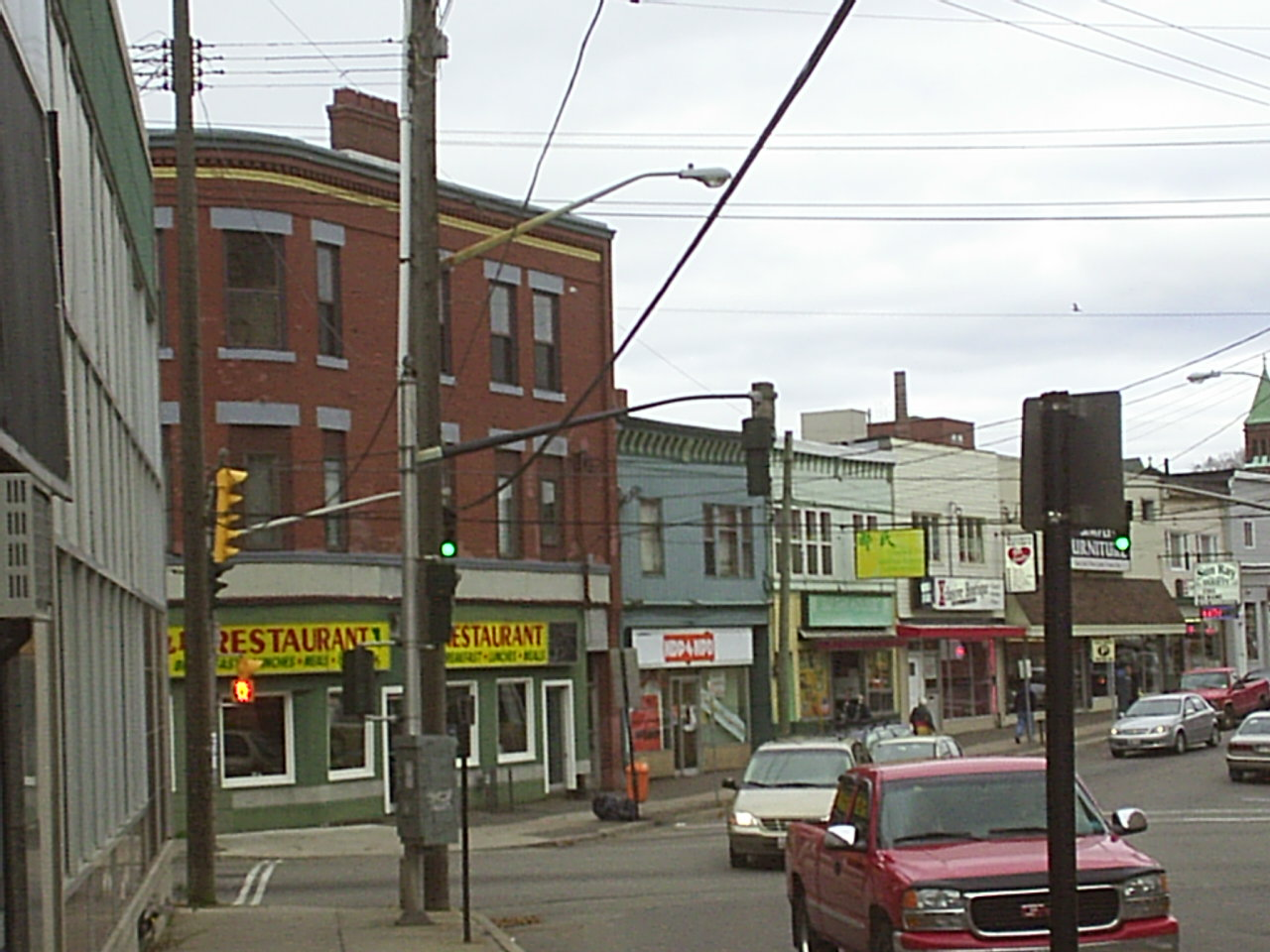
- Waterloo Street, the area in which Waterloo Village is located in, in 2004
- Interactive map of Waterloo Village
- Location within New Brunswick
- Coordinates: 45°16′45″N 66°3′19″W
- Country: Canada
- Province: New Brunswick
- City: Saint John
- Telephone Exchanges: 506 428

Waterloo Village is a neighbourhood within the city of Saint John, New Brunswick, Canada. The neighbourhood has been categorized as being a poorer part of Saint John, with a 2008 report indicating a poverty rate of 61.5%.

== History ==
The Waterloo Village area was home to the Saint John General Hospital before its closure. Ronald J. Yaschuk of the Telegraph-Journal wrote that the neighbourhood entered a state of decline following its closure, adding that "the provincial government had no plan for the neighbourhood".

In 2008, the Vibrant Communities and the Human Development Council reported that Waterloo Village had a poverty rate of 61.5%, a two-year increase from 56.1%. Wendy MacDermott, the coordinator of Vibrant Communities, indicated Waterloo Village being "sort of a drive-through neighbourhood" as potentially being part of the issue. At the time, the area was also known for having a presence of prostitution. Later that year, Waterloo Village was one of five "priority neighbourhoods" in the city which received funding from premier Shawn Graham.

Between 2021 and 2024, city officials reported an increase in calls for service to the neighbourhood, prompting Saint John Police to increase foot patrols.
