= William Dollard =

- Saint John in America
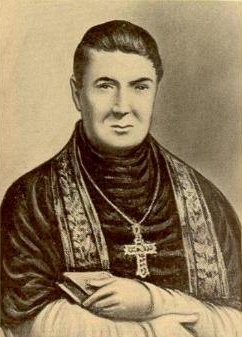
- Diocese: Saint John, New Brunswick
- Installed: September 30, 1842
- Term ended: August 20, 1851
- Predecessor: Diocese erected September 30, 1842
- Successor: Thomas-Louis Connolly

Orders
- Ordination: October 12, 1817
- Consecration: June 11, 1843

Personal details
- Born: November 29, 1789 (baptized) Ballytarina, County Kilkenny, United Kingdom of Great Britain and Ireland
- Died: August 29, 1851 (aged 61) Fredericton, New Brunswick
- Buried: Hermitage Cemetery
- Denomination: Roman Catholic
- Education: St Kieran's College, Kilkenny

William Dollard (baptised 29 November 1789 – 29 August 1851) was an Irish born Canadian Roman Catholic priest and Bishop of Saint John in America, New Brunswick from 1842 to 1851. William was born in County Kilkenny, Ireland, to Michael Dollard and Anastasia Dunphy. He studied in St Kieran's College, Kilkenny, and completed his theological training in Canada.
