= Peter McIntyre (bishop) =

Canadian religious figure (1818–1881)

The Right Reverend Peter McIntyre
- Bishop of Charlottetown
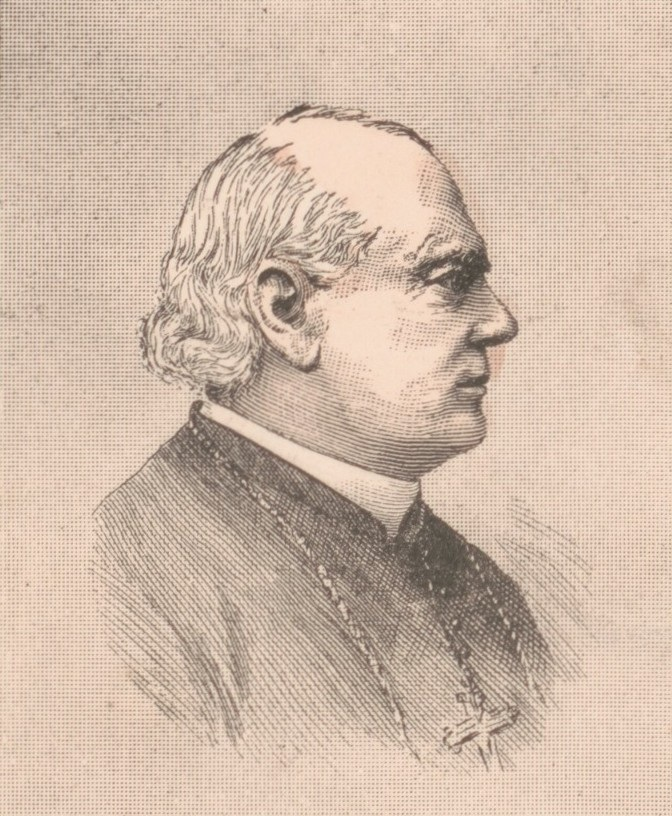
- Church: Roman Catholic Church
- Archdiocese: Archdiocese of Québec
- Diocese: Diocese of Charlottetown
- Elected: May 8, 1860
- Installed: August 15, 1860
- Term ended: April 30, 1891
- Predecessor: Bernard Donald Macdonald
- Successor: James Charles McDonald

Personal details
- Born: June 29, 1818 Cable Head, Prince Edward Island
- Died: April 30, 1891 (aged 72) Antigonish, Nova Scotia
- Buried: St. Peters Bay, Prince Edward Island
- Denomination: Roman Catholic Church

Peter McIntyre (June 29, 1818 – April 30, 1891) was the third bishop of the Roman Catholic Diocese of Charlottetown, succeeding Bishop Bernard Donald McDonald.

== Biography ==
=== Early life ===
Born in Cable Head, St. Peter's Bay, Prince Edward Island, Peter McIntyre was the son of Scottish immigrants who arrived on the Island in 1788. He received his early education from St. Andrew's College on P.E.I., before being sent to study at the College of St. Hyacinthe, followed later by a theological course at the Seminary of Quebec.

Ordained a priest in 1843, McIntyre served in a number of parishes, including in Quebec and his native Prince Edward Island. On the island, he was assigned to Tignish, where he is recognized as having built one of the finest churches in Canada. He served seventeen years in Tignish before he was appointed as Bishop of Charlottetown on May 8, 1860 and was consecrated August 15 of the same year at St. Dunstan's Basilica.

=== Bishop of Charlottetown ===
His first issue as bishop was the anti-Catholic rhetoric that had been published in a number of Island media. However, it appeared that the issue ultimately disappeared, and harmony was reinstated. Additionally, Bishop McIntyre established himself as the first diocesan bishop to live in Charlottetown, where the "palace" was constructed in 1875. The basilica and other clergy continue to reside at the residence.

In the field of education, McIntyre established many churches and schools in the diocese, including a convent in the Magdalen Islands. He was also responsible for erecting St. Patrick's School for Boys next to St. Dunstan's Basilica, and followed in the footsteps of his predecessor Bernard Donald McDonald by bringing Sisters of Notre Dame to teach on Prince Edward Island.

In 1869, McIntyre was one of many who attended the First Vatican Council in Rome. Later, he toured parts of Europe and Asia. In 1878, the bishop was a key figure in the establishment of the Charlottetown Hospital, the first hospital in the city which was open to people of any religious background. McIntyre was also instrumental in establishing the Catholic Total Abstinence Union which spread through the diocese during the 1870s to help prevent the danger of alcohol consumption.

Bishop Peter McIntyre died in 1891 at the bishop's house in Antigonish after serving as head of the Diocese of Charlottetown for thirty-one years. His funeral was held at St. Dunstan's Basilica and his remains were taken by train to his native parish of St. Peter's Bay to be interred in the basement beneath the church altar.

Religious titles
Preceded by Bernard Donald McDonald	Bishop of the Diocese of Charlottetown; 1860–1891	Succeeded by James Charles McDonald
