= Joseph Faber MacDonald =

- Bishop of Saint John, New Brunswick
- Church: Catholic Church
- Diocese: Diocese of Saint John, New Brunswick
- In office: August 23, 1998 – September 9, 2006
- Predecessor: Joseph Edward Troy
- Successor: Robert Harris
- Previous post: Bishop of Grand Falls (1980-1998)

Orders
- Ordination: March 9, 1963
- Consecration: March 19, 1980 by Angelo Palmas

Personal details
- Born: January 20, 1932 Little Pond, Prince Edward Island, Dominion of Canada, British Empire
- Died: February 17, 2012 (aged 80) Charlottetown, Prince Edward Island, Canada

Joseph Faber MacDonald (born 1932 in Little Pond – died 2012 in Charlottetown) was a Canadian clergyman and prelate for the Roman Catholic Diocese of Grand Falls. He was appointed bishop in 1980 in Grand Falls, and then 1998 in Saint John. He died in 2012.
