= Wysoka Strzyżowska =

- Village
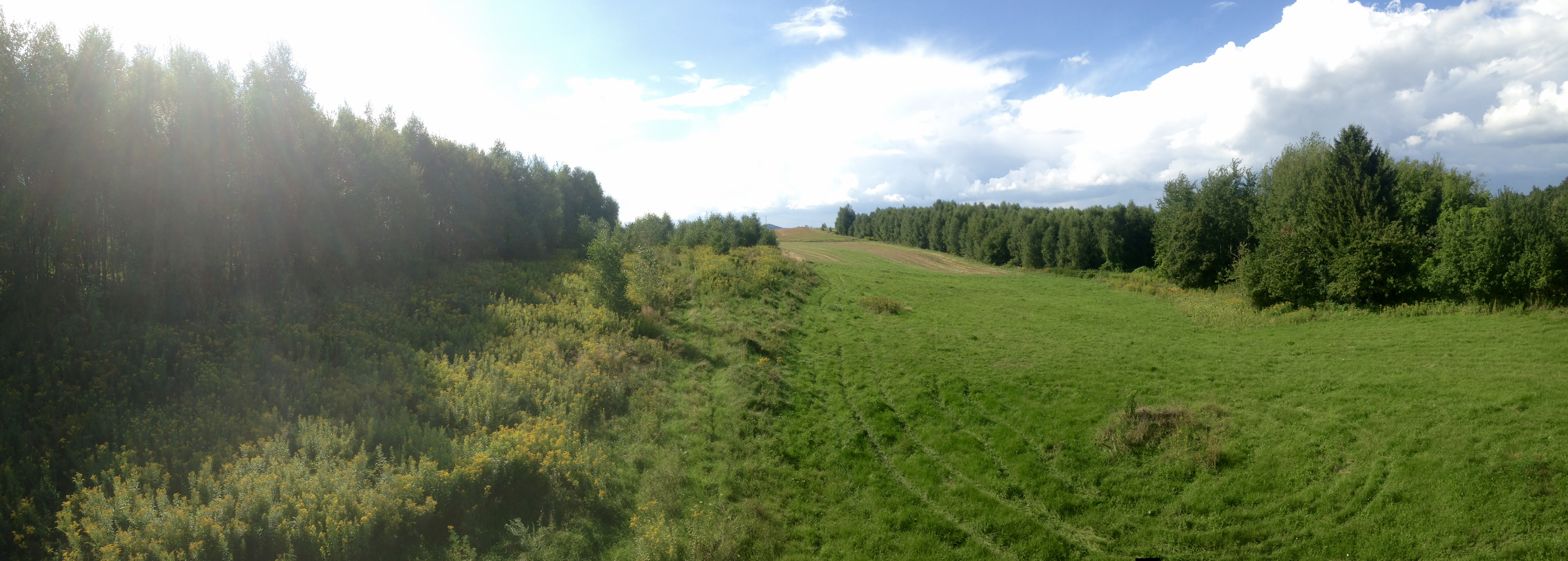

- Location within Poland
- Coordinates: 49°50′N 21°45′E
- Country: Poland
- Voivodeship: Subcarpathian
- County: Strzyżów
- Gmina: Strzyżów
- Population: 2,021

Wysoka Strzyżowska [vɨˈsɔka stʂɨˈʐɔfska] is the largest village in the administrative district of Gmina Strzyżów, within Strzyżów County, Subcarpathian Voivodeship, in south-eastern Poland.

== History ==
The village was first mentioned in 1277, in a document published by Bolesław Wstydliwy. He writes about the existence of the village of Wysoka in this area, which consisted of four villages of the time: Grodeczna, Golczowska Wola (today's Golcówka), Zielonczyna Wola (later called Kołomyja, then Połomia and finally Michałówka) and Stodolina Wola (today's Stodolina). The four remained separate villages until the mid-19th century, when they were merged and renamed Wysoka Strzyżowska.

== Demographics ==
At the latest 2021 consensus Wysoka Strzyżowska had a population of 2,021, this is a decrease of -3.72% from 2011, as the population was 2,099.
