= Cathedral of the Immaculate Conception (Saint John, New Brunswick) =

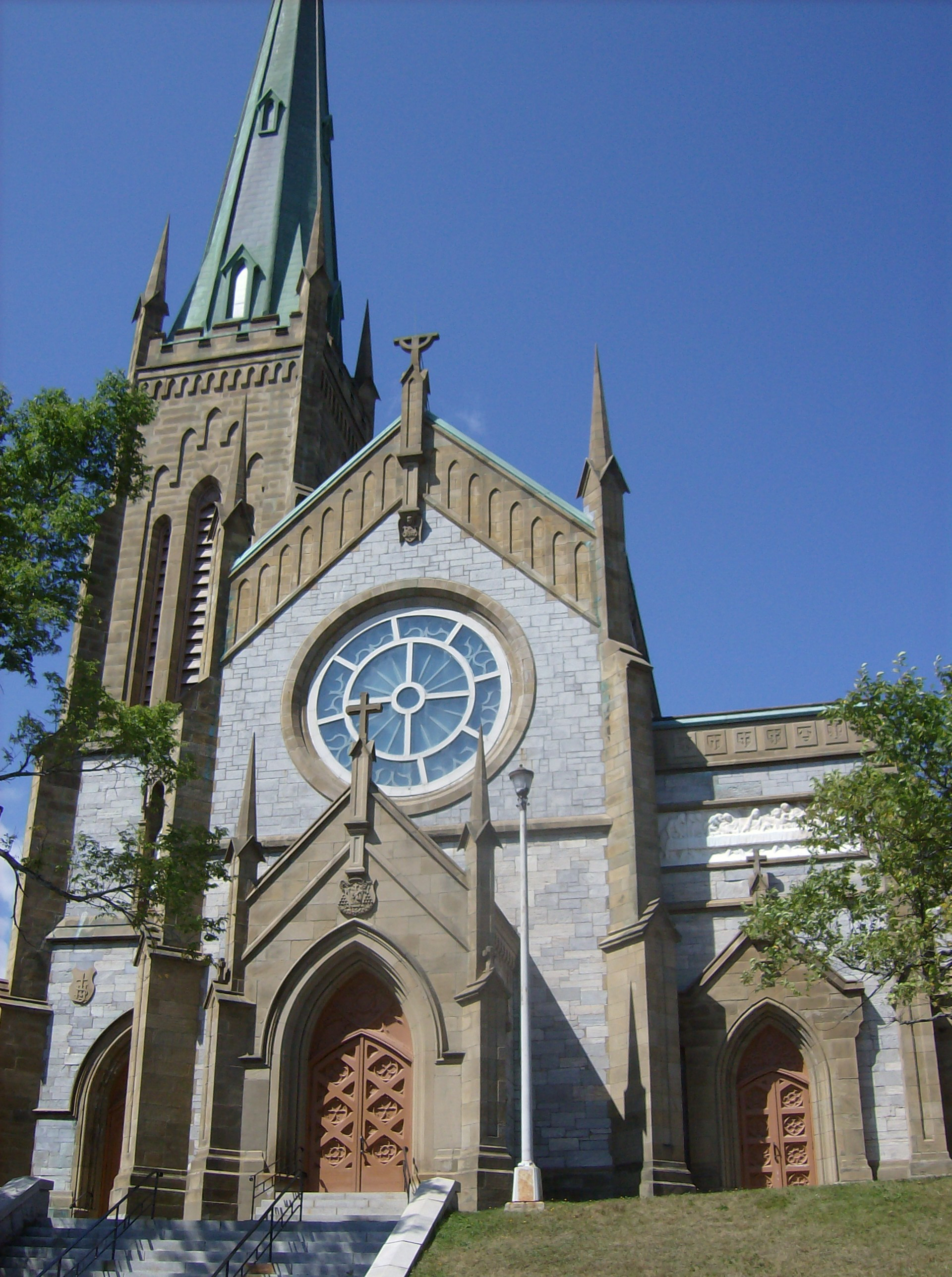
- Cathedral of the Immaculate Conception from Waterloo Street
- Cathedral of the Immaculate Conception
- 45.2783°N 66.0564°W
- Location: Saint John, New Brunswick
- Country: Canada
- Denomination: Roman Catholic
- Website: https://www.immaculateconception.ca

History
- Status: Cathedral
- Founder: Most Rev. Thomas Connolly
- Dedicated: 1855
- Consecrated: July 16th, 1885

Architecture
- Functional status: Active
- Heritage designation: Provincial Heritage Place
- Architect: Matthew Stead
- Architectural type: Norman-Gothic
- Groundbreaking: May 1853

Specifications
- Length: 200 ft (61 m)
- Width: 116 ft (35 m)

Administration
- Diocese: Diocese of Saint John

Clergy
- Bishop: Most Rev. Christian Riesbeck, CC
- Rector: Rev. Ralph McRae, EV
- Vicar(s): Rev. Daren Bryk, CC
- Priest(s): Rev. Ralph McRae, EV; Rev. Daren Bryk, CC

The Cathedral of the Immaculate Conception in Saint John, New Brunswick, Canada is a cathedral of the Diocese of Saint John located at 91 Waterloo Street in the city's central neighbourhood of Waterloo Village.

The Cathedral is a prominent example of Gothic Revival architecture. Designed by architect Matthew Stead and officially completed in 1885. The Cathedral features a tall spire, detailed stonework, and stained glass windows typical of its style. It remains the mother church of the Roman Catholic Diocese of Saint John and continues to function as an active place of worship and a historic landmark in the city.

== History ==
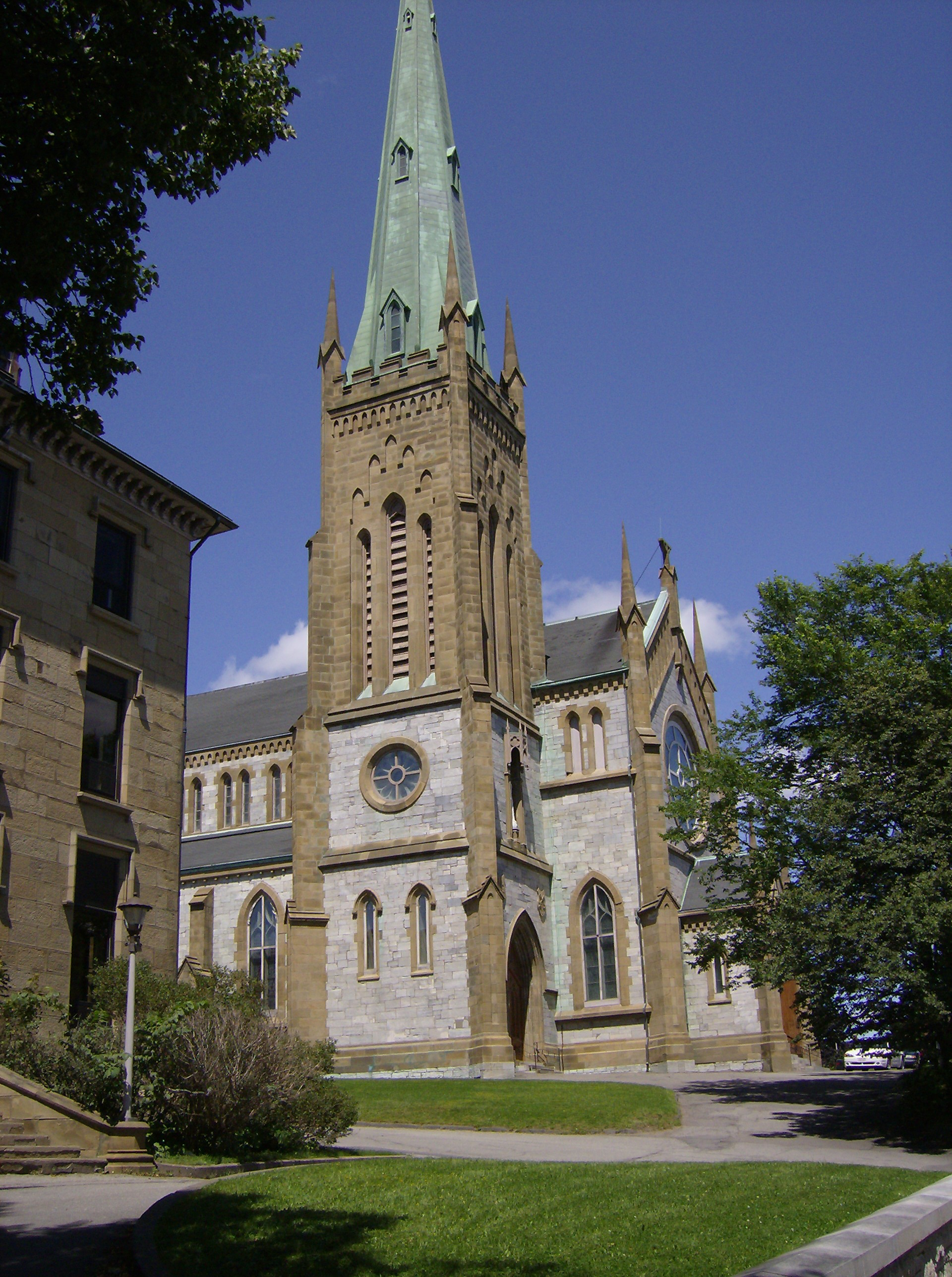
The cathedral spire was completed in 1871

The Cathedral of the Immaculate Conception and Bishop's Palace are designated for their historical and religious associations with the city's Irish Catholic community, who had historically been marginalized for many years in the city. Between 1845 and 1847 alone, approximately 30,000 Irish arrived in Saint John, more than doubling the population of the city.

Bishop Thomas-Louis Connolly had arrived in Saint John in 1852 and needed to make a place of worship which would accommodate the large Irish Catholic population. The building was initiated by the second bishop of New Brunswick, The Most Rev. Thomas Connolly. Realizing that the Catholic population required a larger facility, Bishop Connolly on November 14, 1852, announced to the congregation his intention to proceed immediately with the erection of the cathedral. Plans were subsequently prepared in New York City during the winter of 1852–53, the foundation stone was laid in May 1853 and walls were erected, with the roof built by November 1853. The blessing and first mass in the new cathedral were celebrated on Christmas Day.

Three thousand people were present for the first Christmas Mass in 1855 when Bishop Connolly dedicated the cathedral, and in 1885, the completed cathedral was consecrated with great fanfare. In 1860 Bishop John Sweeney was consecrated and he set out to complete the work. The chapel, chancel, and entrances were finished in 1861, in which year the adjacent Bishop's Palace was also built.

In 1871 the cathedral's spire, which reaches 270 feet above sea level, was completed and is believed to have subsequently served as a navigational aid for vessels entering the harbour.

== Design ==
The task of completing the cathedral fell to Bishop J. Sweeney, the third Bishop of New Brunswick between 1861 and 1865. The spire was erected in 1871. It has a height of 230 feet to the top of the cross, equal to some 300 feet above sea level and about the highest point in the city. In the interior of the edifice the extreme length is 200 feet, the width at the transepts 116 feet and in the nave, 80 feet.

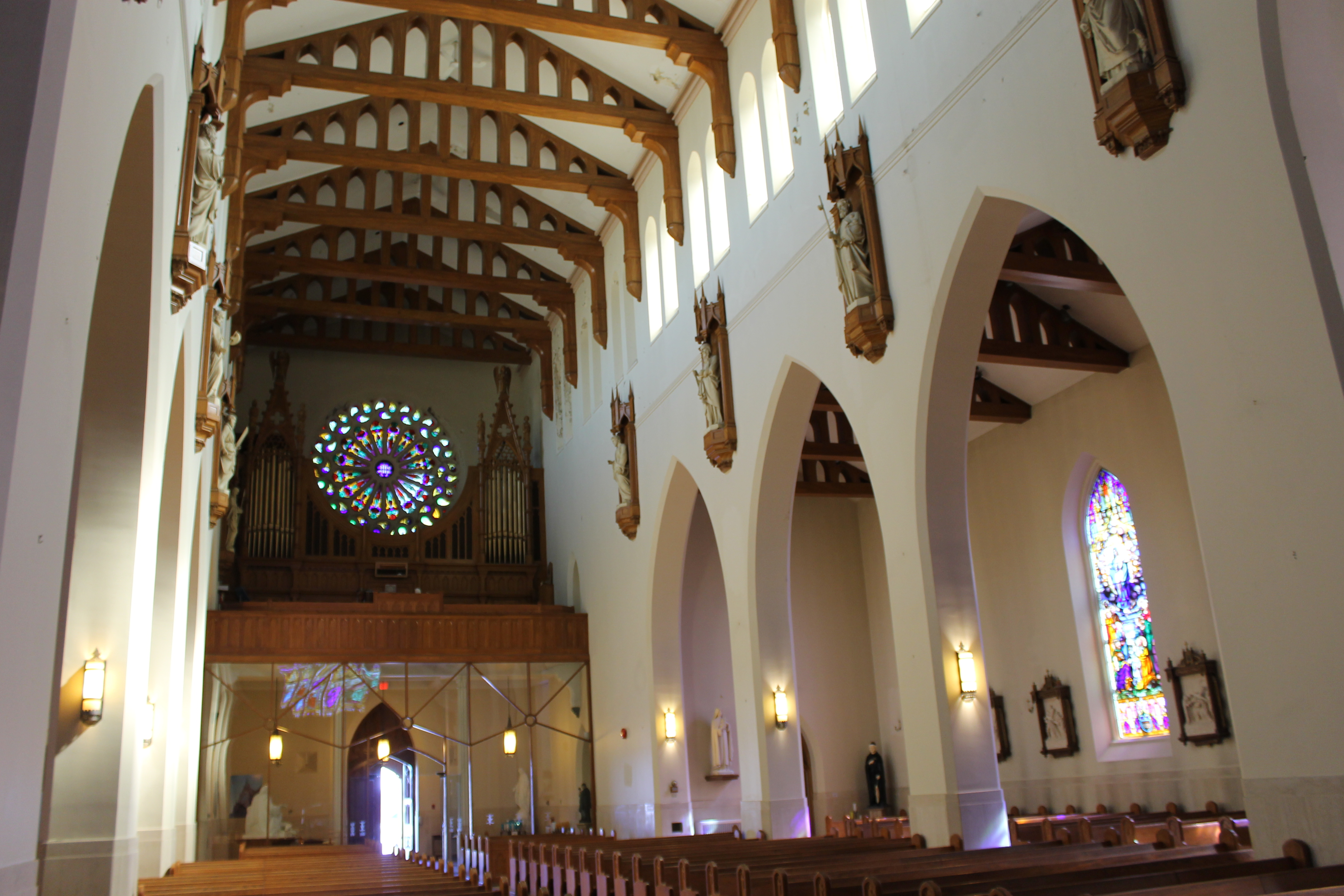
A pipe organ is installed in the gallery atop the entrance

The cathedral chimes, installed in 1885, were first rung on that Christmas Day and consist of ten bells, the largest about 3,000 pounds in weight. The bells were part of a larger set cast in 1884 especially for the World's Industrial and Centennial Cotton Exposition at New Orleans, where they were awarded a gold medal. The chime is in the scale of D major, and includes a flat seventh bell, which will permit music in two different keys and forms. The whole chime weighs 12,000 pounds, exclusive of mountings. They were manufactured by the McShane Bell Foundry, Baltimore, Maryland.

The organ, one of the largest in Saint John, was built by Casavant Frères of St. Hyacinthe, Quebec in 1952. It consists of a three manual console, which controls four divisions (Great, Swell, Choir and Pedal). There are some 3,000 pipes, the largest of which is 16 feet, the shortest less than one inch. Over the altar is the life-size image of the crucified Saviour. A statue of Our Lady of Immaculate Conception, Patroness of the cathedral is set up in a Gothic shrine offsetting the pulpit of similar design on the opposite pillar.

== See also ==
- Roman Catholicism in Canada
