= Bernard Donald Macdonald =

Catholic bishop

The Right Reverend Bernard Donald McDonald
- Bishop of Charlottetown
- Church: Roman Catholic Church
- Archdiocese: Archdiocese of Québec
- Diocese: Diocese of Charlottetown
- Elected: February 21, 1837
- Installed: October 15, 1837
- Term ended: December 30, 1859
- Predecessor: Bernard Angus MacEachern
- Successor: Peter McIntyre

Personal details
- Born: December 25, 1797 St. Andrew's, Prince Edward Island
- Died: December 30, 1859 (aged 62)
- Denomination: Roman Catholic Church

Bernard Donald Macdonald (December 25, 1797 – December 30, 1859) was the second bishop of the Roman Catholic Diocese of Charlottetown, succeeding Bishop Bernard Angus MacEachern.

== Early life and education ==
Born in St. Andrew's, Prince Edward Island, McDonald was one of the first two boys from the Island sent to study for the priesthood at the Grand Seminary of Quebec in 1812, and was ordained there on June 1, 1822, the first native Islander to become a priest.

== Career ==
McDonald carried out many years of missionary work. He was then appointed Bishop of the Diocese Charlottetown, then comprising Prince Edward Island, New Brunswick, and the Magdalen Islands, on February 21, 1837. During his tenure in 1842, New Brunswick broke away to become its own diocese.

Throughout his tenure as Bishop of Charlottetown, McDonald resided in Rustico, where he had also lived as a missionary. A church dedicated to St. Augustine was built there in 1838 under McDonald's supervision and served its purpose for many years. There is still a St. Augustine's Church in Rustico today.

In 1843, the second basilica for St. Dunstan's was built out of wood while McDonald was bishop. Realizing that the welfare of his priests in the Diocese was important, Bishop McDonald founded the St. Bernard's Society, which would provide for the care of the priests who became inactive due to old age, illness, or other reasons. This society was active until the 1960s.

Although the Bishop closed St. Andrew's College in 1844, he supervised the construction of St. Dunstan's College in Charlottetown (now part of the UPEI campus) in 1848, which attended to the educational needs of boys and girls. In 1856 he spoke out against compulsory bible reading in the public schools.

In 1857, McDonald was also responsible for bringing to the Island the first Sisters of Notre Dame and opening a convent school for girls, which is now the modern-day Notre Dame Convent in Charlottetown.

Ill for some time, McDonald moved from Rustico to St. Dunstan's College shortly before his death. Following his death on December 30, 1859, a large funeral mass was held in Charlottetown, and the Bishop's remains were interred in his native home of St. Andrew's.

== See also ==
Catholic Church titles
Preceded by Bernard Angus MacEachern	Bishop of the Diocese of Charlottetown; 1837–1859	Succeeded by Peter McIntyre
