= Diocese of Saint John, New Brunswick =

Catholic ecclesiastical territory

Diocese of Saint John in New Brunswick Dioecesis Sancti Ioannis Canadensis Diocèse de Saint-Jean au Nouveau-Brunswick

catholic
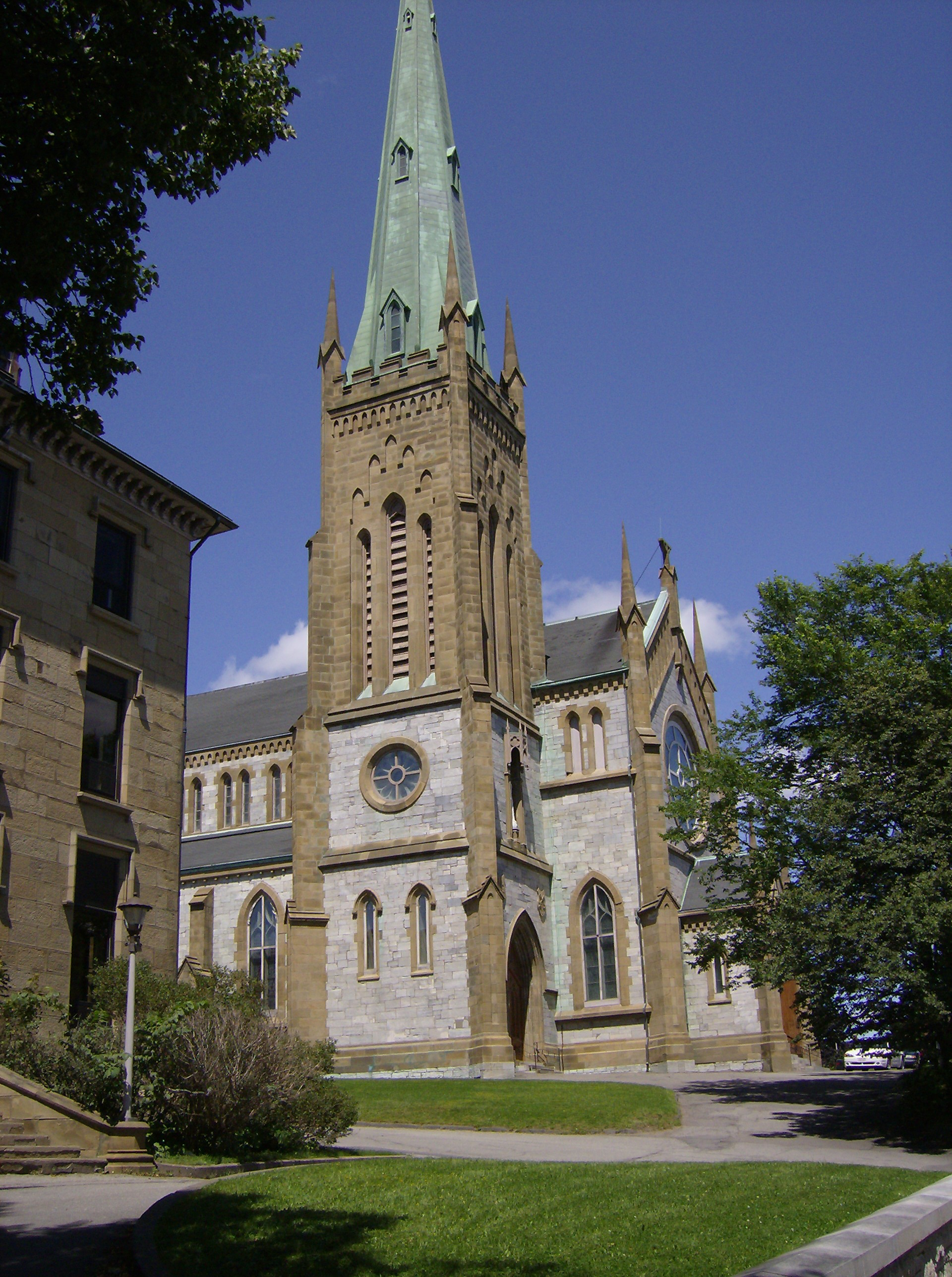
- Cathedral of the Immaculate Conception

- Coat of arms

Location
- Country: Canada
- Ecclesiastical province: Moncton
- Headquarters: Saint John, New Brunswick
- Coordinates: 45°16′48″N 66°03′25″W

Statistics
- Area: 60,000 km^{2} (23,000 sq mi)
- Population: Total; Catholics: (as of 2020); 331,800; 132,600 (40.0%)
- Parishes: 58

Information
- Denomination: Roman Catholic
- Rite: Roman Rite
- Established: September 30, 1842; 183 years ago
- Cathedral: Cathedral of the Immaculate Conception
- Patron saints: Our Lady of the Immaculate Conception, Saint Patrick
- Secular priests: 60

Current leadership
- Pope: Leo XIV
- Bishop: Christian Riesbeck
- Bishops emeritus: Robert Harris

Website
- www.dioceseofsaintjohn.org

The Roman Catholic Diocese of Saint John, New Brunswick (Latin: Dioecesis Sancti Ioannis Canadensis) (erected 30 September 1842, as the Diocese of Saint John in America) is a suffragan of the Archdiocese of Moncton. It was renamed on 15 November 1924 to the Diocese of Saint John, New Brunswick. The Diocese had been a suffragan of the Archdiocese of Halifax–Yarmouth from 1852 to 1936, when it was transferred to the newly erected Archdiocese of Moncton. The Archdiocese of Moncton was established to reflect New Brunswick Catholic's population and linguistic diversity.

== Bishops ==
=== Ordinaries ===
- William Dollard (1842–1851)
- Thomas Louis Connolly, O.F.M.Cap. (1852–1859), appointed Archbishop of Halifax, Nova Scotia
- John Sweeny (1859–1901)
- Timothy Casey (1901–1912), appointed Archbishop of Vancouver, British Columbia
- Edward Alfred Le Blanc (1912–1935)
- Patrick Albert Bray, C.I.M. (1936–1953)
- Alfred Bertram Leverman (1953–1968)
- Joseph Neil MacNeil (1969–1973), appointed Archbishop of Edmonton, Alberta
- Arthur Joseph Gilbert (1974–1986)
- Joseph Edward Troy (1986–1997)
- Joseph Faber MacDonald, C.S.C. (1998–2006)
- Martin William Currie (2006–2007)
- Robert Harris (2007–2019)
- Christian Riesbeck, CC (2019-)

=== Coadjutor bishops ===
- Timothy Casey (1899–1901)
- Joseph Edward Troy (1984–1986)

=== Other priest of this diocese who became bishop ===
- William Mark Duke, appointed Coadjutor Archbishop of Vancouver, British Columbia in 1928

== Territorial losses ==
| Year | Along with | To form |
|---|---|---|
| 1860 | | Diocese of Chatham |
| 1936 | Diocese of Chatham | Archdiocese of Moncton |
