= St. Dunstan's Basilica =

- St. Dunstan's Cathedral Basilica
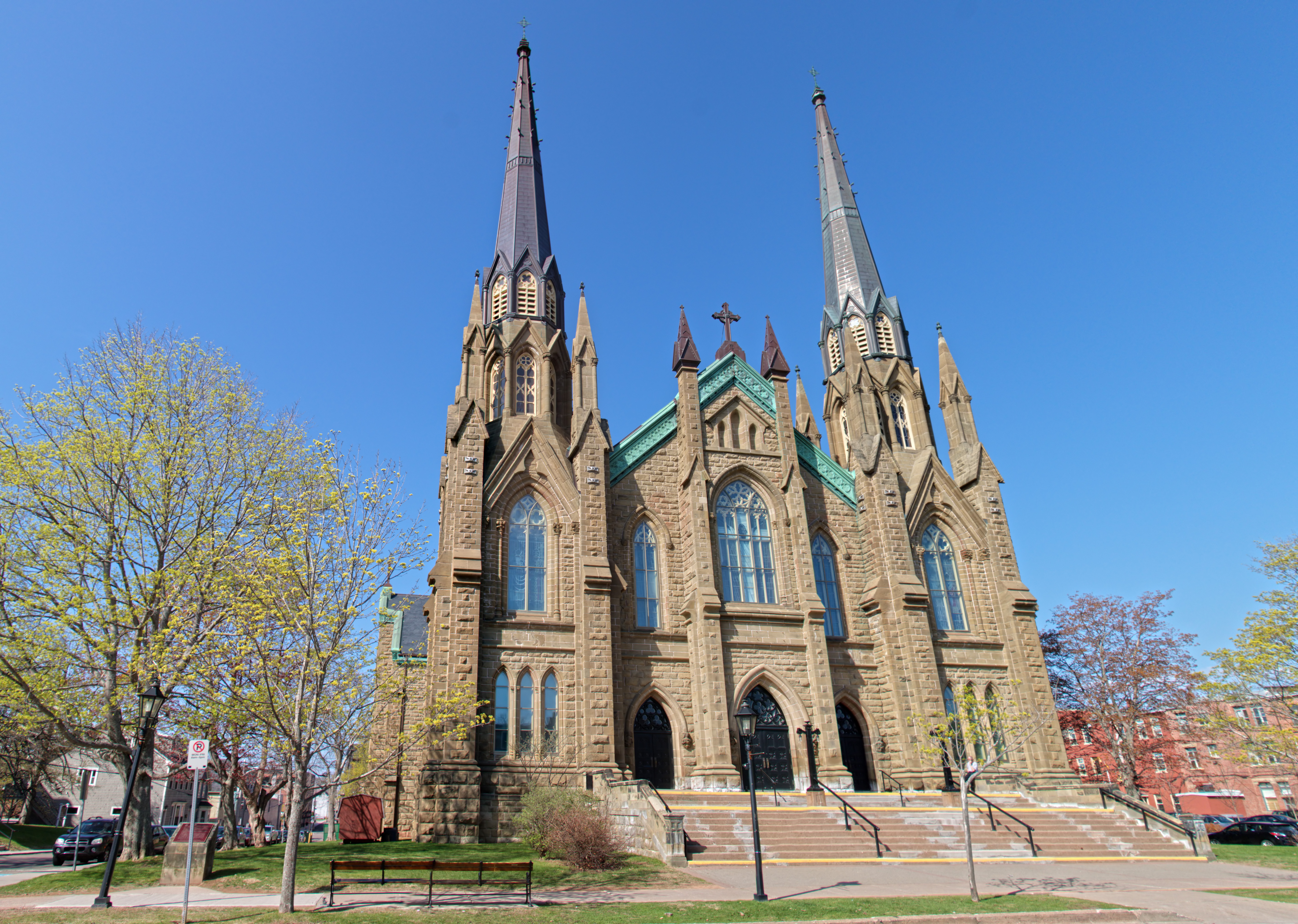
- St. Dunstan's Basilica
- 46.2336°N 63.1254°W
- Location: 45 Great George Street; Charlottetown, Prince Edward Island; C1A 4K1
- Country: Canada
- Denomination: Catholic Church
- Website: stdunstanspei.com/

Architecture
- Architect: François-Xavier Berlinguet
- Groundbreaking: 1896, 1913 (reconstruction after fire)
- Completed: 1907

Administration
- Archdiocese: Diocese of Charlottetown

National Historic Site of Canada
- Official name: St. Dunstan's Roman Catholic Cathedral / Basilica National Historic Site of Canada
- Designated: 1990

The Basilica of Saint Dustan is the cathedral of the Diocese of Charlottetown in Charlottetown, Prince Edward Island, Canada. It is named for St. Dunstan, the Anglo Saxon saint from Glastonbury. The structure is located at 45 Great George Street, between the harbour and the Confederation Centre of the Arts.

Pope Pius XI raised the shrine to the status of Minor Basilica via the decree Edocet Nos Carolinopolitanus on 14 June 1929. The decree was signed and notarized by Cardinal Pietro Gasparri.

== History ==
The original St. Dunstan's Cathedral was built from 1897 to 1907. The present stone structure was built between 1913 and 1919 after a fire destroyed the original cathedral in 1913. It was built in the Gothic Revival architectural style.

In 1929, ten years after its completion, the church was blessed by Pope Pius XI as a basilica. The church remains one of the 27 basilicas in Canada.

In October 1980 it was the site of a state funeral when Prime Minister Pierre Elliot Trudeau gave the eulogy during the funeral for Veterans Affairs Minister Daniel J. MacDonald (M.P. Cardigan). The basilica was designated as a National Historic Site of Canada in 1990.
