= Yvan Mathieu =

Canadian Catholic bishop (born 1961)

The Most Reverend Yvan Mathieu S.M.
- Auxiliary bishop of Ottawa–Cornwall; Titular bishop of Vazari
- Church: Latin Church
- Diocese: Ottawa–Cornwall
- Appointed: 17 March 2022
- Previous post: Provincial superior of the Canada East Province of the Society of Mary (2019–2022)

Orders
- Ordination: 15 August 1987
- Consecration: 13 June 2022 by Marcel Damphousse

Personal details
- Born: Yvan Mathieu; 7 March 1961 (age 65) Quebec City, Quebec, Canada
- Denomination: Catholic
- Coat of arms

Yvan Mathieu S.M. (born 7 March 1961) is a Canadian Roman Catholic auxiliary bishop for the Archdiocese of Ottawa–Cornwall and the titular bishop of Vazari. Prior to being appointed auxiliary bishop Mathieu served as the provincial superior of the Canada East Province of the Society of Mary.

== Early life and education ==
Mathieu was born in Quebec City in 1961 and attended the Séminaire des Pères Maristes, a private high school in Sillery run by the Marist Fathers.

Following his novitiate with the Marists in Washington, D.C., Mathieu gave his religious vows at the age of 19. He went on to attend Saint Paul University in Ottawa where he earned a bachelor's degree in theology in 1983 and a licentiate in fine arts in 1984. Following his ordination to the priesthood in 1987, Mathieu studied at the Pontifical Biblical Institute in Rome and obtained a licentiate in sacred scripture in 1993. He then returned to Saint Paul University and obatained a doctorate in biblical studies in 2000.

== Priesthood ==
While serving as a priest, Mathieu was a teacher and pastoral agent at the Séminaire des Pères Maristes, a collaborator at Saint Clare of Assisi parish in Quebec, head of assistance to the poor for Maison Revivre and co-animator of the La Relève Movement. As an academic, he worked as a lecturer at Saint Paul University and became dean of the Faculty of Theology. He also served as the provincial superior of the Marist Fathers in the Canada East Province.

He is a member of the Society of Biblical Literature.

== Bishop ==
On March 17, 2022, Pope Francis appointed Mathieu as auxiliary bishop of the Archdiocese of Ottawa-Cornwall and titular bishop of the see of Vazari.

=== Coat of arms ===
Bishop Mathieu's coat of arms contains the classic green galero with six tassels and a processional cross which are almost always included in a bishop's coat of arms. It also prominently features two scrolls representing the Old and New Testaments in references to his work as a biblical scholar. The blue on the shield represents the Blessed Virgin Mary and references his membership in the Society of Mary. The gold in the centre represents divinity, and the three stars represent Mary, the Nativity, and the Epiphany, as well as the Holy Trinity.

The Latin motto "NOLI TIMERE" translates to "Do not be afraid." This phrase is meant to evoke the biblical passages in which Joseph is told to take Mary as his wife (Matthew 1:20, Luke 1:30) and Peter is called to join Jesus' ministry (Luke 5:10).
