= St Patrick's Basilica (Ottawa) =

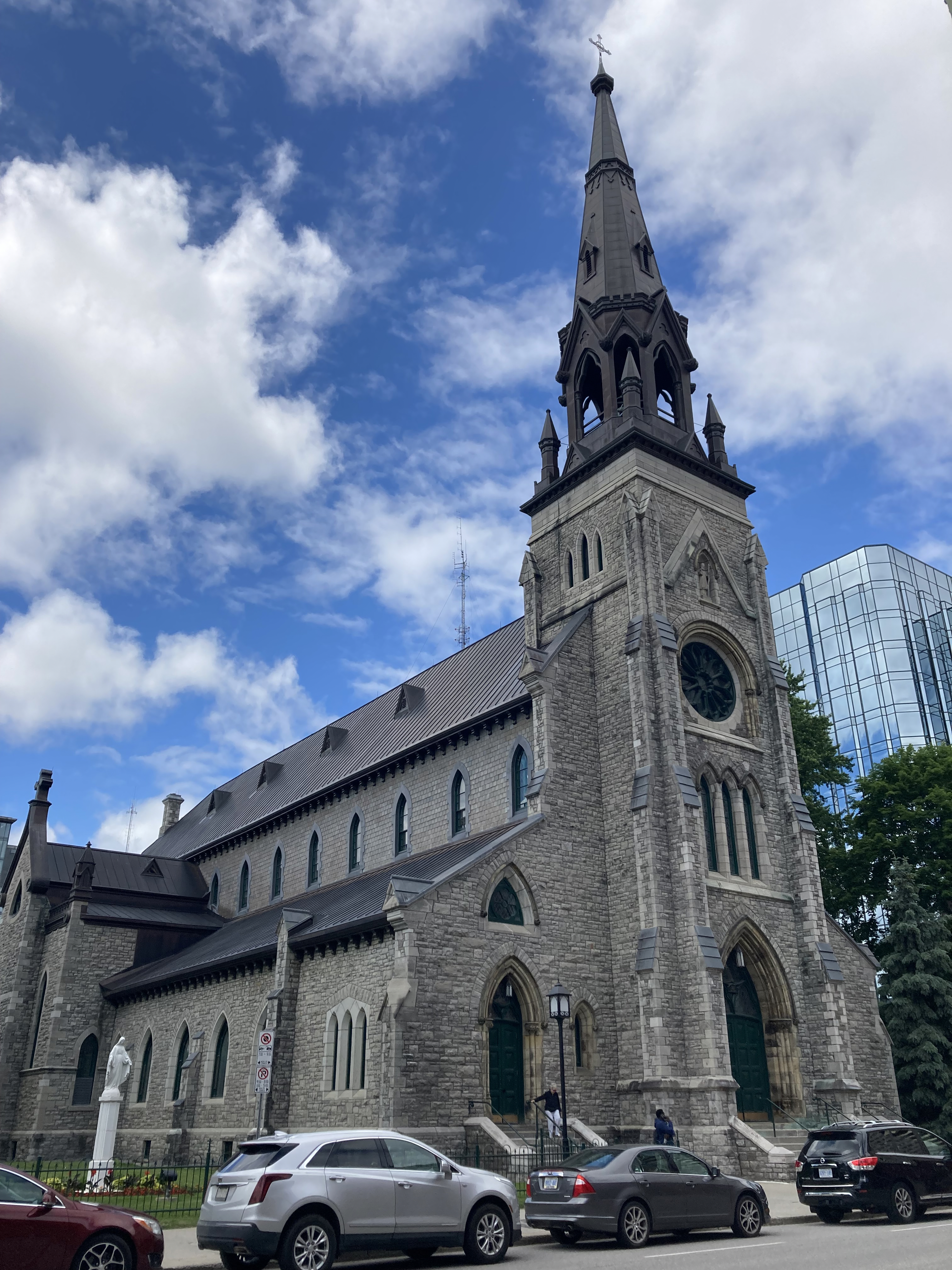
- St Patrick's Basilica
- St Patrick's Basilica (Ottawa)
- 45°25′00″N 75°42′02″W
- Location: 220 Kent Street; Ottawa, Ontario; K1R 5G2
- Denomination: Roman Catholic
- Website: basilica.ca

History
- Dedication: St. Patrick

Administration
- Province: Canada
- Diocese: Roman Catholic Archdiocese of Ottawa
- Parish: Ontario

The Basilica of Saint Patrick is a Roman Catholic Church in Ottawa, Ontario, Canada. Located at 281 Nepean Street (at the corner of Nepean and Kent) in Downtown Ottawa, it is the oldest church in the city that serves the English-speaking community. The Basilica is one of the regular buildings featured in the Doors Open Ottawa architectural heritage day.

Pope John Paul II raised the shrine to the status of Minor Basilica via his decree Sanctus Patricius Vir on 17 February 1995. The decree was signed and notarized by Cardinal Angelo Sodano.

== History ==
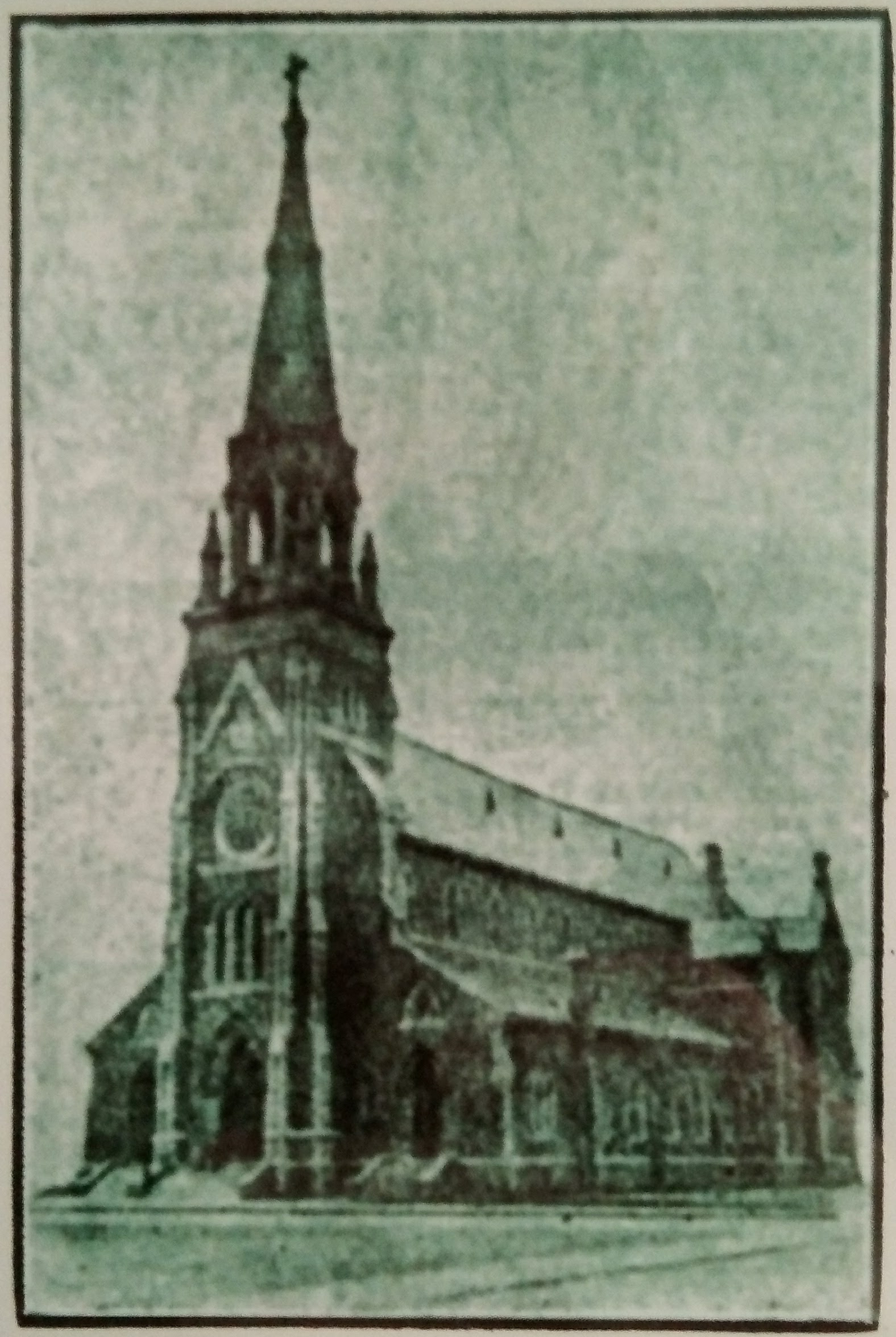
The basilica in 1922.

The parish was founded in 1855. Originally, it was intended to serve not only the English-speaking Catholics of Ottawa, but also those of the City of Hull (now absorbed into Gatineau) across the Ottawa River in Quebec as well. These were mostly of Irish descent; thus the parish was dedicated to St. Patrick, the patron saint of Ireland.

Design for the present church building started in 1869 under the direction of architect Augustus Laver. Laver's firm, Fuller and Laver, also designed the East and West blocks of Ottawa's Parliament Buildings. In 1872, the cornerstone was blessed by Bishop Guigues (the first Bishop of Ottawa), and was laid by John A. Macdonald (the first Prime Minister of Canada). King McCord Arnoldi (architect) was responsible from 1874 to 1875 for the completion of the original design prepared in 1869 by Augustus Laver.

In 1875, the building, not quite complete, was blessed by Bishop Guigues' successor, Bishop Duhamel. In 1898, Louis Zephirin Gauthier designed major alterations and a new altar for St. Patrick's, Kent Street at Nepean Street.

A memorial plaque was unveiled on June 11, 1916 and is dedicated to St. Patrick's Basilica in appreciation for the privilege of worshipping in this church by the commanding officer (from 19 Jun 1916 to 13 Sep 1916) Lieutenant Colonel D.R. Street, officers N.C.O.s. and Men of the (Ottawa) 77th Overseas Battalion Canadian Expeditionary Force (C.E.F.).

A World War I memorial painting, which depicts angels meeting a dying soldier on the battlefield and Jesus Christ on the cross, was erected by the parishioners and is dedicated to the soldiers of the St. Patrick's Basilica parish who fell during The Great War. At the bottom of the painting's wooden frame is the list of those soldiers. The Holy Name Society and Tabernacle Society erected a pair of stained glass windows depicting Military saints, which are dedicated to the Parish members who returned from World War II and those who made the supreme sacrifice. Memorial scrolls are dedicated to the members of the St. Patrick's Basilica Parish and Our lady of Perpetual Help Parish who volunteered for active service with Canada's fighting forces during World War II.

The Church was elevated to Basilica status on St. Patrick's Day, 1995.

== Architecture ==
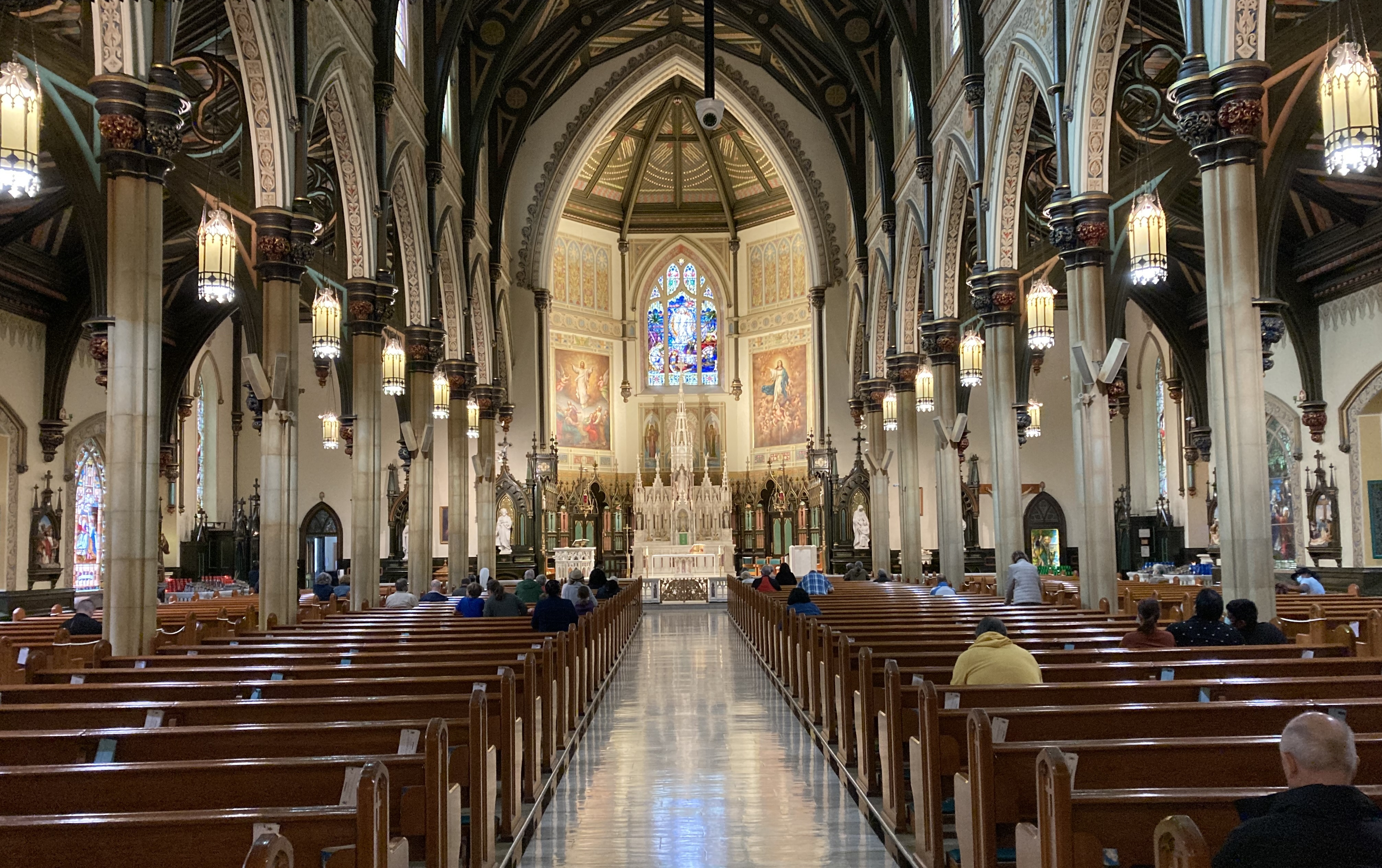
The interior of the basilica.

The building is made of local stone in the Gothic Revival style and features a carved and stencilled ceiling, marble altars, stained glass windows, and oak pews dating to 1954.

The base of the current Altar of Sacrifice was originally the site of the raised marble pulpit. This latter was originally installed in 1930 and relocated slightly in an interior renovation of 2003. The Altar of Reservation was built in 1902. To the right of the altar is a beautiful replica of Murillo's Assumption of the Virgin Mary, hand painted by Québec nuns in 1929.

The ceiling, most of the murals, and some of the stained glass windows are the work of Guido Nincheri from the 1920s and 1930s. The Stations of the Cross are bas-reliefs from 1876. The church seats about 1,000.

At the main entrance to the church are the World War I and World War II memorials listing the names of parishioners who died in those wars.

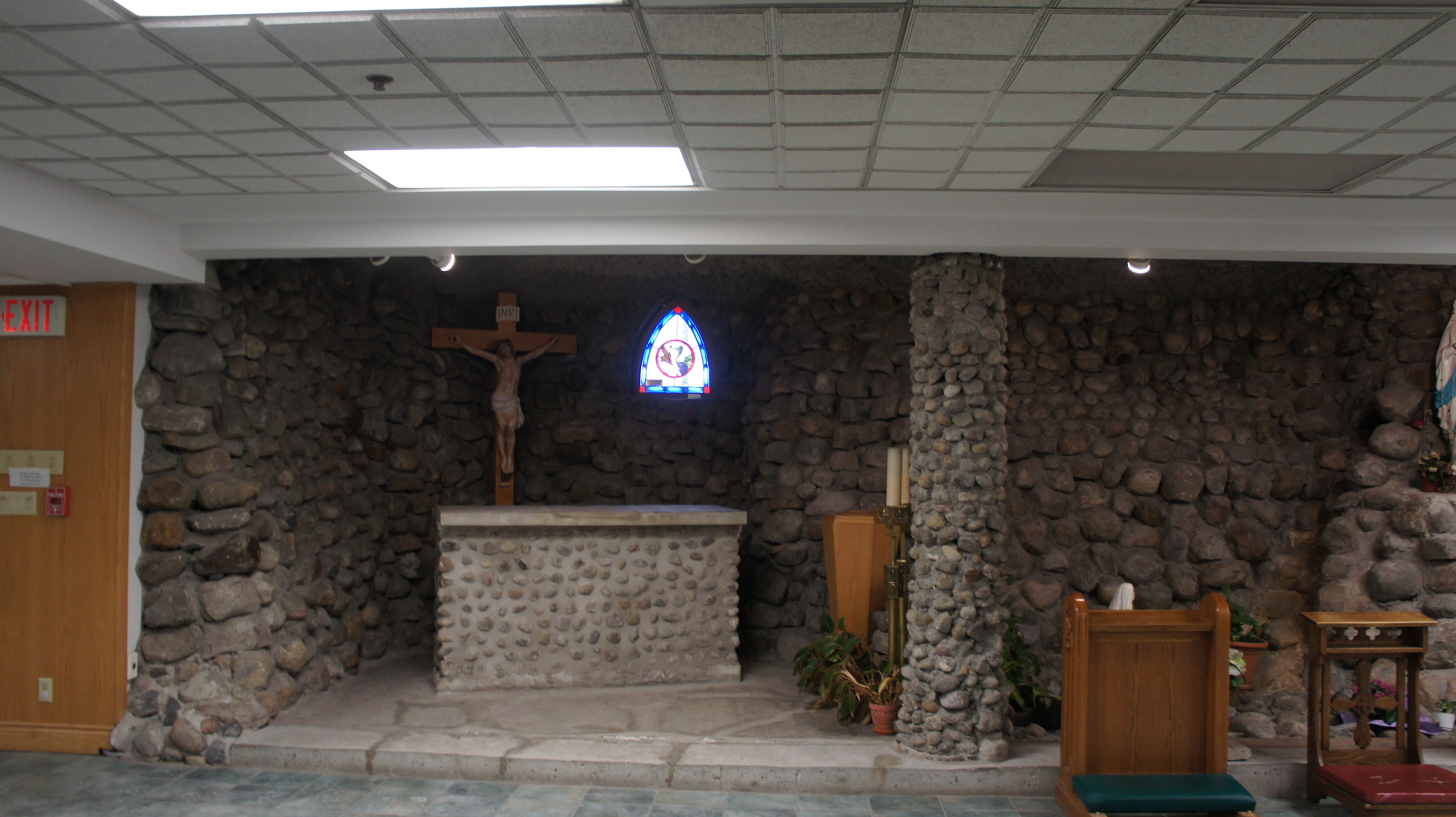
The Lourdes Grotto in the basement of the basilica was created in 1998.

In 1998 the basement of the church was excavated to form a basement (called the Scavi) containing a kitchen, meeting rooms, the Book Shop, and a Lourdes Grotto. The large area around the Lourdes Grotto is about two-thirds the size of the main church, and is used for Mass on occasions when the main church is unavailable.

=== Restoration ===
In 2009, the Basilica won the North American Copper in Architecture Awards (NACIA) in the Historical Restoration division. Engineering consultant John G. Cooke of John G. Cooke & Associates collaborated with building contracting firm Lari Construction to repair, replace and repoint stones, install anchors, and install a new copper roof. Heather & Little furnished the structure with a new copper steeple, copper cornice and dentil bands, belfry louvers, ornaments, and the stunning 20-oz copper ceiling of the spire. Work was done following the Canadian Federal Government publication Standards and Guidelines for the Conservation of Historic Places in Canada.

== Parish life ==
St. Patrick's Basilica has a number of social and devotional groups for parishioners:

- Knights of Columbus
- Legion of Mary
- Christian Meditation Group
- Traditional Franciscan Third Order
- Women of Grace
- Pro-life Group

Regular devotional events include:

- Parish Missions
- Monthly all-night Vigils of Eucharistic Adoration

The Basilica offers masses, confessions, daily holy hours and Novena throughout the week. Daily Masses before work (7:00 a.m., 8:00 a.m.), during lunch (12:15 p.m.), and after the workday (4:30 p.m.), with confessions before each service; Catholics citywide make use of the confessionals at Saint Patrick's.

Masses for Sunday obligation are:

- Saturdays: 4:30pm (Low Mass)
- Sundays: 8:00am (Low Mass), 9:30am, 11:00am, 12:15pm, 9:00pm

Educational activities include a formal R.C.I.A. program and a Continuing Adult Faith Formation program which has featured a variety of guest speakers. There is also a Book and Gift Shop in the Scavi. Social events include pancake breakfasts by the Knights of Columbus and a St. Patrick's day dinner, Coffee and Tea Sunday, Spaghetti dinners and St. Andrew's day dinner.

=== Music ===
==== Choirs ====
The basilica has five choirs under the direction of organist and choir director Francesca Bailey, A.R.C.T. The Adoremus Choir is an SATB choir focusing on the sacred classics in English and Latin at the 12:15 p.m. Mass on Sundays. The Saint Patrick's Singers are a group of volunteer soloist singers who provide their professional services on alternating weeks with the Basilica Choir, the oldest one at the St. Patrick's, who sing predominantly English unison music at the 11:00 a.m. Sunday Mass. A Youth Choir and a Children's Choir sing at the 9:30 a.m. Sunday Mass.

==== Organ ====
The first pipe organ of 1887 was built by S.R. Warren & Son. It was a two manual (Great and Swell) with pedal. About 30% of the present organ is from the original Warren. Casavant rebuilt and enlarged the Warren in 1898 to a three manual and pedal. Finally, Casavant rebuilt most of the mechanical parts of the organ again in 1930, adding chimes and a tremulant. The electric wiring was installed at that time as well, replacing an earlier water-powered motor.

== Pastors and rectors ==
St. Patrick's has had thirteen pastors and, since its elevation to Basilica status, five Rectors.

- Father Aeneas McDonnell Dawson (Pastor 1855–61)
- Father James McGrath, OMI (Pastor 1861–66)
- Father John Joseph Collins (Pastor 1866–77)
- Father John Lalor O'Connor (Pastor 1877–81)
- Father Matthew J. Whelan (Pastor 1881–1922)
- Monsignor George Edward Fitzgerald (Pastor 1922–39)
- Monsignor George David Prudhomme (Pastor 1939–51)
- Monsignor J. Leo LeSage (Pastor 1951–61)
- Bishop Joseph Raymond Windle (Pastor 1961–69)
- Bishop John M. Beahen (Pastor 1969–77)
- Monsignor Francis French (Pastor 1977–93)
- Monsignor David J. P. Corkery (Pastor 1993–95, First Rector 1995–98 )
- Monsignor Robert Martineau (Rector 1999–2009)
- Father Richard Siok (Rector 2009–2013, 2015–2016)
- Father Bosco Wong (Rector 2013–2015)
- Monsignor Kevin Beach (Rector 2016–2022)
- Father Stephen Amesse (Rector 2022–present)

== See also ==
- Notre-Dame Cathedral Basilica, Ottawa

== Bibliography ==
- Casey, Maurice (18 August 2010), The Parish of St. Patrick of Ottawa And What Led To It: An Historical Sketch by Maurice Casey, Ottawa, Ontario: Nabu Press This is a reproduction of a book published before 1923.
- McEvoy, Maurice, Enduring Faith; a History of Saint Patrick's Basilica Parish, Ottawa, 1855 - 2005, Ottawa, ON: Saint Patrick's Basilica
- O'Dwyer, William C, Highways of Destiny; a History of the Diocese of Pembroke, Ottawa Valley, Canada [Roman Catholic Church], Ottawa, Ontario 365.O.03.0: S

== Genealogy links ==
- Marriages, Baptisms, and Burials from St. Patrick's Basilica 1867–1881
