= Ottawa Basilica =

Ottawa Basilica may refer to:

- St. Patrick's Basilica (Ottawa)
- Notre-Dame Cathedral Basilica (Ottawa)
