= Roman Catholic Diocese of Mont-Laurier =

Catholic ecclesiastical territory

Diocese of Mont-Laurier Dioecesis Montis Laurei
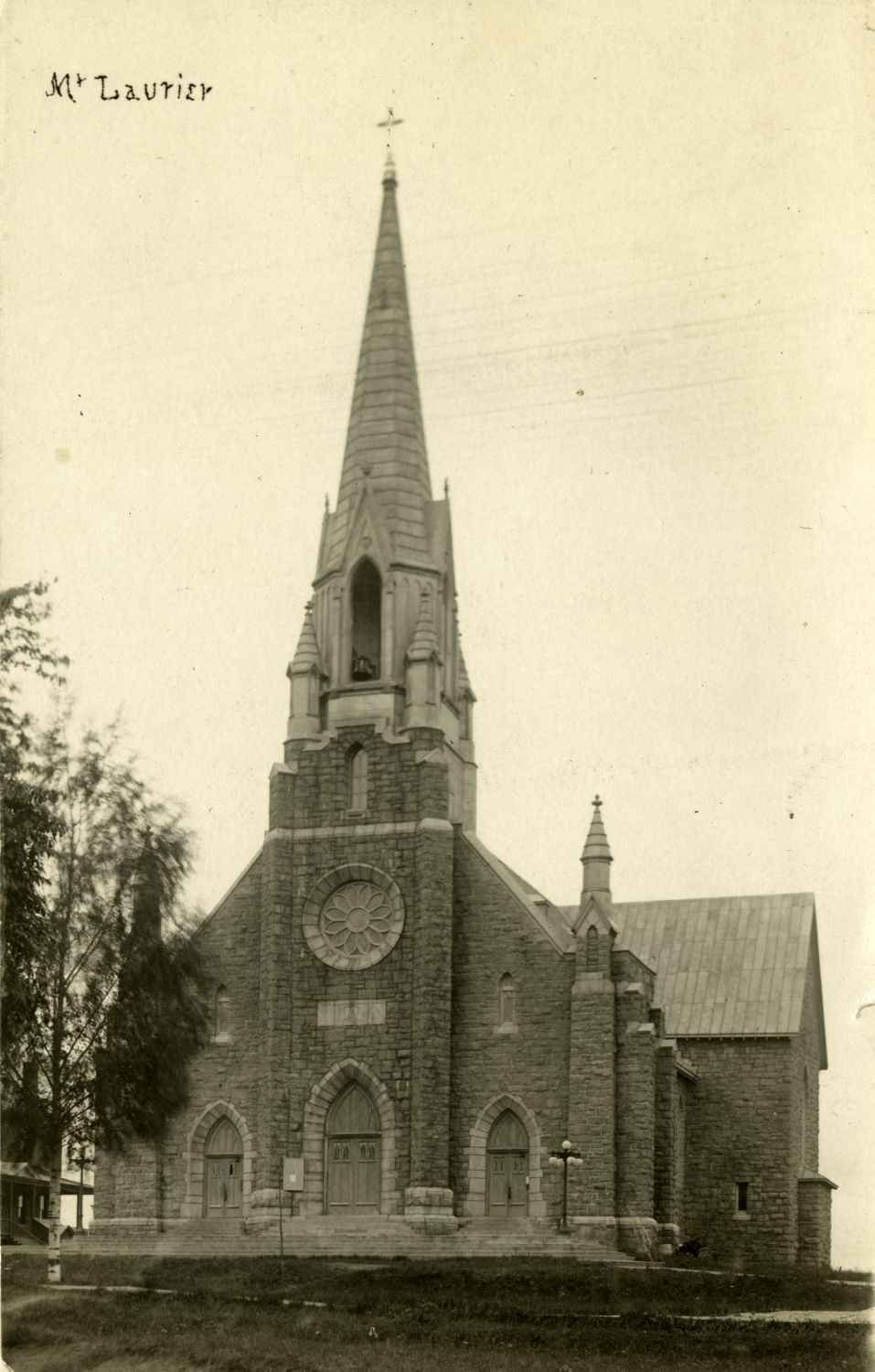
- Cathedral Notre-Dame-de-Fourvière

- Logo of the Diocese

Location
- Country: Canada
- Ecclesiastical province: Gatineau

Statistics
- Population: Total; Catholics: (as of 2021); 101,000; 81,250 (80.4%)
- Parishes: 16

Information
- Denomination: Catholic
- Sui iuris church: Latin Church
- Rite: Roman Rite
- Established: 1913
- Dissolved: 2022 (united with Diocese of Saint-Jérôme)
- Cathedral: Cathédrale Notre-Dame-de-Fourvière

Leadership
- Pope: Francis
- Bishop: Raymond Poisson
- Metropolitan Archbishop: Paul-André Durocher
- Bishops emeritus: Paul Lortie; Vital Massé

Map

Website
- dioceseml.com

The Diocese of Mont-Laurier (Latin: Dioecesis Montis Laurei) was a former Latin Church diocese that included part of the Province of Quebec. On 1 June 2022 the diocese was merged with the diocese of Saint-Jérôme, becoming the Diocese of Saint-Jérôme–Mont-Laurier.

As of 2021, the Diocese had 16 parishes, 22 active diocesan priests, 2 religious priests, and 81,250 Catholics. It also had 5 Women Religious, and 2 Religious Brothers. The Vatican's website, as of 2011, gives an area of 19,968 (units not given); a total population of 95,256; a Catholic population of 77,340; 35 priests; 1 permanent deacon; and 58 religious.

After Bishop Lortie's retirement, this diocese came under an Apostolic Administrator, Most Rev. Paul-André Durocher, Archbishop of Gatineau, the metropolitan of the ecclesiastical province which includes this diocese.

On June 1, 2020, Pope Francis appointed Raymond Poisson to serve as Bishop of Mont-Laurier, concurrently as Bishop of Saint-Jerome, in the form of in persona episcopi ("in the persons of the bishop").

== Diocesan bishops ==
The following is a list of the bishops of Mont-Laurier, including auxiliary bishops, and their terms of service:

- François-Xavier Brunet (1913-1922)
- Joseph-Eugène Limoges (1922-1965)
- Joseph Louis André Ouellette (1956-1978)
- Jean Gratton (1978-2001)
- Vital Massé (2001-2012)
- Paul Lortie (2012-2019)
- Raymond Poisson (2020–Present)
