= Gaudreau =

Gaudreau is a French surname and may refer to:

- Antoine Gaudreau (c. 1860–1746), French furniture maker
- François Gaudreau (born 1957), Canadian politician
- Frédérick Gaudreau (born 1993), Canadian ice hockey centre
- Jean Gaudreau (born 1964), Canadian artist
- Johnny Gaudreau (1993–2024), American ice hockey winger
- Rob Gaudreau (born 1970), American ice hockey winger
- Robert Gaudreau (1944–2025), American ice hockey defenseman
