= Saint Paul University =

University in Ottawa, Ontario, Canada

- Université Saint-Paul
- Type: Public; Pontifical university
- Established: 1848; 178 years ago
- Religious affiliation: Roman Catholic (Missionary Oblates of Mary Immaculate)
- Academic affiliations: University of Ottawa, AUCC, IAU, AUFC, ACU, CBIE, NDEA (International affiliate)
- Chancellor: Most Reverend Marcel Damphousse, Roman Catholic Archdiocese of Ottawa–Cornwall
- Rector: Louis Patrick Leroux
- Students: 1070
- Undergraduates: 374 full-time + 258 part-time
- Postgraduates: 332 full-time + 106 part-time
- Location: 223 Main Street, Ottawa, Ontario, Canada; 45.4081°N 75.676°W
- Campus: Urban
- Website: www.ustpaul.ca

Saint Paul University (French: Université Saint-Paul) is a bilingual Catholic university federated with the University of Ottawa since 1965. It is located on Main Street in Canada's capital city, Ottawa, Ontario. Fully bilingual, it offers instruction in both of the country's official languages: French and English. The university has been entrusted for over a century and a half to the Congregation of the Missionary Oblates of Mary Immaculate. In August 1866, the university was endowed a civil charter that was passed by the government of the Province of Canada. It later received a pontifical declaration promulgated by Pope Leo XIII on 5 February 1889.

== History ==
In 1848, Joseph-Bruno Guigues, the first bishop of the Roman Catholic Archdiocese of Ottawa, established the College of Bytown. In 1856, the college was officially entrusted to the Missionary Oblates of Mary Immaculate, and, in 1866, it was renamed the College of Ottawa. The institution would later rewrite its pontifical charter in keeping with the Apostolic Constitution of Pope Pius XI, and also rewrote its civil charter around the same time. Its rewritten civil charter was approved by the Government of Ontario in 1933, when it was officially renamed the University of Ottawa, and its revised pontifical charter was approved by the Holy See in 1934. On July 1, 1965, by an act of the Ontario Legislature, the institution previously known as the University of Ottawa was renamed Saint Paul University, which retained its civil and pontifical charters, while a new corporate body, to be known as the University of Ottawa, was created to inherit the majority of the university's holdings.

== Faculties ==
- Canon Law
- Human Sciences
- Philosophy
- Theology

== Undergraduate programs ==
- Social Communications
- Human Relations and Spirituality
- Public Ethics and Philosophy
- Conflict Studies
- Social Innovation
- Theology

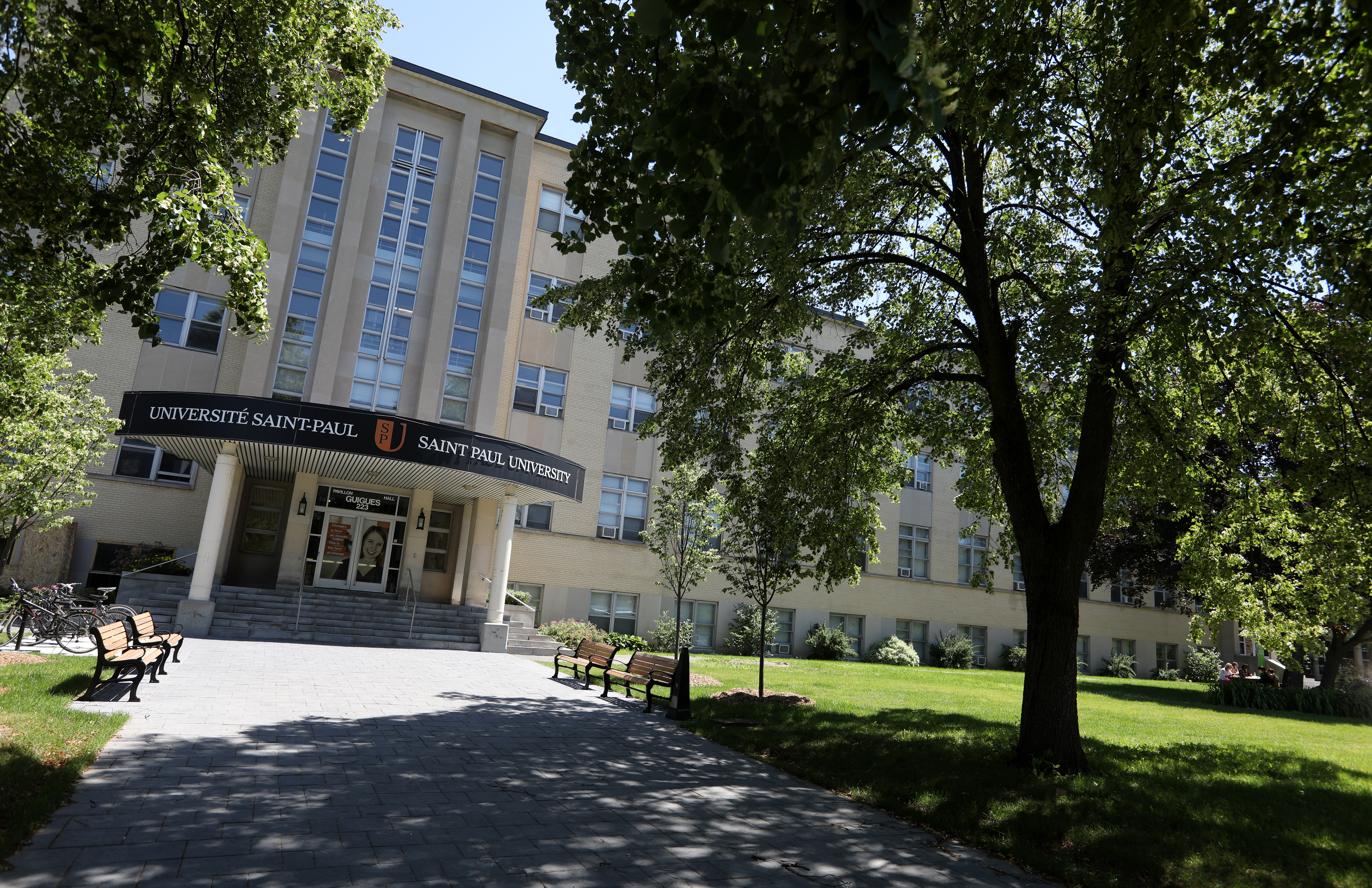
Guigues Hall, Saint Paul University

== Graduate programs ==
- Counselling, Psychotherapy and Spirituality
- Canon Law
- Conflict Studies
- Public Ethics and Philosophy
- Leadership, Ecology and Equity
- Theology

== Research centers and institutes ==
- Research Centre for Vatican II and 21st Century Catholicism
- Centre for Religious Education and Catechesis
- Research Centre in Public Ethics and Governance
- Centre for Research on Conflict
- Sophia Research Centre
- Lonergan Centre

== Research chairs ==
- Research Chair for Religious History of Canada
- Chair in Christian Family Studies
- Mercy and Presentation Sisters Chair

== Jean-Léon Allie Library and Archives ==
The collection contains over 500,000 volumes, 1,000 current periodicals and some 100,000 microforms.

History

The library began with four books on April 27, 1937, as the library of the University of Ottawa's seminary. The late Father Jean-Léon Allie, O.M.I., was its founder and first Chief Librarian. After occupying that post for more than 40 years, Father Allie continued to devote all his energies to the Library, as Acquisitions Librarian, then as University Librarian Emeritus, until his death on November 26, 1996.

It is the largest library of its kind in Canada. As early as 1963, in a survey conducted for the National Conference of Canadian Universities and Colleges, Edwin E. Williams of Harvard University stated: "Ottawa (i.e. Saint Paul University) has nationally outstanding collections for philosophy and religious history, with advanced research holdings for work in ... medieval studies."

The organization of the collection follows that of the Library of Congress mixed the Lynn-Peterson Classification System.

== Partnership ==
The university is a member of the Association of Colleges and Universities of the Canadian Francophonie, a network of academic institutions of the Canadian Francophonie.

It was announced from autumn 2017, that St. Paul's, will begin offering, a joint distance learning, Licentiate in Canon Law (JCL) and joint civil masters in canon law with St. Patrick's College, Maynooth, Ireland.

== Alumni ==
- Cardinal Francis Eugene George, OMI
- Bishop Kathryn Otley BTh (2004) and MPT (2006)
- Sister Helen Prejean M.A. (1973)
- Richard Moth, MA and JCL (1987)

== See also ==
- List of colleges and universities named after people

== Bibliography ==
- Schlitt, Dale M.; Saint Paul University. (2008). Université Saint-Paul : hier, aujourd'hui et demain = Saint Paul University : yesterday, today and tomorrow. Ottawa: Université Saint-Paul = Saint Paul University. ISBN 978-0-919261-60-0.
