= François-Xavier Brunet =

- Bishop of Mont-Laurier, Quebec
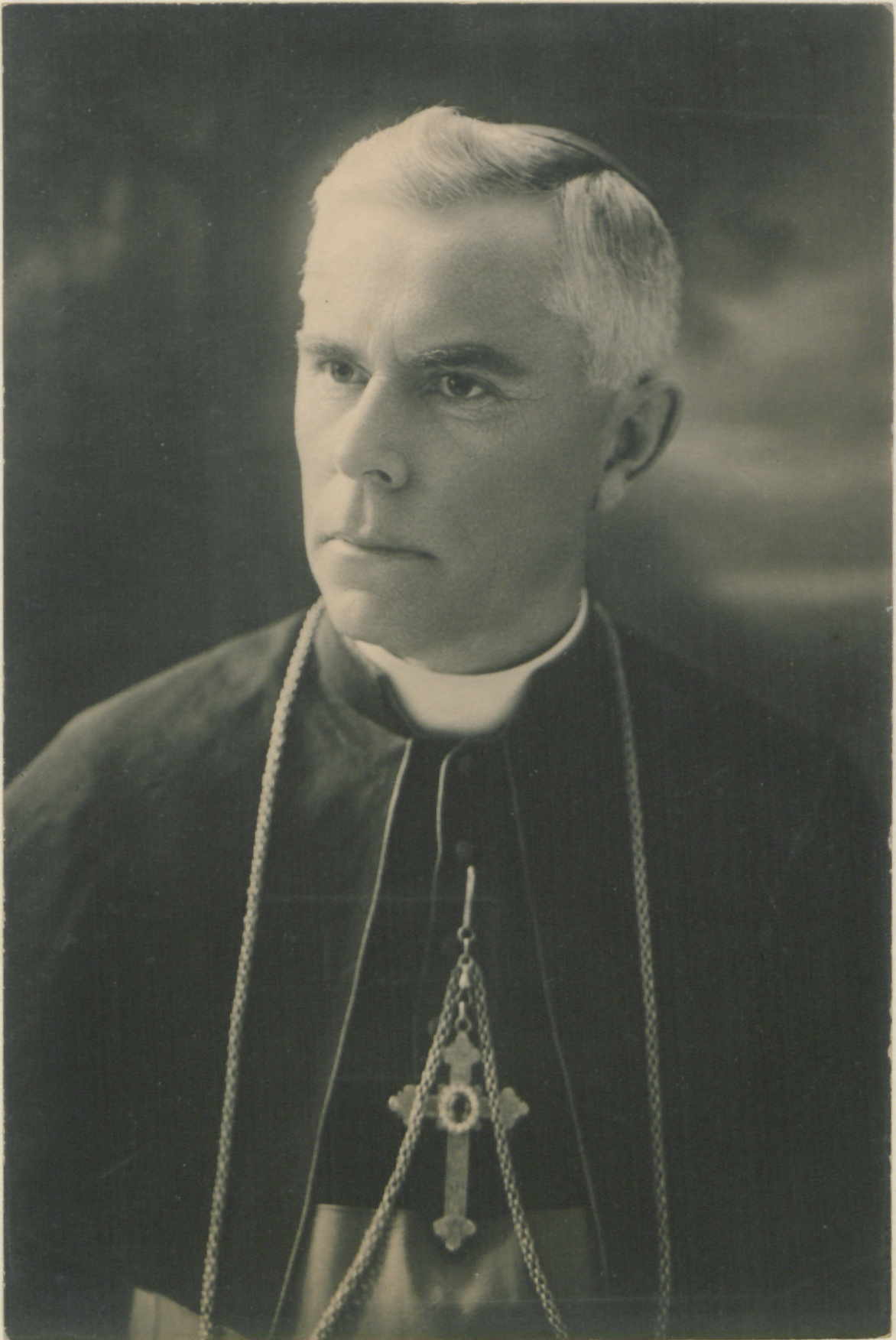
- Diocese: Mont-Laurier
- Installed: August 6, 1913
- Term ended: January 7, 1922
- Predecessor: Diocese erected in 1913.
- Successor: Joseph-Eugène Limoges

Orders
- Ordination: September 23, 1893

Personal details
- Born: November 27, 1868 Saint-André-d'Argenteuil, Quebec
- Died: January 7, 1922 (aged 53) Montreal, Quebec

François-Xavier Brunet (November 27, 1868 – January 7, 1922) was a Canadian Roman Catholic priest and bishop of Mont-Laurier, Quebec.

== Biography ==
Baptized in the parish of Saint-André-d'Argenteuil, Quebec, he moved to Ottawa in 1873. He received a Bachelor of Arts degree in 1890 from the College of Ottawa. He then decided to become a priest and studied theology at the Grand Séminaire d'Ottawa.

Brunet was consecrated by Archbishop Joseph-Thomas Duhamel of Ottawa in 1893. In 1913, he was appointed the first bishop of the new diocese of Mont-Laurier, which was created from parts of the Archdiocese of Montréal and the Archdiocese of Ottawa.

He died in Montreal in 1922.
