= St. Joseph Cathedral (Gatineau) =

Church in Gatineau, Quebec, Canada

- Cathédrale Saint-Joseph de Gatineau
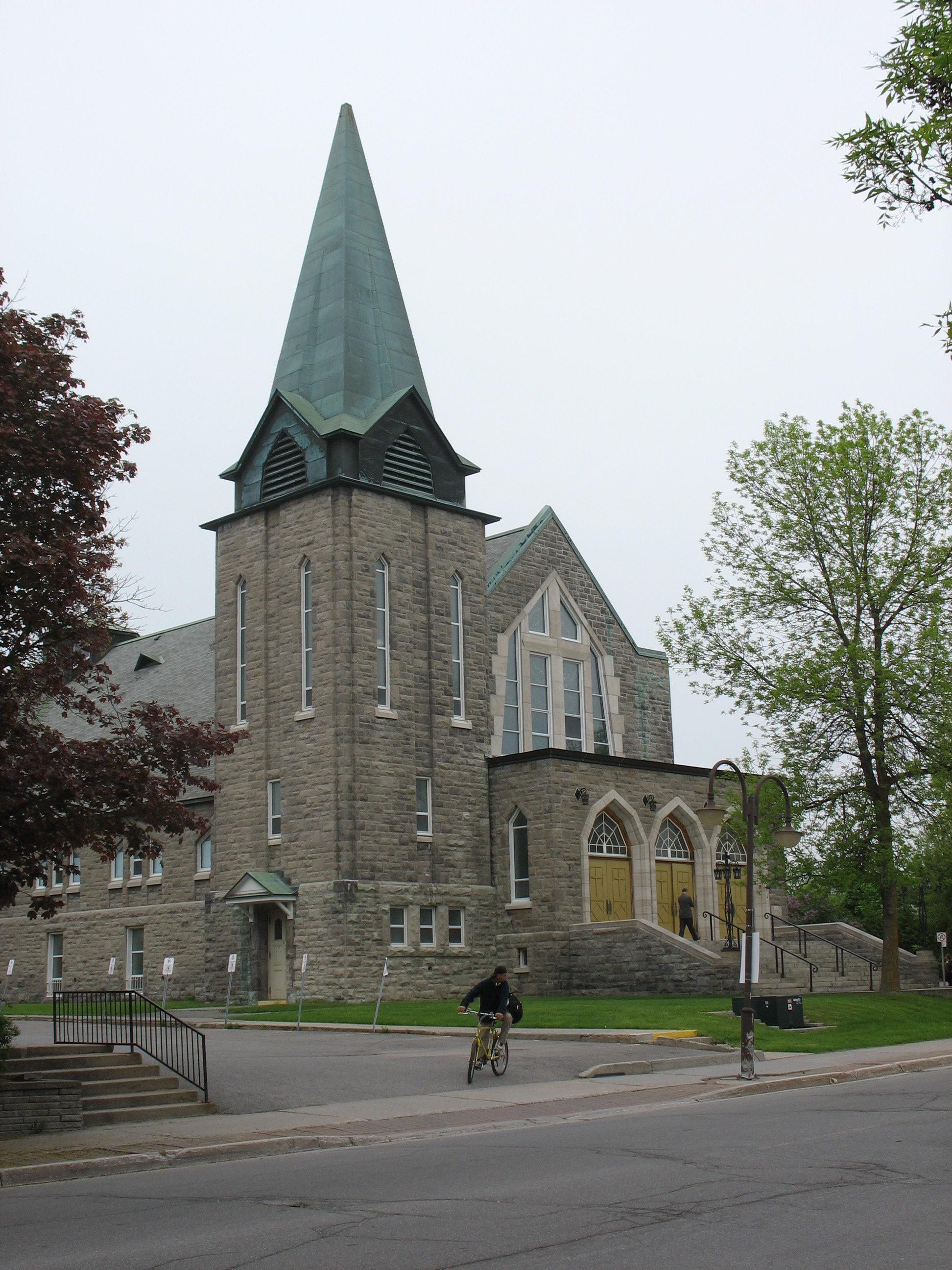
- St. Joseph Cathedral (Gatineau)
- 45.4357°N 75.7333°W
- Location: 245, boulevard Saint-Joseph; Gatineau, Quebec; J8Y 3X5
- Denomination: Roman Catholic Church
- Website: paroissestjoseph.ca

Architecture
- Groundbreaking: 1951
- Completed: 1952

The Cathedral of St. Joseph (French: Cathédrale Saint-Joseph de Gatineau) in Gatineau, Quebec, is a parish of the Roman Catholic Church and seat of the Archdiocese of Gatineau (Archidioecesis Gatinensis). The cathedral church is located in the former city of Hull, at 245, boulevard Saint-Joseph.

Its construction began in 1951 and ended the following year under the plan and design of Lucien Sarra-Bournet.

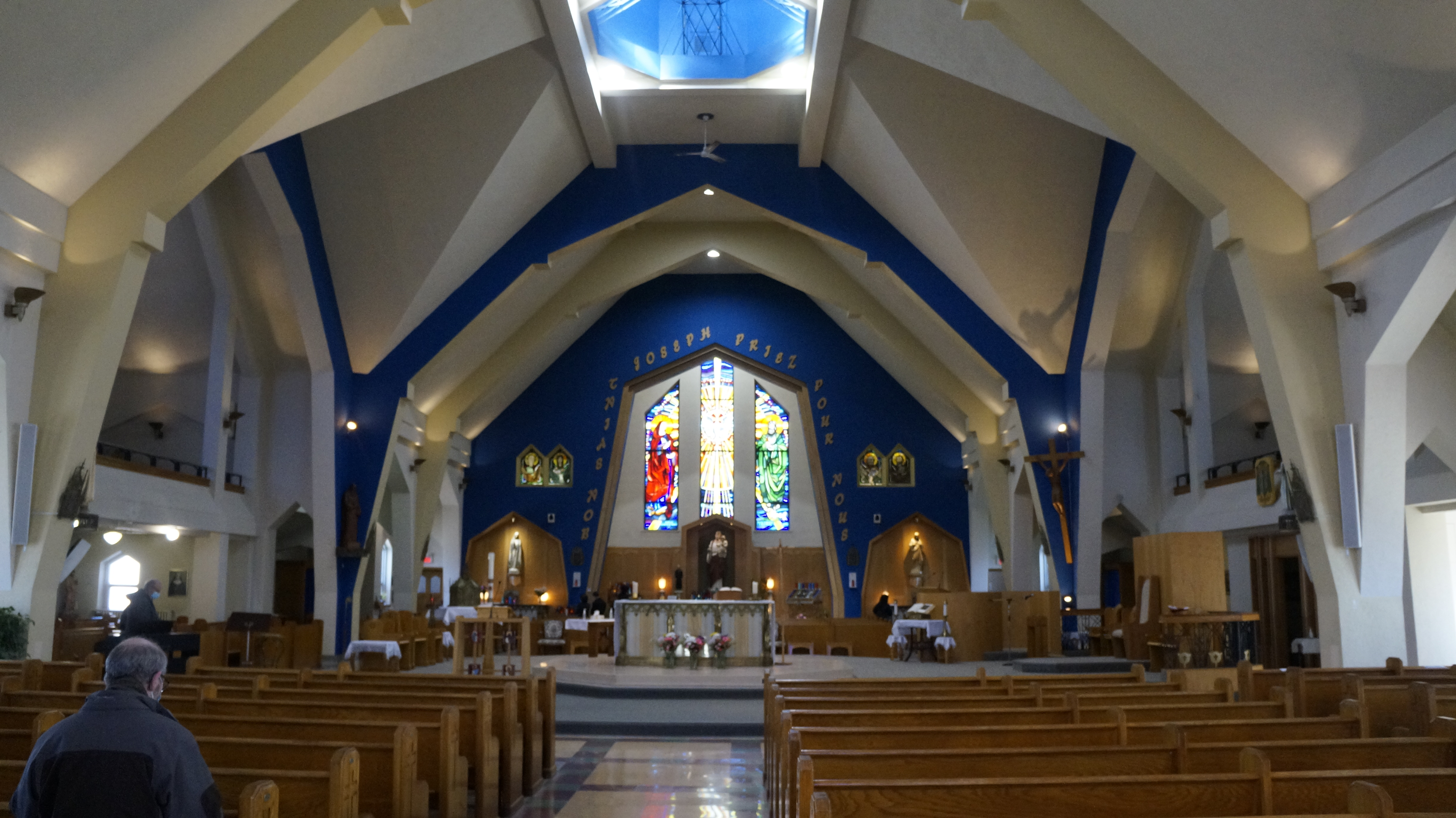
St. Joseph Cathedral interior

== See also ==
- Catholic Church in Canada
