= Archdiocese of Gatineau =

Catholic ecclesiastical territory in Quebec

Coordinates: 45.4358°N 75.7338°W

Archdiocese of Gatineau Archidioecesis Gatinensis Archidiocèse de Gatineau
- Coat of arms

Location
- Country: Canada
- Ecclesiastical province: Gatineau

Statistics
- Population: Total; Catholics: (as of 2006); 277,192; 231,325 (83.5%)
- Parishes: 61

Information
- Denomination: Catholic
- Sui iuris church: Latin Church
- Rite: Roman Rite
- Cathedral: St. Joseph Cathedral, Gatineau
- Patron saint: Mary, Mother of the Church

Current leadership
- Pope: Leo XIV
- Archbishop: Paul-André Durocher
- Bishops emeritus: Roger Ébacher

Map

Website
- diocesegatineau.org

The Archdiocese of Gatineau (Latin: Archidioecesis Gatinensis) is a Latin Church ecclesiastical territory or diocese situated in the province of Quebec. The Archdiocese of Gatineau is the metropolitan of its ecclesiastical province, which also contains two suffragan dioceses: Dioceses of Amos and Rouyn-Noranda. It is currently led by Archbishop Paul-André Durocher.

As of 2006, the archdiocese contains 61 parishes, 47 active diocesan priests, 29 religious priests, and 231,000 Catholics. It also has 202 women religious, and 39 religious brothers.

== Diocesan bishops ==
The following is a list of the bishops and archbishops of Gatineau and their terms of service:

- Paul-Émile Charbonneau (1963–1973)
- Adolphe E. Proulx (1974–1987)
- Roger Ébacher (1988–2011)
- Paul-André Durocher (2011–present)

== History ==
The archdiocese was founded in 1963 as the "Diocese of Hull," within the ecclesiastical province of Ottawa and with territory taken from the Archdiocese of Ottawa. Its name was changed in 1982 to "Diocese of Gatineau–Hull." In 1990, the diocese was raised to the rank of a metropolitan see as the "Archdiocese of Gatineau–Hull." Its current name was established in 2005.

== Cathedral ==
When the diocese was founded in 1963 as the Diocese of Hull, it had as its cathedral, Holy Redeemer Church in Hull. In 1982, when it was renamed as the Diocese of Gatineau–Hull, it had two co-cathedrals, St. John Vianney Church in Gatineau and St. Joseph Church in Hull. In 2005, when it became the Archdiocese of Gatineau, it ceased to have co-cathedrals as St. Joseph Cathedral became the cathedral for the whole archdiocese.

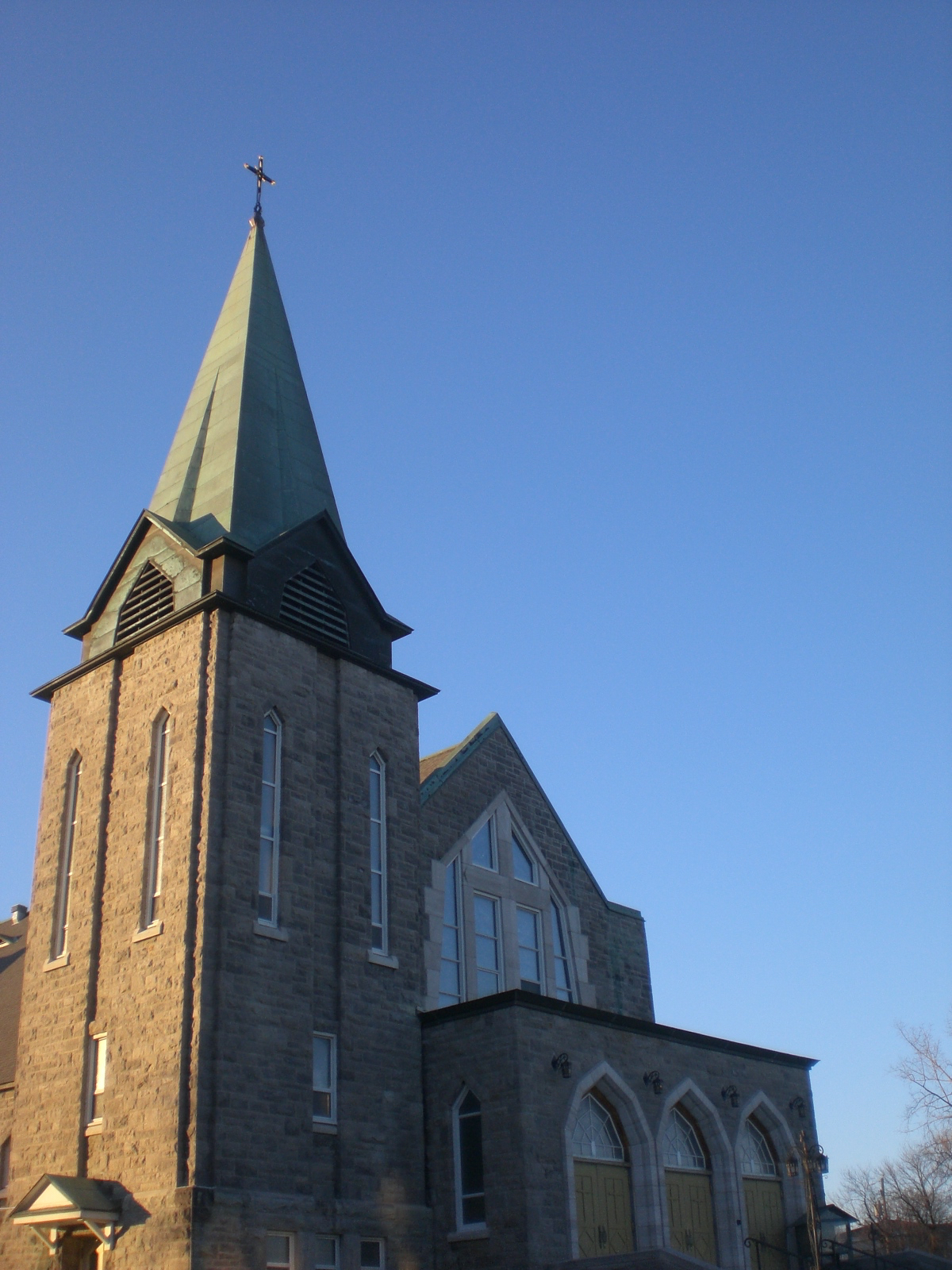
Cathedral entrance

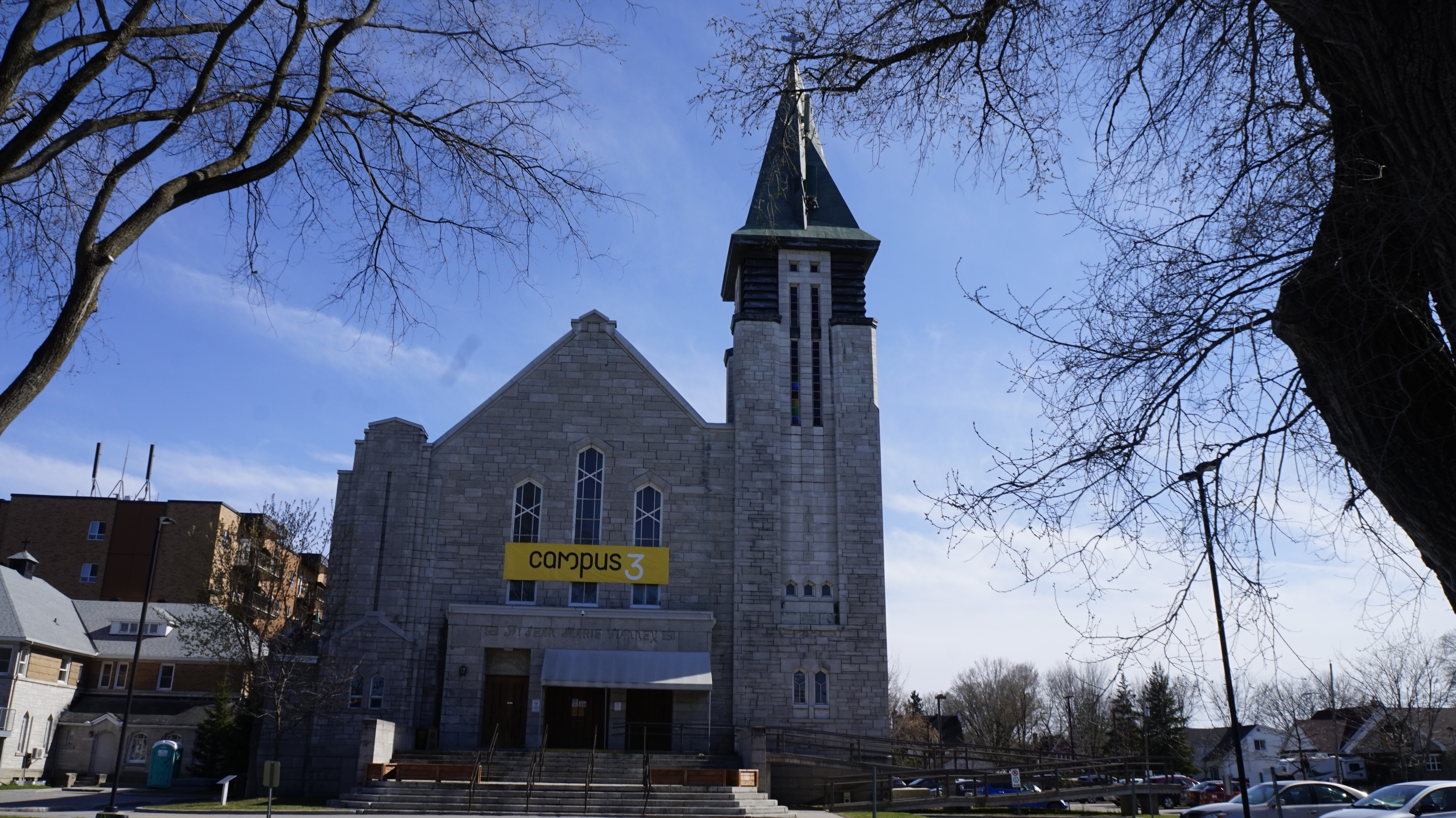
Former St. John Vianney Church in Gatineau
