= St. Finnan's Basilica =

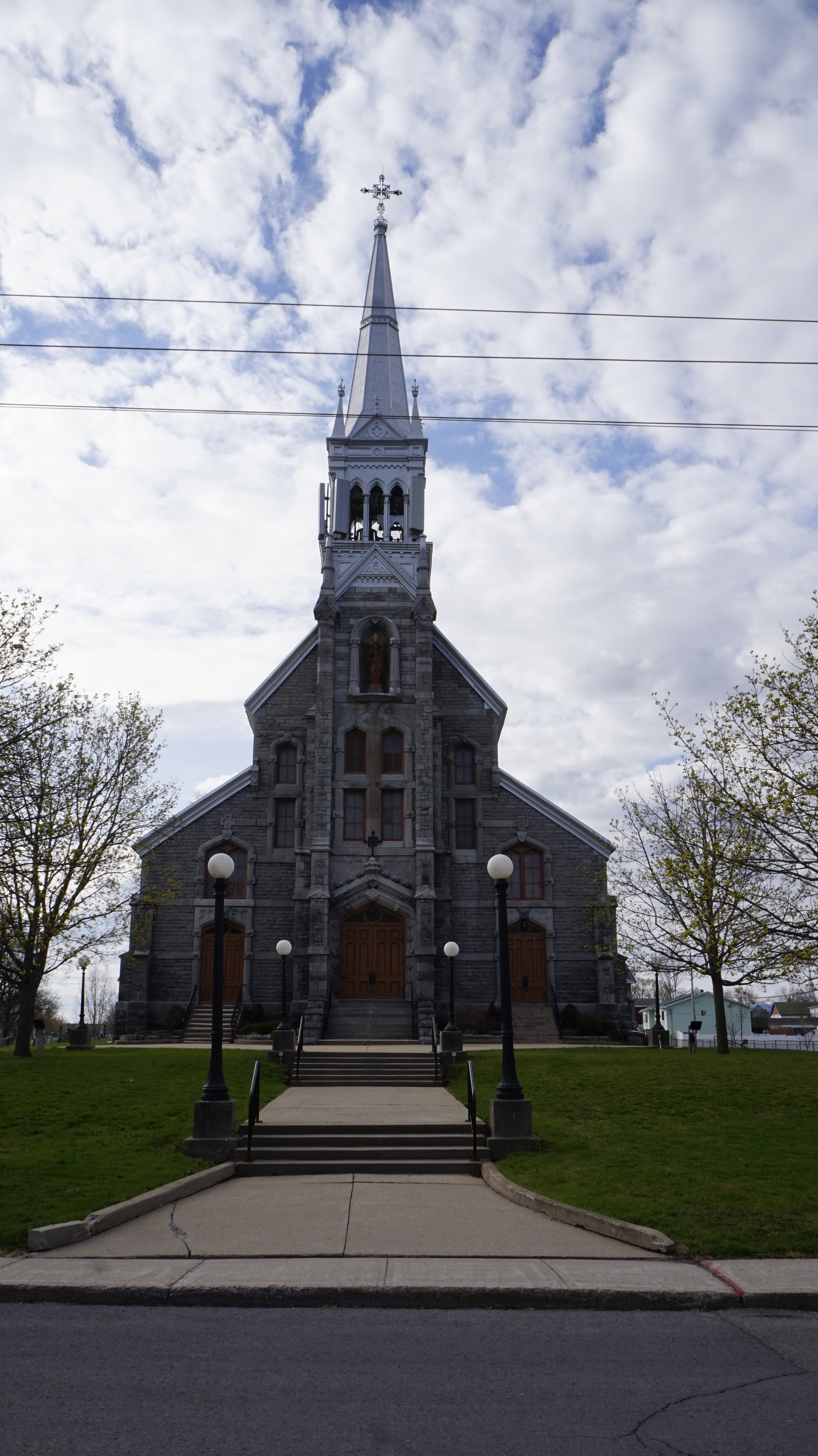
- St. Finnan's Basilica
- 45.3101°N 74.6325°W
- Location: 72 St Paul St, Alexandria, Ontario; K0C 1A0
- Country: Canada
- Denomination: Roman Catholic
- Website: stfinnan.ca

History
- Former name(s): St. Finnan's Church; St. Finnan's Cathedral
- Status: minor basilica
- Dedication: St. Finnan

Architecture
- Architect: William H. Hodson
- Years built: 1883-1885
- Completed: 1885
- Construction cost: $35,000

Administration
- Archdiocese: Archdiocese of Ottawa–Cornwall

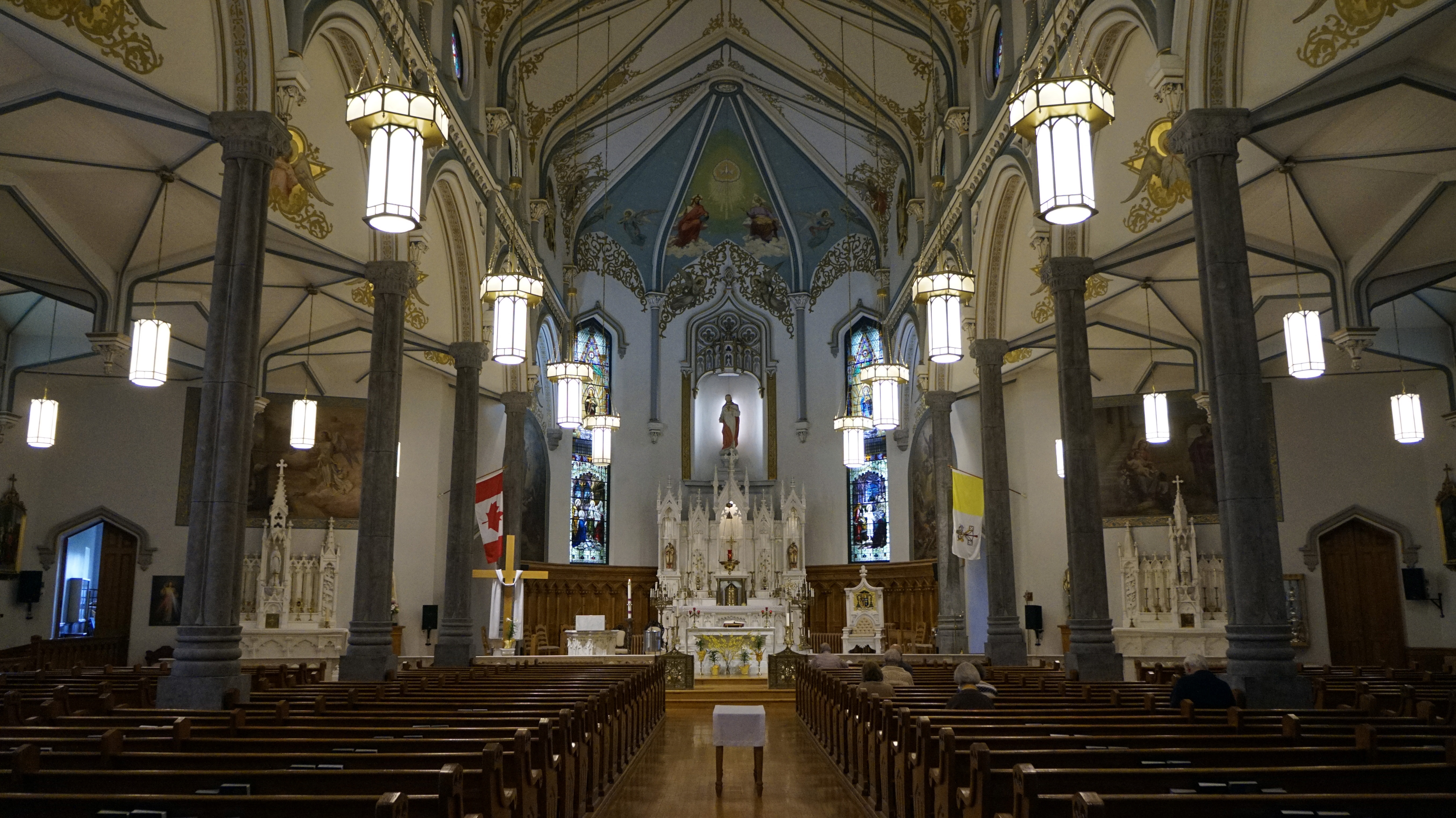
Interior

St. Finnan's Basilica is a minor basilica and former cathedral in Alexandria, Ontario. The basilica served as the cathedral of the Diocese of Alexandria–Cornwall from 1890 to its suppression in 2020.

== History ==
The church's history began in 1832 when Alexander Macdonell established a mission in Priest's Mill (later to be renamed to Alexandria, in honour of Macdonnell) the following year, a church was built and in 1840, the mission was elevated to a parish.

During the pastorate of Fr. Alexander Macdonell the basilica was constructed from 1883 to 1885. In 1890, Pope Leo XIII established the Diocese of Alexandria in Ontario and named Macdonnell as bishop. On October 28, 1890, he was consecrated bishop at St. Finnan. He chose St. Finnan's as his episcopal seat, elevating the church to a cathedral.

The basilica houses a Casavant organ, Opus 284, installed in 1907.

On May 6, 2020, Pope Francis united the Diocese of Alexandria–Cornwall with the Archdiocese of Ottawa to create the Archdiocese of Ottawa–Cornwall, reverting the cathedral to a parish.

On February 19, 2021, Cardinal Robert Sarah, prefect of the Congregation for Divine Worship and the Discipline of the Sacraments, on behalf of Pope Francis, designated the church as a minor basilica.
