= William Andrew Macdonell =

Bishop William Andrew Macdonell, Roman Catholic Bishop of Alexandria in Ontario, Canada was born on 30 November 1853 at Rivière-aux-Raisins, Glengarry County, Ontario

== Life ==
On 11 September 1881, aged 27, he was ordained a priest. On 21 March 1906, aged 52, he was appointed Bishop of Alexandria in Ontario, Canada, and was ordained as such three months later, on 24 June 1906.

== Death ==
He died on 17 November 1920, aged 67. He had been a priest for 39 years and a bishop for 14 years.
