= Alexander Macdonell (bishop of Alexandria–Cornwall) =

Roman Catholic Bishop of Alexandria–Cornwall, Canada

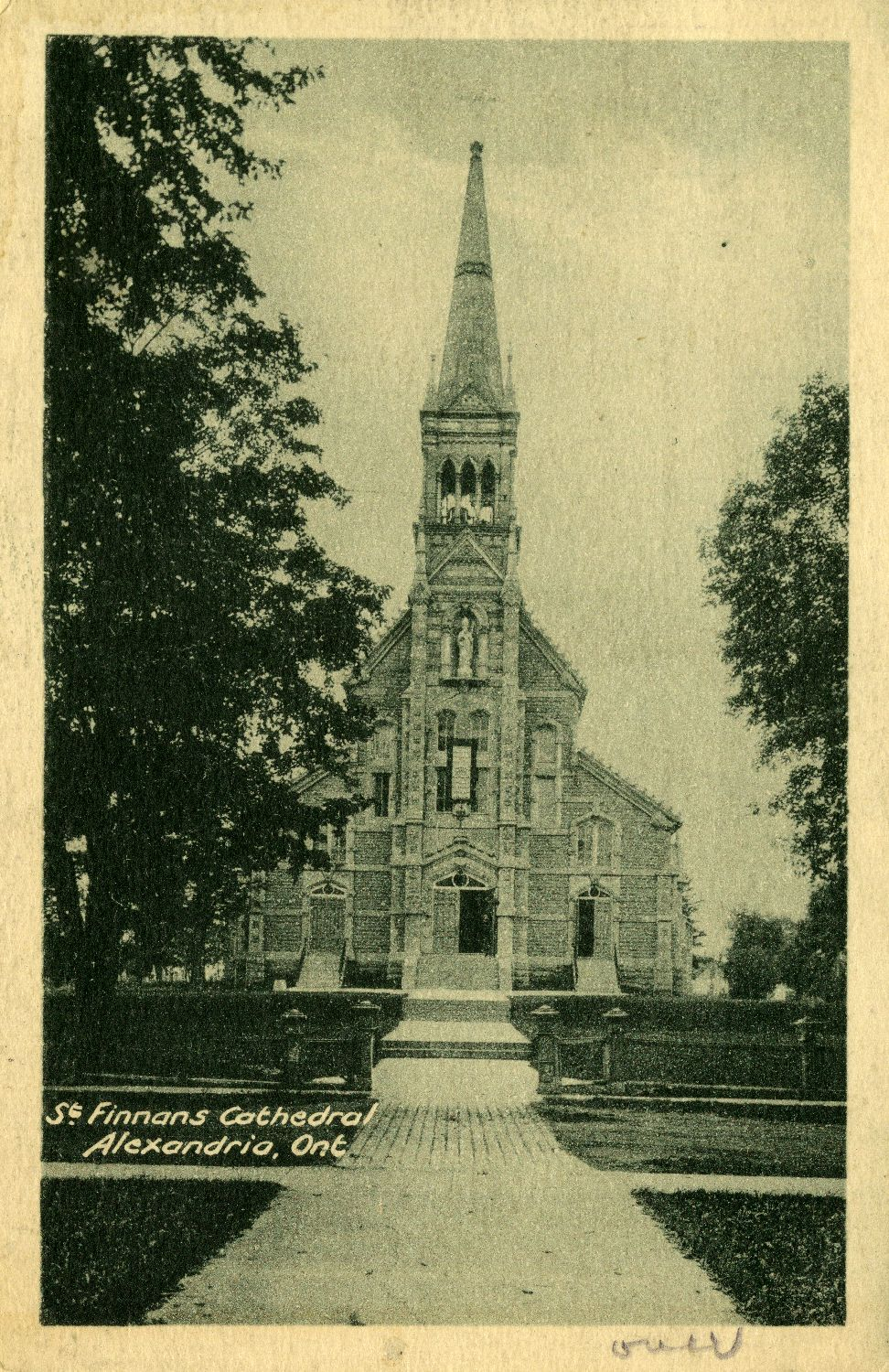
La Cathédrale Saint-Finnans, Alexandria, Ontario

Alexander Macdonell (1 November 1833 - 30 May 1905) was the first Bishop of the newly formed Roman Catholic Diocese of Alexandria-Cornwall, serving from 1890 until his death in 1905.

== Life ==
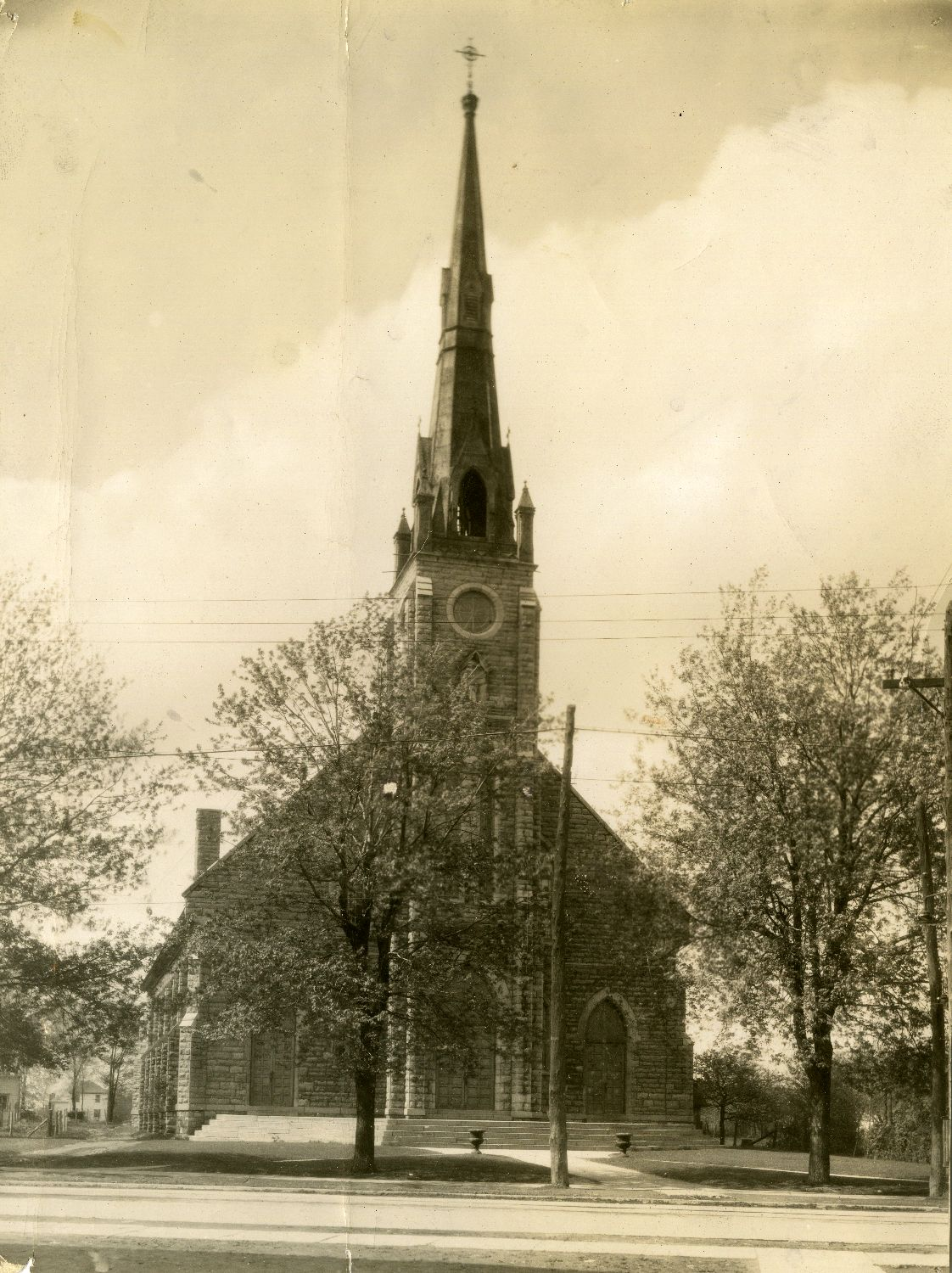
Église de la Nativilé de Cornwall en Ontario

Alexander Macdonell was born on 1 November 1833 in Lochiel, Ontario. He spoke English, French, and Gaelic, and went to the local school before attending the College of Bytown in 1857. He then continued his theological studies at Regiopolis College in Kingston.

Macdonnell ordained as a priest on 20 December 1862, aged 29. He was curate first at Gananoque, before becoming pastor of his home parish of St. Andrew's, Lochiel. After sixteen years, he was sent to St. Finnan's, Alexandria, where he rebuilt the parish church. In 1886 he was appointed vicar general for the Diocese of Kingston.

On 18 July 1890, aged 56, he was appointed Bishop of the newly created Diocese of Alexandria-Cornwall, a suffragan see of Kingston. Three months later, on 28 October 1890, he was consecrated accordingly. He chose St. Finnan's as his episcopal seat.

During his tenure, the number of French speaking Catholics significantly increased, particularly in Cornwall. In 1892, the decision was made that La Nativité would serve the French speaking population.

== Death ==
Eventually the stresses of the office began to take their toll. He died, aged 71, on 30 May 1905. He had been a priest for 42 years and a bishop for 14 years.
