= Paul-Émile Charbonneau =

Canadian Roman Catholic bishop

- Bishop of the Archdiocese of Gatineau (emeritus)
- Church: Roman Catholic Church
- See: Diocese of Hull (now Archdiocese of Gatineau)
- In office: 1963 - 1973
- Predecessor: none
- Successor: Adolphe E. Proulx
- Previous post(s): Prelate

Orders
- Ordination: May 31, 1947

Personal details
- Born: May 4, 1922; Sainte-Thérèse, Quebec
- Died: May 21, 2014 (aged 92)

Paul-Émile Charbonneau (May 4, 1922 – May 21, 2014) was a Canadian Prelate of Catholic Church.

Charbonneau was born in Sainte-Thérèse, Quebec and was ordained a priest on May 31, 1947. Charbonneau was appointed auxiliary bishop to the Archdiocese of Ottawa as well as titular bishop of Thapsus on November 15, 1960, and consecrated on January 18, 1961. Charbonneau was appointed bishop of Hull, a new diocese (now the Archdiocese of Gatineau) on March 21, 1963, and resigned April 12, 1973. He died on May 21, 2014.
