= Alexandre Vachon =

His Excellency Alexandre Vachon
- Archbishop of Ottawa
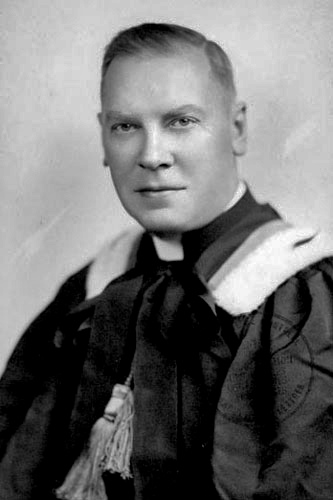
- Church: Roman Catholic
- Archdiocese: Ottawa
- Installed: 1940
- Term ended: 1953
- Predecessor: Joseph-Guillaume-Laurent Forbes
- Successor: Marie-Joseph Lemieux

Personal details
- Born: August 16, 1885 Saint-Raymond, Quebec
- Died: March 30, 1953 (aged 67) Ottawa, Ontario

Alexandre Vachon (August 16, 1885 – March 30, 1953) was a Canadian Roman Catholic priest who served as the Archbishop of Ottawa and the chancellor of the University of Ottawa from 1940 to 1953.

Academic offices
Preceded by Joseph-Guillaume-Laurent Forbes	Chancellor of the University of Ottawa; 1940-1953	Succeeded by Marie-Joseph Lemieux
