= Notre-Dame Cathedral Basilica =

- Notre-Dame Cathedral Basilica
- 45.42971°N 75.69646°W
- Location: 385 Sussex Drive; Ottawa, Ontario; K1N 1J9
- Country: Canada
- Denomination: Roman Catholic
- Website: www.notredameottawa.com

History
- Status: Cathedral, minor basilica (from 1879)

Architecture
- Functional status: Active
- Heritage designation: National Historic Site
- Designated: 1990
- Architectural type: church
- Style: Neoclassical; Gothic Revival
- Years built: 1841–1865; 1876–1885 (interior)

Specifications
- Capacity: 944 (up to 1,544 with second floor balcony)

Administration
- Archdiocese: Ottawa-Cornwall

Clergy
- Archbishop: Most Rev. Marcel Damphousse
- Abbot

National Historic Site of Canada
- Official name: Notre-Dame Roman Catholic Basilica National Historic Site of Canada
- Designated: 1990

Ontario Heritage Act
- Type: Municipal Heritage Designation (Part IV)
- Designated: 1978
- Rector: Fr. Jacques Kabangu

The Notre-Dame Cathedral Basilica is a Roman Catholic minor basilica in Ottawa, Ontario, Canada located on 385 Sussex Drive in the Lower Town neighbourhood. It was designated a National Historic Site of Canada in 1990.

The basilica is the oldest and largest church in Ottawa and the seat of the city's Roman Catholic archbishop. Its twin spires and gilded Madonna are easily identifiable from nearby Parliament Hill and the surrounding area. The church was last renovated and restored in the late 1990s. Services are held in both French and English. Its Easter and Christmas masses are telecast nationally on Salt+Light Television every year.

== History ==
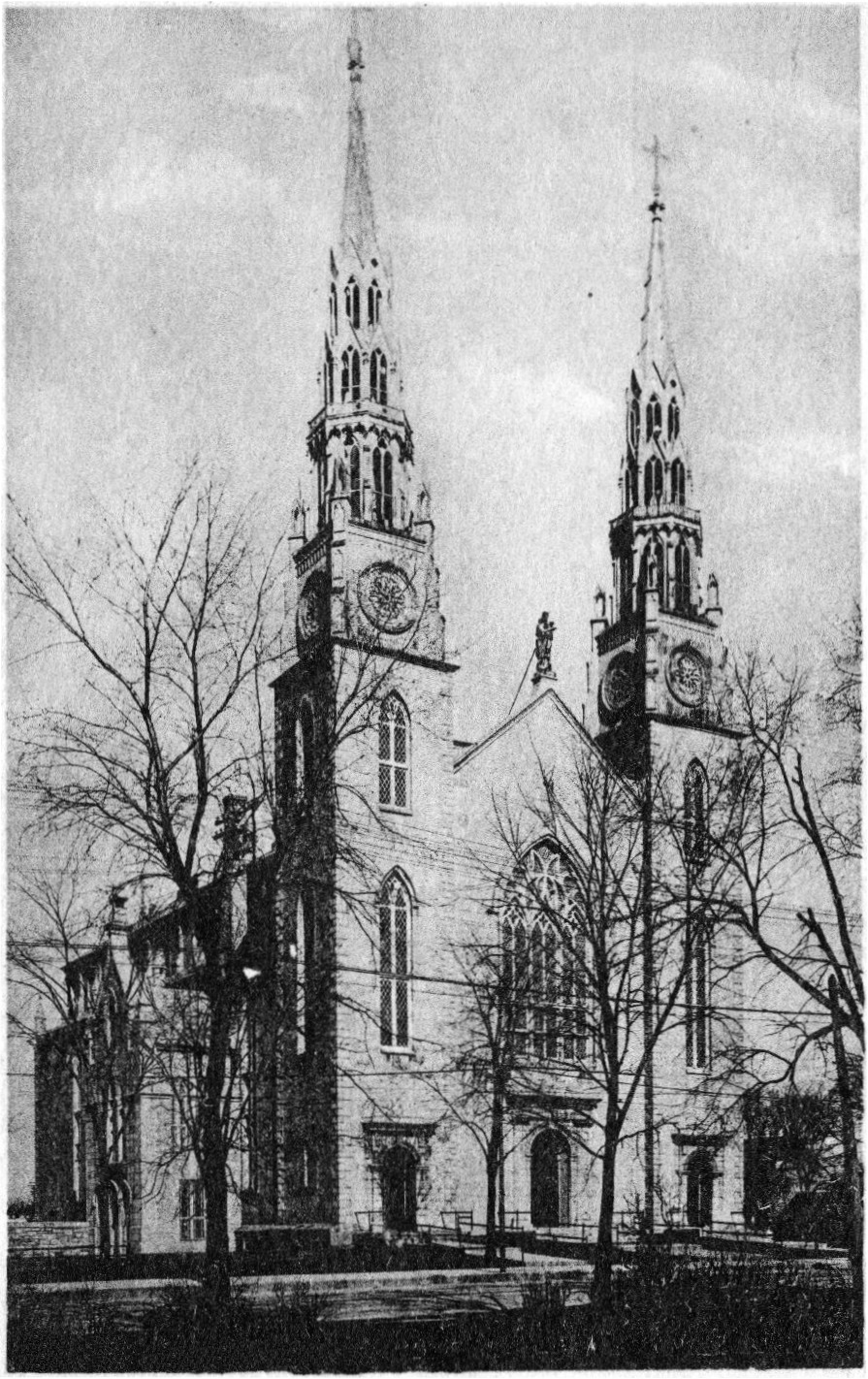
Ottawa Basilica in 1920

The site was originally home to the small wooden St. Jacques Church built in 1832. This structure was moved across the street in 1841 to make way for a larger church and two years later was destroyed by a fire. This larger church was designed by local builder Antoine Robillard and Father John Francis Cannon who requested a Neo-classical design. However, in 1844, after the lower section was completed, the Oblate Fathers (OMI) assumed stewardship of the parish and Father Pierre-Adrien Telmon was sent from France to finish the construction. Father Telmon decided to redesign the church into a Neo-Gothic structure, a style which was growing in popularity. This resulted in the lower features, such as the main entrance, being Neo-Classical, while the upper portions of the structure are Neo-Gothic.

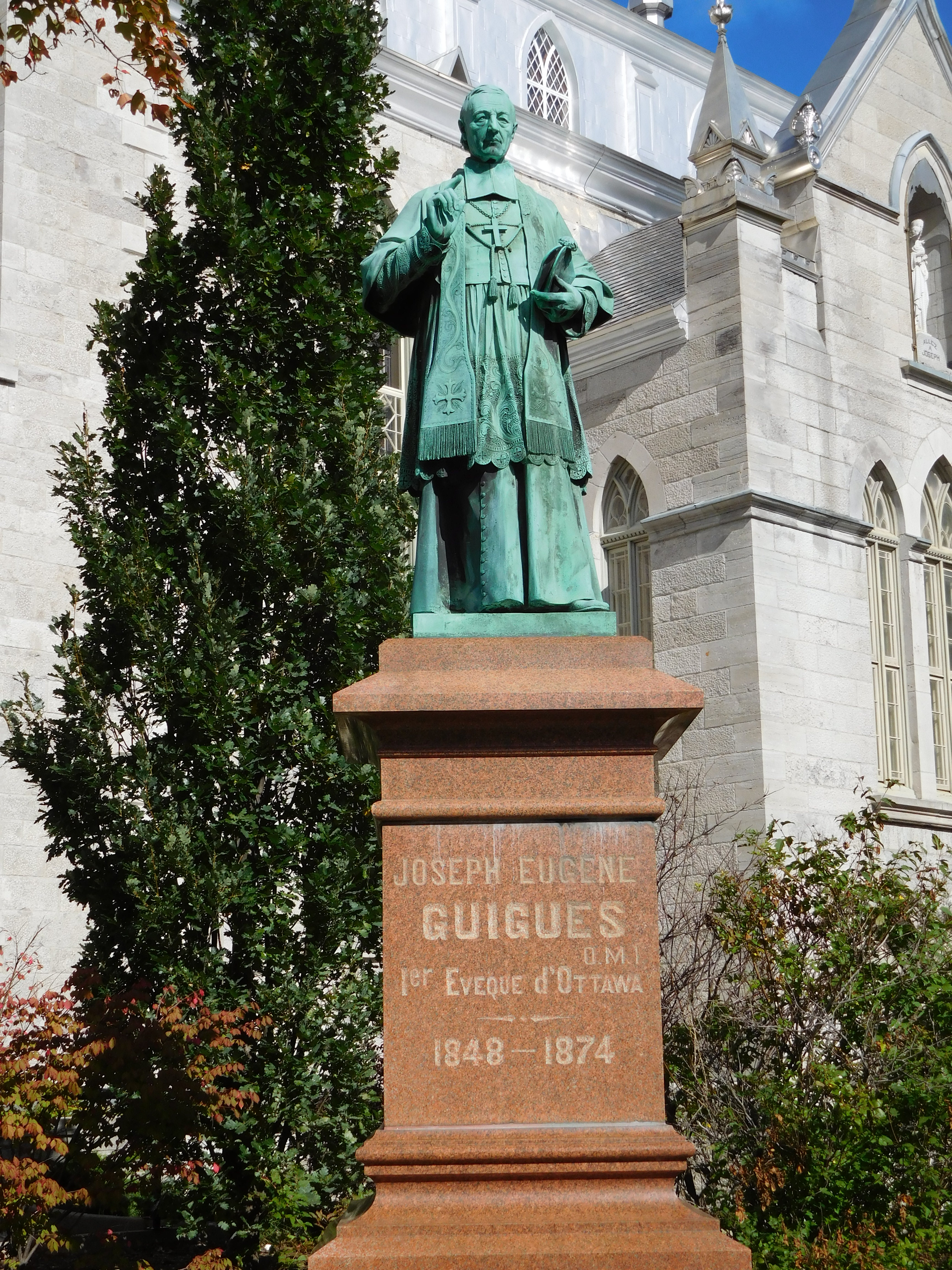
Statue of Joseph-Bruno Guigues, the first Bishop of Bytown, at the basilica

The main structure was completed in 1846. In 1847, the church was designated the cathedral of Bytown and Joseph-Bruno Guigues was appointed the first bishop. He is honoured with a life-size statue at the southwest corner of the cathedral grounds. In 1859, Father Damase Dandurand, OMI, designed the two Gothic spires which were added to the west front in 1866. Earlier, in 1849–50, he designed the Archbishop's Palace and in 1862–63, added the choir loft. In 1879, Pope Leo XIII designated the cathedral as a minor basilica.

James R. Bowes, architect, designed new galleries and other improvements in 1875.

Governor General Georges Vanier and Prime Minister Sir Wilfrid Laurier both were given state funerals at the cathedral.

A plaque commemorating the history of the cathedral was later erected near the building. It reads:

"1841–1843 - This Gothic revival structure is the oldest surviving church in Ottawa. Its twin steeples were erected in 1842. In 1848 it was named the Cathedral of the Diocese of Ottawa, then later was granted the title Basilica. Its chief glory is its carved and painted interior. Designated heritage property 1978."

"On Dec 18, 1999, the most reverend Marcel A Gervais, Archbishop of Ottawa officially reopened Notre Dame Cathedral. The Cathedral had been closed for renovations since the beginning of 1999 and work continued into the year 2000. This historic restoration was made possible through the generous gifts of anonymous donors, the Canada Millenium partnership program, the Ontario Government and the friends of the Cathedral. We also recognize the warm hospitality of the Sisters of Charity of Ottawa who welcomed the community at the Chapel of their Mother House while the Cathedral was closed."

== Design ==
The church contains bench seating for 1,544 people, which includes the second floor balcony when it is open for larger masses. The steeples are covered with tin, which is typical for French-Canadian churches, and house a peal of bells. The exterior is fairly reserved, but the interior is far more ornate, designed by Georges Buillon.

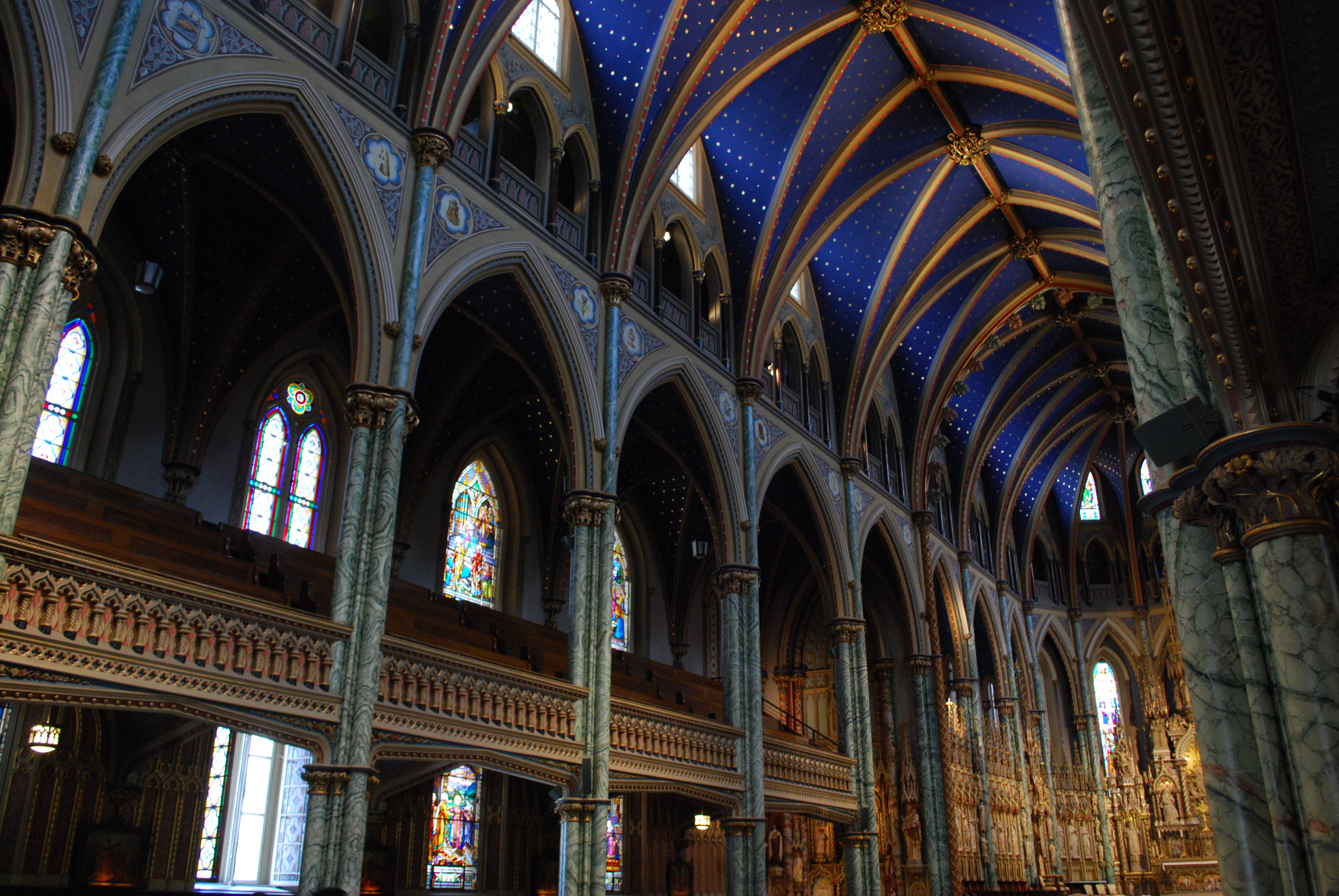
The basilica is decorated with a number of stained-glass windows

The interior of the church is brightly painted and decorated with carved features, exquisite stained glass windows and hundreds of statues of various religious figures. Louis-Philippe Hébert completed thirty large wooden sculptures in the choir. At the end of the choir, the Holy Family is completed with saints John the Baptist and Patrick, the patron saints of French and Irish Catholics.

=== Organs ===
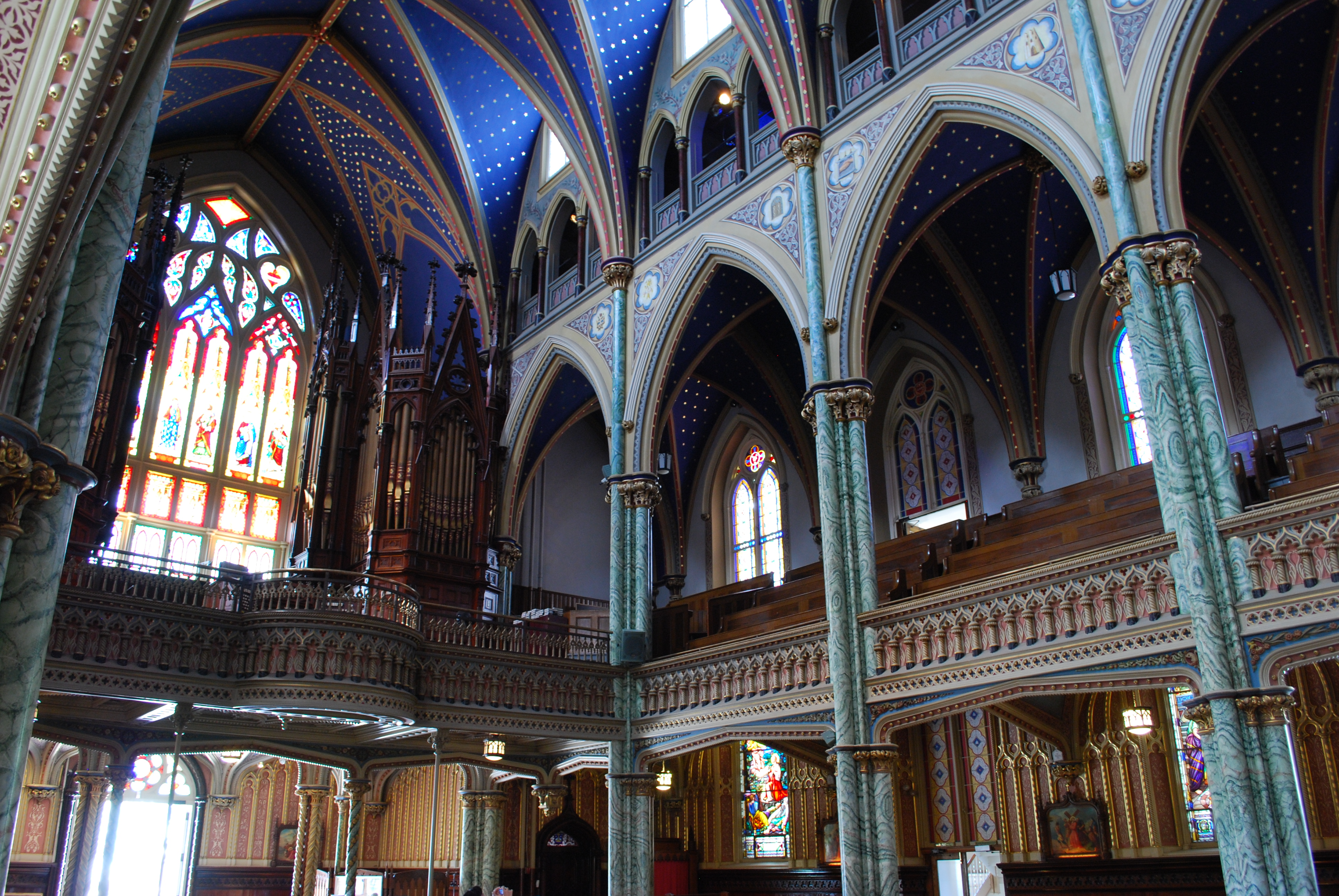
A pipe organ in the gallery above the entrance.

The first organ was inaugurated on March 7, 1850, by Damis Paul, organist at Montreal's cathedral. The instrument had been partially installed in 1848 for Bishop Guigues' consecration. Joseph Casavant built an 18-stop instrument (1,063 pipes) and placed it in a case that was later sculpted by Flavien Rochon in 1871. The instrument was restored by organ builder Louis Mitchell a few years later. Casavant's sons completely reconstructed the organ in 1892. At that time, it was a 52-stop instrument with over 3 manuals and pedal. The instrument used an electro-pneumatic action. The main section of the organ is located in the rear gallery while a second organ, a 17-stop choir organ over 3 manuals and pedal, is located in a gallery over the sanctuary. Both organs are played from the console located in the rear gallery. This instrument is considered one of the three outstanding instruments in the history of the Casavant firm, the others being the one in Notre Dame Basilica in Montreal (1890) and the one in St. Hyacinthe Cathedral (1885).

Originally the console was attached to the left organ case. From the very beginning, the organ case was divided into two sections in order to free the magnificent stained-glass window. New stops were added in 1917. A second console, more modern, was installed in 1940 when a major renovation was undertaken and, in 1975, a revision of the electric action was carried out.

In 1999, Guilbault-Thérien carried out a major renovation, replacing the second console, and adding 7 more stops in order to achieve a better balance amongst the divisions while respecting the symphonic aesthetics of the instrument. The chancel organ still retains its original composition and voicing.

Composer Amédée Tremblay notably served as the church's organist from 1894 to 1920. The present titular organist is Jennifer Loveless.

== See also ==
- List of designated heritage properties in Ottawa
