= Joseph-Guillaume-Laurent Forbes =

Canadian Catholic archbishop (1865–1940)

His Excellency Joseph-Guillaume-Laurent Forbes
- Archbishop of Ottawa
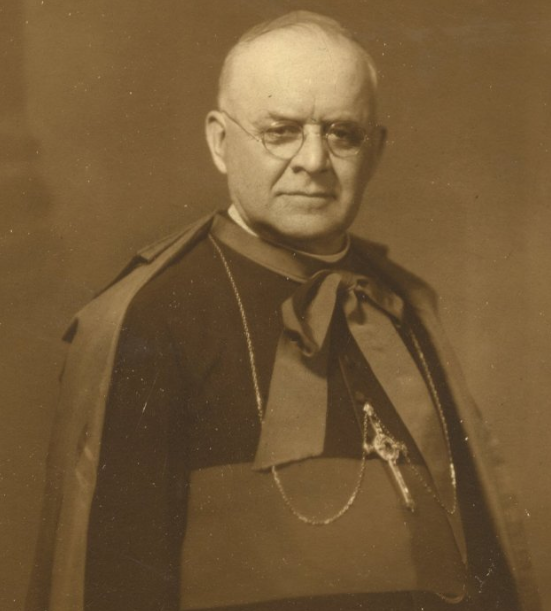
- Church: Catholic Church
- Archdiocese: Ottawa
- Installed: 1928
- Term ended: 1940
- Predecessor: Joseph-Médard Émard
- Successor: Alexandre Vachon

Personal details
- Born: August 10, 1865 Lower Canada
- Died: May 22, 1945 (aged 79) Ottawa, Ontario

Joseph-Guillaume-Laurent Forbes (August 10, 1865-May 22, 1940) was a Canadian Catholic priest and the Archbishop of Ottawa.

Forbes was born on August 10, 1865, probably in Île Perrot, Lower Canada. He was the second of 16 children, and in 1869 moved to Montreal with his family. He did his theological training at the Grand Séminaire de Montréal and was ordained a priest by Édouard-Charles Fabre in 1888. In 1913 he was appointed the Bishop of Joliette, and in 1928, he was appointed the Archbishop of Ottawa. He was the Archbishop of Ottawa and the Chancellor of the University of Ottawa until his death on May 22, 1940.
