= Jean Gaudreau =

Canadian artist and engraver (born 1964)

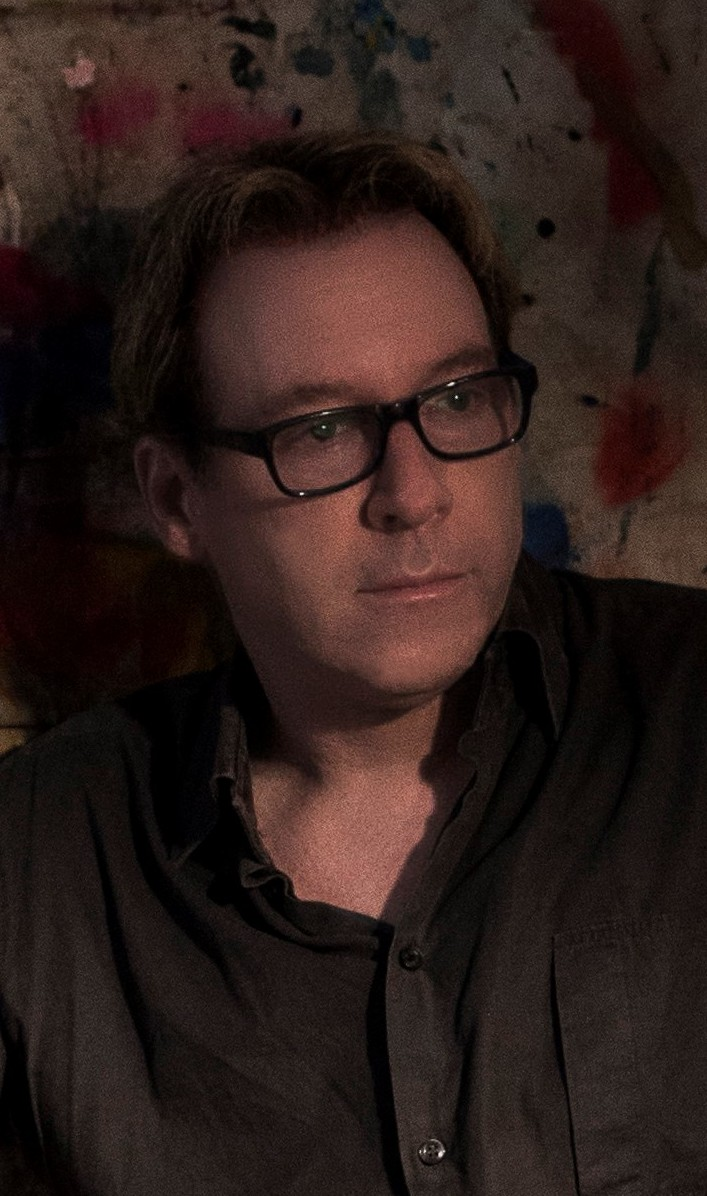
- Jean Gaudreau in his studio in 2015
- Born: May 27, 1964 (age 62); Quebec City, Quebec
- Education: Laval University
- Known for: Painting
- Style: Postmodernism
- Movement: Automatisme; Abstract Art
- Awards: Le Moulin à images Cirque du Soleil

Jean Gaudreau (born May 27, 1964) is a Canadian artist, painter, and engraver.

== Biography ==
Jean Gaudreau was born in Quebec City, Quebec, Canada. At age 10, he studied drawing at the Séminaire des Pères Maristes. He learned traditional techniques, such as Mezzotint, and the role of geometry in drawing.

At 12, he painted Quebec's old port. The painting depicted stevedores, boats, docks, the river, and the cap Diamant. His paintings during this period showed influences from countryside landscape artists.

As a teen, he studied under Jean Paul Lemieux and held his first solo exhibition at 17. He later worked with copper from Château Frontenac's South turret remains.

== Reactions ==
According to Robert Bernier, "Chance encounters and the spirit of his artistic production have led Gaudreau to associate dance and performance art with his painting for many years. Both through the themes he explores and in the organization of events, the body has become central to his work."

Nathalie Côté has said "He is without a doubt, a singular figure of the Quebec visual arts world."

Juliette Laurent said, "The brush strokes recall Riopelle, Pollock, Stella, Klimt and Ferron; some traces evoke the Automatists and the flights dear to lyrical abstracts." Admittedly, the artist employs a postmodern approach that tends integrates various styles, evident in the inclusion of both figurative and non-figurative elements, depictions of women with sensual expressions, sinuous lines, and the juxtaposition of vibrant colors with gilding. His painting's predominant gestural quality and its intentionally unfinished, primal nature are attempts to forge a personal style."

In 2008, Gaudreau was presented as one of the figures of Quebec's contemporary art scene by Robert Lepage during the celebrations for the 400th anniversary of the foundation of Quebec City. In his animated film Le Moulin à images, Lepage projected images of artworks by Gaudreau next to works from Jean Paul Lemieux, Martin Bureau, Jean-Paul Riopelle, and Alfred Pellan among others, on grain silos located in Anse au Foulon in Quebec City's old port.

== Video documents ==
- Belco, J: Jean Gaudreau – Environnement de création, 2010
- Lacerte, Louis: Jean Gaudreau – Moulin à images, 2014
- Roberge, Josiane: Balise du Temps, 2015
- Roberge, Josiane: Court métrage – Tambours flambeaux, 201

== Private and public collections ==
- Musée du Bas-Saint-Laurent
- Cirque du Soleil
- Québécor Média
- Loto-Québec
- Feel Europe Group
- Quebec City
- Laval University
- Sherbrooke University
- Groupe TVA
- Alcan
- TD Bank
- Premier Tech
- Laurier Museum

== Bibliography ==
- Robert, Guy (1990). Jean Gaudreau : expressivité dans un nouveau monde. Catalogue on the 1979–1990 retrospective (in French). Quebec: Éditions Malibu. p. 9.
- Bélanger, Jacques (2009). Le pied au plancher / Feet on the Floor (in French and English). Translated by Ratcliffe, Abigail. Photography, Simon Clark. Quebec: MC Communications. ISBN 978-2-9806728-1-1.
- Zÿlbeck (2015). Jean Gaudreau, au coeur de nos vies (in French and English). Translated by Millar, Christine. MC Communications.
- Motulsky-Falardeau, Alexandre (2014). Jean Gaudreau, ERVIUC (in French and English). Translated by Ratcliffe, Abigail. MC Communications. ISBN 978-2-9806728-2-8.
- Côté, Nathalie (2007). Jean Gaudreau : cycle de vie / Life Cycle. Cycle de vie, Parcours 1995–2007 (in French and English). Translated by Hamilton, Grant. Photography, Pierre Soulard. Quebec.
- Bernier, Robert (2002). La peinture au Québec depuis les années 1960. Montreal: Les éditions de l'homme. pp. 218–219. ISBN 2-7619-1566-6.
