= Joseph-Eugène Limoges =

Catholic archbishop

Monseigneur Joseph-Eugène Limoges (November 15, 1879 – March 1, 1965) was a Canadian prelate who was Bishop of Mont-Laurier, Québec from 1922 to 1965.

Born in Sainte-Scholastique, Quebec, he was ordained in 1902. Appointed bishop by Pius XI, he was consecrated by Bishop Joseph-Médard Émard. He died in 1965.
