= Roman Catholic Diocese of Alexandria–Cornwall =

Catholic ecclesiastical territory

Coordinates: 45.3100°N 74.6324°W

Diocese of Alexandria–Cornwall Dioecesis Alexandrina–Cornubiensis
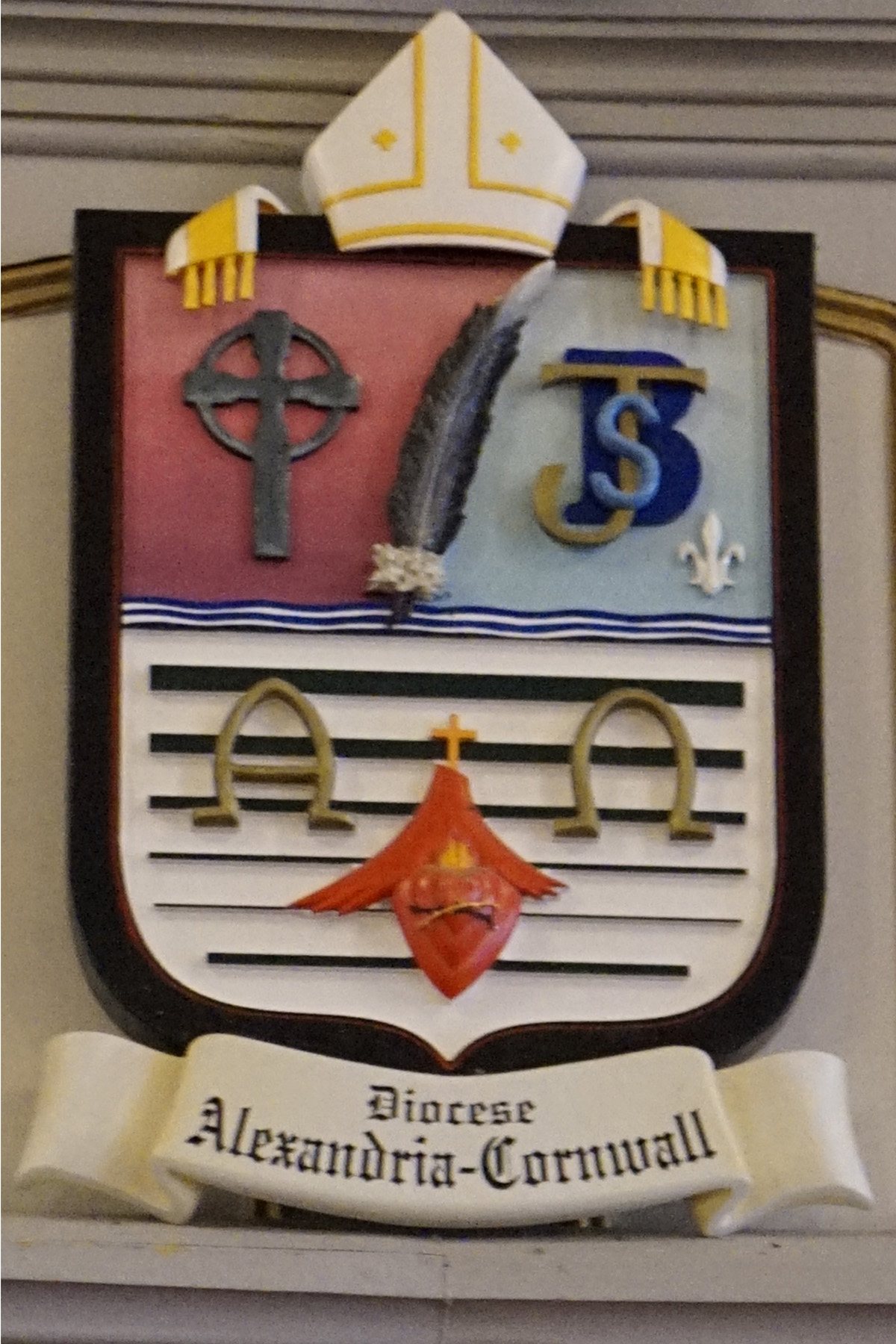

Location
- Country: Canada
- Territory: St. Lawrence Valley
- Population: 56,600 (62.2%)

Information
- Denomination: Catholic
- Sui iuris church: Latin Church
- Rite: Roman Rite
- Established: January 23, 1890
- Cathedral: St. Finnan's Cathedral, Alexandria
- Co-cathedral: Co-cathédrale de la Nativité, Cornwall
- Patron saint: St. Finnan

Current leadership
- Pope: Leo XIV
- Bishop: Marcel Damphousse

Website
- alexandria-cornwall.ca

The Roman Catholic Diocese of Alexandria–Cornwall (Latin: Dioecesis Alexandrina–Cornubiensis) was a Roman Catholic diocese that comprised the easternmost part of the Province of Ontario. The diocese was created by Pope Leo XIII on January 23, 1890. It has also previously operated under the name the Roman Catholic Diocese of Alexandria in Ontario. On May 6, 2020 the diocese was amalgamated with the Archdiocese of Ottawa to form the Roman Catholic Archdiocese of Ottawa–Cornwall.

The see of Alexandria-Cornwall was vacant following the appointment of then-bishop Marcel Damphousse as the Bishop of Sault Sainte Marie on November 12, 2015. Archbishop Terrence Thomas Prendergast of the Archdiocese of Ottawa, was appointed Apostolic Administrator on January 13, 2016, and became Bishop of Alexandria-Cornwall on April 27, 2018, while remaining Archbishop of Ottawa. The two dioceses were united "in persona episcopi" ("in the person of the Bishop"). On December 12, 2018, Pope Francis named Guy Desrochers as Titular Bishop of Melzi and Auxiliary Bishop of Alexandria-Cornwall (with episcopal ordination to take place in St. Finnan's Cathedral, Alexandria on February 22, 2019).

As of 2004, the diocese contained 32 parishes, 36 active diocesan priests, 9 religious priests, and 56,000 Catholics. It also had 32 Women Religious, 13 Religious Brothers, and 16 permanent deacons.

== Bishops ==
The following is a list of the bishops of Alexandria-Cornwall, and their terms of service:

- Alexander Macdonell (1890-1905)
- William Andrew Macdonell (1906-1920)
- Félix Couturier (1921-1941)
- Rosario L. Brodeur (1941-1966)
- Adolphe E. Proulx (1967-1974)
- Eugène Philippe LaRocque (1974–2002)
- Paul-André Durocher (2002–2011), appointed Archbishop of Gatineau, Québec
- Marcel Damphousse (2012–2015), appointed Bishop of Sault Sainte Marie, Ontario
- Terrence Prendergast (2015-2018 as Apostolic Administrator, 2018–2020 as bishop)

=== Coadjutor bishop ===
- Rosario L. Brodeur (1941)

=== Auxiliary bishops ===
- Jacques Landriault (1962-1964), appointed Bishop of Hearst, Ontario
- Joseph-Aurèle Plourde (1964-1967), appointed Archbishop of Ottawa, Ontario
- Guy Desrochers (2018-2020), appointed Bishop of Pembroke, Ontario

=== Other priest of this diocese who became bishop ===
- Joseph Luc André Bouchard, appointed Bishop of Saint Paul in Alberta in 2001
