= Charles-Hugues Gauthier =

Canadian Catholic priest

His Excellency Charles-Hugues Gauthier
- Archbishop of Ottawa
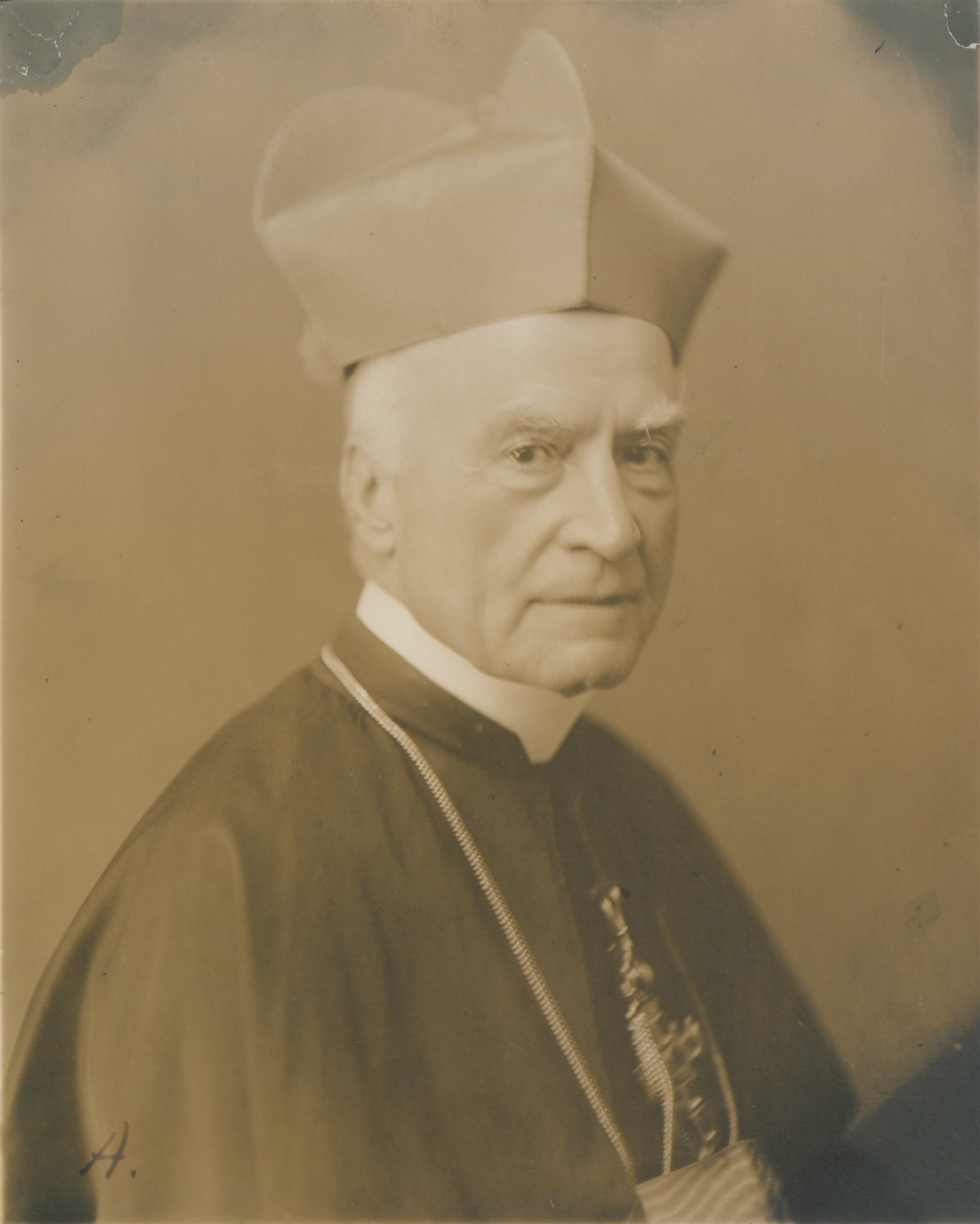
- Church: Catholic Church
- Archdiocese: Ottawa
- Installed: 1911
- Term ended: 1922
- Predecessor: Joseph-Thomas Duhamel
- Successor: Joseph-Médard Émard

Personal details
- Born: November 13, 1843 Alexandria, Upper Canada
- Died: January 19, 1922 (aged 78) Ottawa, Ontario

Charles-Hughes Gauthier (November 13, 1843 - January 19, 1922) was a Canadian Catholic Priest who served as the Archbishop of Kingston and Ottawa.

Born in Alexandria, Upper Canada, he was of Scottish and French Canadian parentage. He graduated from Regiopolis College with high honours in 1863 and later studied theology at the Grand Seminaire, in Montreal. Gauthier was ordained a priest in 1867, and in 1898 was ordained as the archbishop of Kingston. He was the Archbishop of Ottawa and the Chancellor of the University of Ottawa from 1911 until his death in 1922.

Academic offices
Preceded by Joseph-Thomas Duhamel	Chancellor of the University of Ottawa; 1911-1922	Succeeded by Joseph-Médard Émard
