= Joseph-Médard Émard =

Canadian archbishop (1853–1927)

His Excellency Joseph-Médard Émard
- Archbishop of Ottawa
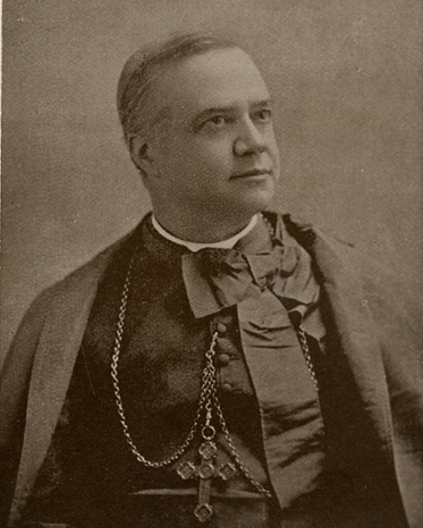
- Archdiocese: Ottawa
- Installed: 1922
- Term ended: 1927
- Predecessor: Charles-Hugues Gauthier
- Successor: Joseph-Guillaume-Laurent Forbes
- Other post: Bishop of Valleyfield (1892-1922)

Personal details
- Born: 31 March 1853 Saint-Constant, Lower Canada
- Died: 28 March 1927 (aged 73) Ottawa, Ontario

Joseph-Médard Émard (31 March 1853 – 28 March 1927) was a Canadian Roman Catholic priest, professor, and Archbishop of Ottawa.

Catholic Church titles
Preceded by Diocese erected in 1892.	Bishop of Valleyfield; 1892–1922	Succeeded by Felix-Raymond-Marie Rouleau
Academic offices
Preceded by Charles-Hugues Gauthier	Chancellor of the University of Ottawa; 1922–1927	Succeeded by Joseph-Guillaume-Laurent Forbes
