= Jean Gratton =

Catholic bishop of the Diocese of Mont-Laurier, Canada

Jean Gratton (December 4, 1924 – April 14, 2011) was the Catholic bishop of the Diocese of Mont-Laurier, Canada.

Ordained to the priesthood in 1952, Gratton was named bishop in 1978. Bishop Gratton retired in 2001.
