= Marcel Damphousse =

Canadian Catholic archbishop (born 1963)

His Grace Marcel Damphousse
- Archbishop of Ottawa–Cornwall
- Church: Latin Church
- Appointed: 6 May 2020
- Predecessor: Terrence Prendergast
- Previous post: Bishop of Sault Sainte Marie, Ontario (2016–2020)

Orders
- Ordination: 28 June 1991
- Consecration: 2 September 2012 by Brendan Michael O'Brien

Personal details
- Born: Marcel Damphousse; 19 March 1963 (age 63) Saint-Joseph, Manitoba, Canada
- Denomination: Catholic
- Coat of arms

Marcel Damphousse (born 19 March 1963) is a Canadian archbishop of the Catholic Church. Prior to becoming Archbishop of the Archdiocese of Ottawa–Cornwall, he was Bishop of the Diocese of Sault Sainte Marie, Ontario from 2016 to 2020, and of the Diocese of Alexandria-Cornwall from 2012 to 2015.

== Education ==
Damphousse earned a bachelor's degree in psychology from the University College of Saint-Boniface in 1984, and then earned a bachelor's degree in theology from Saint Paul University in Ottawa in 1989. In 2002, he earned a licentiate in spiritual theology from the Teresianum in Rome.

== Career ==
Damphousse was ordained on 28 June 1991 for the Archdiocese of Saint-Boniface. He served at several parishes and was vocations director as well as chaplain at Saint-Boniface Diocesan High School before being appointed Rector of the Saint Boniface Cathedral in 2008. He also taught at the Manitoba Catholic School of Evangelization.

On 28 June 2012, Pope Benedict XVI appointed the Damphousse Bishop of Alexandria-Cornwall. He was ordained bishop on 2 September 2012 in St. Finnan's Basilica.

On 12 November 2015, Pope Francis appointed Damphousse Bishop of Sault Ste. Marie.

On 6 May 2020, he was named the coadjutor archbishop of the Archdiocese of Ottawa-Cornwall. He succeeded Terrence Prendergast following the latter's retirement on 3 December 2020.

Catholic Church titles
Preceded by Terrence Prendergast	Archbishop of Ottawa–Cornwall; 2020–present	Succeeded by Incumbent
