= Paul-André Durocher =

Canadian Catholic bishop (b. 1954)

The Most Reverend Paul-André Durocher
- Archbishop of Gatineau
- Church: Catholic Church
- See: Archdiocese of Gatineau
- In office: 2011–present
- Predecessor: Roger Ébacher
- Previous post: Bishop of Alexandria-Cornwall

Orders
- Ordination: July 2, 1982
- Consecration: March 14, 1997 by Jean-Louis Plouffe
- Rank: Archbishop

Personal details
- Born: May 28, 1954 (age 72) Windsor, Ontario, Canada
- Coat of arms

Paul-André Durocher (born May 28, 1954) is a Canadian bishop of the Catholic Church.

== Life and career ==
Paul-André Durocher was born in Windsor, Ontario, on May 28, 1954. He was ordained a priest for the Roman Catholic Diocese of Timmins, Ontario, on July 2, 1982.

Pope John Paul II appointed Durocher Auxiliary Bishop of Sault Sainte Marie, Ontario, on January 20, 1997, and designated him as the titular bishop of Ausuaga. Durocher's episcopal consecration took place on March 14, 1997, with Bishop Jean-Louis Plouffe as the principal consecrator.

On April 27, 2002, Durocher was appointed Bishop of Alexandria-Cornwall, Ontario.

On October 12, 2011, Pope Benedict XVI appointed Durocher as Archbishop of Gatineau, Quebec. Archbishop Durocher was installed on November 30, 2011. He participated in the Third Extraordinary General Assembly of the Synod of Bishops, where he advocated the ordination of women to the diaconate.
