= Séminaire des Pères Maristes =

Location
- 2315, chemin Saint-Louis; Quebec City, Quebec, G1T 1R5; Canada; 46°46′12″N 71°15′37″W

Information
- School type: Private school
- Motto: Être mariste, c'est vivre en harmonie et goûter au succès! (Being marist means living in harmony and getting a taste of success!)
- Founded: 1929
- Principal: François Sylvain
- Grades: Secondary I-V (7-11)
- Enrollment: 680
- Language: French
- Website: www.spmaristes.qc.ca

The Séminaire des Pères Maristes (SPM) is a private, coeducational high school in Quebec City, Quebec, Canada. It is situated on the heights of Sillery and run by a team of Marist Fathers and laymen.

== History ==
It is in 1929 that the Marists Fathers founded the Seminary. (Note: In this article, "Seminary" is used as the literal translation of "Séminaire" and does not signify that this high school is a clerical institution.) They brought it on an old educational tradition of more than a century. Established at first as an apostolic school, the Seminary widened its objectives and opened more widely to the public in the middle of the 1960s. In 1986, the social changes and the evolution of its clientele brought the school to accept only external students. In autumn, 1990, with the opening of every year of the secondary to the girls, the Seminary admits in its walls all the young people of the region who look for its services for an intellectual, human and Christian quality formation. In June 2002, the Seminary inaugurated a new building which allowed the school to meet the needs better, by being equipped with specific infrastructures for the plastic arts, the music and the artistic production. In 2004, new spaces are fitted out with the repair of the facade of the main building. Then, in May 2007, the addition of a second gym and a training room comes to reaffirm the place granted to sports and health within the Seminary. In 2011–12, new classrooms were added above the first gymnasium; thus making space for more students.

In 2008, the principal of the Seminary Jean Blais retired and was replaced in August by Jean-François Bussières. There were now three principals at school, one for pedagogical services, one for student services and one for general services.

In May 2018, 6 male students were arrested for sharing explicit photos of minors.
