= Archdiocese of Ottawa–Cornwall =

Catholic ecclesiastical territory

Archdiocese of Ottawa–Cornwall Archidioecesis Ottaviensis–Cornubiensis Archidiocèse d'Ottawa-Cornwall
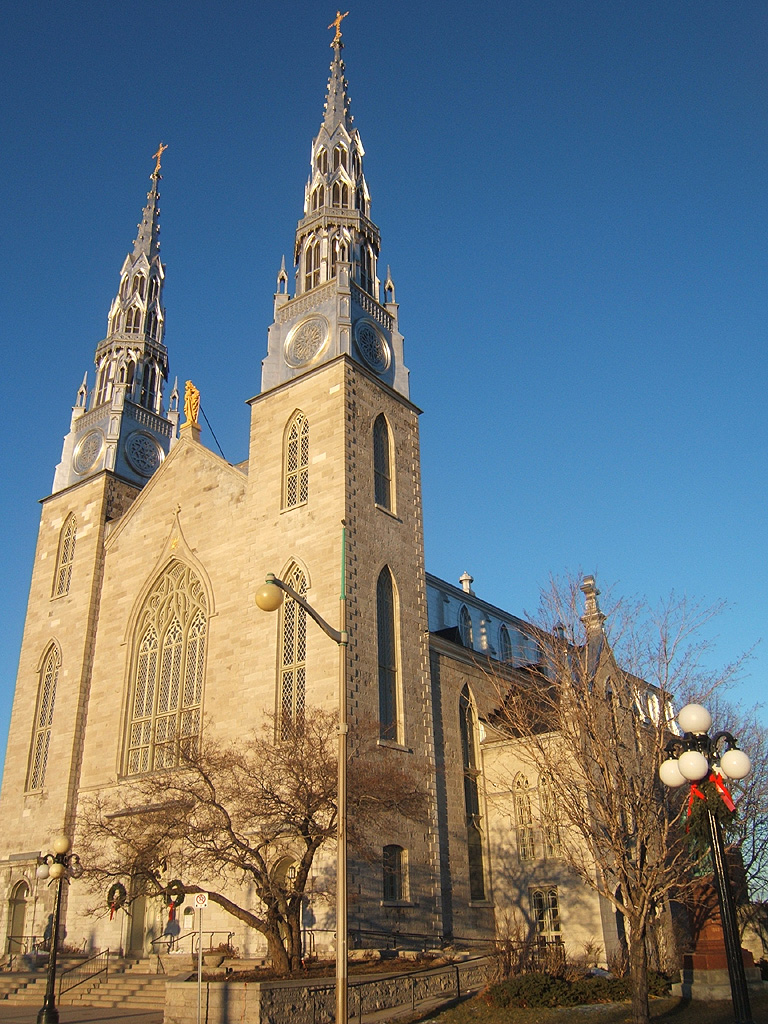
- Notre-Dame Cathedral Basilica in Ottawa

- Logo of the diocese

Location
- Country: Canada
- Territory: City of Ottawa; United Counties of Prescott and Russell; Eastern portion of the United Counties of Stormont, Dundas and Glengarry; Two parishes in Lanark County
- Ecclesiastical province: Ottawa–Cornwall
- Headquarters: 1209 Michael St N, Ottawa, ON K1J 7T2
- Coordinates: 45°25′21″N 75°37′55″W

Statistics
- Area: 7,108 km^{2} (2,744 sq mi)
- Population: Total; Catholics: (as of 2023); 981,800; 472,000 (47.9%)
- Parishes: 129

Information
- Denomination: Catholic
- Sui iuris church: Latin Church
- Rite: Roman Rite
- Established: June 8, 1886
- Cathedral: Notre-Dame Cathedral Basilica
- Patron saint: Saint Joseph
- Secular priests: 129

Current leadership
- Pope: Leo XIV
- Archbishop: Marcel Damphousse
- Suffragans: Hearst–Moosonee; Pembroke; Timmins
- Auxiliary Bishops: Yvan Mathieu
- Vicar General: Leo Villeneuve
- Bishops emeritus: Terrence Prendergast

Website
- ottawacornwall.ca

The Archdiocese of Ottawa–Cornwall (Latin: Archidioecesis Ottaviensis–Cornubiensis, French: L'Archidiocèse d'Ottawa-Cornwall) is a Catholic archdiocese in the Province of Ontario. It is the metropolitan diocese of the ecclesiastical province of Ottawa–Cornwall which includes the suffragan dioceses of Hearst–Moosonee, Pembroke, and Timmins. As of 2023, the archdiocese had 129 parishes, 129 diocesan priests, 103 religious priests, and 472,000 Catholics. It also had 379 women religious, 110 religious brothers, and 100 permanent deacons.

== History ==
The Diocese of Bytown was erected on June 25, 1847. Its name was changed to the Diocese of Ottawa on June 14, 1860. It was elevated to archdiocese status on June 8, 1886. On May 6, 2020, Pope Francis amalgamated the Archdiocese of Ottawa and the Diocese of Alexandria-Cornwall to create the Archdiocese of Ottawa–Cornwall.

== Territory ==
The archdiocese includes the City of Ottawa, the United Counties of Prescott and Russell, the eastern portion of the United Counties of Stormont, Dundas and Glengarry, as well as a small portion of Lanark County consisting of only two parishes.

== Leadership ==
Bishops and archbishops of Ottawa

- Joseph-Eugène-Bruno Guigues (1847–1874)
- Joseph-Thomas Duhamel (1874–1909)
- Charles-Hugues Gauthier (1910–1922)
- Joseph-Médard Émard (1922–1927)
- Joseph-Guillaume-Laurent Forbes (1928–1940)
- Alexandre Vachon (1940–1953)
- Marie-Joseph Lemieux (1953–1966), appointed titular Archbishop and nuncio
- Joseph-Aurèle Plourde (1967–1989)
- Marcel André J. Gervais (1989–2007)
- Terrence Prendergast, S.J. (2007–2020)

Archbishops of Ottawa-Cornwall

- Terrence Prendergast, S.J. (May 2020 – Dec 2020)
- Marcel Damphousse (2020– )

=== Coadjutor bishops ===
- Alexandre Vachon (1939–1940)
- Marcel André J. Gervais (1989)
- Marcel Damphousse (2020– )

=== Auxiliary bishops ===
- Maxime Tessier (1951–1953), appointed Coadjutor Bishop of Timmins, Ontario
- Paul-Émile Charbonneau (1960–1963), appointed Bishop of Hull, Québec
- Joseph Raymond Windle (1960–1969), appointed Coadjutor Bishop of Pembroke, Ontario
- René Audet (1963–1968), appointed Bishop of Joliette, Québec
- John Michael Behan (1977–1988)
- Gilles Bélisle (1977–1993)
- Brendan Michael O'Brien (1987–1993), appointed Bishop of Pembroke, Ontario
- Paul Marchand, SSM (1993–1999), appointed Bishop of Timmins, Ontario
- Frederick Joseph Colli (1994–1999), appointed Bishop of Thunder Bay, Ontario
- Christian Riesbeck, CC (2014–2019), appointed Bishop of Saint John, New Brunswick
- Yvan Mathieu, S.M. (2022– )

=== Other priests of this diocese who became bishops ===
- John Thomas McNally, appointed Bishop of Calgary, Alberta, in 1913
- François-Xavier Brunet, appointed Bishop of Mont-Laurier, Québec, in 1913
- Joseph Charbonneau, appointed Bishop of Hearst, Ontario in 1939
- Jean Gratton, appointed Bishop of Mont-Laurier, Québec, in 1978
- Jean-Louis Plouffe, appointed Auxiliary Bishop of Sault Sainte Marie, Ontario in 1986
- José Avelino Bettencourt, appointed nuncio and titular archbishop in 2018

== Statistics ==
Year	Population			Priests				Permanent Deacons	Religious		Parishes
Year	Catholics	Total Population	%	Total Priests	Diocesan Priests	Religious priests	Catholics per Priest	Permanent Deacons	Male Religious	Female Religious	Parishes
Archdiocese of Ottawa
1950	241,000	380,000	63.4	689	273	416	349		1,118	1,942	132
1966	210,455	360,000	58.5	560	204	356	375		495	1,630	105
1970	199,985	249,530	80.1	666	196	470	300		680	1,634	98
1976	261,545	516,945	50.6	443	172	271	590	1	409	1,375	100
1980	285,900	575,000	49.7	420	166	254	680	9	393	1,252	100
1990	350,000	677,000	51.7	371	149	222	943	13	326	1,047	112
1999	402,305	805,610	49.9	341	162	179	1,179	40	233	886	113
2000	402,305	805,610	49.9	334	167	167	1,204	49	215	871	113
2001	402,305	805,610	49.9	347	172	175	1,159	47	217	859	113
2002	402,305	812,305	49.5	264	162	102	1,523	50	149	830	113
2003	402,305	812,305	49.5	272	170	102	1,479	51	142	848	113
2004	392,635	812,305	48.3	279	177	102	1,407	60	147	848	111
2013	428,000	892,000	48.0	282	115	167	1,517	86	183	582	107
2016	441,798	922,014	47.9	283	116	167	1,561	86	180	495	107
2019	458,200	956,200	47.9	219	116	103	2,092	91	115	445	107
Diocese of Alexandria in Ontario
1950	42,300	63,500	66.6	50	43	7	846		36	212	29
1959	48,000	69,100	69.5	61	46	15	786		70	240	33
1965	?	77,081	?	75	54	21	?		35	252	32
1970	55,000	78,200	70.3	62	51	11	887		17	220	30
Diocese of Alexandria-Cornwall
1976	51,989	78,731	66.0	56	47	9	928		20	156	31
1980	45,829	81,541	56.2	46	38	8	996	1	18	131	34
1990	56,500	88,000	64.2	48	42	6	1,177	10	16	94	34
1999	56,050	87,388	64.1	36	36		1,556	16	4	65	34
2000	56,050	87,388	64.1	45	35	10	1,245	18	10	66	34
2001	56,050	87,388	64.1	43	34	9	1,303	18	17	61	34
2002	56,050	87,388	64.1	49	39	10	1,143	16	14	55	34
2003	56,050	87,388	64.1	46	37	9	1,218	16	13	55	34
2004	56,050	87,383	64.1	45	36	9	1,245	16	13	32	32
2006	55,675	87,500	63.6	47	40	7	1,184	17	11	24	31
2012	56,600	91,000	62.2	44	32	12	1,286	9	26	22	27
2015	57,400	100,800	56.9	37	34	3	1,551	18	3	20	28
2018	64,780	104,200	62.2	29	27	2	2,233	16	2	20	26
Archdiocese of Ottawa–Cornwall
2021	465,000	967,260	48.1	250	144	106	1,860	108	113	425	128
2023	472,000	981,800	48.1	232	129	103	2,034	100	110	379	129
