= Joseph-Thomas Duhamel =

Canadian Roman Catholic priest

His Excellency Joseph-Thomas Duhamel
- Archbishop of Ottawa
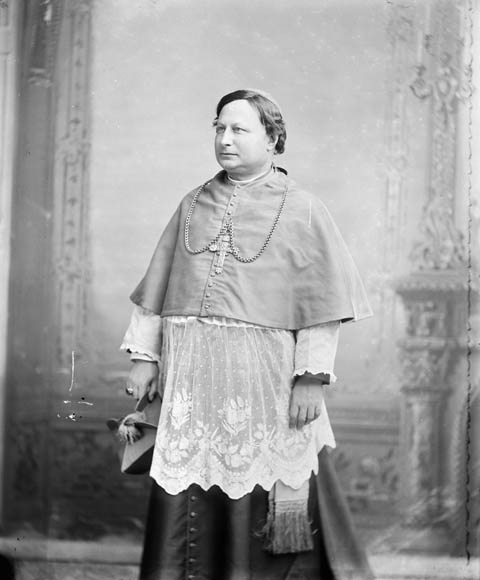
- Joseph-Thomas Duhamel, Feb 1895
- Church: Roman Catholic
- Archdiocese: Ottawa
- Installed: 1874
- Term ended: 1909
- Predecessor: Joseph-Bruno Guigues
- Successor: Charles-Hugues Gauthier

Personal details
- Born: 6 November 1841 Contrecœur, Lower Canada
- Died: 5 June 1909 (aged 67) Casselman, Ontario

Joseph-Thomas Duhamel (French pronunciation: [ʒozɛf tɔma dyamɛl]; 6 November 1841 – 5 June 1909) was a Canadian Roman Catholic priest and Archbishop of Ottawa.

Born in Contrecœur, Lower Canada, he was educated at St. Joseph's College, Ottawa, and ordained in 1863. He became Bishop of Ottawa in 1874 and Archbishop of Ottawa in 1886. In 1887, he became metropolitan of the ecclesiastical province of Ottawa. He was chancellor of the University of Ottawa.

Two municipalities in Quebec, Duhamel and Duhamel-Ouest, as well as one in Alberta Duhamel, Alberta are named after him.

Academic offices
Preceded by New position	Chancellor of the University of Ottawa; 1889–1909	Succeeded by Charles-Hugues Gauthier
