= Joseph-Bruno Guigues =

Joseph-Eugène-Bruno Guigues
- Bishop of Bytown
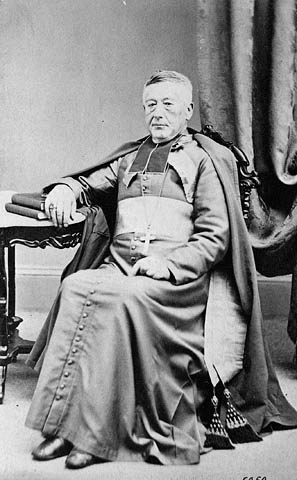
- Joseph Eugene Guigues, R.C. Bishop of Ottawa, 1865
- Installed: 1847
- Term ended: 1874
- Successor: Joseph-Thomas Duhamel

Personal details
- Born: 26 August 1805 Gap, Hautes-Alpes, France
- Died: 8 February 1874 (aged 68) Ottawa, Ontario

Joseph-Eugène-Bruno Guigues (French pronunciation: [ʒozɛf øʒɛn bʁyno ɡiɡ]; 26 August 1805 – 8 February 1874) was an Oblate priest, a teacher and became the first bishop of the diocese of Bytown (Ottawa) serving from (1847–1874). His consecration service in 1848 was performed by Rémi Gaulin, bishop of Kingston.

It was said that he was a simple man and that as bishop, he discharged the duties of parish priest by hearing confession in his cathedral and visiting the sick. He stayed in touch with his diocese, toured it regularly, and made himself available to the people of the parishes.

Two municipalities in Quebec, Saint-Bruno-de-Guigues and Saint-Eugène-de-Guigues, are named after him.
