= Neil McNeil =

Canadian archbishop

The Most Reverend Neil McNeil
- Archbishop of Toronto
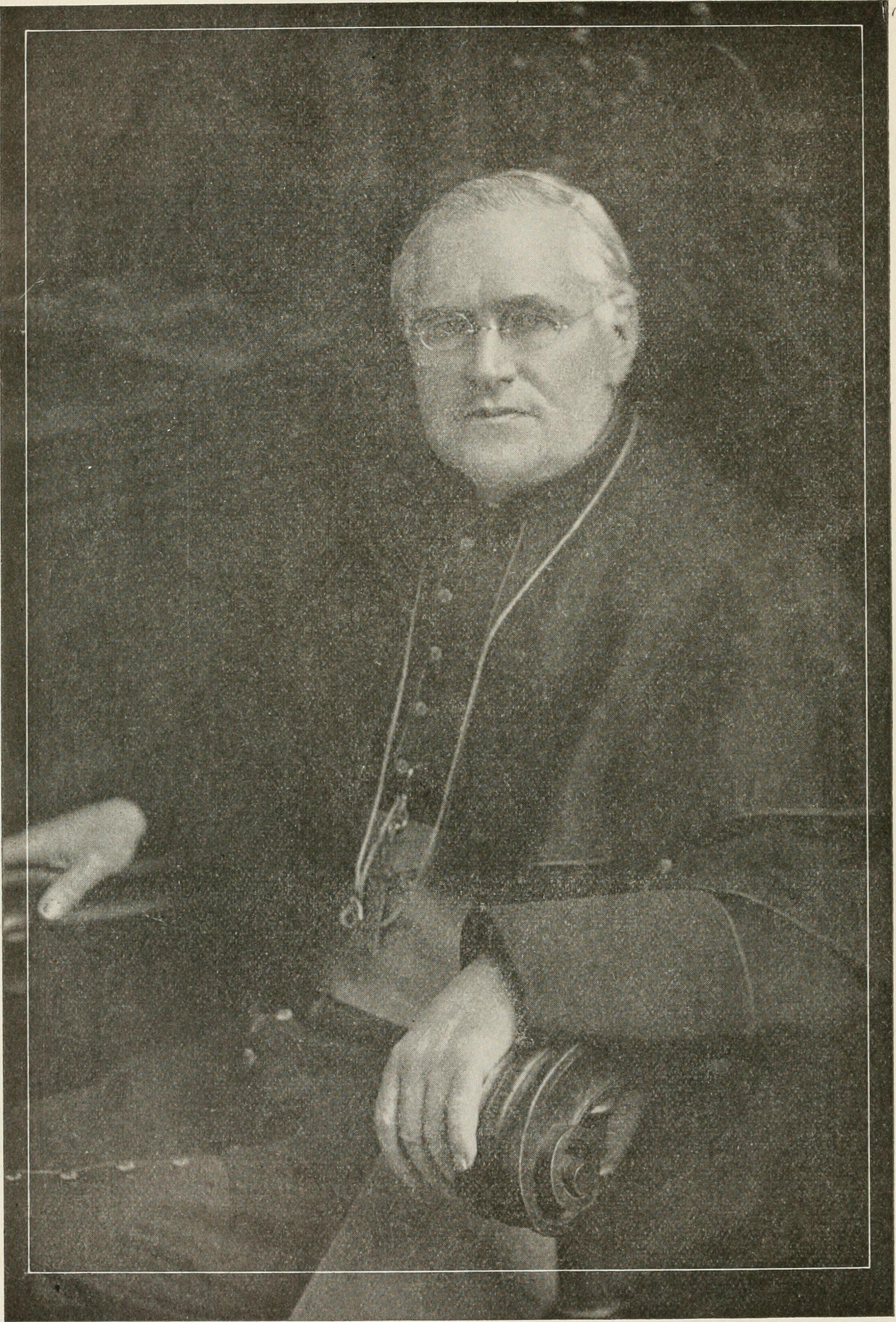
- Church: Catholic Church
- Archdiocese: Toronto
- Appointed: April 10, 1912
- Term ended: May 25, 1934
- Predecessor: Fergus McEvay
- Successor: James McGuigan
- Previous posts: Vicar Apostolic of Western Newfoundland (1895–1904); Bishop of Saint George's (1904–1910); Archbishop of Vancouver (1910–1912)

Orders
- Ordination: April 12, 1879 by Raffaele Monaco La Valletta
- Consecration: October 20, 1895 by John Cameron

Personal details
- Born: November 23, 1851 Inverness County, Nova Scotia, Canada
- Died: May 25, 1934 (aged 82) Toronto, Ontario, Canada

Neil McNeil (November 23, 1851 – May 25, 1934) was a Canadian prelate of the Catholic Church. He served as the first Bishop of Saint George's (1904–1910), the second Archbishop of Vancouver (1910–1912), and the fifth Archbishop of Toronto (1912–1934).

== Early life and education ==
Neil McNeil was born on November 23, 1851, in Hillsborough, near Mabou, in Inverness County, Nova Scotia. He was the eldest of 11 children of Malcolm and Ellen (née Meagher) McNeil. His father worked as a blacksmith and Neil initially trained as an apprentice to him. His uncle, Nicholas Meagher, was a member of the Nova Scotia Supreme Court (1890–1916); his nephew, John Roderick MacDonald, also became a Catholic bishop.

McNeil received his early education at the local school in Hillsborough, and then enrolled at St. Francis Xavier College in Antigonish in 1869. He taught secondary school in Antigonish County in 1872. The following year, Bishop John Cameron, the coadjutor bishop of the Diocese of Antigonish, sent him to study for the priesthood at the Pontificio Collegio Urbano de Propaganda Fide in Rome. He there earned doctorates in theology and philosophy.

== Priesthood ==
While in Rome, McNeil was ordained a priest on April 12, 1879, by Cardinal Raffaele Monaco La Valletta at the Lateran Basilica. He then continued his studies for a year at the University of Marseille in France, where he studied mathematics and astronomy.

Upon his return to Nova Scotia in 1880, McNeil joined the faculty of his alma mater, St. Francis Xavier College in Antigonish. He there taught science and Latin before serving as the college's rector (1884–1891).

In addition to his role as rector, McNeil became editor of The Casket, a weekly newspaper in Antigonish, in 1890. Ahead of the 1891 Canadian federal election, McNeil refused to publish an article by Bishop John Cameron in The Casket on the grounds of political neutrality. Cameron, an outspoken supporter of the Conservative Party, declared that McNeil was "a dyed-in-the-wool Grit." Later that year, Cameron removed McNeil from the college and assigned him to a less prominent role as pastor of Immaculate Conception Church in West Arichat. McNeil protested Cameron's action to the Holy See, writing that "clergy should not get mixed up in these political affairs when the defense of the church or moral principles do not require it."

In 1893, McNeil was transferred to St. Hyacinth Church in D'Escousse, where he remained until becoming a bishop.

== Episcopal career ==
=== Newfoundland ===
On August 6, 1895, McNeil was appointed vicar apostolic of Western Newfoundland and titular bishop of Nilopolis by Pope Leo XIII. He received his episcopal consecration on the following October 20 from Bishop John Cameron at St. Ninian's Cathedral in Antigonish, with Bishops James McDonald and Michael Howley serving as co-consecrators.

The vicariate covered the western coast of Newfoundland, from the Gulf of St. Lawrence to the Strait of Belle Isle. With the advent of the Newfoundland Railway in 1898, McNeil moved the seat of the vicariate from Sandy Point to St. George's. On February 28, 1904, Pope Pius X elevated the vicariate to the Diocese of St. George's and named McNeil its first bishop.

By 1909, the 82-year-old Bishop John Cameron of Antigonish sought a coadjutor bishop with the right of succession. In February of that year, the bishops of the ecclesiastical province of Halifax drew up a terna, or list of three candidates, that included Fathers McNeil, Donald MacAdam of Sydney, and Donald Chisholm of Heatherton. Cameron, who had been opposed to McNeil since his time as editor of The Casket, demanded that McNeil's name be replaced with that of Father Hugh MacPherson of Antigonish. Before a coadjutor could be named, however, Cameron died in 1910 and was eventually succeeded by James Morrison.

=== British Columbia ===
In 1908, Augustin Dontenwill resigned as Archbishop of Vancouver to become superior general of the Missionary Oblates of Mary Immaculate. The French-speaking Oblates, who had managed the local Church for over 40 years, submitted their own terna to the Holy See to retain control of the region. However, the Oblates' terna was contested by the English-speaking secular clergy, led by Bishop Alexander MacDonald and supported by Archbishop Donato Sbarretti, the Apostolic Delegate to Canada. On January 19, 1910, Pope Pius X appointed McNeil as archbishop.

During his brief tenure in Vancouver, McNeil established 13 churches, two convent schools, and a hospital.

=== Ontario ===
After only two years in Vancouver, he became Archbishop of Toronto, Ontario, where he served from 1912 to 1934.

Shortly after being appointed as Archbishop, NcNeil was charged with completing St. Augustine's Seminary and the Canadian Catholic Church Extension Society created by his predecessor Fergus Patrick McEvay.

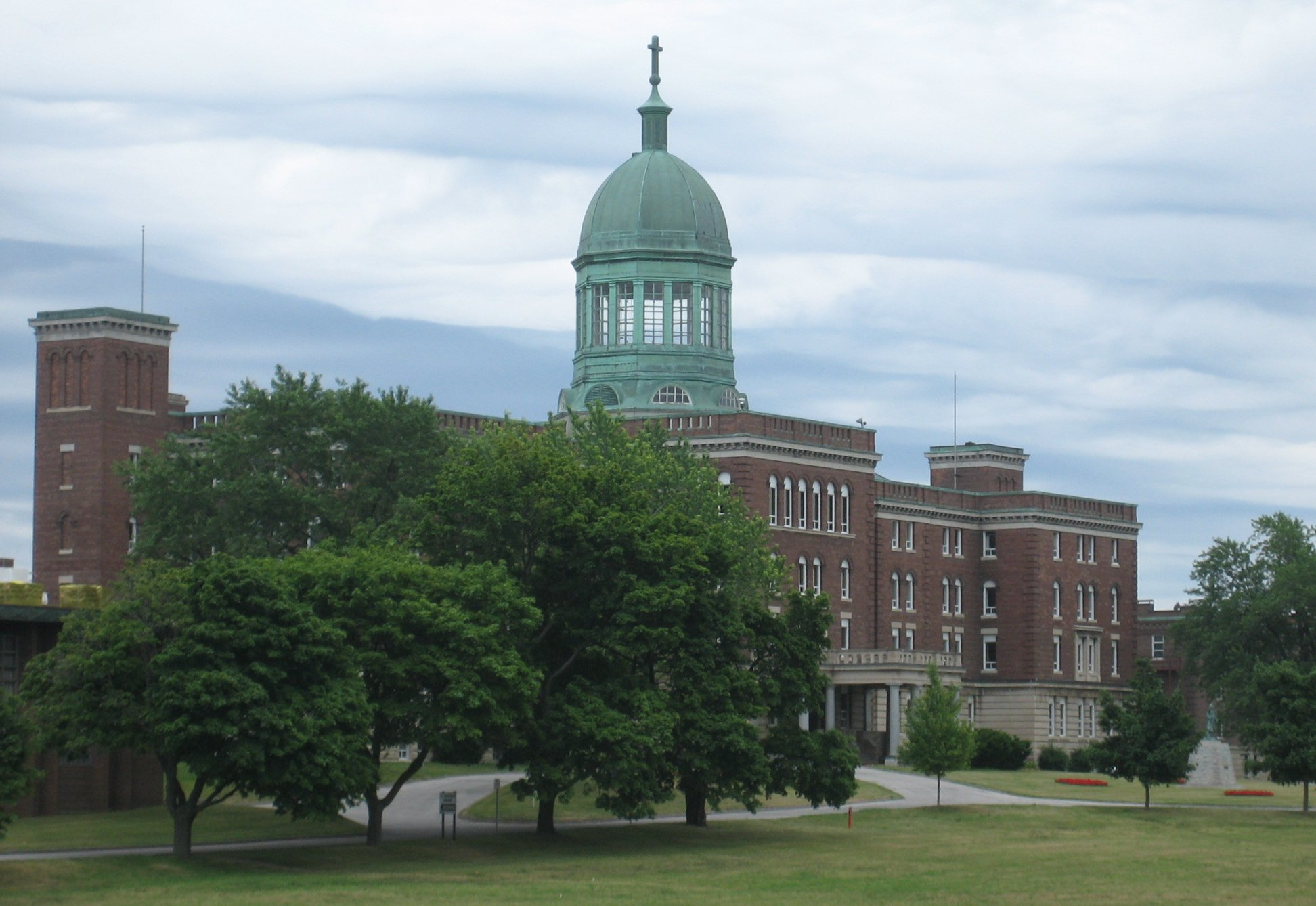
St. Augustine's Seminary

Under McNeil, thirty more parishes were established, including those with non-English speaking immigrants in Toronto. He lobbied for fair taxation for Catholic schools.

McNeil founded the Federation of Catholic Charities when, in 1927, Toronto's umbrella Federation for Community Service refused to continue to fund Roman Catholic charitable institutions.

McNeil died in 1934, while serving as Archbishop of Toronto. He is buried at St. Augustine's Seminary.

== Legacy ==
Under his leadership, the China Mission Seminary, later renamed the Scarboro Foreign Missionary Society, and the Toronto Newman Club were established.

Neil McNeil Catholic High School in Toronto was named in his honour.

== Sources ==
- Boyle, George (1951). Pioneer in Purple: The Life and Work of Archbishop Neil McNeil. Montreal: Palm Publishers.

Religious titles
Preceded by Michael Francis Howley	Bishop of St. George's, Newfoundland; 1904–1910	Succeeded by Michael Fintan Power
Preceded by Augustine Dontenwill	Archbishop of Vancouver; 1910–1912	Succeeded by Timothy Casey
Preceded by Fergus Patrick McEvay	Archbishop of Toronto; 1912–1934	Succeeded by James Charles McGuigan
