= Sexual abuse scandal in the Roman Catholic Diocese of Antigonish =

Clerical sexual abuse cases in Canada

There have been various cases of sexual abuse in the Diocese of Antigonish on the part of Roman Catholic clergy.

== 1950s cases ==
On 7 August 2009, Bishop Raymond Lahey announced that the Diocese of Antigonish had reached a $15 million settlement in a class action lawsuit filed by 125 victims of sexual abuse by Hugh Vincent MacDonald and other diocese priests dating from 1950 to 2009. The investigation began after David Martin committed suicide in April 2002, accusing in his suicide note MacDonald of sexually abusing him in the 1970s. Hugh MacDonald was charged with more than two dozen charges of sexual assaults against children and other members of his former parishes before he died in 2004. The settlement against the diocese was approved by the Supreme Court of Nova Scotia on 10 September 2009. In 2012 the diocese satisfied its legal obligations to pay out $15 million to the victims of sexual abuse, having to sell a large number of its properties, liquidating the bank accounts of many of its churches, and borrowing $6.5 million from private lenders to make the payout.

== Allegations against Bishop Raymond Lahey ==
In September 2009, Bishop Raymond Lahey's laptop was seized upon his return to Canada, after having visited parts of Europe. Canada Border Services Agency officers had performed a random search of his computer, uncovering images that raised concerns. Following an investigation Lahey was charged with the importation and possession of child pornography, and he subsequently tendered his resignation as Bishop for the Diocese. Lahey is alleged to have responded to the allegations by stating that he had never abused a child, and that he would "never have any sexual interest in a person under 18".

Subsequent to his arrest, allegations emerged that Lahey had previously been brought to the attention of former St. John's archbishop Alphonsus Liguori Penney in regard to child pornography allegations in the 1980s.

On 21 November 2009 Pope Benedict XVI named Brian Joseph Dunn as the Bishop of the Diocese of Antigonish. Archbishop of Halifax Anthony Mancini had served as Apostolic Administrator from September 2009 until Bishop Dunn's installation on 25 January 2010.

Lahey pleaded guilty to the charges on 4 May 2011. He requested imprisonment, surrendering his right to bail. On 4 January 2012, he was sentenced to 15 months of prison time and 24 months of probation. However, because he had spent 8 months in pre-trial custody, he was given time served and was discharged on the same day. This occurred as a result of a law that was repealed by the federal government in 2010; it had allowed judges to give 2-for-1 credit for time served. This was only possible in Lahey's case because he was charged in 2009, before the law was repealed.

On 16 May 2012, it was announced that Raymond Lahey had been defrocked by a decree by Pope Benedict XVI.

== In Canadian literature ==
- Canadian writer Linden MacIntyre, fictionalized the ongoing events of the scandal in his award-winning novel The Bishop's Man, which was published in 2009. The novel's guilt-ridden protagonist is a Roman Catholic priest and former fixer for the Diocese of Antigonish named Fr. Duncan MacAskill. After years of quietly burying potential scandals involving the Diocese's priests, Fr. MacAskill has been assigned by his Bishop to a remote parish on Cape Breton Island, Nova Scotia and ordered to maintain a low profile.

== See also ==
- Religious abuse
