= Diocese of Antigonish =

Latin Catholic diocese in Canada

Coordinates: 45.6201°N 61.9935°W

Diocese of Antigonish Dioecesis Antigonicensis
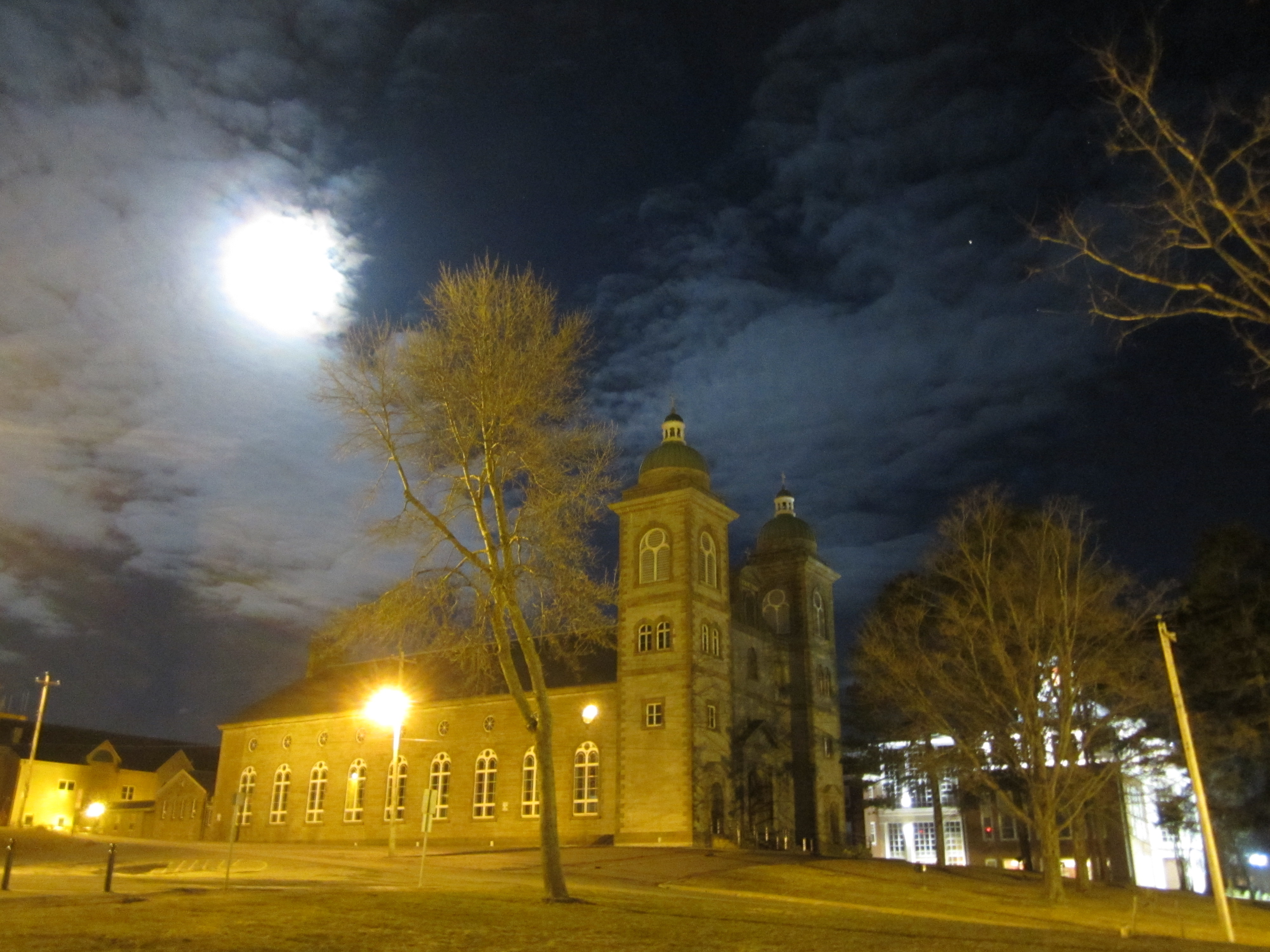

- Coat of arms

Location
- Country: Canada
- Ecclesiastical province: Halifax–Yarmouth

Statistics
- Area: 18,800 km^{2} (7,300 sq mi)
- Population: Total; Catholics: (as of 2020); ▲220,300; ▲124,400 (▲56.5%)

Information
- Denomination: Catholic Church
- Sui iuris church: Latin Church
- Rite: Roman Rite
- Established: August 23, 1886
- Cathedral: St. Ninian's Cathedral
- Secular priests: 74

Current leadership
- Pope: Leo XIV
- Bishop: Wayne Joseph Kirkpatrick
- Metropolitan Archbishop: Brian Joseph Dunn

Map

Website
- www.antigonishdiocese.com

The Diocese of Antigonish (Latin: Dioecesis Antigonicensis) is a Latin Church ecclesiastical jurisdiction or diocese of the Catholic Church in Nova Scotia, Canada. Its current diocesan ordinary is Wayne Joseph Kirkpatrick.

== History ==
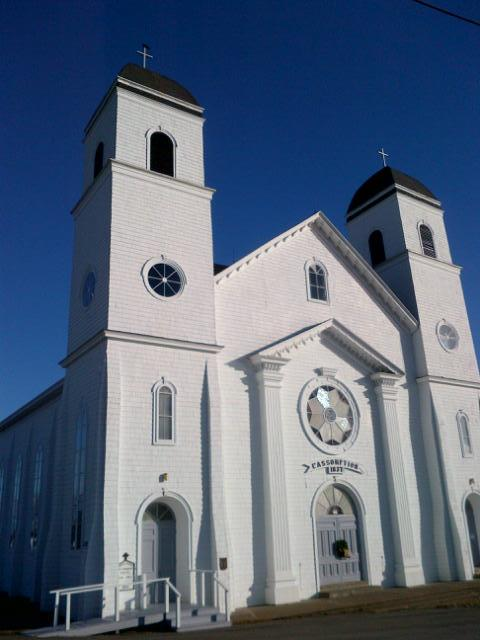
Proto-Cathedral of Notre Dame de L'Assomption, Arichat, Nova Scotia.

The Diocese was established on 22 September 1844, under the name of the Diocese of Arichat, on territory split off from the Diocese of Halifax. Its proto-cathedral (now Église Notre Dame de l’Assomption) was located on Cape Breton Island, in the port town of Arichat.

In both Scottish and Canadian folklore, the first ordinary of the Diocese, Bishop William Fraser of Strathglass, is a folk hero. He is said to have been a man of enormous physical strength and to have been able to break steel horseshoes with his bare hands. On both sides of the Atlantic Ocean, many legends have been collected of the Bishop's exploits.

On 23 August 1886, the diocese was renamed the Diocese of Antigonish, and its episcopal see moved to St. Ninian's Cathedral, on the Nova Scotia mainland in the town of Antigonish.

Prior to the outbreak of the First World War, the highly influential Antigonish Movement, which combined adult education, co-operatives, microfinance and rural community development to help small, resource-based villages throughout the Maritimes to improve their economic and social circumstances, was largely founded and led by a small group of Diocesan priests: Father James Tompkins, Father Moses Coady, and Fr. Hugh MacPherson.

In 1946, Scottish nationalist, folklorist, and scholar of Scottish Gaelic literature John Lorne Campbell was received into the Roman Catholic Church inside St. Ninian's Cathedral in Antigonish. Campbell, along with his American-born musicologist wife, Margaret Fay Shaw, had previously collected much folklore and traditional music from Diocesan Catholics in both Canadian Gaelic and the indigenous Mi'kmaq language, which was recorded onto Ediphone wax cylinders.

=== 2009–2010 apostolic administration ===
On August 7, 2009, Bishop Raymond Lahey announced that the Diocese of Antigonish had reached a $15 million settlement in a class action lawsuit filed by 125 victims of sexual abuse by Hugh Vincent MacDonald and other diocese priests dating from 1950 to 2009. On September 26, 2009 Pope Benedict XVI accepted the resignation of Bishop Raymond Lahey, one day after a warrant was issued for his arrest by the Ottawa Police Service relating to child pornography charges (cf. sexual abuse scandal in Antigonish diocese). The bishop pleaded guilty to child pornography charges and was jailed.

Archbishop Anthony Mancini of the Archdiocese of Halifax was named the Apostolic Administrator effective September 26, 2009, and remained in that position until the installation of Brian Dunn on January 25, 2010.

== Extent ==
The Diocese of Antigonish covers 18,800 square kilometers, comprising the counties of Pictou, Antigonish, Guysborough, Inverness, Victoria, Richmond and Cape Breton.

As of 2006, the diocese contained 123 parishes, 119 active diocesan priests, 8 religious priests, and 129,905 Catholics. It also has 290 women religious, 12 religious brothers and 1 permanent deacon. In 2012 in order to satisfy its legal obligations to pay out $15 million to the victims of sexual abuse, the diocese had to sell a large number of its lands and properties, liquidating the bank accounts of many of its churches, and borrowing $6.5 million from private lenders to make the payout.

Until 2015, the Bishop of Antigonish served ex officio as Chancellor of St. Francis Xavier University.

== Bishops ==
Bishops of Arichat

- William Fraser [Frazer] (1844-1851), previously titular Bishop of Tanis (1825.06.03 – 1842.02.15), Apostolic Vicar of Nova Scotia (Canada) (1825.06.03 – 1842.02.15), Bishop of Diocese of Halifax (Canada) (1842.02.15 – 1844.09.27)
- Colin Francis MacKinnon (1851-1877), later Titular Archbishop of Amida (1877.08.30 – 1879.09.26)
- John Cameron (1877.07.17 – 1886.08.23 see below), previously Titular Bishop of Titopolis (1870.03.11 – 1877.07.17) and Coadjutor Bishop of Arichat (Canada) (1870.03.11 – 1877.07.17)

Bishops of Antigonish

- John Cameron (see above) (1886.08.23 – 1910.04.06)
- James Morrison (1912–1950), created Archbishop ad personam (1944.02.26 – 1950.04.13)
- John Roderick MacDonald (1950–1959), previously Bishop of Peterborough (Canada) (1943.06.05 – 1945.04.14), Titular Bishop of Ancusa (1945.04.14 – 1950.04.13), Coadjutor Bishop of Antigonish (Canada) (1945.04.14 – 1950.04.13)
- William Edward Power (1960–1986), also President of the Canadian Conference of Catholic Bishops (1971 – 1973)
- Colin Campbell (1986–2002)
- Raymond Lahey (2003–2009), previously Bishop of Saint George's (Canada) (1986.07.05 – 2003.04.05); later Lay state (May 2012)
- Apostolic Administrator Anthony Mancini - (2009 - 2010), while Metropolitan Archbishop of Halifax(-Yarmouth) (Canada) (2007.10.18 – 2009.10.22)
- Brian Dunn (2010–2019), previously Titular Bishop of Munatiana and Auxiliary Bishop of Sault Sainte Marie (Canada) (2008.07.16 – 2009.11.21); appointed, 13 Apr 2019, Coadjutor Archbishop of Halifax-Yarmouth, Nova Scotia
- Wayne Joseph Kirkpatrick (2019 – present), previously Titular Bishop of Aradi and Auxiliary Bishop of Toronto (2012.05.18 - 2019.12.18)

Other priests of this diocese who became bishops

- Thomas Sears, appointed Prefect of Western Newfoundland (St. George’s) in 1871
- Neil McNeil, appointed Vicar Apostolic of Western Newfoundland (St. George’s) in 1895
- Ronald MacDonald, appointed Bishop of Harbour Grace, Newfoundland in 1881
- Alexander MacDonald, appointed Bishop of Victoria, British Columbia in 1908
- John Hugh MacDonald, appointed Bishop of Victoria, British Columbia in 1934
- Malcolm Angus MacEachern, appointed Bishop of Charlottetown, Prince Edward Island in 1954
- Joseph Neil MacNeil, appointed Bishop of Saint John, New Brunswick in 1969

== In Canadian literature ==
- Following Bishop William Fraser's death in 1851, local Catholic poet Ailean a' Ridse MacDhòmhnaill, a major figure in both Scottish Gaelic literature and in that of Canadian Gaelic, composed the poem Cumha do' n Easguig Friseal ("Lament for Bishop Fraser"), which MacDhòmhnaill set to the air A' bliadhna leum dar milleadh. According to Effie Rankin, Ailean a' Ridse adapted the traditional verse iconography of a Highland clan mourning for the death of their Chief to the Catholic Gaels of the Diocese mourning for the death of their Bishop.
- Canadian writer Linden MacIntyre, fictionalized the events of the ongoing sexual abuse scandal in Antigonish diocese in his award-winning novel The Bishop's Man, which was published in 2009. The novel's guilt-ridden protagonist is a Roman Catholic priest and former fixer for the Diocese of Antigonish named Fr. Duncan MacAskill. After years of quietly burying potential scandals involving the Diocese's priests, Fr. MacAskill has been assigned by his Bishop to a remote parish on Cape Breton Island, Nova Scotia and ordered to maintain a low profile.

== Sources and external links ==
- Official website
- GigaCatholic, with incumbent biography links
- St. Francis Xavier University
- Virtual Tour of the Architectural Heritage of Antigonish, Nova Scotia
