= Colin Francis MacKinnon =

Canadian Roman Catholic Archbishop (1810–1879)

- Bishop of Arichat, Nova Scotia
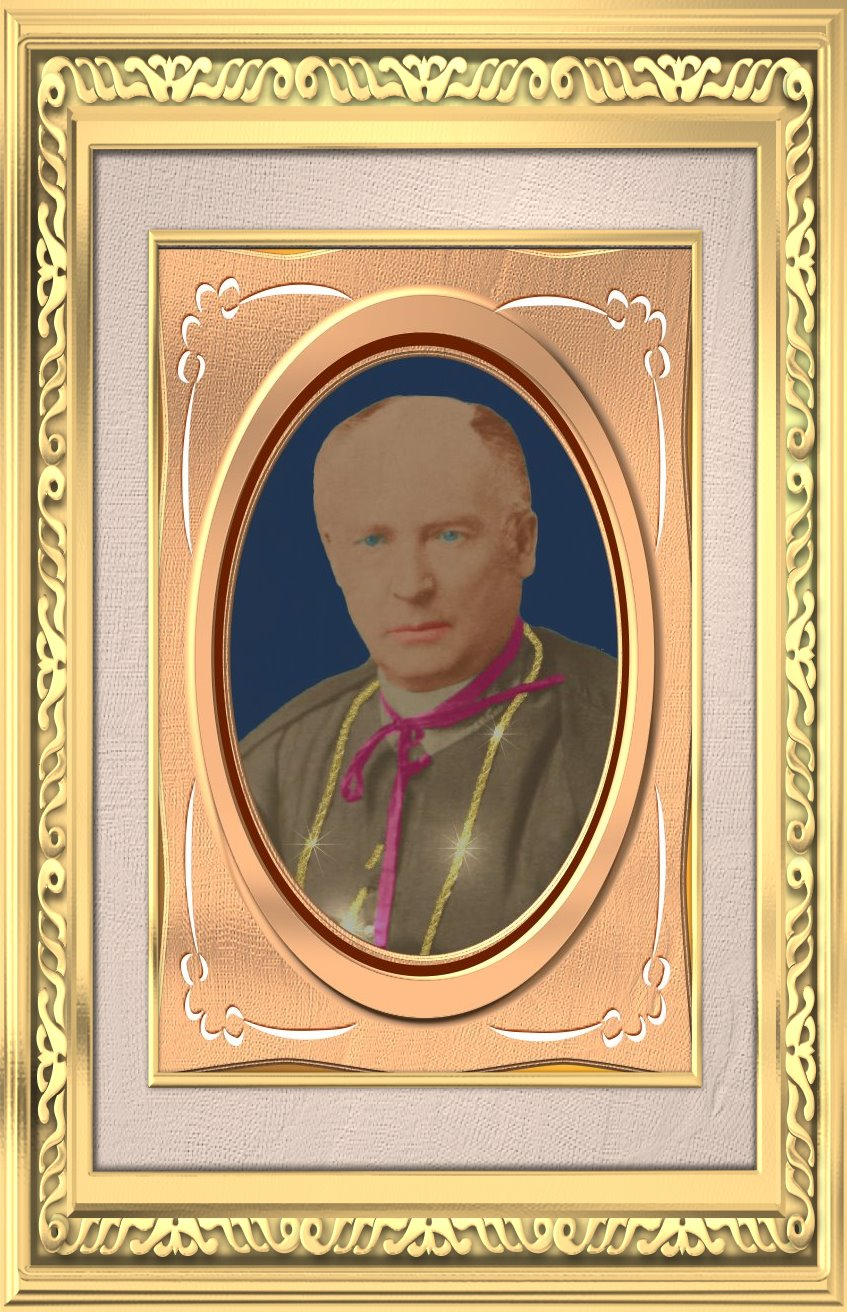
- Diocese: Antigonish
- Installed: September 21, 1851
- Term ended: August 30, 1877
- Predecessor: William Fraser
- Successor: John Cameron
- Other post: Titular Archbishop of Amida

Personal details
- Born: July 20, 1810 Near Antigonish, Nova Scotia
- Died: September 26, 1879 (aged 69) Antigonish, Nova Scotia

Colin Francis MacKinnon (July 20, 1810 – September 26, 1879) was a Canadian Roman Catholic Archbishop and founder of St. Francis Xavier University and Saint Ninian's Cathedral.

== Biography ==
Born in William's Point, in the County of Antigonish, Nova Scotia, the son of John MacKinnon and Eunice MacLeod, MacKinnon's father came to the United States from Eigg, Scotland in 1791 and soon settled in Nova Scotia.

In 1828, MacKinnon travelled by sea through a terrible storm to Rome to make his theological studies at the Pontifical Urbaniana University or Pontifical Urban University (Latin: Pontificia Universitas Urbaniana) is a pontifical university under the authority of the Congregation for the Evangelization of Peoples. It is also known as The Collegio Urbano of Propaganda Fide.The university is located on the Janiculum Hill in Rome and has four faculties: the faculty of Theology, the faculty of Philosophy, the faculty of Canon Law, and the faculty of Missiology.

The origins of the university date back to Pope Urban VIII who decided to establish the Urban College with his papal bull Immortalis Dei Filius (August 1, 1627). The Pontifical Urbaniana University was endowed with the title "Pontifical" with the motu proprio Fidei Propagandae of Pope John XXIII, on October 1, 1962. From its beginnings, the Urbaniana has always been an academic institution with a missionary character that has served the Catholic Church through the formation of missionaries and experts in the area of Missiology or other disciplines, necessary in the evangelical activity of the Church.

MacKinnon was ordained priest by Archbishop Giacomo Filippo Fransoni on June 4, 1837. Returning to Nova Scotia, he was appointed the first resident pastor at St Andrews, Sydney County, Nova Scotia.

On November 9, 1851, he was appointed Bishop of Arichat by Pope Pius IX. On February 27, 1852 he was consecrated bishop by Bishop William Walsh, at St. Mary's Cathedral, Halifax and this was the first consecration of a Catholic bishop in Halifax. In 1853, he founded a seminary, St. Francis Xavier College, which grew into St. Francis Xavier University.

He resigned in 1877 and was then made an archbishop. He died in 1879, aged 69.
