= William Walsh (archbishop of Halifax) =

- Archbishop of Halifax, Nova Scotia
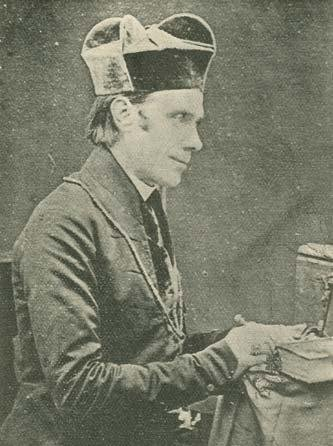
- Church: Roman Catholic
- Archdiocese: Halifax
- Installed: 1844
- Term ended: 1858
- Predecessor: William Fraser
- Successor: Thomas-Louis Connolly

Orders
- Ordination: 1828

Personal details
- Born: 7 November 1804 Waterford, United Kingdom of Great Britain and Ireland
- Died: 11 August 1858 (aged 53) Halifax, Nova Scotia
- Education: St. John's College, Waterford; Maynooth College

William Walsh (7 November 1804 – 11 August 1858) was an archbishop of the Roman Catholic Archdiocese of Halifax. He was born in Waterford, County Waterford, Ireland and died in Halifax, Nova Scotia.

== Biography ==
Walsh studied at St. John's College, Waterford and Maynooth College and was ordained in Waterford. Following ordination he ministered in Dublin.

Walsh became bishop of Halifax in 1845 and in 1852, was appointed archbishop of an expanded ecclesiastical province of Nova Scotia, also designated as Halifax. He became the first archbishop in British North America outside Quebec.

On 15 September 1856, Walsh confirmed as Mi'kmaq Grand Chief Jacques-Pierre Peminuit Paul at St. Mary's Basilica (Halifax), Paul also receiving a medal from Pope Pius IX and a written endorsement from the Lt. Governor, Sir John Gaspard Le Marchant.
