= William Fraser (bishop of Arichat) =

Roman Catholic priest of Nova Scotia

William Fraser (1778 or 1779 Glen Cannich, Inverness-shire, Scotland – October 4, 1851 Antigonish, Nova Scotia, Canada) was a Canadian Roman Catholic priest and the first Bishop of Halifax in Nova Scotia from 1842 until the splitting of the diocese into two dioceses effective September 22, 1844, when William Walsh took formal possession of the Diocese of Halifax.

== Early life ==
William Fraser was born in Glen Cannich, part of the wider Strathglass region of the Northwest Highlands of Scotland, as the eldest of the 12 children of Scottish Gaelic-speaking parents John Fraser and Jane Chisholm. His family belonged to the Catholic Church in Scotland.

After attending an underground Catholic school in his native district, he continued his education at the clandestine minor seminary at Samalaman in Moidart. In January 1794 he began his studies for the priesthood at the Royal Scots College in Valladolid, Spain. After being ordained to the priesthood on 8 Jan. 1804, he returned to Scotland soon after. After returning to Scotland, at a hammer throw event in his native region, John Fraser, who did not recognize his own son, is said to have shouted, (Scottish Gaelic: "Mac na galla, nam biodh Uilleam mo mhac-sa an seo, cha biodh a dhòigh fhèin aige!", "Son of a bitch, if my son William were here, he would not have his way!")

== Priestly ministry ==
Following his return to Scotland, Fraser's cousin, Bishop John Chisholm appointed him as an underground missionary in Lochaber. In this wide apostolate, Fraser's duties included overseeing the semi-underground Lismore Seminary and helping to organize what is now St. Mary's Roman Catholic Church in Fort William.

In 1822, he emigrated to Nova Scotia. Upon his arrival in Canada, Bishop Angus Bernard MacEachern introduced him to the Canadian Gaelic-speaking pioneer communities of Cape Breton Island and Antigonish County. Fraser was appointed to Mabou and in less than a month received added responsibility for the missions surrounding Bras d'Or Lake. In January 1824 he was given charge of St Ninian’s Roman Catholic Church in Antigonish, where he remained for the rest of his life.

He is said to have been a man of enormous physical strength and to have been able to break steel horseshoes with his bare hands, with legends have been collected of the Bishop's exploits.

Catholic Church titles
Preceded by Denis Lyons	Apostolic Vicar of Nova Scotia; 1825–1842	Succeeded by Himself as Bishop of Halifax
Preceded by Denis Lyons	— TITULAR — Bishop of Tanis; 1825–1842	Succeeded by José Antonio García; Balsalobre y Rada
Preceded by Himself as Apostolic Vicar of Nova Scotia	Bishop of Halifax; 1842–1844	Succeeded by William Walsh
New diocese	Bishop of Arichat; 1844–1851	Succeeded by Colin Francis MacKinnon
