= Causeway (disambiguation) =

A causeway is a road or railway elevated by a bank, usually across a broad body of water or wetland.

Causeway may also refer to:

== Locations ==
- Andersons Bay Causeway, road and bridge span across Andersons Bay Inlet, Dunedin, New Zealand
- Battleship Parkway, commonly referred to "The Causeway", Mobile, Alabama
- Causeway, County Kerry, a village in the Republic of Ireland
- Causeway Bay, a heavily built-up area of Hong Kong
- Causeway Islands, four small islands near the Pacific entrance to the Panama Canal
- Causeway Road, a main road in Hong Kong
- Giant's Causeway, a rock formation in Northern Ireland
- Lake Pontchartrain Causeway, the world's second longest over-water bridge, Louisiana, United States
- Causeway Lane, the home ground of Matlock Town F.C., an English football club
- The Causeway, two bridges that span the Swan River in Perth, Western Australia
- The Causeway, Bermuda
- Johor–Singapore Causeway, which links Malaysia to Singapore

== Other uses ==
- Causeway: A Passage from Innocence, a 2006 book by Linden MacIntyre
- Causeway (film), an American drama film
- Causeway Bay station, a station on MTR's Island line on Hong Kong Island
- Causeway Classic, the annual College football game between the University of California, Davis and the California State University, Sacramento
- Causeway Films, Australian film production company, maker of The Babadook
- Causeway Institute, an educational institution in Northern Ireland
- Causeway Point, one of the largest shopping malls in Singapore
