= Anthony Mancini (bishop) =

Canadian prelate

The Most Reverend Anthony Mancini
- Archbishop Emeritus of Halifax–Yarmouth
- Church: Catholic Church
- Archdiocese: Archdiocese of Halifax–Yarmouth
- In office: 18 October 2007 – 27 November 2020
- Predecessor: Terrence Prendergast
- Successor: Brian Joseph Dunn
- Previous posts: Apostolic Administrator of Antigonish (2009); Apostolic Administrator of Yarmouth (2007-2009); Titular Bishop of Natchitoches (1999-2007); Auxiliary Bishop of Montreal (1999-2007)

Orders
- Ordination: 23 May 1970
- Consecration: 25 March 1999 by Jean-Claude Turcotte

Personal details
- Born: 27 November 1945 (age 80) Mignano Monte Lungo, Province of Caserta, Kingdom of Italy

Anthony Mancini KGOHS (born 27 November 1945) is a Canadian prelate of the Roman Catholic Church who served as the Archbishop of Halifax-Yarmouth. He retired on 27 November 2020.

== Biography ==
=== Early life ===
Born in Mignano Monte Lungo, near Naples, Mancini emigrated to Canada with his family, arriving at Pier 21 on 1 December 1948, and was raised in Montreal.

=== Education ===
Archbishop Mancini received a Bachelor of Arts from Resurrection College at the University of Waterloo, a Licentiate in Theology from Université de Montréal, a Master of Arts in religious studies from McGill University, studies in ecumenical theology at the University of Geneva and his Doctor of Philosophy in pastoral theology at Université de Montréal.

=== Career ===
Archbishop Mancini was ordained a priest in the Archdiocese of Montreal on 23 May 1970. On 18 February 1999, he was appointed an Auxiliary Bishop of Montreal by Cardinal Jean-Claude Turcotte.

On 18 October 2007, he was appointed to the Archdiocese of Halifax, succeeding Archbishop Terrence Thomas Prendergast as the ordinary. At the same time, Mancini was appointed Apostolic Administrator of the Diocese of Yarmouth after Bishop James Matthew Wingle was transferred to the Diocese of Saint Catharines. He was installed to these positions on 29 November 2007.

On 26 September 2009, Archbishop Mancini also became the Apostolic Administrator of the Diocese of Antigonish following the resignation of Bishop Raymond Lahey. This lasted until 21 November 2009, when the Holy See appointed Bishop Brian Dunn as ordinary of that diocese.

On 8 December 2011, Pope Benedict XVI merged the Diocese of Yarmouth with the Archdiocese of Halifax to form the Archdiocese of Halifax-Yarmouth. As a result, Mancini became the first Archbishop of the newly formed Archdiocese.

On 25 November 2020, a report was released detailing how a Catholic church-commissioned investigation led by former Quebec Superior Court justice Pepita Capriolo found that Mancini was among the former Archdiocese of Montreal officials who took no action against Father Brian Boucher after receiving reports Boucher sexually abused boys. Boucher pled guilty in January 2019 to sex abuse charges and received an eight-year prison sentence.

Archbishop Mancini retired on his 75th birthday, 27 November 2020. Mancini was Grand Prior of the Canada-Atlantic Lieutenancy of the Equestrian Order of the Holy Sepulchre of Jerusalem until his retirement.

Catholic Church titles
Preceded by Terrence Prendergast	Archbishop of Halifax; 2007-2020	Succeeded by Brian Joseph Dunn
