= Terrence Prendergast =

Canadian prelate (born 1944)

His Grace, The Most Reverend Terrence Prendergast SJ
- Archbishop Emeritus of Ottawa-Cornwall
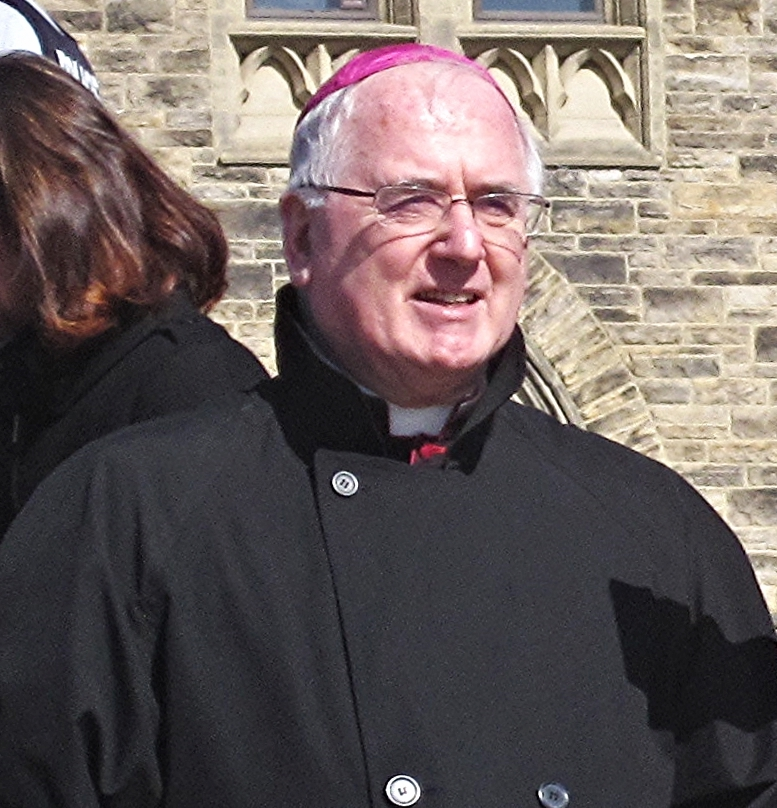
- Prendergast in 2015
- Church: Latin Church
- Archdiocese: Ottawa
- Installed: 26 June 2007
- Term ended: 4 December 2020
- Predecessor: Marcel André J. Gervais
- Successor: Marcel Damphousse
- Other posts: Member of Vox Clara; Archbishop of Halifax (1998-2007); Apostolic Administrator of the Yarmouth (2002-2007); Titular Bishop of Slebte and Auxiliary Bishop of Toronto (1995-1998)

Orders
- Ordination: 10 June 1972 by Thomas Benjamin Fulton
- Consecration: 25 April 1995 by Aloysius Ambrozic

Personal details
- Born: 19 February 1944 (age 82) Montreal, Quebec, Canada
- Denomination: Roman Catholic
- Education: Fordham University; Saint Mary's University; Toronto School of Theology; Regis College, Toronto
- Motto: In Nomine Jesu; (In the Name of Jesus)
- Coat of arms

Styles of Terrence Prendergast
- Reference style: The Most Reverend (English); Monseigneur (French)
- Spoken style: Your Grace/ My Lord Archbishop (English); Monseigneur (French)
- Religious style: Archbishop

Terrence Thomas Prendergast SJ (born 19 February 1944) is a Canadian member of the Society of Jesus who is also a prelate of the Roman Catholic Church and the Archbishop Emeritus of Ottawa-Cornwall. He was formerly an auxiliary bishop of the Archdiocese of Toronto and the Archbishop of Halifax. On 6 May 2020, Pope Francis merged the Archdiocese of Ottawa and the Diocese of Alexandria-Cornwall, naming Prendergast as archbishop of the newly formed Archdiocese of Ottawa-Cornwall. He formally retired on 4 December 2020 and was succeeded by Marcel Damphousse, the coadjutor archbishop.

== Early life ==
A native of Montreal, Prendergast was born in 1944, one of five children. He entered the Jesuit novitiate in 1961 and was ordained a priest in 1972. He holds a Bachelor of Arts degree from Fordham University, as well as Master of Divinity and Doctor of Theology degrees from Saint Mary's University, Halifax, through its earlier affiliation with Regis College, now part of the Toronto School of Theology.

For his regency, Prendergast taught Latin and Greek at Loyola High School in Montreal from 1967-1969 and, after ordination and graduate studies in theology, taught in Halifax at the Atlantic School of Theology from 1975–1981, then was rector of Toronto's Regis College from 1981–87, and its dean of theology from 1991-1994. From 1992-94 he assisted Frederick Henry, then the Auxiliary Bishop of London (Ontario), later Bishop of Thunder Bay and Bishop of Calgary, in conducting an apostolic visitation of the English-language seminaries in Canada for the Vatican. In 1995, he was a visiting professor at the Ecole Biblique in Jerusalem.

== Episcopal roles ==
Pope John Paul II named Prendergast the titular bishop of Slebte and an auxiliary bishop of the Archdiocese of Toronto on 22 February 1995. He was consecrated at St. Michael's Cathedral on 25 April 1995. In Toronto, his duties as auxiliary included responsibility for the Western Pastoral Region (Etobicoke, part of North York and the region of Peel-Dufferin), liaison with the theological faculties and planning for the Great Jubilee.

In 1998, Prendergast was appointed the Archbishop of Halifax and installed on 14 September 1998. He served ex officio as the chancellor of Saint Mary's University, Halifax, a position granted to the Archbishop of Halifax until 2007, when the archdiocese and the university agreed to bestow the title of visitor instead. Prendergast was apostolic administrator of the Diocese of Yarmouth (now part of the Archdiocese of Halifax-Yarmouth), from January 2002 to May 2007, and took part in the Apostolic visitation to Ireland which began in 2010 and was completed in 2011.

Prendergast was named the ninth Archbishop of Ottawa by Pope Benedict XVI on 14 May 2007 and was installed on 26 June 2007. In this office, he also serves ex officio as Chancellor of Saint Paul University. In 2012, Prendergast welcomed a number of members of the Anglican Catholic Church of Canada into full communion with the Roman Catholic Church.

He was appointed Apostolic Administrator of Alexandria-Cornwall on 13 January 2016, and became bishop there on 27 April 2018, while remaining Archbishop of Ottawa. The two dioceses were united in persona episcopi ("in the person of the bishop"). They were then united on 6 May 2020, to form the Archdiocese of Ottawa-Cornwall, under him as archbishop.

On 30 November 2020, he was appointed apostolic administrator of Diocese of Hearst–Moosonee after the resignation of its bishop, Robert Ovide Bourgon. On the following 4 December, he formally retired as archbishop and was succeeded by Marcel Damphousse, the coadjutor archbishop who was appointed when the new Archdiocese of Ottawa-Cornwall was formed.

Prendergast is a known supporter of the Tridentine Mass and has collaborated on numerous occasions with the Priestly Fraternity of Saint Peter (FSSP). He has ordained many members of the society in Canada and the United States since 2015, including the ordination of Luc Poirier in the Notre-Dame Cathedral Basilica on 31 May 2019.

After serving on the Canadian Bishops' Commission for Relations with Associations of Clergy, Consecrated Life and Laity, as a member of the CCCB Theology Commission [now known as the Doctrine Commission], its Commission on Social Communications, several terms on the Permanent Council (including since 2015 as representative of the bishops of Ontario) and earlier as co-chair of the national Anglican-Roman Catholic dialogue, Prendergast is, since October 2014, a member of the CCCB's Episcopal Liaison Committee to the Canadian Catholic Organization for Development and Peace. His other responsibilities include president of National Evangelization Teams Canada (NET Canada) and chair of CNEWA (Catholic Near East Welfare Association) Canada, both of which are based in Ottawa.

Prendergast is a teacher, writer and retreat master. From 1994 to 2005, he wrote a weekly column in the Catholic Register. A collection of his essays was published as Living God's Word: Reflections on the Sunday Readings for Year A, B, C. He has been a writer or editor for several journals, and lectured and given retreats across Canada, in the United States and Rome.

Catholic Church titles
Preceded by Paul Schruers	Titular Bishop of Slebte; 1995–1998	Succeeded by Józef Wesołowski
Preceded by Austin-Emile Burke	Archbishop of Halifax; 1998–2007	Succeeded by Anthony Mancini
Preceded by Marcel André J. Gervais	Archbishop of Ottawa-Cornwall; 2007–2020	Succeeded by Marcel Damphousse
