= Loss of clerical state =

Removal from clerical membership

In the canon law of the Catholic Church, the loss of clerical state (commonly referred to as laicization, dismissal, defrocking, deposition, and degradation) is the removal of a bishop, priest, or deacon from holy orders and the status of being a member of the clergy.

The term defrocking originated in the ritual removal of vestments as a penalty against clergy that was eventually codified within the Roman Pontifical. Contemporary Latin Catholic canon law does not contain such a ritual, leading some to consider it an inaccurate description of laicization. However, others consider "defrocking" a synonym to laicization that is especially popular in English. While the ritual removal of the vestments no longer exists, canon law still prohibits the wearing of a clerical collar by laicized priests.

In the Catholic Church, a bishop, priest, or deacon may be dismissed from the clerical state as a penalty for certain grave offences, or by a papal decree granted for grave reasons. This may be because of a serious criminal conviction, heresy, or similar matter. Removal from the clerical state is sometimes imposed as a punishment (Latin: ad poenam), or it may be granted as a favour (Latin: pro gratia) at the cleric's own request. A Catholic cleric may voluntarily request to be removed from the clerical state for a grave, personal reason. Voluntary requests were, as of the 1990s, believed to be by far the most common means of this loss, and most common within this category was the intention to marry, as most Latin Church clergy must as a rule be celibate. Canon law was amended in March 2019 to allow dismissal from their community, though not dismissal from the clerical state, for religious who are members of, and desert, a religious community. This policy has been in force since 10 April 2019.

== Consequences ==
Laicization involves cessation of all the rights of the clerical state. It also terminates all obligations of the clerical state, except for the obligation of celibacy. Dispensation from the obligation of celibacy can only be granted by the pope, except in ordinations that have been declared invalid, in which case no dispensation is necessary. Because the sacramental character of ordination makes it indelible, the cleric maintains the power of orders. He is, however, forbidden to exercise it, except to give sacramental absolution to someone in danger of death. He also automatically loses his offices, roles and delegated powers.

Normally, the same rescript grants both laicization and dispensation from the obligation of celibacy. The person to whom it is granted is not permitted to separate the two, accepting the dispensation while rejecting the laicization, or accepting the laicization while rejecting the dispensation. While married deacons whose wives die are sometimes permitted to marry again, and married ministers of a non-Catholic confession who become Catholics are sometimes permitted to be ordained and minister in the Catholic Church, grants of dispensation from the obligation of celibacy without simultaneous laicization are very rare.

A laicized cleric loses rights to such things as clerical garb and titles (such as "Father"). He is freed from obligations such as recitation of the Liturgy of the Hours, but like any member of the laity, is encouraged, though not obliged, to continue to recite it. The rescript of laicization for a deacon normally contains no special limitations, but that for a priest does prohibit him from delivering a homily (the sermon preached at Mass after proclamation of the Gospel reading, not preaching in general), acting as extraordinary minister of Holy Communion, having a directive office in the pastoral field, or having any function in a seminary or similar institution. It imposes restrictions also regarding the holding of teaching or administration posts in schools and universities. Some of these limitations may be relaxed according to the judgment of the local bishop including the teaching of theology in schools or universities (both Catholic and non-Catholic), maintaining contact with the parish where the priest used to serve, and administering the Eucharist.

A cleric dismissed from the clerical state cannot be reinstated in the sacred ministry without the consent of the pope.

New regulations issued in 2009 regarding priests who abandon their ministry for more than five years and whose behavior is a cause of serious scandal have made it easier for bishops to secure this removal of clerical status from such priests even against the priests' wishes. In 2011 and 2012, nearly 400 Catholic priests were removed from the clerical state, with a peak of 260 in 2011, and nearly half of these being imposed as a penalty.

== Difference from suspension ==
The removal from the clerical state differs from suspension. The latter is a censure prohibiting certain acts by a cleric, whether the acts are of a religious character deriving from his ordination ("acts of the power of orders") or are exercises of his power of governance or of rights and functions attached to the office he holds. As a censure, suspension is meant to cease when the censured person shows repentance. Removal from the clerical state, on the contrary, is a permanent measure, whereby for a sufficient reason a cleric is from then on juridically treated as a layman.

== Notable historical examples ==
At Napoléon Bonaparte's insistence, Charles Maurice de Talleyrand-Périgord requested laicization in 1802, in order to marry his long-time lover Catherine Grand (née Worlée). Talleyrand was already excommunicated for his part in the Civil Constitution of the Clergy. Pope Pius VII reluctantly lifted the excommunication and gave him permission to wear secular clothing, which permission the French Conseil d'État interpreted as a laicization. Talleyrand married Worlée, then divorced her in 1815, living on as a layman. On his deathbed in 1838, he signed a document of reconciliation with the church, prepared by future bishop Félix Dupanloup. Dupanloup then administered the last rites to Talleyrand.

In 1942, controversial priest Charles Coughlin, who was deemed to be pro-Nazi, was nearly defrocked until he agreed to give up non-pastoral activities.

Camilo Torres Restrepo requested laicization in order to focus on his radical politics, although he never abandoned his faith and he remained a devout Catholic.

In September 2018, Pope Francis ordered the laicization of a Chilean priest convicted in 2011 of the sexual abuse of minors. He had previously been sentenced to a life of prayer and penance.

=== Cases of bishops ===
The laicization of bishops is unusual.

Bishop of San Pedro Fernando Lugo requested laicization in Paraguay in 2005 to allow him to run for President of Paraguay. The Church at first refused, going so far as to suspend him as bishop when he ran for office anyway, but eventually granted him lay status in 2008 after he was elected.

In 2009, the church laicized Emmanuel Milingo, a former exorcist, faith healer, and Archbishop of Lusaka, Zambia, who had already been excommunicated three years prior. Milingo had threatened to form a breakaway church without a rule of priestly celibacy, and had himself married.

Raymond Lahey, the former Bishop of Antigonish, Nova Scotia, Canada, was laicized in 2012, a year after he pleaded guilty in Canadian criminal court to importing child pornography.

Józef Wesołowski, a Polish archbishop who had been a nuncio (papal ambassador), was dismissed from the clerical state in 2014 on grounds of sexual abuse of minors. The Vatican had made criminal charges against Wesołowski related to his abuse of minors and planned to try him, but he died in 2015 before a trial could be held.

Theodore McCarrick, a former cardinal and Archbishop of Washington, D.C., was dismissed from the clerical state in February 2019. McCarrick is the highest-ranked church official in history to be dismissed over the ongoing sexual abuse scandals in the church.

Roger Vangheluwe, who was the Bishop of Bruges until 2010, was laicized on March 11, 2024, after new elements regarding the prolonged abuse of his nephew came to light. Vangheluwe abused the boy since the latter was aged 5, for a period of at least 13 years. The statute of limitations in Belgium meant he could not be prosecuted anymore when the case was exposed in 2010.
