= Austin-Emile Burke =

Roman Catholic Archbishop (1922–2011)

- Archbishop of Halifax
- Church: Roman Catholic Church
- See: Archdiocese of Halifax
- In office: 1991–1998
- Predecessor: James Martin Hayes
- Successor: Terrence Thomas Prendergast
- Previous post: Prelate

Orders
- Ordination: March 25, 1950

Personal details
- Born: January 22, 1922 Sluice Point, Nova Scotia
- Died: August 12, 2011 (aged 89)
- Coat of arms

Austin-Emile Burke (January 22, 1922 – August 12, 2011) was a Canadian Prelate of the Catholic Church.

Austin-Emile Burke was born in Sluice Point, Nova Scotia, and ordained a priest on March 25, 1950. Burke was appointed bishop of the Diocese of Yarmouth on February 1, 1968, and consecrated on May 14, 1968. Burke was appointed archbishop of the Archdiocese of Halifax on July 8, 1991, and installed September 19, 1991. Burke retired on January 13, 1998.

== See also ==
- Archdiocese of Halifax
- Diocese of Yarmouth
