= Colin Campbell (Canadian bishop) =

Canadian Roman Catholic bishop

- Bishop of Antigonish
- Church: Catholic Church
- Diocese: Diocese of Antigonish
- In office: 12 December 1986 – 26 August 2002
- Predecessor: William Edward Power
- Successor: Raymond Lahey

Orders
- Ordination: 26 May 1956 by Joseph Gerald Berry
- Consecration: 19 March 1987 by James Martin Hayes

Personal details
- Born: July 12, 1931 Antigonish, Nova Scotia, Dominion of Canada
- Died: January 17, 2012 (aged 80) Halifax, Nova Scotia, Canada

Colin Campbell (July 12, 1931 – January 17, 2012) was a Roman Catholic bishop of the Roman Catholic Diocese of Antigonish, Nova Scotia, Canada.

On 26 May 1956 he was ordained a priest in Halifax and he was appointed bishop of the Diocese of Antigonish on 12 December 1986. He was ordained as a bishop the following year on 19 March 1987, and consecrated by bishops James Martin Hayes, Donat Chiasson, and William Edward Power.

== Later years and death ==
Bishop Campbell resigned on 26 October 2002, and died on January 17, 2012, aged 80, from undisclosed causes.

Catholic Church titles
Preceded by William Edward Power	Bishop of Antigonish; 1986–2002	Succeeded by Raymond Lahey
