= Archdiocese of Halifax–Yarmouth =

Catholic ecclesiastical territory

Coordinates: 44.6444°N 63.5733°W

Archdiocese of Halifax–Yarmouth Archidioecesis Halifaxiensis–Yarmuthensis
- Coat of Arms of the Archdiocese

Location
- Country: Canada
- Territory: Central Nova Scotia
- Ecclesiastical province: Halifax–Yarmouth
- Metropolitan: Halifax, Nova Scotia

Statistics
- Area: 34,055 km^{2} (13,149 sq mi)
- Population: Total; Catholics: (as of 2022); 807,605; 215,880 (26.7%)

Information
- Denomination: Roman Catholic
- Rite: Roman Rite
- Established: 4 September 1817
- Cathedral: St. Mary's Cathedral Basilica
- Co-cathedral: St. Ambrose Co-Cathedral

Current leadership
- Pope: Leo XIV
- Archbishop: Brian Joseph Dunn

Map

Website
- www.halifaxyarmouth.org

Archdiocese of Halifax–Yarmouth
Cathedrals:
1 St. Mary's Cathedral Basilica
2 St. Ambrose Co-Cathedral

The Roman Catholic Archdiocese of Halifax–Yarmouth (Latin: Archidioecesis Halifaxiensis–Yarmuthensis) is a Latin Church archdiocese that includes part of the civil province of Nova Scotia.

The Archdiocese of Halifax–Yarmouth has both a cathedral, St. Mary's Cathedral Basilica, in Halifax, and a co-cathedral St. Ambrose Co-Cathedral, in Yarmouth. Since 2020, the diocesan ordinary has been Archbishop Brian Dunn.

== History ==
In 1784, Catholics in the town of Halifax decided to build a church after the penal statutes against popery were repealed. A small chapel, St. Peter's, was erected on a site at the south end of the town of Halifax in July of that year. The wardens of St. Peter's also petitioned Bishop John Butler of Cork, Ireland to send Father James Jones, who knew many Irish settlers in Halifax and had expressed interest in coming to serve the church in North America.

In 1801, Bishop Pierre Denaut of Quebec, somewhat alarmed at the radical developments at St. Peter's parish in Halifax after Father James Jones' departure, had asked Father Edmund Burke, the Vicar General of Upper Canada, to move to Halifax to tackle the situation.

On territory originally a part of the Diocese of Quebec, including the whole of Nova Scotia, the future Diocese of Halifax was established on 4 September 1817 as the Apostolic Vicariate of Nova Scotia, a pre-diocesan jurisdiction entitled to a titular bishop and exempt (i.e., directly subject to the Holy See and not part of any ecclesiastical province), with Edmund Burke as the Vicar Apostolic of Nova Scotia. He was consecrated on 5 July 1818 as Titular Bishop of Sion by Bishop Joseph-Octave Plessis.

The apostolic vicariate was elevated to a bishopric on 15 February 1842 and on 22 September 1844 lost territory to establish the Roman Catholic Diocese of Arichat, now (as the Diocese of Antigonish) one of its suffragans.

In 1852, the Diocese of Halifax was elevated to an archdiocese and an ecclesiastical province was also created from dioceses of Arichat, Charlottetown and Fredericton, along with the Archdiocese of Halifax. Bishop William Walsh became the first Archbishop of Halifax.

It lost territory twice more: on 19 February 1953 to establish the Apostolic Prefecture of Bermuda Islands and on 6 July 1953 to establish the Roman Catholic Diocese of Yarmouth.

The Archdiocese of Halifax enjoyed a papal visit from Pope John Paul II in September 1984; that year was the 200th anniversary of the precedent set by the laity of Halifax of forcing the repeal of the anti-Catholic legislation in Nova Scotia, and the British Empire.

In December 2011, the Diocese of Yarmouth was merged back into the Archdiocese of Halifax, creating the Archdiocese of Halifax-Yarmouth, which was renamed by absorbing its title. Although canonically combined in one archdiocese, the corresponding civil statutory corporations of the former dioceses—the Roman Catholic Episcopal Corporation of Halifax (incorporated in 1849) and the Roman Catholic Episcopal Corporation of Yarmouth (incorporated in 1954)—continue to be treated as separate entities by Nova Scotia's Government.

In a diocesan report circulated in 2004, the Archdiocese of Halifax outlined a parish restructuring process in response to declining attendance, population growth in Halifax, rural population decline, a shortage of priests, and rising operational costs. The work on that restructuring process continued as a part of the 2017-2020 pastoral plan under Archbishop Mancini, with an implementation phase that would begin and be completed during 2020. The decrees of establishment for the reorganized parishes were published on 1 January 2020.

The former cathedral became the St. Ambrose Co-Cathedral, in Yarmouth, Nova Scotia.

== Extent and province ==
The Archdiocese of Halifax–Yarmouth covers 34,055 square kilometers. As of 2021, the archdiocese had 58 active diocesan priests, 7 religious priests, and 215,880 Catholics. It also had 87 women religious, 7 religious brothers, and 41 permanent deacons.

The metropolitan archbishop heads an ecclesiastical province which includes the suffragan dioceses of Antigonish and Charlottetown.

== Bishops ==
(all Roman Rite)

Apostolic Vicars of Nova Scotia

- Edmund Burke (1817.07.04 – 1820.11.29), Titular Bishop of Sion (1817.07.04 – 1820.11.29)
- Denis Lyons (1824.08.24 – 1824.10.19 not possessed), Titular Bishop of Tanis (1824.08.24 – 1824.10.19 not possessed)
- William Fraser (1825.06.03 – 1842.02.15 see below), Titular Bishop of Tanis (1825.06.03 – 1842.02.15)

Suffragan Bishops of Halifax

- William Fraser (1842.02.15 – 1844.09.27), later Bishop of Arichat (Canada) (1844.09.27 – 1851.10.04)
- William Walsh (1844.09.21 – 1852.05.04), previously Titular Bishop of Maximianopolis (1842.02.15 – 1844.09.21) & Coadjutor Bishop of Halifax (Canada) (1842.02.15 – 1844.09.21 see below); promoted the first Metropolitan Archbishop of Halifax (Canada) (1852.05.04 – 1858.08.10)

Metropolitan Archbishops of Halifax

- William Walsh ( see above 1852.05.04 – death 1858.08.10)
- Thomas Louis Connolly, Friars Minor (O.F.M.) (1859.04.08 – death 1876.07.27), previously Bishop of Saint John in America (Canada) (1852.05.04 – 1859.04.08)
- Michael Hannan (1877.02.16 – death 1882.04.17)
- Cornelius O'Brien (1882.12.01 – death 1906.03.09)
- Edward Joseph McCarthy (1906.06.27 – death 1931.01.26)
- Thomas O'Donnell (1931.01.26 – death 1936.01.13), previously Bishop of Victoria (Canada) (1923.12.23 – 1929.05.27), Titular Archbishop of Methymna (1929.05.27 – 1931.01.26), Coadjutor Archbishop of Halifax (Canada) (1929.05.27 – 1931.01.26)
- John Thomas McNally (1937.02.17 – death 1952.11.18), previously Bishop of Calgary (Canada) (1913.04.04 – 1924.08.12), Bishop of Hamilton (Canada) (1924.08.12 – 1937.02.17)
- Joseph Gerald Berry (1953.11.28 – 1967.05.12), President of the Canadian Conference of Catholic Bishops (1960 – 1964); previously Bishop of Peterborough (Canada) (1945.04.07 – 1953.11.28)
- James Hayes (1967.06.22 – 1990.11.06), President of the Canadian Conference of Catholic Bishops (1987 – 1989); previously Titular Bishop of Reperi (1965.02.05 – 1967.06.22) & Auxiliary Bishop of Halifax (1965.02.05 – 1967.06.22)
- Austin-Emile Burke (1991.07.08 – 1998.01.13), previously Bishop of Yarmouth (Canada) (1968.02.01 – 1991.07.08)
- Terrence Prendergast, Jesuits (S.J.) (1998.06.30 – 2007.05.14), previously Titular Bishop of Sléibhte (1995.02.22 – 1998.06.30) & Auxiliary Bishop of Toronto (Canada) (1995.02.22 – 1998.06.30); also Apostolic Administrator of Yarmouth (Canada) (2002.01.24 – 2007.05.14); later Metropolitan Archbishop of Ottawa (Canada) (2007.05.14 – ...)
- Apostolic Administrator Claude Champagne, Missionary Oblates of Mary Immaculate (O.M.I.) (2007.07.13 – 2007.10.18)
- Anthony Mancini (2007.10.18 – 2009.10.22 see below), also Apostolic Administrator of Yarmouth (Canada) (2007.10.18 – 2009.10.22), Apostolic Administrator of Antigonish (Canada) (2009.09.26 – 2009.11.21); previously Titular Bishop of Natchitoches (1999.02.18 – 2007.10.18) & Auxiliary Bishop of Montréal (Canada) (1999.02.18 – 2007.10.18)

Metropolitan Archbishops of Halifax-Yarmouth

- Anthony Mancini (see above 2009.10.22 – 2020.11.27)
- Brian Joseph Dunn (2020.11.27 – present)

Coadjutor bishops

- Thomas Maguire (1819), as Coadjutor Vicar Apostolic: did not take effect
- William Walsh (1842 – 1844)
- Thomas O'Donnell (1929 – 1931)
- Brian Joseph Dunn (2019 – 2020)

Other priests of this diocese who became bishops

- Colin Campbell, appointed Bishop of Antigonish, Nova Scotia in 1986
- Martin William Currie, Bishop of Grand Falls, Newfoundland (2001 – 2011) and Archbishop of St. John's, Newfoundland (2007 – 2018)
- Richard William Smith, appointed Bishop of Pembroke, Ontario in 2002

== Sources and external links ==
- Official website
- GigaCatholic, with incumbent biography links
- Chisholm, Joseph Andrew (1910). "Archdiocese of Halifax" . In Herbermann, Charles (ed.). Catholic Encyclopedia. Vol. 7. New York: Robert Appleton Company.
