= William Edward Power =

Canadian bishop (1915–2003)

- Bishop of Antigonish
- Church: Catholic Church
- Diocese: Diocese of Antigonish
- In office: 12 May 1960 – 12 December 1986
- Predecessor: John Roderick MacDonald
- Successor: Colin Campbell

Orders
- Ordination: 7 June 1941 by Joseph Charbonneau
- Consecration: 20 July 1960 by Paul-Émile Léger

Personal details
- Born: December 27, 1915 Montreal, Quebec, Dominion of Canada
- Died: November 29, 2003 (aged 87)

William Edward Power (September 27, 1915 - November 29, 2003) was consecrated Bishop of the Diocese of Antigonish, Canada on July 20, 1960: installed August 10, 1960: resigned December 17, 1986. Power died in 2003.

Catholic Church titles
| Preceded by John Roderick MacDonald | Bishop of Antigonish; 1960–1986 | Succeeded by Colin Campbell |
