= Bertram Orth =

German-born Canadian prelate of the Catholic Church (1848–1931)

The Most Reverend Bertram Orth
- Archbishop of Victoria
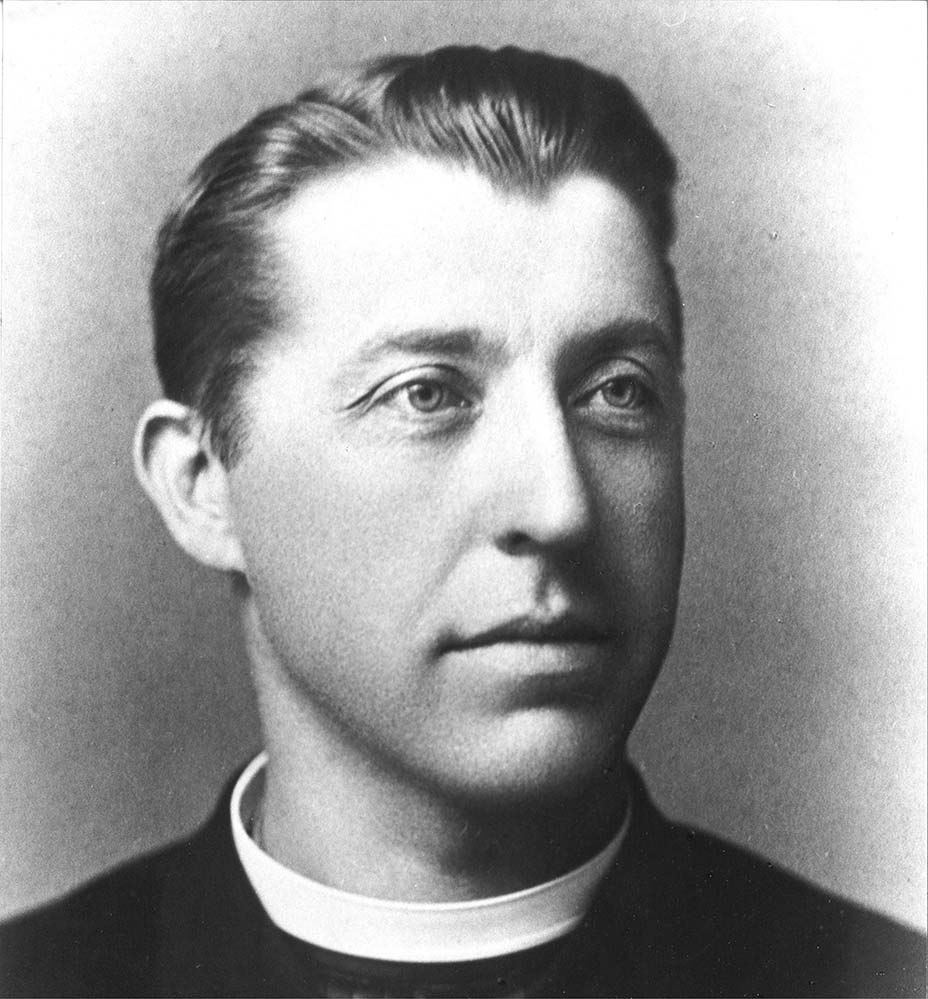
- Church: Catholic
- See: Victoria (Note: The see was originally known as the Diocese of Vancouver Island (erected in 1846). In June 1903, during Ott's term as the see's ordinary, the diocese was elevated and became known as the Archdiocese of Vancouver Island. In September 1904, the see was renamed to Archdiocese of Victoria (Latin: Victoriensis in Insula Vancouver). Finally, after Ott's resignation, but before a successor was appointed, the see was lowered to a diocese to become the Diocese of Victoria (a suffragan to the Metropolitan Archdiocese of Vancouver).)
- Appointed: March 24, 1900
- Retired: May 3, 1908
- Predecessor: Alexander Christie
- Successor: Alexander MacDonald
- Other post(s): Titular Archbishop of Amasea (1908–1931); Archbishop Emeritus of Victoria (1908–1931)

Orders
- Ordination: July 25, 1872 by Giacomo Cattani
- Consecration: June 10, 1900 by Alexander Christie

Personal details
- Born: December 11, 1848; Lohmar, North Rhine-Westphalia, Germany
- Died: February 10, 1931 (aged 82); Fiesole, Tuscany, Italy

Bertram Orth (December 11, 1848 – February 10, 1931) was a German-born Canadian prelate of the Catholic Church. He led the Diocese of Victoria from 1900 to 1908, becoming its first and only archbishop in 1903.

== Biography ==
=== Early life ===
Bertram Orth was born on December 11, 1848, in the Algert district of Lohmar, near Cologne, to Johannes Wilhelm Orth and Anna Catharina Müller. He entered the American College of Louvain in 1868, studying to become a missionary priest for the Archdiocese of Oregon City. He was ordained to the priesthood on July 25, 1872, by Archbishop Giacomo Cattani, the Apostolic Nuncio to Belgium.

=== Priesthood in Oregon ===
Upon his arrival in Oregon in 1872, Orth was appointed to the faculty of St. Michael's College, a school for boys in Portland. He was sent to St. Anne's Mission among the Cayuse people at the Umatilla Indian Reservation in 1873, and appointed pastor of St. Andrew's Church at Canyon City in 1875. In Canyon City, he established a schoolhouse and served as its only teacher. By March 1876, the school had 41 students, 29 of them Catholic, ranging in age from five to 12.

In 1877, Orth became an assistant to Rev. John Fierens at St. Mary's Cathedral in Portland. From 1883 to 1900, he was the founding pastor of St. Lawrence's Church in Portland. In addition to his pastoral duties, he served as editor of the archdiocese's newspaper, the Catholic Sentinel (1881-1882, 1897-1898).

=== Episcopal career in Canada ===
On March 24, 1900, Orth was appointed Bishop of Vancouver Island by Pope Leo XIII. He received his episcopal consecration on the following June 10 from Archbishop Alexander Christie, with Bishops Alphonse Glorieux and Edward O'Dea serving as co-consecrators, at St. Andrew's Cathedral.

Though located in British Columbia, the Diocese of Vancouver Island was a suffragan diocese of the American Archdiocese of Oregon City, creating a politically difficult situation that was opposed by Prime Minister Wilfrid Laurier. In June 1903, in one of the final acts of Pope Leo XIII before his death in July, the diocese was elevated to the rank of a metropolitan archdiocese and Orth became its first archbishop. The archdiocese was renamed the Archdiocese of Victoria by Pope Pius X in September 1904.

At the beginning of Orth's tenure in 1900, the Diocese of Vancouver Island contained 14 priests, 26 churches including 11 parishes and 15 missions, seven parochial schools with 400 students, and a Catholic population of 9,000. By the end of his tenure in 1908, the Archdiocese of Victoria contained 20 priests, 30 churches including 15 parishes and 15 missions, nine parochial schools with 450 students, and a Catholic population of 15,000. Orth built a new episcopal residence, founded the diocesan newspaper The Orphans' Friend, added stained glass windows and a new organ to St. Andrew's Cathedral, and introduced the Company of Mary and Benedictines to the diocese.

=== Resignation and later life ===
Orth found himself in serious conflict with Rev. Peter Joseph Nicolaye, whom Orth removed from his position as vicar general in 1903. In 1907, Nicolaye called a meeting of the diocesan clergy to investigate accusations of sexual misconduct made by two women against Orth. These accusations were forwarded to Rome, along with charges of Jansenism being made against Orth by Nicolaye. The authorities at the Vatican dismissed the charges against Orth as "contradictions, machinations, exaggerations and perhaps intrigue all hiding at the bottom of...[this] disgraceful affair," but nevertheless requested Orth's resignation rather than have him serve under a cloud of suspicion and scandal.

Jeremiah J. Crowley, a former Catholic priest who later became an anti-Catholic writer, alluded to the situation in Romanism: A Menace to the Nation (1912), mentioning Orth first among "those who have been compelled to flee to escape chastisement, or perhaps death, from outraged husbands, fathers, brothers..." Orth’s successor, Bishop Alexander MacDonald, said in 1909: "Archbishop Orth was...summoned to Rome to answer foul charges laid against him. Cardinal Gotti, who examined the charges, himself told me they were without foundation, but the Archbishop elected rather to resign than go back."

Orth's resignation was announced on May 3, 1908, and he was given the honorary title of Titular Archbishop of Amasea. His resignation was publicly attributed to "reasons of health" and he retired to Italy, where he would spend the rest of his life while also serving as a chaplain to a congregation of nuns. In October 1908, following Orth's resignation, the Archdiocese of Victoria was demoted to a simple diocese under the Archdiocese of Vancouver.

23 years after his resignation, Orth died on February 10, 1931, in Fiesole, near Florence, at age 82.

== Notes ==
Catholic Church titles
Preceded by Alexander Christie	Archbishop of Victoria; 1900–1908	Succeeded by Alexander MacDonald
