= Life of prayer and penance =

Penalty imposed on clergy by the Catholic Church

In the Catholic Church, imposing a life of prayer and penance is a type of penalty used to punish clergy for crimes and misconduct. It is typically imposed on elderly priests as opposed to younger priests, who may face harsher penalties.

== Description ==
It is similar to house arrest and while implementation of the penalty may vary, it usually includes banning the person from public ministry and limiting his interactions with others. It may also involve restricting or altogether denying access to telephones or televisions.

For example, in the Archdiocese of Philadelphia, Cardinal Justin Rigali established a program for clergy sentenced to lifetime of prayer and penance that prohibits them from celebrating Mass publicly, administering the sacraments, wearing clerical garb, or presenting themselves as priests; and they are monitored full-time by a former probation officer. Violations of the restrictions may result in full dismissal from the clerical status. According to canonist Damián Astigueta, the majority of priests who agree to abide by the life of prayer and penance "want to be helped and recognize that this penalty is a table of salvation for them."

== See also ==
- Loss of clerical state
- Defrocking
