= John Roderick MacDonald =

- Bishop of Antigonish
- Church: Roman Catholic Church
- See: Roman Catholic Diocese of Antigonish
- In office: 1950–1959
- Predecessor: James Morrison
- Successor: William Edward Power

Orders
- Ordination: January 23, 1916
- Consecration: August 24, 1943 by Mgr Ildebrando Antoniutti

Personal details
- Born: July 9, 1891
- Died: December 18, 1959 (aged 68)
- Denomination: Roman Catholic Church
- Occupation: bishop
- Profession: priest

Styles of John Roderick MacDonald
- Reference style: His Excellency
- Spoken style: Your Excellency
- Religious style: Bishop

John Roderick MacDonald (July 9, 1891 – December 18, 1959) was consecrated as Bishop of Peterborough, Ontario, August 24, 1943; appointed Titular Bishop of Ancusa and Coadjutor-Bishop of Antigonish with right of succession March 3, 1945; succeeded Archbishop James Morrison to the See April 13, 1950; died December 18, 1959.

Catholic Church titles
Preceded by Denis P. O'Connor	Bishop of Peterborough; 1943–1945	Succeeded by Joseph Gerald Berry

Catholic Church titles
Preceded by Saturnino Peri	Titular Bishop of Ancusa; 1945–1950	Succeeded by Bonaventura Porta

Catholic Church titles
Preceded by James Morrison	Bishop of Antigonish; 1950–1959	Succeeded by William Edward Power
