= Sion (Asia Minor) =

Ancient city in the Roman province of Asia Prima

Sion is an ancient city in the Roman province of Asia Prima, in Asia Minor.

== Ecclesiastical history ==
Sion was a bishopric, suffragan of the Metropolitan of the provincial capital Ephesus. It nominally restored as a Roman Catholic titular bishopric and promoted to titular archbishopric in 1950.
