= James Morrison (bishop) =

- (Arch)Bishop of Antigonish
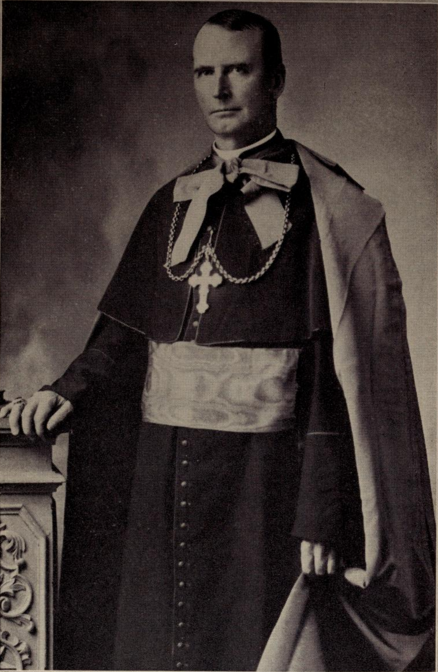
- Church: Catholic Church
- Diocese: Diocese of Antigonish
- In office: 15 May 1912 – 13 April 1950
- Predecessor: John Cameron
- Successor: John Roderick MacDonald

Orders
- Ordination: 1 November 1889 by Giulio Lenti
- Consecration: 4 September 1912 by Pellegrino Francesco Stagni

Personal details
- Born: 9 July 1861 Savage Harbour, Colony of Prince Edward Island, British Empire
- Died: 13 April 1950 (aged 88) Antigonish, Nova Scotia, Canada, British Empire

James Morrison (9 July 1861 – 13 April 1950) was the longest-serving bishop of the Diocese of Antigonish, Nova Scotia, Canada. Although one of the last powerful and austere Roman Catholic bishops in Canada, Morrison presided over a diocese that created one of the most successful Catholic social movements in the country.

Morrison strictly adhered to the statutes of the Roman Catholic faith. Extremely skeptical of debt, he was cautious in all matters relating to church finances. As Bishop of Antigonish he gained the ire of Rev. James Tompkins and other priests for refusing to allow St. Francis Xavier University to join a non-denominational university in Halifax, Nova Scotia. Although highly respected by the Catholic community, his cautious and frugal nature did not always foster tranquility.

== Brief biography ==
James Morrison was born in the rural village of Savage Harbour, Prince Edward Island. He was educated at the Charlottetown Normal College and at Saint Dunstan's University from 1882–1884. He attended the Urban College of the Congregatio de Propaganda Fide in Rome from 1884–1889. Ordained for the Diocese of Charlottetown, Morrison held numerous positions, including Rector of St. Dunstan's University, 1892–1895, Vicar-general, 1904–1912 and formal diocesan administrator, 1911–1912.

Father Morrison had been vicar general, in the Diocese of Charlottetown, PEI, Canada, when in 1908, Bishop McDonald became a complete invalid. At this point Morrison assumed administrative control of the diocese until the latter part of 1912. When Bishop McDonald died in 1912, Bishop O’Leary succeeded, whilst Father Morrison was further ordained bishop in September 1912.

Consecrated as Bishop of Antigonish on 4 September 1912, Morrison took over a diocese that was riddled with economic and political turmoil and wholly unprepared for the challenges of the twentieth century. He guided the diocese through two world wars, the challenges of economic decline, emigration and industrial unrest. He supported and fostered the St. Francis Xavier University extension department, which aspired to alleviate some of the economic and social problems of the Maritime Provinces, although historians disagree about the extent and reasons for this support. He was appointed Archbishop (ad personam) in 1944.

When he died in 1950 he was the longest-serving of all Canadian Catholic prelates. From a historical perspective Morrison was one of an extremely few native born, pre-Confederation (1867) Canadians to later become an archbishop.

== Career highlights ==
- 1884 - Graduates from St. Dunstan's University
- 1889 - Graduates from Urban College with doctorates in Philosophy and Divinity
- 1 November 1889 - Ordained a priest in the chapel of the Propaganda College by Msgr. Lenti.
- 1891 - Joins the staff of St. Dunstan's University
- 1892 - Appointed Rector of St. Dunstan's University
- 1904 - Appointed Vicar-general of the Diocese of Charlottetown
- 1905 - Awarded an honorary degree by St. Francis Xavier University
- 1907 - Parish priest, Vernon River, Prince Edward Island
- 1911 - Appointed Apostolic Administrator of the Diocese of Charlottetown
- 4 September 1912 - Consecrated Bishop of Antigonish in St. Ninian's Cathedral, Antigonish
- 1944 - Appointed Archbishop ad personam
- 13 April 1950 - dies in Antigonish, Nova Scotia, aged 88

Catholic Church titles
| Preceded by John Cameron | Bishop of Antigonish; 1912–1950 | Succeeded by John Roderick MacDonald |
