= St. Mary's Basilica (Halifax, Nova Scotia) =

Saint Mary's Cathedral Basilica
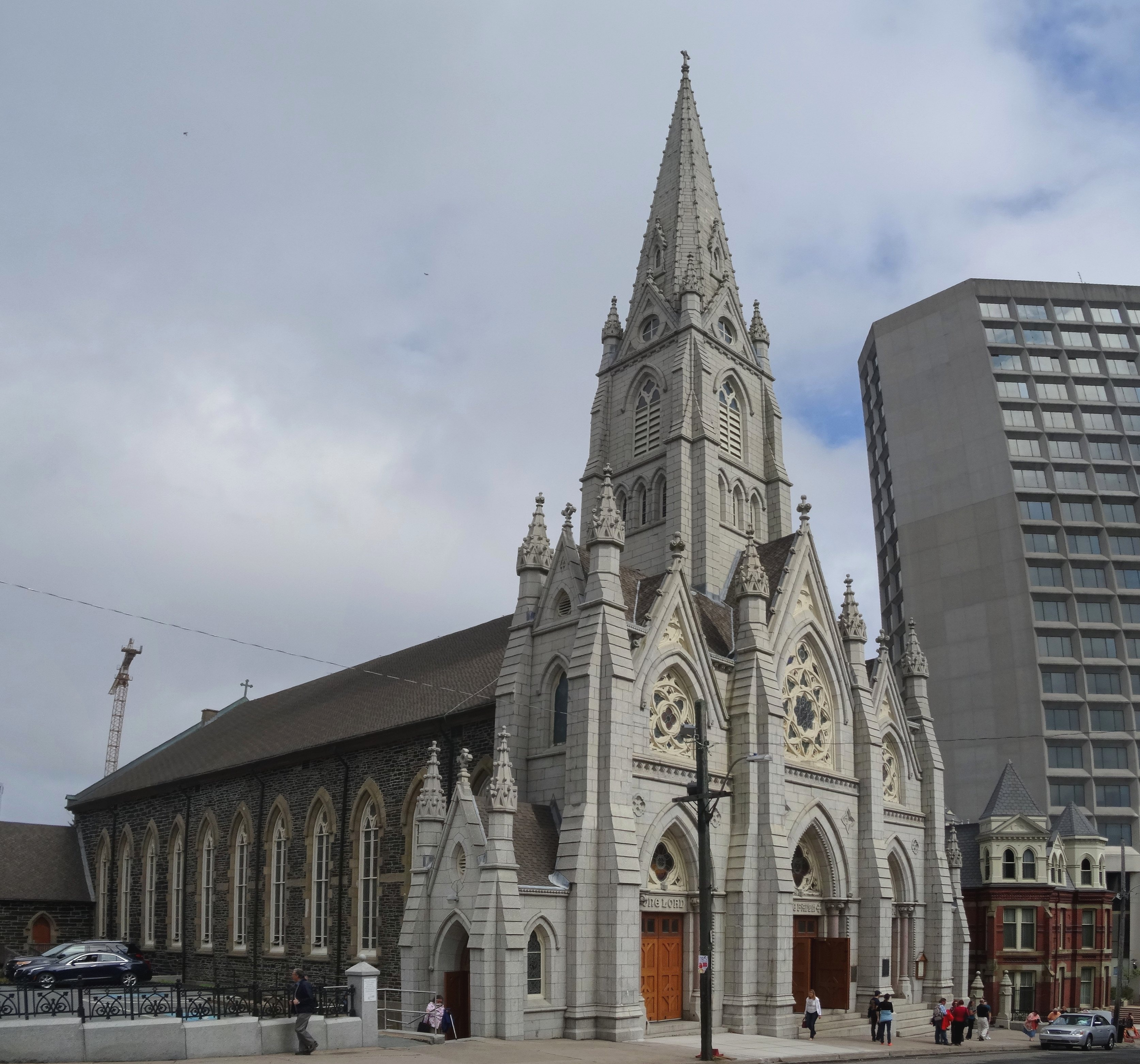
- Saint Mary's Cathedral Basilica in 2016
- Saint Mary's Cathedral Basilica
- 44°38′40″N 63°34′23.69″W
- Location: 5221 Spring Garden Road; Halifax, Nova Scotia; B3J 1Z3
- Denomination: Roman Catholic
- Website: stmcathedral.com

History
- Status: Cathedral, minor basilica
- Consecrated: 19 October 1899

Architecture
- Functional status: Active
- Architectural type: Norman-Gothic

Specifications
- Materials: Granite

Administration
- Archdiocese: Archdiocese of Halifax-Yarmouth

National Historic Site of Canada
- Official name: St. Mary's Basilica National Historic Site of Canada
- Designated: 1997

Nova Scotia Heritage Property Act
- Official name: St. Mary's Basilica
- Type: Provincially Registered Property
- Designated: April 4, 1984
- Reference no.: 00PNS0025

St. Mary's Cathedral Basilica is a Gothic Revival Catholic cathedral located in the downtown core of Halifax, the capital of Nova Scotia. It is the cathedral of the Archdiocese of Halifax-Yarmouth and is the largest Catholic church in the Archdiocese. Consecrated on 19 October 1899.

Pope Pius XII raised the shrine to the status of Minor Basilica via his decree Quas Moles et Pulchritido on 14 June 1950. The decree was signed and notarized by Apostolic Chancellor Ermenegildo Brugnola.

The St. Mary's Cathedral Basilica boasts the tallest granite spire in North America.

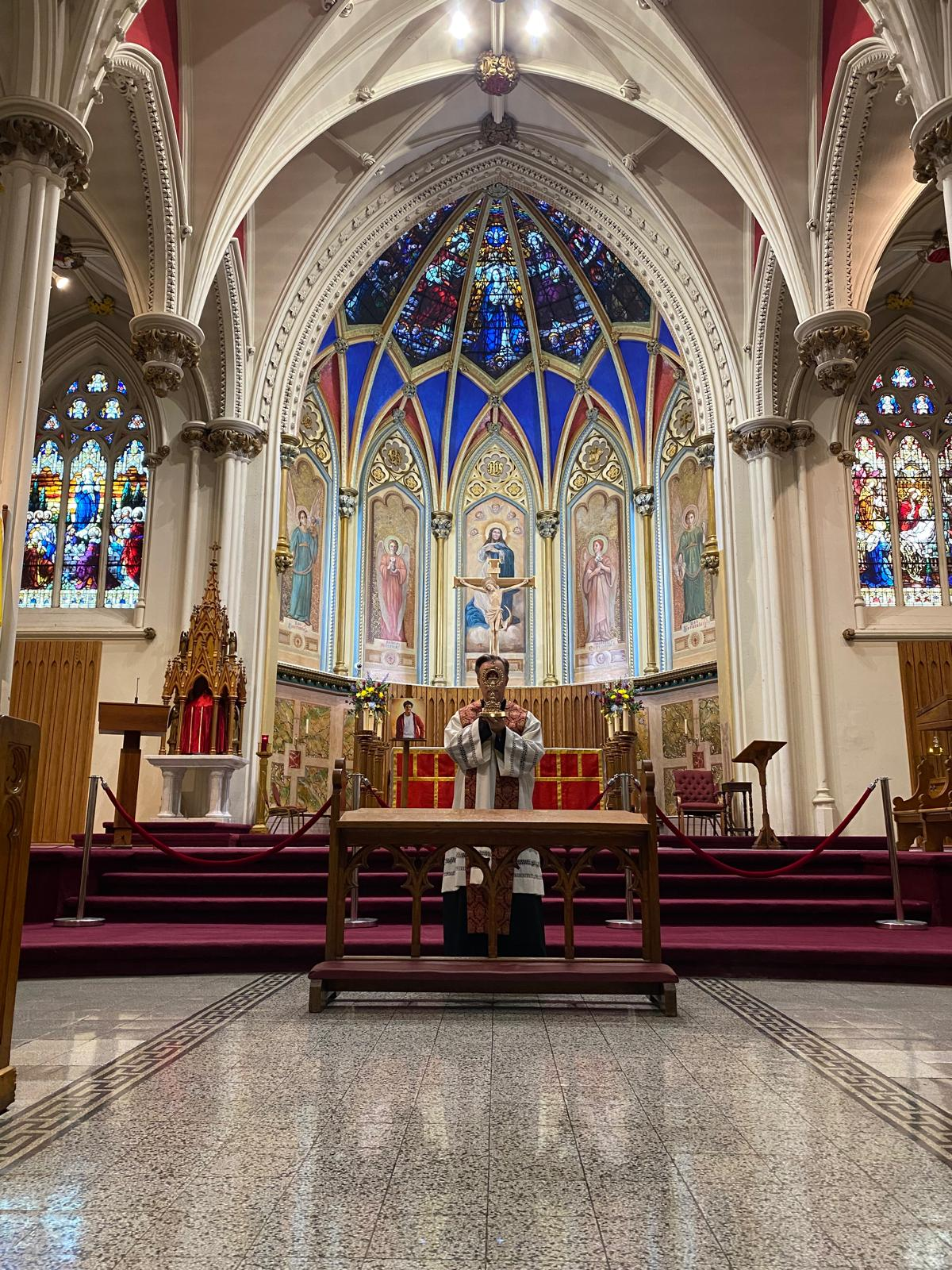
A public veneration of a relic of the heart of Saint Carlo Acutis at Saint Mary's Cathedral Basilica

== History ==
The church has been significantly expanded and altered over time. Originally constructed of wood, it was replaced by a stone structure beginning in 1820 inspired (as were many churches of the day) by Saint Martin in the Fields in London. It was expanded to its present size beginning in 1869, according to designs of Patrick Keely who introduced the Gothic Revival façade and spire. Besides the Gothic features, the spire also includes Norman and Germanic design elements.

The church enjoyed a papal visit from Pope John Paul II in September 1984; that year was the 200th anniversary of the precedent set by the laity of Halifax of forcing the repeal of the anti-Catholic legislation in Nova Scotia, and the British Empire.

The basilica was designated a National Historic Site of Canada in 1997.

The church was heavily damaged in the Halifax Explosion on 6 December 1917. All of the stained glass windows were shattered by the force of the blast, and tiny pieces of glass were embedded in the walls. In addition to being peppered by the glass shards, the paintings on the walls suffered water damage from a blizzard which entered the church through the broken windows. The murals were covered over with white paint in the 1950s. In June 2019, work was begun to remove the layers of white paint (using scalpels) and restore damaged portions of the paintings—a project expected to continue until 2024.

In 2024, Saint Mary's Cathedral Basilica welcomed the relic of Saint Carlo Acutis as part of the Archdiocese of Halifax-Yarmouth's Eucharistic congress. The congress also coincided with the 125th anniversary of the church's dedication.

== Architectural style ==
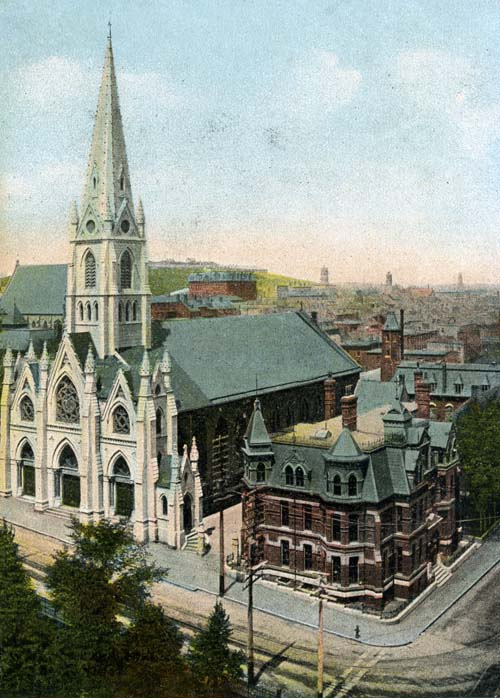
St. Mary's Cathedral, in a postcard

The stone structure from 1820 was inspired by Saint Martin in the Fields in London. In 1869, Patrick Keely introduced the Gothic Revival style to the structure in the façade and spire, which are notable for being built entirely of granite. Except for the three portals which have jamb shafts of pink Aberdeen granite, all of the stone was locally obtained. The granite spire with the height of 189 feet (58 m) is a prominent architectural feature of Halifax. There are 11 bells in the tower controlled by a carillon using a keyboard. The sounding notes are in the scale of F# major extending to the A# a major 10th above. There is also an F natural. When the keys are pressed, the notes sound an augmented 4th higher than played. Besides the Gothic features, the spire also includes Norman and Germanic design elements.

== Cemetery ==
St. Peter's Cemetery, located to the west of St. Mary's Basilica, is the oldest Catholic cemetery in Halifax, created when the original chapel was built at the site of the basilica in 1784. The St. Peter's Cemetery served as the main Catholic burial place in Halifax until 1843 when it was replaced by Holy Cross Cemetery.

== See also ==
- List of oldest buildings and structures in Halifax, Nova Scotia
- List of oldest buildings in Canada
