= John Cameron (Canadian bishop) =

Canadian Roman Catholic priest (1827–1910)

- Bishop of Antigonish
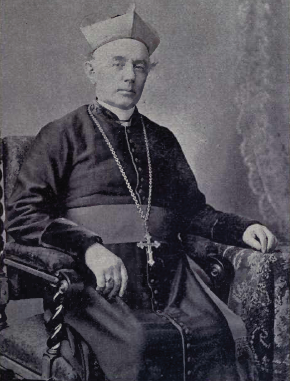
- Installed: July 17, 1877
- Term ended: April 6, 1910
- Predecessor: Colin Francis MacKinnon
- Successor: James Morrison

Orders
- Ordination: July 26, 1853
- Consecration: May 22, 1870

Personal details
- Born: February 16, 1827 St. Andrews, Nova Scotia
- Died: April 6, 1910 (aged 83) Antigonish, Nova Scotia

John Cameron (16 February 1827 – 6 April 1910) was a Canadian Roman Catholic priest and Bishop of Antigonish.
