= Williams Point, Nova Scotia =

Community in Nova Scotia, Canada

Williams Point
- Community
- Interactive map of Williams Point
- Coordinates: 45.6293°N 61.9443°W
- Country: Canada
- Province: Nova Scotia
- County: Antigonish County
- Town proximity: Near Antigonish
- Time zone: UTC−4 (AST)
  - Summer (DST): UTC−3 (ADT)

Williams Point is a small community in the Canadian province of Nova Scotia, located in Antigonish County.
