= Causeway: A Passage from Innocence =

- First edition cover of Canadian release
- Author: Linden MacIntyre
- Subject: Construction
- Genre: Non-fiction
- Publisher: HarperCollins
- Publication date: August 24, 2006
- Publication place: Canada
- Media type: Print (Hardcover & Paperback)
- Pages: 320 pp.
- ISBN: 9780002007245

Causeway: A Passage from Innocence is a non-fiction book, written by Canadian writer Linden MacIntyre, first published in August 2006 by HarperCollins. In the book, the author recounts the 1950s construction of the Canso Causeway, linking Cape Breton to mainland Nova Scotia. MacIntyre reflects on changing ways of life and his relationship with his father. Causeway is a strong narrative of changing times and vanishing landscapes.

== About the author ==
MacIntyre is a distinguished broadcaster, born in St. Lawrence, Newfoundland and Labrador, and raised in Port Hastings, Cape Breton. He began his career reporting news at the Halifax Chronicle-Herald, joining CBC Television in 1976 as a story editor. MacIntyre would soon host his own program, "The MacIntyre File". He moved to Toronto in 1980 re-joining CBC, where he co-hosted the public affairs program The Fifth Estate until 2014.

== Awards and honours ==
Causeway received the 2007 "Edna Staebler Award for Creative Non-Fiction".
