= James Martin Hayes =

Canadian Roman Catholic bishop

The Most Reverend James Hayes
- Archbishop of Halifax
- Church: Latin Church
- See: Halifax
- In office: 1967–1990
- Predecessor: Joseph Gerald Berry
- Successor: Austin-Emile Burke

Orders
- Ordination: June 15, 1947

Personal details
- Born: May 27, 1924 Halifax, Nova Scotia, Canada
- Died: August 2, 2016 (aged 92) Halifax, Nova Scotia, Canada

James Martin Hayes (May 27, 1924 – August 2, 2016) was a Canadian prelate of the Catholic Church.

Hayes was born in Halifax, Nova Scotia, and ordained a priest on June 15, 1947. He was appointed auxiliary bishop to the Archdiocese of Halifax, as well as titular bishop of Reperi, on February 5, 1965, and consecrated on April 20, 1965. Hayes participated at the Second Vatican Council. Pope Paul VI appointed him archbishop of the Archdiocese of Halifax on June 22, 1967. He was known as a leader in liturgical renewal. He resigned on November 6, 1990, and died on August 2, 2016, in a hospital in Halifax, Nova Scotia. He was 92.

Catholic Church titles
Preceded by Joseph Gerald Berry	Archbishop of Halifax; 1967-1990	Succeeded by Austin-Emile Burke
