= Brian Joseph Dunn =

Canadian prelate of the Catholic Church

His Grace Brian Dunn
- Archbishop of Halifax-Yarmouth
- Church: Latin Church
- Appointed: 27 November 2020
- Predecessor: Anthony Mancini
- Previous post: Bishop of Antigonish (2009–2019)

Orders
- Ordination: 28 August 1980
- Consecration: 9 October 2008 by Jean-Louis Plouffe

Personal details
- Born: Brian Joseph Dunn; 8 January 1955 (age 71) St. John's, Newfoundland, Canada
- Denomination: Catholic
- Coat of arms

Brian Joseph Dunn (born 1955) is a Canadian prelate of the Catholic Church who is Archbishop of Halifax-Yarmouth. He was Bishop of Antigonish from 2010 to 2019.

== Early years ==
Born in St. John's, Newfoundland, Dunn was raised in the mining community of Buchans where he attended primary and elementary school before moving to the fishing community of Harbour Grace where he attended secondary school.

Dunn attended Memorial University of Newfoundland for one year before transferring to King's University College of the University of Western Ontario where he graduated with a BA in 1976. Dunn completed seminary formation at St. Peter's Seminary, graduating with a MDiv in 1979. Dunn undertook post-graduate studies and graduated with a JCL and JCD from St. Paul University in 1990 and 1991 respectively. He completed an MTh at University of Notre Dame in 2006.

== Priest ==
Dunn was ordained a priest in the Diocese of Grand Falls on 28 August 1980, where he served as a Parochial Vicar (Associate Pastor) at the Cathedral of the Immaculate Conception in Grand Falls-Windsor from 1980 to 1985.

Dunn then served as Pastor of St. Gabriel's Parish in St. Brendan's from 1985 to 1988, and then as Pastor of the Cathedral of the Immaculate Conception in Grand Falls from 1991 to 1996. He was subsequently Pastor of St. Joseph's Parish in Harbour Breton from 1996 to 1999, followed by the position of Pastor for both Holy Cross Parish in Holyrood and St. Peter and St. Paul Parish in Harbour Main from 1999 to 2002.

Dunn served the Diocese of Grand Falls as Vice-Chancellor (1980–1996), Chancellor (1996–2008), Member of the College of Consultors (1991–2002), Bishop's Canonical Advisor (1990–2008), Judge for the Marriage Tribunal (1990–2008), and Associate Judicial Vicar of the Marriage Tribunal (2002–2008).

Dunn has also served a lecturer with the Atlantic School of Theology (1992–1999) for the Diploma Program for Theology and Ministry, lecturer in the Faculty of Canon Law at St. Paul University (2003–2004, 2007), and served on the faculty at St. Peter's Seminary (2002–2008) where he taught courses in Canon Law, Ecumenism, Ecclesiology, and Liturgical Law; he served as Dean of Studies from 2005 to 2008.

== Bishop ==
On 16 July 2008, Pope Benedict XVI named Dunn auxiliary bishop of the Diocese of Sault Sainte Marie. He received his episcopal consecration from Bishop Jean-Louis Plouffe at Cathedral of the Immaculate Conception in Grand Falls, Newfoundland and Labrador on 9 October.

On 21 November 2009, Pope Benedict appointed Dunn Bishop of Antigonish. Dunn was installed on 25 January 2010. He replaced Raymond Lahey, who was facing charges of possessing and importing child pornography. He became ex officio Chancellor of St. Francis Xavier University as well.

Dunn was elected to participate in the 13th Ordinary General Assembly of the Synod of Bishops on the New Evangelization in October 2012. He spoke on methods of evangelizing victims of clerical sexual abuse. He proposed "the appointment of pastoral teams consisting of clergy and laity, an official reflection on and recognition of lay ecclesial ministers, a deliberate and systematic involvement and leadership of women at all levels of Church life, e.g., permitting women to be instituted as lectors and acolytes and the institution of the ministry of catechist".

On 13 April 2019, Pope Francis named Dunn Archbishop Coadjutor of Halifax-Yarmouth.

On 27 November 2020, Pope Francis accepted the resignation of Archbishop Anthony Mancini. As Coadjutor Archbishop, Dunn succeeded Archbishop Mancini as head of the Archdiocese.

Dunn is the Grand Prior of the Canada-Atlantic Lieutenancy of the Equestrian Order of the Holy Sepulchre of Jerusalem.

Catholic Church titles
Preceded by Raymond Lahey	Bishop of Antigonish; 2010–2019	Succeeded by Wayne Kirkpatrick
Preceded by Anthony Mancini	Archbishop of Halifax–Yarmouth; 2020–present	Incumbent
