= Alexander MacDonald (Canadian bishop) =

Canadian Catholic bishop (1858–1941)

- Bishop of Victoria, British Columbia
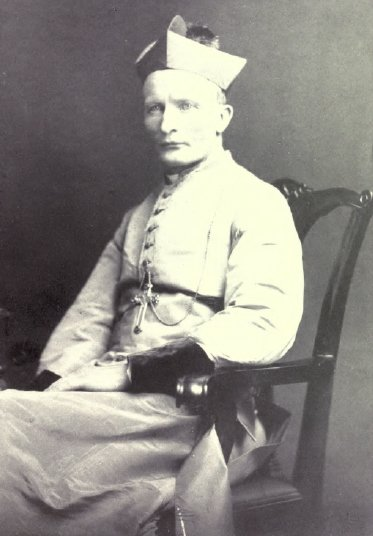
- Diocese: Victoria
- Installed: October 1, 1908
- Term ended: June 6, 1923
- Predecessor: Bertram Orth
- Successor: Thomas O'Donnell

Orders
- Ordination: March 8, 1884

Personal details
- Born: February 18, 1858 Inverness County, Cape Breton Island, Nova Scotia
- Died: February 24, 1941 (aged 83)

Alexander MacDonald (February 18, 1858 – February 24, 1941) was a Canadian Roman Catholic priest, educator, author, and Bishop of Victoria, British Columbia.

== Biography ==
Born in Inverness County, Cape Breton Island, Nova Scotia, the son of Finlay and Catherine (Beaton) MacDonald, MacDonald was educated in the common schools of Inverness County and attended St. Francis Xavier College (now St. Francis Xavier University) in Antigonish, Nova Scotia. In 1879, he went to Rome and studied philosophy and theology at the Propaganda College graduating in 1884. He was ordained in St. John Lateran church in Rome, by Lucido Maria Cardinal Parocchi on March 8, 1884. In 1884, he returned to back to Nova Scotia where he was appointed teacher of Latin and philosophy at St. Francis Xavier College. In 1900, he was appointed vicar general of his diocese and three years later was given charge of St. Andrew's parish in Antigonish County, Nova Scotia. In 1908, he was appointed Bishop of Victoria and resigned in 1923.

He was the author of a number of religious books including The Symbol Of The Apostles: A Vindication Of The Apostolic Authorship Of The Creed On The Lines Of Catholic Tradition (1903), The symbol in sermons: a series of twenty-five short sermons on the articles of the Creed (1903), The mercies of the Sacred Heart: twelve sermons for the first Fridays (1904), Questions of the day: thoughts on the Biblical question (1905), The sacraments: a course of seven sermons (1908).
