= Linden MacIntyre =

Canadian journalist, broadcaster and novelist

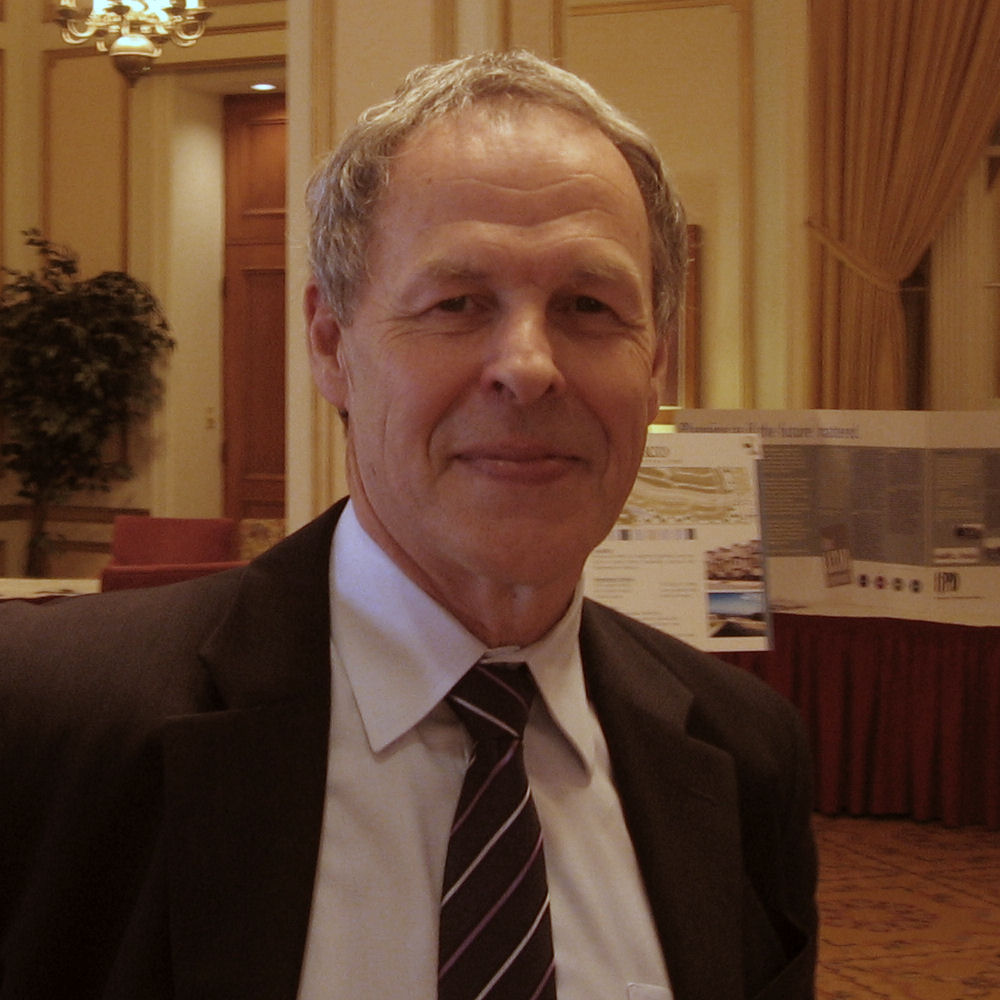
- Macintyre in May 2008
- Born: Linden Joseph MacIntyre; May 29, 1943 (age 83); St. Lawrence, Dominion of Newfoundland
- Occupations: Writer, broadcaster, journalist
- Spouse: Carol Off (m. 2000)
- Children: 5
- Writing career
- Period: 1964 - present
- Genres: Non-fiction, fiction
- Notable works: The Bishop's Man, Who Killed Ty Conn
- Notable awards: 2009 Scotiabank Giller Prize; 2010 Libris Fiction Book of the Year Award

Linden Joseph MacIntyre (born May 29, 1943) is a Canadian journalist, broadcaster and novelist. He has won ten Gemini Awards, an International Emmy and numerous other awards for writing and journalistic excellence, including the 2009 Scotiabank Giller Prize for his 2009 novel, The Bishop's Man. Well known for many years for his stories on CBC's The Fifth Estate, in 2014 he announced his retirement from the show at age 71. His final story, broadcast on November 21, 2014, was "The Interrogation Room" about police ethics and improper interrogation room tactics.

== Life and career ==
One of three children of Dan Rory MacIntyre and Alice Donohue, he was raised in Port Hastings, Nova Scotia. The Donohue family was from Bay St. Lawrence, a small fishing community in northern Cape Breton, who were originally from Ireland. As a miner, his father was rarely at home. MacIntyre has said, "The old fellow decided the family would stay in the community and he would go away and stay as long as it took. ... My mother was a teacher and my sisters and I stayed with her."

After high school, MacIntyre moved to Antigonish, Nova Scotia, where in 1964 he obtained a Bachelor of Arts degree from St. Francis Xavier University. He also studied at St. Mary's University and the University of King's College in Halifax. From 1964 to 1967 he worked for the Halifax Herald as a parliamentary reporter in Ottawa. He continued in the same role with the Financial Times of Canada from 1967 to 1970. He was drawn back to Cape Breton after the death of his father in 1970 and for the next six years he lived there and worked as a correspondent for the Chronicle Herald.

He joined the Canadian Broadcasting Corporation in Halifax in 1976 and for three years he hosted a regional public affairs show called The MacIntyre File. It was with this program that he launched a successful legal challenge before the Supreme Court of Nova Scotia over access to affidavits and documents relating to search warrants. Later heard before the Supreme Court of Canada, the successful suit was a landmark case which set a precedent in support of public and media access to information in Canada.

In 1980, MacIntyre moved to Toronto, where he still resides, to work as a producer and journalist and in 1981 he joined CBC's new flagship news program, The Journal.

His work took him around the world preparing documentary reports on international affairs, preparing such notable features as 1981's "Dirty Sky, Dying Water" (about acid rain). From 1986 to 1988 he was host and national editor of CBC Radio's flagship show, Sunday Morning. In 1990 he was named co-host of the weekly investigative newsmagazine the fifth estate, with which he remained until 2014. In addition, he has been a frequent guest host of The Current on CBC Radio One.

In 2014, MacIntyre decided to retire both to help spare at least one younger colleague from the pending 657 job cuts from the CBC and to illustrate the effect of the considerable budget cuts the CBC is enduring.

=== Stories ===
For the fifth estate, he has written numerous investigative reports often with producer Neil Docherty. Many of the shows have also appeared on Frontline. Examples of his stories include:

- "To Sell a War" (1992). The film is about a public relations campaign to gain public opinion support for the First Gulf War. It won an International Emmy and a Gemini Award.
- "The Trouble With Evan" (1994). This film, about the psychological abuse of a child by his parents, was introduced by MacIntyre when first broadcast as the saddest story he ever had to tell. Winner of an Anik Award, it was removed from competition at the Cannes Film Festival and banned in Canada for several years due to court orders on behalf of some of the subjects.
- "His Word Against History: The Stephen Truscott Story" (2000). It was a co-recipient (with other fifth estate documentaries) of the Michener Award for meritorious public service journalism.
- "The Scandal of the Century" (2001) about false accusations of sexual abuse in Saskatchewan (see Sheila Steele).
- "Terror and Tehran" (2002) about US policy in Iran. Transcript of an online discussion about the program from The Washington Post)
- "Toxic Company" (with Frontline and New York Times Television, 2003). An exposé of McWane, it won a Dupont/Columbia Silver Baton, the George Polk Award, the George Foster Peabody Award and the CBC's Wilderness award. The accompanying New York Times series, "Dangerous Business", won a Pulitzer Prize.
- "A Hail of Bullets" (2005) about the Mayerthorpe tragedy.
- "Brian Mulroney: The Unauthorized Chapter" (2007) about the Airbus affair.

== Personal life ==
During a fifty-day lockout by the CBC in 2005, MacIntyre penned a memoir called Causeway: A Passage from Innocence, which he dedicated to his mother. He has five children including CBC New Brunswick producer Darrow MacIntyre. He married broadcaster Carol Off in 2000.

== Publications ==
=== Novels ===
Linden MacIntyre talks about The Bishop's Man on Bookbits radio.

His first three novels are called his Cape Breton Trilogy:

- The Long Stretch, 1999
- The Bishop's Man, 2009 - Winner of the 2009 Scotiabank Giller Prize - Winner of the 2010 Libris Fiction Book of the Year Award.
- Why Men Lie, 2012
- Punishment, 2014
- The Only Café, 2017
- The Winter Wives, 2021

=== Non-fiction ===
- Who Killed Ty Conn (with Theresa Burke), 2001
- Causeway: A Passage from Innocence, 2006
- The Wake: The Deadly Legacy of a Newfoundland Tsunami, 2019
