= Bishop of Tanis =

The bishop of Tanis was the head of the Christian church in the ancient Egyptian city of Tanis (today Ṣān al-Ḥagar). Although it is no longer a residential bishopric, it has been a titular bishopric in the Roman Catholic Church since the Middle Ages.

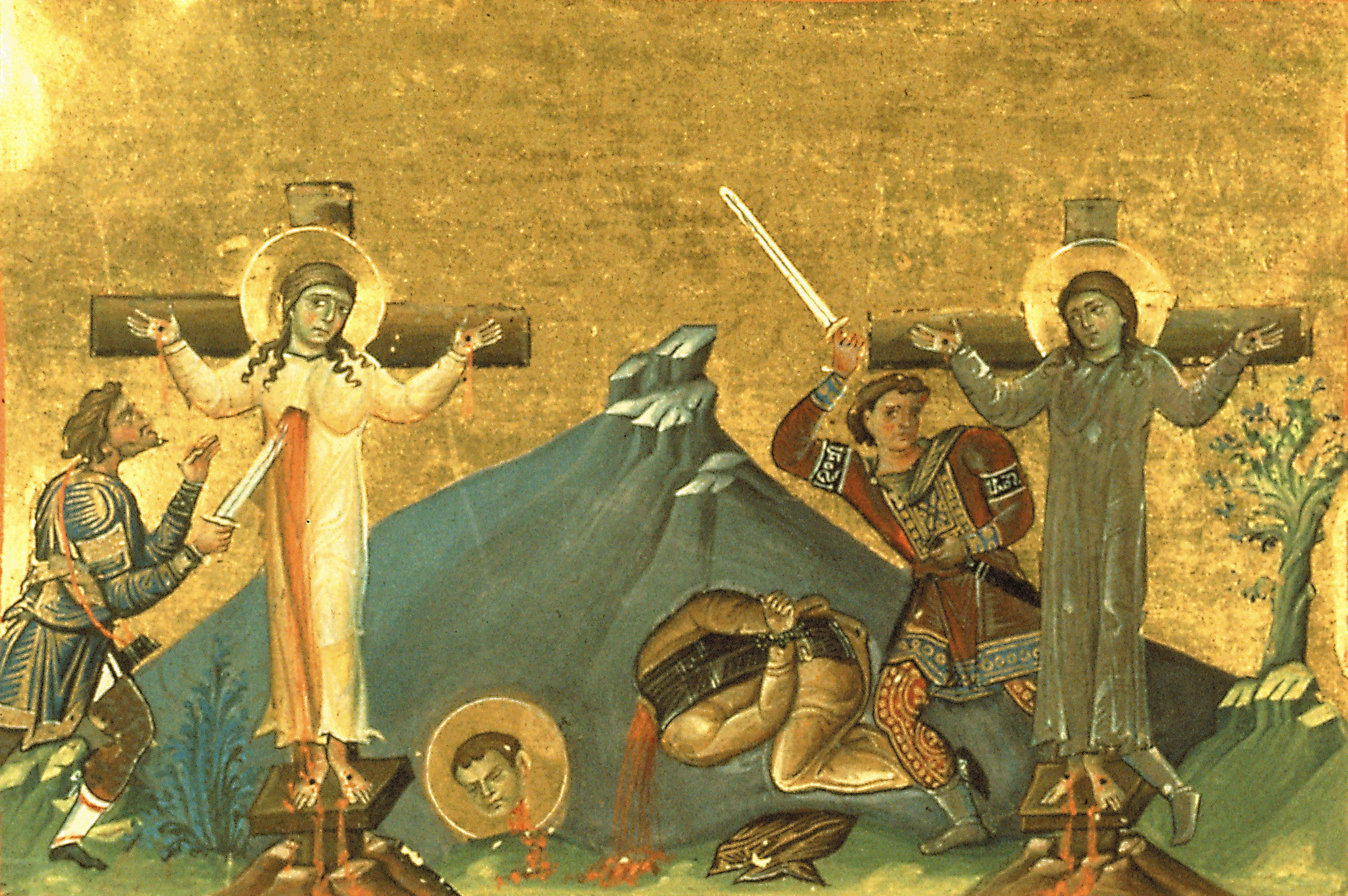
According to the Latin martyrologies, the sibling saints Mary, Martha and Lycarion were martyred at Tanis. This tradition, however, is unreliable. Image from the Menologion of Basil II.

Tanis declined in importance relative to its seaport of Tinnis. In the fifth century, many of the environs of Tanis had been lost to the sea. After the Arab conquest of Egypt, the Islamic geographers still considered it one of the most fertile places in Egypt with a pleasant climate. The city was ultimately abandoned, the inhabitants even moving their dead to Tinnis, which itself was abandoned in 1192.

Tanis was a suffragan diocese of the metropolitan province of Pelusium, which corresponded to the Roman province of Augustamnica Prima. In 1220, however, the Catholic bishop James of Vitry on the Fifth Crusade recorded that Tanis was a diocese in the metropolitan province of Damietta.

At the time of the Council of Nicaea in 325, the bishop of Tanis was a Melitian named Eudaemon. He is mentioned in letters of Bishop Melitius of Lycopolis and Patriarch Athanasius of Alexandria. In a letter written fourteen years later in 339, Athanasius indicates that the reigning bishop was a certain Theodore, who had succeeded Elias. In 362, the bishop was Hermion (Hermaeon).

At the Council of Ephesus of 449 and the Council of Chalcedon of 451, the attending bishop of Tanis was Apollonius. A Miaphysite, he spoke up in defence of Eutyches and against Eusebius of Dorylaeum and Flavian of Constantinople at Ephesus. He was signatory to the acts of Ephesus that were overturned at Chalcedon. At Chalcedon he was one of the thirteen Egyptian bishops (out of twenty) who presented a petition defending their orthodoxy to the emperors Marcian and Valentinian III. It was read out before the council during the fourth session.

By 458 the bishop of Tanis was a certain Paul. A further eight bishops of the Coptic Orthodox Church are known by name down to the end of the eleventh century, according to the 18th-century historian Michel Le Quien: Mark, Isaac (fl. 831), Demetrius, Mennas, Simon (fl. 1047), Michael (fl. 1049) and Samuel (fl. 1086). In 870, according to the first-hand account of the Frankish pilgrim Bernard, there were still many Christians in Tanis and they were burning with excessive hospitality. In 1051, Bishop Michael wrote a continuation of the History of the Patriarchs of Alexandria covering the patriarchs from Michael III to Shenoute II. His was perhaps the last section to have been written originally in Coptic.

== See also ==
- Roman Catholic Archdiocese of Halifax-Yarmouth
