= Raymond Lahey =

Canadian priest and bishop

- Diocese: Antigonish
- Installed: 5 April 2003
- Term ended: 26 September 2009
- Predecessor: Colin Campbell
- Successor: Brian Dunn

Orders
- Ordination: 13 June 1963
- Consecration: 3 August 1986
- Laicized: 2012

Personal details
- Born: 29 May 1940 St. John's, Newfoundland
- Died: 10 April 2022 (aged 81) Montreal, Quebec, Canada
- Denomination: Roman Catholic
- Residence: Antigonish, Nova Scotia
- Occupation: former member of clergy

Raymond John Lahey (29 May 1940 – 10 April 2022) was a Canadian bishop of the Catholic Church. He was Bishop of the Diocese of Antigonish, Nova Scotia from 2003 to 2009. Lahey was charged in 2009 with the importation of child pornography. He was suspended from the exercise of his priestly and sacramental functions, resigned as bishop in 2009, and was laicized by Pope Benedict XVI in 2012.

== Education ==
Lahey was born in St. John's, Newfoundland, on 29 May 1940. He attended St. Paul University at the University of Ottawa, where he graduated with a Bachelor of Theology in 1961, a Licentiate in Theology (L.Th.) in 1963 and Doctor of Philosophy (Ph.D.) (magna cum laude) in 1966.

He was ordained on 13 June 1963.

== Career ==
Lahey served in both clerical and academic positions first in Newfoundland and Labrador, and later in Nova Scotia. Evidence later emerged that the principal offender, Bishop Lahey, may have assumed the role of a fixer during the 1989 sexual abuse scandal in St. John's archdiocese in Newfoundland when he served under then-archbishop Alphonsus Liguori Penney.

- Administrator of Holy Cross Parish, Diocese of Grand Falls, Holyrood
- Pastor of St. Peter's Parish, Archdiocese of St. John's, Mount Pearl
- Vicar General of the Archdiocese of St. John's, St. John's
- Assistant Professor, Department of Religious Studies, Memorial University of Newfoundland, St. John's
- Proctor of St. John's College, Memorial University of Newfoundland, St. John's
- Associate Professor, Department of Religious Studies, Memorial University of Newfoundland, St. John's
- Department Head, Department of Religious Studies, Memorial University of Newfoundland, St. John's
- Member of the Senate of Memorial University, Memorial University of Newfoundland, St. John's
- Member of the Provincial Religious Education Committee, Newfoundland and Labrador
- Served on two Roman Catholic school boards, Newfoundland and Labrador
- Served on the Belvedere Orphanage Trust, Newfoundland and Labrador
- Vice-Chairman of the Roman Catholic 200th Anniversary Committee, Newfoundland and Labrador (included preparations for the 1984 Papal Visit by Pope John Paul II to the province)

=== Bishop ===
- Named Bishop of the Diocese of St. George's on 8 July 1986 by Pope John Paul II. Consecrated on 3 August 1986 in Corner Brook.
- Named Bishop of Antigonish by John Paul on 5 April 2003. Installed there on 12 June 2003.
- Pope Benedict XVI accepted his resignation on 26 September 2009, after child pornography was discovered on his laptop.

== Academic contributions ==
- author of studies and articles on theology and church history
- contributor to the Dictionary of Canadian Biography
- member of several scholarly boards, including the American Academy of Religion

== Abuse scandal ==
In 1989, Fr. Kevin Molloy went to former St. John's archbishop Alphonsus Liguori Penney to report that a child had seen pornography at the home of Lahey. These allegations were recounted in 2009 when Bishop Lahey was subsequently arrested for separate allegations involving illicit pornography.

On 7 August 2009, Lahey announced that the Diocese of Antigonish had reached a $15 million settlement in a class action lawsuit filed by victims of sexual abuse by diocese priests dating to 1950. The settlement was approved by the Supreme Court of Nova Scotia on 10 September 2009. In 2012 the diocese satisfied its legal obligations to pay out $15 million to the victims of sexual abuse, after selling a large number of its properties, liquidating the bank accounts of many of its churches, and borrowing $6.5 million from private lenders.

== Criminal charges and laicization ==
On 15 September 2009, then Bishop Lahey returned to Canada from London with a passport bearing visas from Thailand and other Asian countries. At Ottawa Macdonald–Cartier International Airport, Canada Border Services Agency officers performed a random search of Lahey's laptop computer and allegedly uncovered "images . . . that were of concern." Lahey was allowed to continue his journey home to Nova Scotia, but the computer was seized. The Ottawa Police Service alleged that a later forensic examination revealed child pornography.

Lahey pleaded guilty to a charge of "possession of child pornography for the purpose of importation" on 4 May 2011. He requested imprisonment, surrendering his right to bail. That same day, the Holy See acknowledged the plea and announced that it would continue its own process "which will result in the imposition of the appropriate disciplinary or penal measures". On 4 January 2012, he was sentenced to 15 months imprisonment and 24 months of probation. Under Canadian law, time spent in pre-trial detention was credited at a two-to-one rate against a criminal sentence. Lahey’s eight months in pre-trial detention counted as 16 months against his 15-month sentence, and he was discharged on the same day. (Note: The federal law that allowed judges to give 2-for-1 credit for time spent in pre-trial detention had been repealed in 2010, but applied in Lahey's case because the statute was still in effect when he was charged in 2009.)

On 16 May 2012, the Canadian Conference of Catholic Bishops announced that Lahey had been laicized.

== Notes ==
Catholic Church titles
Preceded by Richard Thomas McGrath	Bishop of St. George's; 8 July 1986 – 5 April 2003	Succeeded by David Douglas Crosby
Preceded by Colin Campbell	Bishop of Antigonish; 5 April 2003 – 26 September 2009	Succeeded by Brian Dunn
