= Roman Catholic Diocese of Yarmouth =

Catholic ecclesiastical territory

Diocese of Yarmouth

Location
- Territory: Southwestern Nova Scotia
- Ecclesiastical province: Nova Scotia
- Metropolitan: Yarmouth, Nova Scotia

Statistics
- Area: 32,150 km^{2} (12,410 sq mi)
- Population: Total; Catholics: (as of 2004); 143,261; 36,000 (25.1%)

Information
- Denomination: Roman Catholic
- Rite: Roman Rite
- Established: July 6, 1953
- Cathedral: Saint Ambrose Cathedral

Current leadership
- Pope: Leo XIV
- Metropolitan Archbishop: Archbishop of Halifax

Website
- catholic-hierarchy.org/diocese/dyarm.html

The Roman Catholic Diocese of Yarmouth (Latin: Dioecesis Yarmuthensis) was a Roman Catholic diocese that includes part of the Province of Nova Scotia. It was erected on July 6, 1953. The Diocese of Yarmouth covered 32,150 square kilometers. In December 2011, it was merged with the Archdiocese of Halifax to create the Archdiocese of Halifax-Yarmouth.

== Diocesan bishops ==
The following is a list of the bishops of Yarmouth, and their terms of service:

- Albert Leménager (1953-1967)
- Austin-Emile Burke (1968-1991)
- James Matthew Wingle (1993-2001)
