= John Dalton (bishop) =

The Right Reverend John Dalton, O.F.M. Rec.
- Bishop of Harbour Grace, Newfoundland
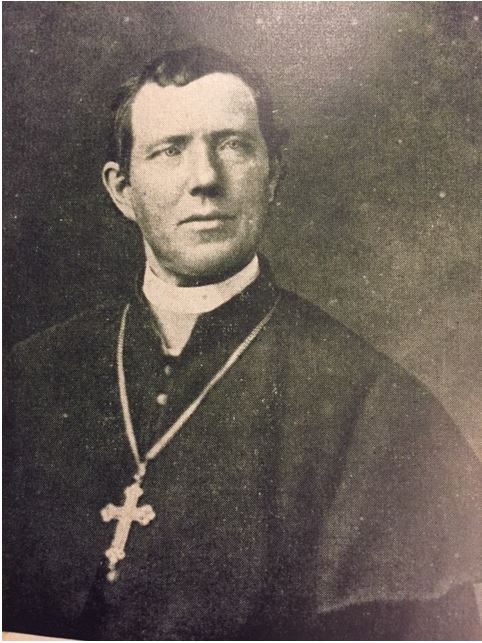
- Archdiocese: St. John's Newfoundland
- Diocese: Harbour Grace
- Installed: February 29, 1856
- Term ended: May 5, 1869
- Successor: Enrico Carfagnini, O.S.F.

Orders
- Ordination: 1849
- Consecration: May 25, 1856 by John Thomas Mullock, O.S.F.

Personal details
- Born: c. 1821 Thurles, County Tipperary, United Kingdom of Great Britain and Ireland
- Died: May 5, 1869 Harbour Grace, Newfoundland, Canada
- Buried: Cathedral of the Immaculate Conception, Harbour Grace, Newfoundland and Labrador, Canada (1869 - 2018), Harbour Grace Roman Catholic Cemetery (2018)
- Denomination: Roman Catholic

John Dalton, O.F.M. Rec., (c. 1821 – May 5, 1869) was an Irish-born Friar Minor who served as the first Roman Catholic Bishop of Harbour Grace, Newfoundland, from 1856 to 1869.

== Life ==
Dalton was born in Thurles, County Tipperary, in 1821. In 1839 he left Ireland for Newfoundland, where his uncle, Charles Dalton, O.S.F., a Friar Minor, was serving as the parish priest of Immaculate Conception Parish in Harbour Grace. The following year, John also entered the Franciscan Order and was sent to study at St. Isidore’s College in Rome, the seminary of the Irish friars of the Order. He was ordained a Catholic priest there in 1846.

Dalton returned to Newfoundland that same year. He was then assigned as a curate by Michael Anthony Fleming, O.S.F., the Vicar Apostolic of Newfoundland, to assist his uncle by caring for the congregation of St. Patrick's Parish in Carbonear. When Charles Dalton was later transferred to Harbour Grace, John became parish priest in Carbonear.

In early 1856, the Diocese of St. John's, Newfoundland, was divided by the Holy See to form the new Diocese of Harbour Grace, and Dalton was appointed by Pope Pius IX on February 29 as its first bishop. He was ordained a bishop on May 25 of that year by John Thomas Mullock, O.F.M.. the Bishop of St. John's.

For the first few years Dalton continued to live at Carbonear but, following the death of his uncle, he moved in 1860 to the rectory at Harbour Grace. He spent the rest of his administration working to establish the structures of the diocese, including commencement of the construction of a cathedral for his diocese. He was also active in the local politics of the province. One of his first acts as bishop had been to ordain a native of Newfoundland as a priest.

Dalton died in his post in 1869. His remains are interred under the main altar of the present cathedral, built in 1892, which is currently inactive. In August 2018, Bishop Dalton, along with the Donnelly family were exhumed from the crypt and buried in the Harbour Grace Roman Catholic Cemetery. This was due to the cathedral being sold.
