= St. Patrick's Church (Carbonear) =

Catholic church in Carbonear, Newfoundland, Canada

Coordinates: 47.7390°N 53.2330°W

St. Patrick's Roman Catholic Church
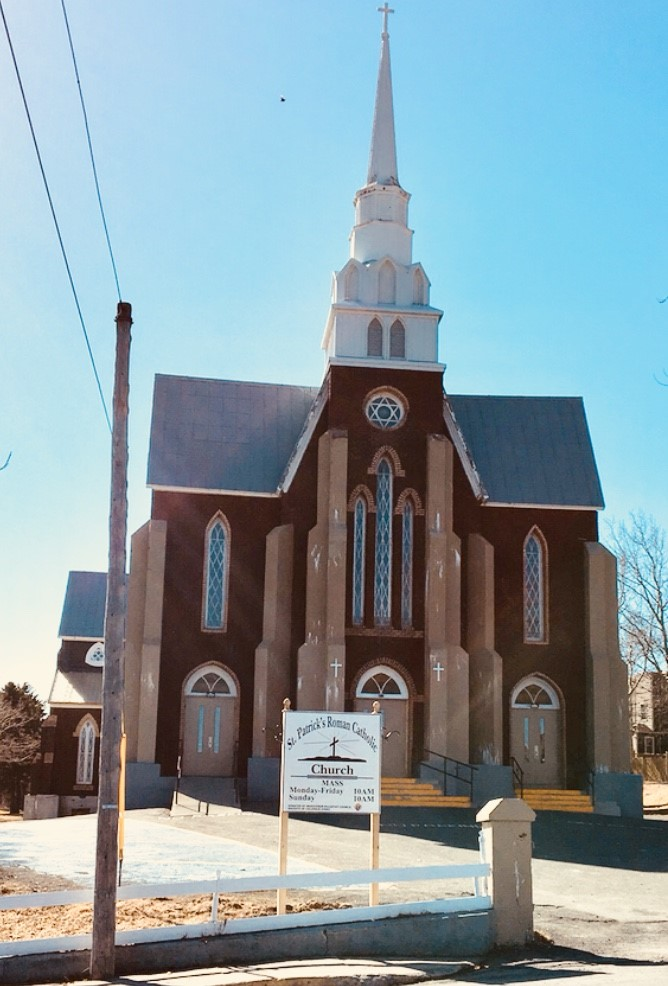

Religion
- Affiliation: Roman Catholic
- Diocese: Roman Catholic Diocese of Grand Falls
- Ecclesiastical or organizational status: Church
- Leadership: Rev. Anthony Nwoko

Location
- Location: 17 St. Clare Avenue, Carbonear Newfoundland, Canada
- Interactive map of St. Patrick's Roman Catholic Church

Architecture
- Style: Gothic Revival
- Completed: 1891

Specifications
- Direction of façade: East
- Length: 144 Ft
- Spire height: 115 Ft

St. Patrick's Roman Catholic Church is a Catholic church in Carbonear, Newfoundland. The present brick church was completed in 1891. It and the Church of the Sacred Heart in Heart's Desire constitute the Parish of St. Patrick within the Diocese of Grand Falls.

== Parish Priests ==
- Rev. John Dalton, P.P. (1850 - 1856) (died 1869)
- Rev. John O'Connor, P.P. (1856 - 1873) (died 1898)
- Rev. William Veitch, P.P. (1873 - 1876) (died 1917)
- Rev. Stephen O'Flynn, P.P. (1876 - 1879) (died 1899)
- Rev. Richard F. Walsh, P.P. (1879 - 1884)
- Rev. Thomas.E. Lynch, P.P. (1884 - 1889)
- Rt. Rev. Msgr. Felix D. McCarthy, P.P., V.G., D.P., P.A. (1889 - 1944) (died 1944)
- Rev. Thomas D. O'Neill, P.P. (1944 - 1948) (died 1956)
- Rt. Rev. Msgr. Joseph W. Peddle, P.P. (1948 - 1953)
- Rev. Leo Burke, P.P. (1953 - 1957) (died 2004)
- Rt. Rev. Msgr. Joseph W. Peddle, P.P., V.G. (1957 - 1974) (died 1974)
- Rev. William P. Hogan, P.P. (1974 - 1981) (died 1999)
- Rev. David W. Heale, P.P. (1981 -1985) (died 2008)
- Rev. Brendan J. McCarthy, P.P. (1985 - 1991) (died 2010)
- Rev. William Matthews, P.P. (1991 - 2001) (died 2015)
- Rev. William Hearn, P.P. (2001 - 2002)
- Rt. Rev. Msgr. Edward T. Bromley, V.G., P.P. (2002 - 2012) (died 2016)
- Rev. Michael Barker, P.P. (2012 - 2016)
- Rev. Anthony Nwoko, S.D.V. (2016–Present)

== History Timeline ==
- 1826 - First wooden Catholic Church is built in Carbonear.
- 1835 - A second Catholic Church is erected in Carbonear.
- 1888 - On September 14, a "Very impressive ceremony took place at Carbonear", namely laying the foundation of the new St. Patrick's.
- 1889 - Rev. F. D. McCarthy was assigned to St. Patrick's in Carbonear and oversaw the construction of the present brick church.
- 1891 - At 11 o'clock pm on Thursday December 24, 1891 the church opened its doors and celebrated its first mass.
- 1895 - The second church was converted into a convent.
- 1991 - 100th anniversary of the brick church.
- 1999 - A new spire was erected for the church.
- 2017 - St. Patrick's Parish celebrated 150 years.
- 2020 - On January 4, a fire broke out in the church furnace building. Smoke leaked into the church and the furnace was destroyed, causing the church to shut down. Mass was held at the local Knights of Columbus building; the church has since re-opened.
