= Timothy Carroll =

Timothy Carroll may refer to:

- Timothy Carroll (athlete) (1888–1955), Irish track and field athlete
- Timothy Carroll (bishop) (born 1940), Irish-born Roman Catholic bishop
- Timothy Carroll, lead vocalist and guitarist for Australian indie rock band Holy Holy

== See also ==
- Tim Carroll (born 1951), Canadian politician and educator
