= Robert Anthony Daniels =

Canadian prelate

- Bishop of Grand Falls
- Church: Catholic Church
- Diocese: Diocese of Grand Falls
- Appointed: 1 March 2011
- Predecessor: Martin William Currie
- Previous posts: Titular Bishop of Scebatiana (2004-2011); Auxiliary Bishop of London, Ontario (2004-2011)

Orders
- Ordination: 7 May 1983 by John Michael Sherlock
- Consecration: 9 November 2004 by Ronald Peter Fabbro

Personal details
- Born: 18 June 1957 (age 68) Windsor, Ontario, Dominion of Canada, British Empire

Styles of Robert Anthony Daniels
- Reference style: His Excellency
- Spoken style: Your Excellency
- Religious style: Bishop, Most Reverend
- Posthumous style: N/A

Robert Anthony Daniels (born 18 June 1957), sometimes styled R. Anthony Daniels or Anthony Daniels, is a Canadian prelate of the Roman Catholic Church. He is the 9th bishop of the Roman Catholic Diocese of Grand Falls, Newfoundland, Canada, succeeding Archbishop Martin Currie, 67, who had been the bishop of the diocese in addition to being archbishop of his own archdiocese, the Metropolitan Archdiocese of St. John's, Newfoundland.

== Biography ==
=== Early life ===
Daniels was born on 18 June 1957, in Windsor, Ontario. He was educated early on at St. Mary Goretti Elementary School, followed by St. Louis Senior and F.J. Brennan High School.

=== Career ===
Daniels attended St. Peter's Seminary where he received a master of divinity degree from the University of Western Ontario.

- 7 May 1983 – Ordained to the priesthood in the Diocese of London
- Appointed Assistant Priest – St. John the Divine, London, 1983
- Appointed Assistant Priest – St. Peter's Cathedral, 1986
- Appointed Chancellor, Diocese of London, 1989
- Appointed Vicar General, Diocese of London 1992
- 2001–2004 – served as pastor of St. Columban RC Parish. St. Columban, Ontario (parish within the Diocese of London)
- 21 September 2004 – Appointed Auxiliary Bishop of London, Ontario, Canada
- 21 September 2004 – Appointed titular Bishop of Scebatiana
- 9 November 2004 – Consecrated titular Bishop of Scebatiana
- 1 March 2011 – Appointed Bishop of the Roman Catholic Diocese of Grand Falls, Newfoundland, Canada
- Installed 11 April 2011 as Bishop of Grand Falls

Until his appointment to that see by Pope Benedict XVI, on Tuesday, 1 March 2011, he had been Auxiliary Bishop of the Diocese of London, Ontario, Canada. While in his former post, he had been the titular bishop of Scebatiana. Bishop Daniels was consecrated bishop on Tuesday, 9 November 2004, at St. Peter’s Cathedral in London, Ontario. He was first appointed by the Pope John Paul II to be Auxiliary Bishop in the Diocese of London and Titular Bishop of Scebatiana. John Paul II had made this announcement on 21 September 2004.

== See also ==
- Roman Catholic Diocese of London, Ontario
- St. Peter’s Cathedral Basilica
- St. Peter's Seminary
- Roman Catholic Diocese of Grand Falls

Religious titles
Preceded by Martin William Currie	Bishop of Grand Falls, Newfoundland; 2011–Present	Succeeded by incumbent
Preceded by Richard John Grecco	Auxiliary Bishop of London; 2004–2011	Succeeded by vacant
Preceded by Carlito J. Cenzon	Titular Bishop of Scebatiana; 2004–2011	Succeeded by Bulus Dauwa Yohanna
