= Apostolic Prefecture of Placentia =

Catholic missionary jurisdiction

The Apostolic Prefecture of Placentia was a short-lived (1870–91) Catholic pre-diocesan jurisdiction in Newfoundland.

It was named after its see, Placentia, an amalgamated town on the Avalon Peninsula, Newfoundland and Labrador.

== History ==
- Established on 16 September 1870 as Apostolic Prefecture of Placentia / Placentia (Latin), on territories split off from the then Archdiocese of St. John's (which it was held in personal union with) and Diocese of Harbour Grace.
- Suppressed in 1891, its territory being reassigned to the above St. John's, Newfoundland, which it in effect merged (back) into.

== Ordinary ==
Its only episcopal leader was :

- Thomas James (born Ireland) (1870.05.09 – see suppressed 1891), also Bishop of St. John's, Newfoundland (1870.05.08 – death 1893.12.04).

== Sources and external links ==
- GCatholic - data for all sections
