= Michael Francis Howley =

Canadian archbishop

The Most Reverend Michael Francis Howley
- Archbishop of St. John's
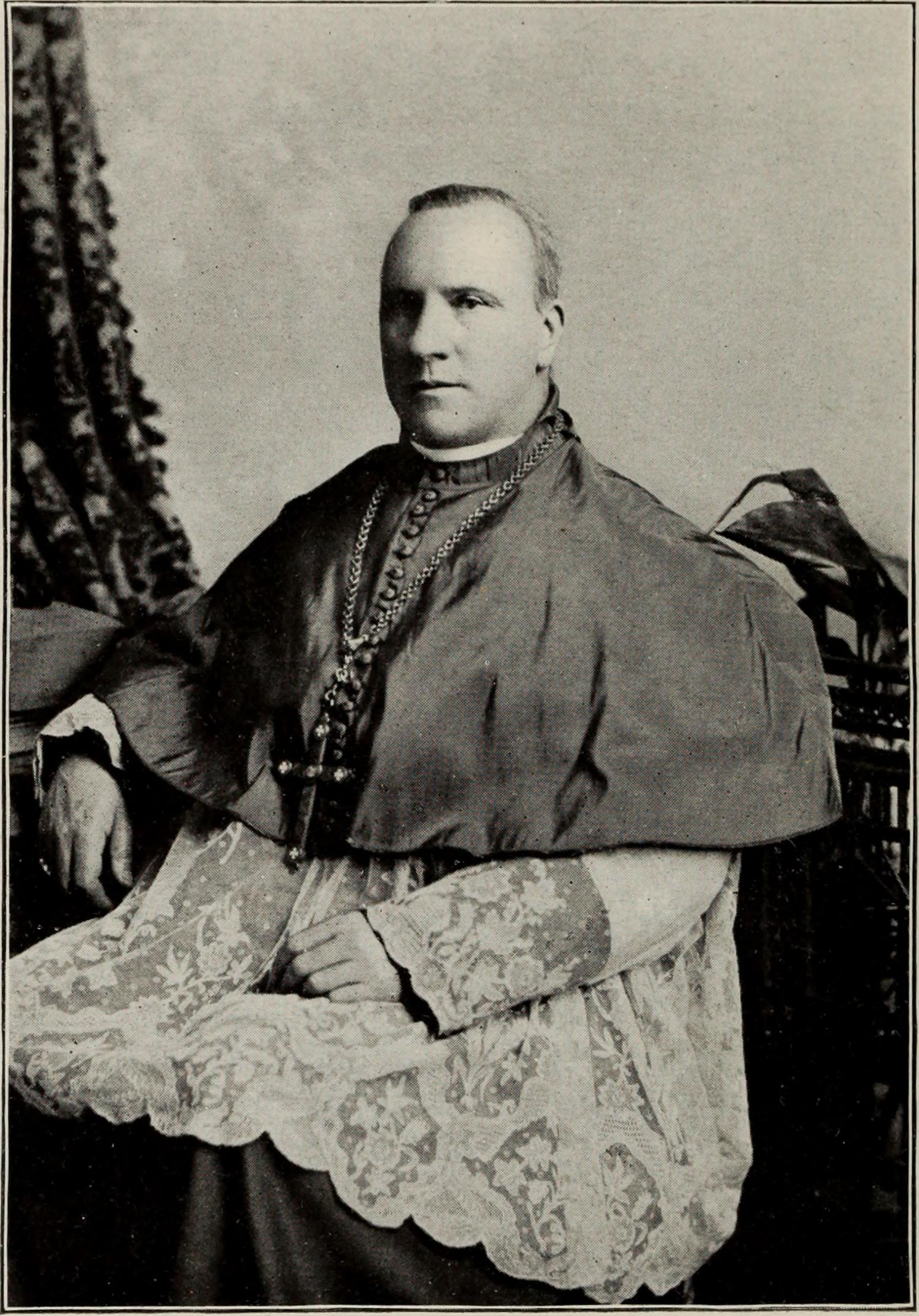
- Church: Catholic Church
- Archdiocese: St. John's
- Appointed: January 5, 1895
- Term ended: October 15, 1914
- Predecessor: Thomas Joseph Power
- Successor: Edward Patrick Roche
- Previous post: Vicar Apostolic of Western Newfoundland (1892–1895)

Orders
- Ordination: June 6, 1868 by Costantino Patrizi Naro
- Consecration: June 24, 1892 by Thomas Joseph Power

Personal details
- Born: September 25, 1843 St. John's, Newfoundland Colony
- Died: October 15, 1914 (aged 71) St. John's, Dominion of Newfoundland

Michael Francis Howley (September 25, 1843 – October 15, 1914) was a Newfoundlander prelate of the Catholic Church. He served as Vicar Apostolic of Western Newfoundland (1892–1895) before leading the Archdiocese of St. John's as its fourth bishop (1895–1904) and first archbishop (1904–1914).

== Early life and education ==
Michael Francis Howley was born on September 25, 1843, in St. John's, then part of the Newfoundland Colony, to Richard and Eliza (née Burke) Howley. His father was a native of County Tipperary, Ireland, and immigrated to St. John's in 1819. Michael was one of thirteen children, nine of whom survived to adulthood. One of his brothers was James Patrick Howley, a geologist and author. Another brother, Richard Vincent Howley, also entered the priesthood.

Howley's father became a prominent businessman and civil servant in St. John's, where he built a residence on Torbay Road known as Mount Cashel. In 1898, the family sold the property to the Congregation of Christian Brothers, who operated it as Mount Cashel Orphanage until 1990.

Howley received his early education at a Catholic school run by John Valentine Nugent, and enrolled at St. Bonaventure's College at age 13. In 1863, he went to Rome to study for the priesthood at the Pontificio Collegio Urbano de Propaganda Fide.

== Priesthood ==
Howley was ordained a priest on June 6, 1868, by Cardinal Costantino Patrizi Naro at the Lateran Basilica. He then served as secretary to Bishop Charles Eyre, the newly appointed Apostolic Delegate to Scotland. He accompanied Eyre to the First Vatican Council (1869–1870).

In 1870, Howley returned to Newfoundland with Bishop Thomas Joseph Power, who had been consecrated in Rome as Bishop of St. John's. He then served as an assistant at the Cathedral of St. John the Baptist, while spending summers serving the Catholics on the island's western coast. He served as pastor of Fortune Bay (1876–1879) before returning to the cathedral (1879–1885). Following the death of Father Thomas Sears, Howley was appointed to succeed him as Prefect Apostolic of Western Newfoundland on December 4, 1885.

== Episcopal career ==
=== Vicar Apostolic of Western Newfoundland ===
On April 29, 1892, Pope Leo XIII raised the apostolic prefecture of Western Newfoundland to the rank of an apostolic vicariate. Howley was named Vicar Apostolic, becoming the first Newfoundland-born Catholic priest to become a bishop. He was also given the honorary position of titular bishop of Amastris.

Howley received his episcopal consecration on June 24, 1892, from Bishop Power at the Cathedral of St. John the Baptist, with Bishops Ronald MacDonald and James Charles McDonald serving as co-consecrators.

=== Bishop and Archbishop of St. John's ===
Following the death of Bishop Power in December 1893, Howley was appointed by Leo XIII to succeed him as the fourth Bishop of St. John's on January 5, 1895. Pope Pius X later elevated the diocese to an archdiocese on February 8, 1904, with Howley becoming its first archbishop. He received the pallium on June 23, 1905.

Howley was active in the political affairs of Newfoundland. He opposed the 1898 railway contract that would give significant control of the local economy to Robert Gillespie Reid, and he also prohibited Catholics from joining the Fishermen's Protective Union.

== Death ==
Howley died on October 15, 1914, at age 71. He is buried in Belvedere Cemetery at St John's.
