= John March (bishop) =

Roman Catholic clergyman

- Bishop of Harbour Grace
- Church: Catholic Church
- Diocese: Diocese of Harbour Grace
- In office: 28 August 1906 – 12 January 1940
- Predecessor: Ronald MacDonald
- Successor: John Michael O'Neill

Orders
- Ordination: 16 March 1899
- Consecration: 4 November 1906 by Michael Francis Howley

Personal details
- Born: 14 July 1863 Northern Bay, Newfoundland Colony, British Empire
- Died: 12 January 1940 (aged 76)

John March (born 14 July 1863 in Northern Bay; died 12 January 1940) was a Canadian clergyman and prelate for the Roman Catholic Diocese of Harbour Grace. He was appointed bishop in 1906. He died in 1940.
