= Edward Roche =

Edward Roche may refer to:

- Édouard Roche (1820–1883), French astronomer and mathematician
- Edward Patrick Roche (1874–1950), Newfoundlander prelate of the Roman Catholic Church
- Edward Roche (politician) (1754–1821), American politician and Revolutionary War veteran
