= Mullaghanish =

Mountain in Ireland

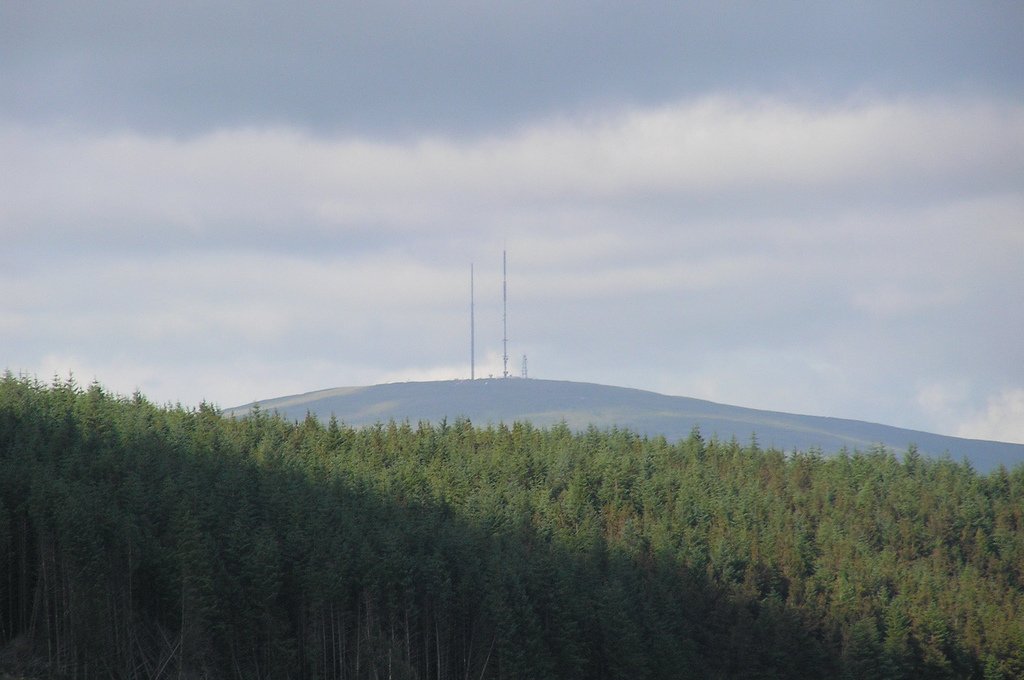
- Transmitter masts at Mullaghanish

Highest point
- Elevation: 649 m (2,129 ft)
- Prominence: 264 m (866 ft)
- Listing: Marilyn, Hewitt
- Coordinates: 51.983393°N 9.144209°W

Naming
- Native name: Mullach an Ois
- English translation: summit of the deer

Geography
- Location within island of Ireland
- Location: County Cork and County Kerry, Ireland
- Parent range: Derrynasaggart Mountains
- OSI/OSNI grid: W214817
- Topo map: OSi Discovery 79

Mullaghanish (/ˌmʌlɪɡənˈɪʃ/; Irish: Mullach an Ois) is a 649 m high mountain in the Derrynasaggart range, located just northeast of Ballyvourney in County Cork, Ireland.

== Transmission site ==
This site is home to one of Telefís Éireann's original five main television transmitters. Coming on air in December 1962, initially on low power, it was in full operation by September 1963 with a 625-line VHF service for the Southwest of Ireland, namely counties Cork, Kerry and Limerick. Today it is owned and operated by 2RN a subsidiary of RTÉ. In 2009 in preparation for the transmission of digital terrestrial television (DTT), a new mast was erected at Mullaghanish with a height of 225m, making it the tallest television transmitter in Ireland, the original 170m mast was subsequently removed. Analogue television transmissions from this site ended on 24 October 2012, and the national DTT service, Saorview, is now broadcast from Mullaghanish at an ERP of 200 kW, making this the most powerful television transmitter in all of Ireland, a distinction formerly attributed to the Cairn Hill (analogue) transmitter in County Longford.

As well as digital television, six national FM radio services are broadcast from the site, all using vertical polarisation. Local station, Radio Kerry, is broadcast from a directional antenna pointing west, into its target service area of County Kerry, and Newstalk is broadcast in mono.

The Mullaghanish transmitter has the highest number of relays (20) of any television transmitter in Ireland reflecting the difficult topography of its service area.

== Current transmissions ==
=== Digital television ===
Frequency	UHF	kW	Multiplex	Pol
474 MHz	21	200	Saorview 1	H
498 MHz	24	200	Saorview 2	H

=== FM radio ===
Frequency	kW	Service	Notes
90.0 MHz	160	RTÉ Radio 1	Since 1985
92.2 MHz	160	RTÉ 2FM	93.5 MHz Before 1985
94.4 MHz	160	RTÉ Raidió na Gaeltachta	91.3 MHz Before 1985 (Mono only before 1982)
97.0 MHz	20	Radio Kerry	Since 1990
99.6 MHz	160	RTÉ Lyric FM	Since 1999
101.8 MHz	160	Today FM	Since 1997
107.4 MHz	20	Newstalk	Since 2006 (Mono only)

=== Mullaghanish relay transmitters ===
DTT Relay	County	Mux 1	Mux 2	kW	Pol
Bandon	Cork	47	44	0.04	H
Bantry	Cork	33	36	2	V&H
Castletownbere	Cork	40	43	4	V
Clonakilty	Cork	48	46	0.05	H
Crosshaven	Cork	46	56	0.5	V
Dingle	Kerry	30	26	0.5	V
Drimoleague	Cork	42	49	0.05	V
Dungarvan	Waterford	32	34	10	H
Fermoy	Cork	33	36	0.05	V
Ferrypoint	Waterford	40	43	0.05	V
Glanmire	Cork	47	44	0.2	H
Kilkeaveragh	Kerry	47	44	8	V
Kinsale	Cork	30	26	0.03	V
Knockmoyle	Kerry	33	36	1	V
Leap	Cork	46	48	0.02	H
Maamclassach	Kerry	46	51	0.2	V
Mitchelstown	Limerick	40	43	0.5	V
Mt. Gabriel	Cork	37	31	0.5	V&H
Rosscarbery	Cork	32	34	0.05	H
Timoleague	Cork	26	29	0.01	V

== Gallery ==
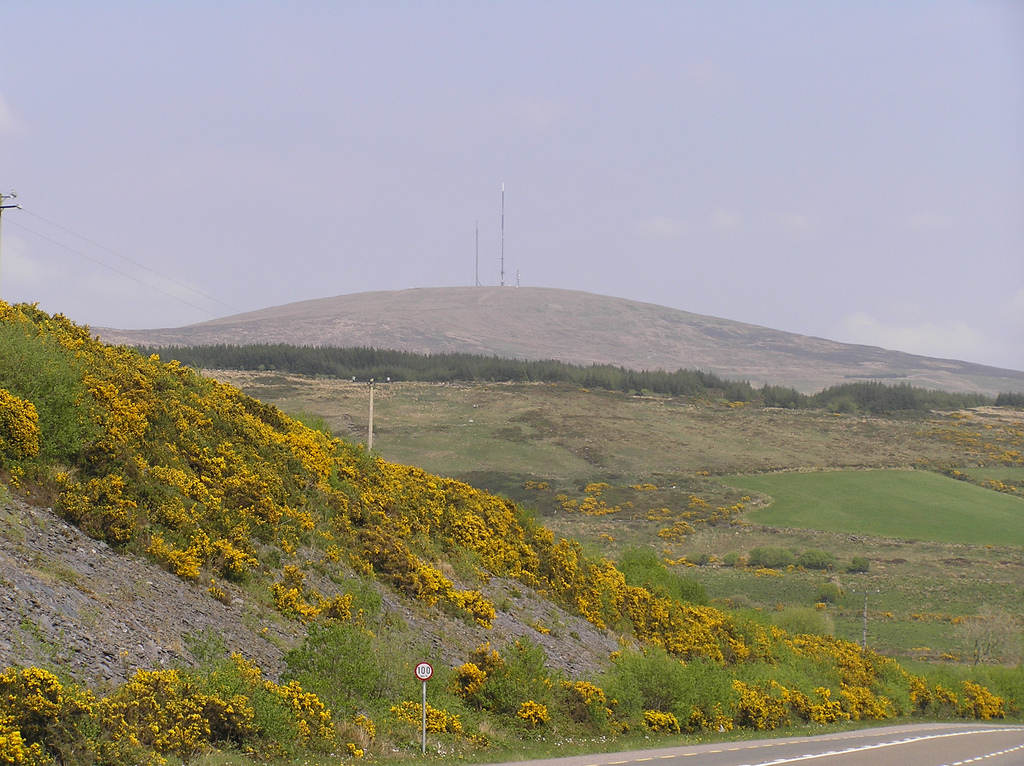
Mullaghanish as taken from the N22 road on the Cork/Kerry county bounds.

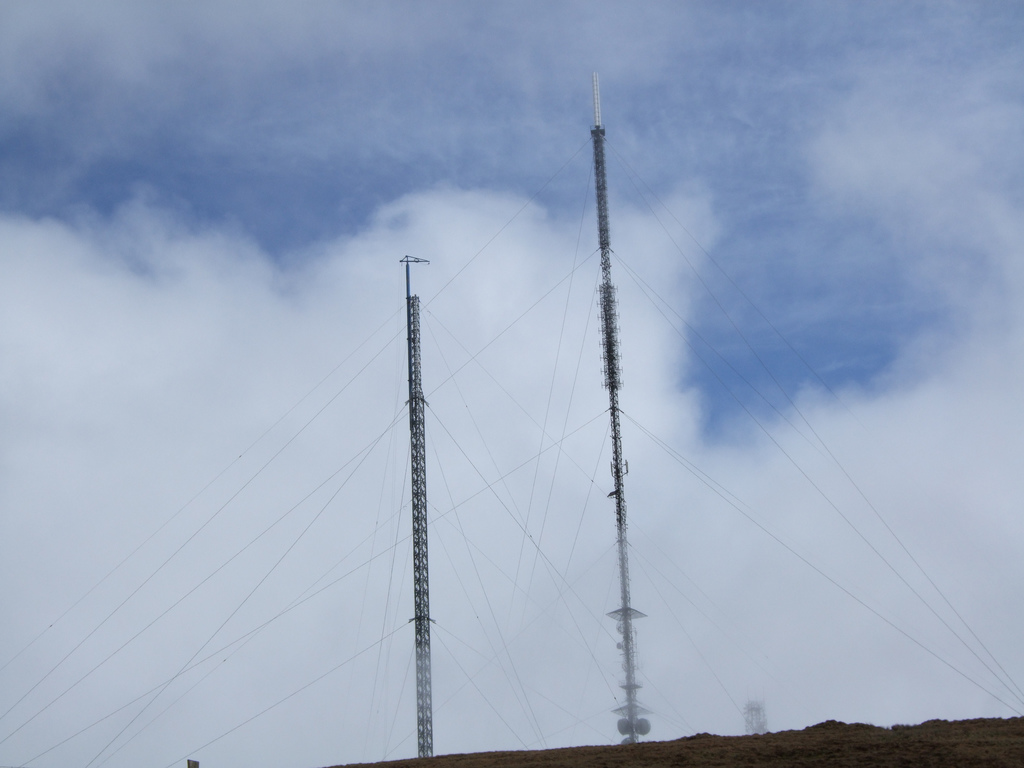
Old and new masts

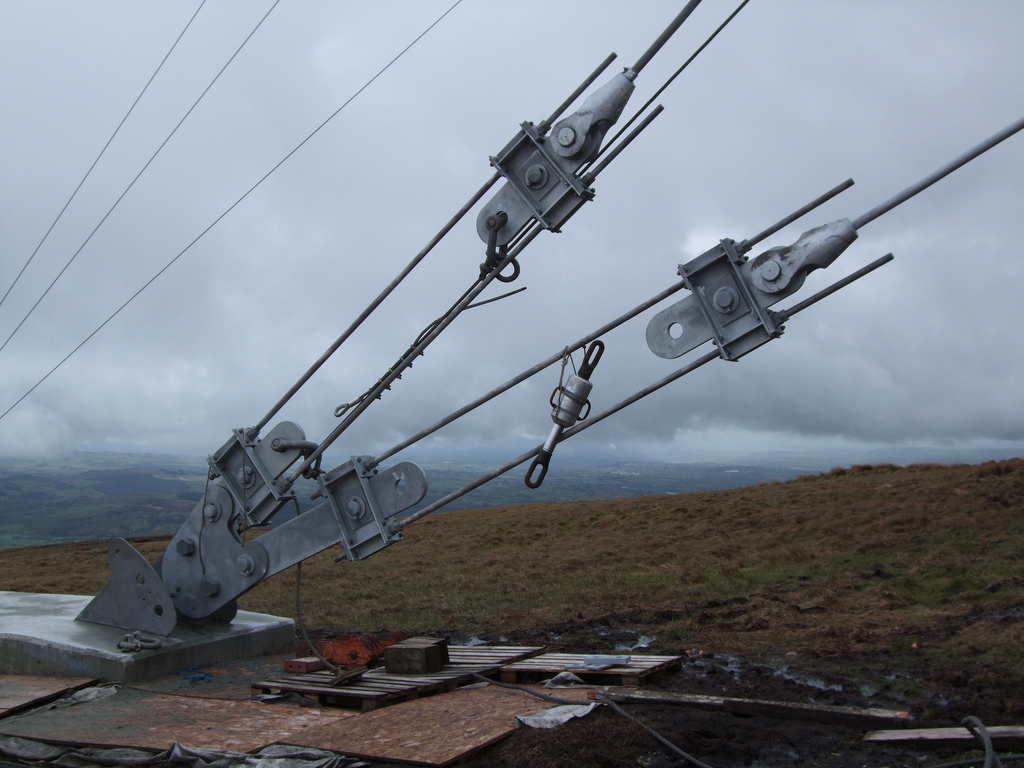
Cable tie down for stabilizing the mast

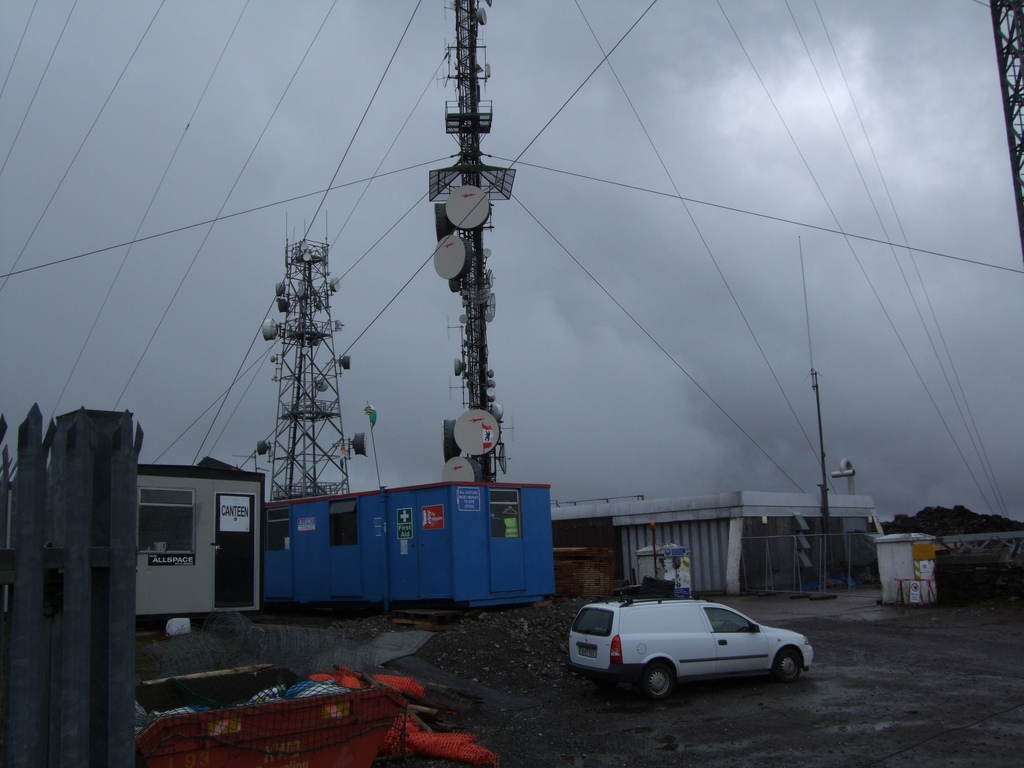
Base of Mast with Antennas and Comms Tower.
