= Claragh Mountain =

Mountain in Cork, Ireland

- Clara Mountain
- Clara from the townside

Highest point
- Elevation: 452 m (1,483 ft)
- Listing: Hewitt, Marilyn
- Coordinates: 52°02′51″N 9°05′37″W

Naming
- Language of name: Irish

Geography
- Location within Ireland
- Location: County Cork, Ireland
- Parent range: Derrynasaggart Mountains
- OSI/OSNI grid: W328850

Claragh Mountain or Clara Mountain (Irish:Sléibhe na Clárach) is a 452 metres (1,483 ft) mountain in Millstreet, north-west Cork in Ireland. It is part of the Derrynasaggart Mountain range which spreads across the Cork-Kerry border.

== Location and trail ==
The foot of the mountain is located 1 km west of Millstreet, the mountain overlooks the town with its cross near the summit. The mountain is very popular to climb and also has a walking trail around the mountain called the Claragh Loop.

== Gallery ==
Clara mountain on a snowy day

Clara from the reverse side
