= Ronald MacDonald (bishop) =

Canadian priest and educator

- Bishop of Harbour Grace, Newfoundland; Titular Archbishop of Gortyna
- Diocese: Harbour Grace
- Installed: May 24, 1881
- Term ended: September 3, 1906
- Predecessor: Enrico Carfagnini
- Successor: John March

Orders
- Ordination: October 2, 1859

Personal details
- Born: June 2, 1835 Malignant Brook (Maryvale), Nova Scotia
- Died: September 16, 1912 (aged 77) Montreal, Quebec

Ronald MacDonald (June 2, 1835 – September 16, 1912) was a Canadian Roman Catholic priest, educator, and Bishop of Harbour Grace, Newfoundland from 1881 to 1906. In 1906, he was appointed Titular Archbishop of Gortyna.
