= John Michael O'Neill =

Canadian clergyman (1903–1974)

- Bishop of Grand Falls
- Church: Catholic Church
- Diocese: Diocese of Grand Falls
- In office: 8 June 1940 – 23 November 1972
- Predecessor: John March
- Successor: Alphonsus Liguori Penney

Orders
- Ordination: 24 April 1927
- Consecration: 7 June 1940 by Ildebrando Antoniutti

Personal details
- Born: 26 October 1903 Harbour Grace, Newfoundland Colony, British Empire
- Died: 2 March 1974 (aged 70)

John Michael O'Neill (born 26 October 1903 in Harbour Grace; died 2 March 1974) was a Canadian clergyman and prelate for the Roman Catholic Diocese of Grand Falls. He was appointed bishop in 1940. He died in 1974.
