= Derrynasaggart Mountains =

Low mountain range in Counties Cork and Kerry, Ireland

- Irish: Sliabh Doire na Sagart
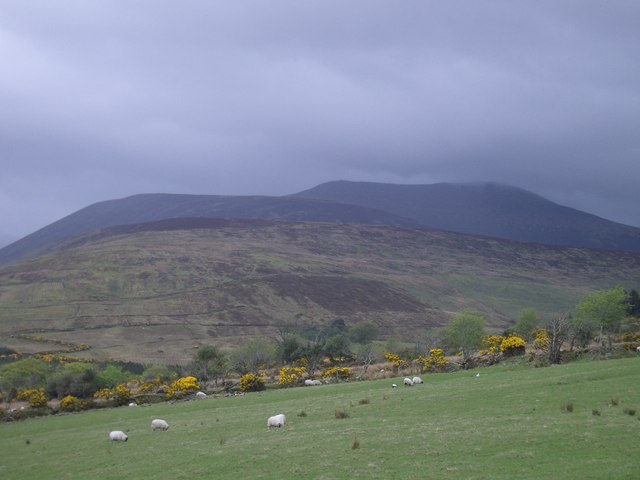

Highest point
- Peak: Paps of Anu
- Elevation: 694 m (2,277 ft)
- Coordinates: 51°59′N 9°14′W

Geography
- Country: Ireland
- Provinces of Ireland: Munster

The Derrynasaggart Mountains, also spelled as Derry Na Saggart (Irish: Cnoic Dhoire na Sagart, "hills of the priests' oak-grove") are on the border of counties Cork and Kerry, in the province of Munster, Ireland. They surround the Clydagh River valley. The highest peaks are the Paps of Anu at 694 metres (2,277 ft) above sea level, followed by Caherbarnagh (681 m), and Mullaghanish (649 m). Other mountains and hills include Knocknabro (592 m), Claragh Mountain (452 m) and Knockbwee (461 m). Surrounding villages are Ballyvourney, Millstreet and Rathmore.
