= Millstreet =

Town in County Cork, Ireland

Millstreet Sráid an Mhuilinn (Irish)
- Town
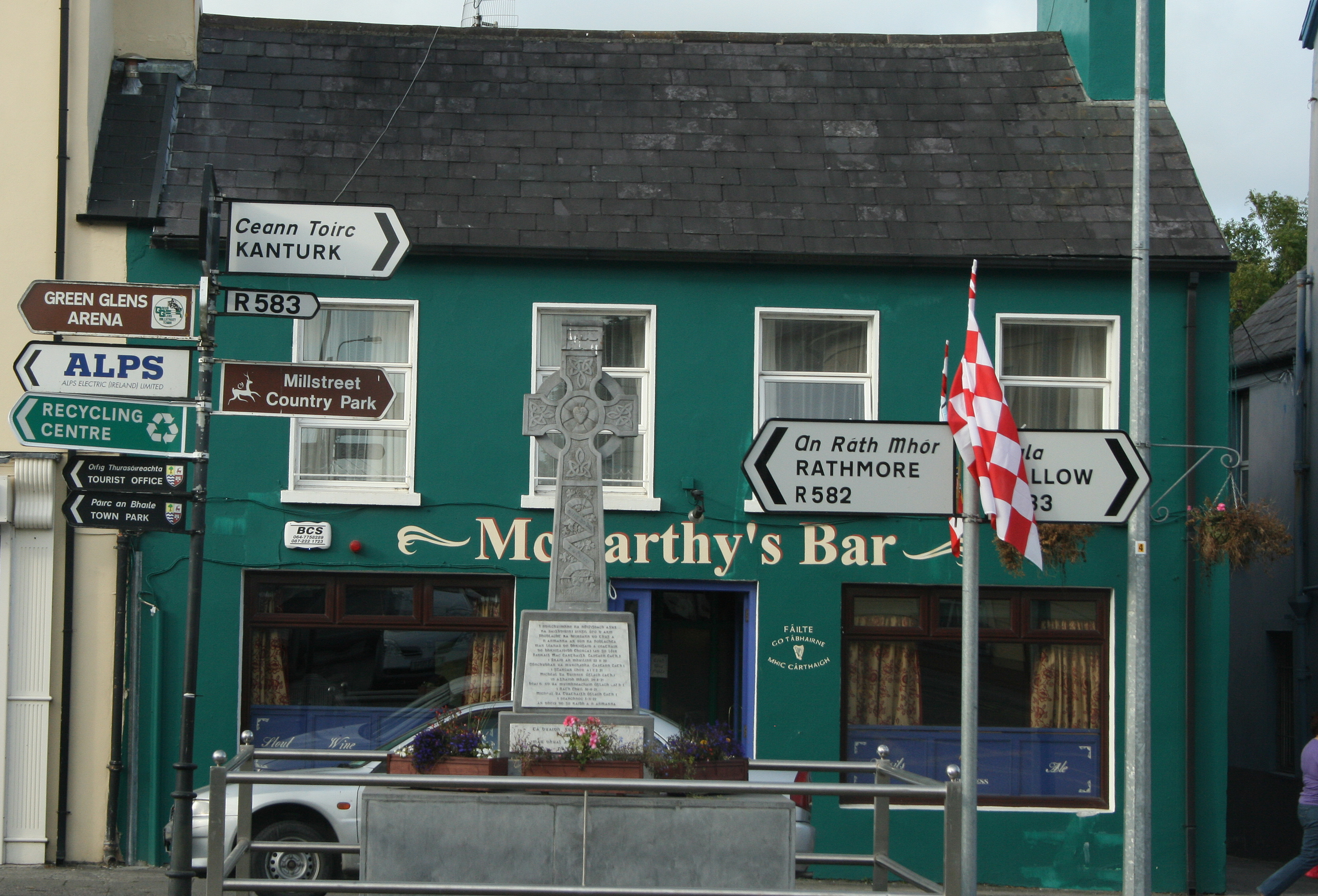
- Millstreet's National Monument, on front of McCarthy's Bar, in the town's main square

- Location in Ireland
- Coordinates: 52°03′37″N 9°03′51″W
- Country: Ireland
- Province: Munster
- County: Cork
- Council: Cork County Council
- Dáil constituency: Cork North-West
- European Parliament: South

Population (2022)
  - Total: 1,722
- Time zone: UTC+0 (WET)
  - Summer (DST): UTC+1 (IST (WEST))
- Website: www.millstreet.ie

Millstreet (Irish: Sráid an Mhuilinn) is a town in north County Cork, Ireland. As of the 2022 census, it had a population of 1,722.

Millstreet is within the civil parish of Drishane, and within a Poor Law Union also called Millstreet. The Millstreet Union encompasses the civil parishes of Drishane and Kilcorney.

== Geography ==
The town is at the foot of Clara Mountain, part of the Derrynasaggart range.

The townlands within Millstreet Poor Law Union were part of the barony of West Muskerry. Aubane was an area within Millstreet Poor Law Union, in the townlands of Tooreenbane and Tullig, and is outside the town itself.

== History ==
Evidence of ancient settlement within the town include a ringfort and souterrain site within Coomlogane townland. A number of lintel stones, with Ogham inscriptions, were uncovered on the site in the 1980s. The ruins of Dromsicane Castle, dating to at least the 16th century, are located nearby.

A tower, dating to c. 1810, is within the enclosure of Millstreet's former Church of Ireland church. This church, built in the 1790s and dedicated to Saint Anna, was demolished (apart from the tower) in 1959.

The town's present Roman Catholic church was built in 1833 in a neo-classical style, and is dedicated to Saint Patrick. The building was enlarged and modified between 1931 and 1932, with the side walls moved out and the front moved closer to the entrance gate and given a new facade. A presbytery and the Presentation convent, which opened on 28 May 1840, were also built on the site.

== Culture ==
Since 1961, Millstreet Town Park has been used for a 'Christmas meeting' of a local coursing club. In 2021, the controversial practice of live hare coursing was subject to protest by local residents.

Since 1985, the town has been twinned with Pommerit-le-Vicomte in Brittany, France.

On 15 May 1993, the town hosted the 1993 Eurovision Song Contest. The idea was proposed to RTÉ by local businessman Noel C. Duggan, who also became the contest's organizer. The venue was the Green Glens Arena, then an equestrian centre. (To make it big enough to accommodate the stage, the arena's floor was dug out by a few feet.) As a result, the area was substantially changed, with the town receiving a "facelift" and each local business "adopted" an entrant. One of the town's locals put up a painting of the 25 national flags on a wall, which later became known as the "Eurovision Wall". The town was not big enough to accommodate all the people, who had to be lodged elsewhere. This made Millstreet the smallest town ever to host the competition.

After the 2022 Russian invasion of Ukraine, the Green Glens Arena was agreed to be used for temporary accommodation for Ukrainian refugees.

== Transport ==
The town is on the Mallow–Killarney–Tralee line of the Irish railway network. Millstreet railway station, which opened in 1853 and closed for some goods traffic in 1976, was refurbished in 1993 and remains open for passenger train services.

Bus Éireann provides bus service via the Macroom - Killarney route.

== People ==
- Timothy Carroll, Roman Catholic Bishop
- Billy Coleman, rally driver
- Mark Ellis, inter-county hurler
- Joanne O'Riordan, activist, journalist and People of the Year Award winner
