= John Thomas Mullock =

Roman Catholic bishop

The Right Reverend John Thomas Mullock, O.S.F.
- Bishop of St. John's, Newfoundland
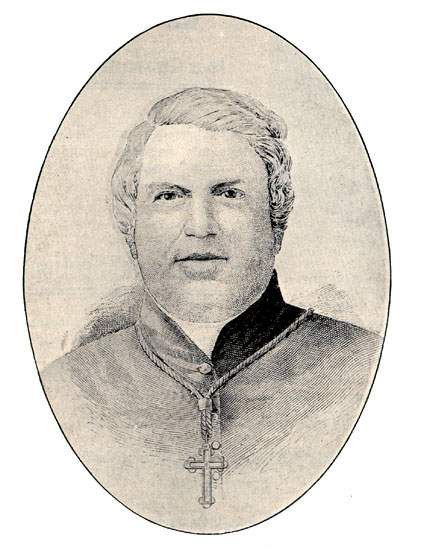
- Diocese: Diocese of St. John's, Newfoundland
- Appointed: 29 January 1856
- Term ended: 26 March 1869
- Predecessor: Michael Anthony Fleming, O.S.F.
- Successor: Thomas Joseph Power
- Other posts: Bishop of Newfoundland (1850-1856); (Coadjutor bishop of the Diocese of Newfoundland (1847-1850); Titular bishop of Thaumacus (1830-1850)

Orders
- Ordination: 10 April 1830
- Consecration: 27 December 1847 by Giacomo Filippo Fransoni

Personal details
- Born: 27 September 1807 Limerick, United Kingdom of Great Britain and Ireland
- Died: 26 March 1869 (aged 61) St. John's, Newfoundland, British Empire
- Buried: Basilica of St. John the Baptist, St. John's, Newfoundland and Labrador, Canada
- Denomination: Roman Catholic
- Education: St. Isidore's College

Styles of John T. Mullock
- Reference style: The Right Reverend
- Spoken style: Your Excellency
- Religious style: Monsignor
- Posthumous style: none

John Thomas Mullock (September 27, 1807 – March 26, 1869) was Roman Catholic bishop of St. John's, Newfoundland and did much to establish and develop the church in the region.

Born in Limerick, Ireland, he died in St. John's and is buried in the crypt of the Basilica of St. John the Baptist.

== Early life ==
Born in Limerick in 1807, Mullock was admitted as a Friar Minor in 1825, and then sent to be educated at St. Bonaventure's College in Seville. He went on to complete his seminary studies at St. Isidore's College in Rome. At the age of 26, he was ordained at the Basilica of St. John Lateran in Rome on 10 April 1830 by Cardinal Zuila.

After long service in Ireland - at Ennis, Cork, and Dublin - he was appointed in 1847, coadjutor bishop with right of succession to his fellow friar, Michael Anthony Fleming, O.S.F., Catholic Bishop of St. John's, Newfoundland, for which office he was consecrated by Cardinal Fransoni on 27 December 1847, at St. Isidore's.

Before leaving Ireland, he was a frequent contributor to the periodical literature of the day, and took an active part in the Irish literary movement of the 1840s.

== As Bishop ==
In July, 1850, Mullock succeeded Fleming. The Catholic Church made great progress in Newfoundland during his episcopate of Mullock, a new diocese, Harbour Grace, being erected.

The cathedral of St. John's, begun in 1841, was consecrated on 9 September 1855. He also opened in 1857 St Bonaventure's, a school for middle-class boys, as well as five churches. He also built a new episcopal palace and library, and eleven convents.

Mullock took a keen interest in the commercial development of Newfoundland, and was enthusiastic about its natural resources.

He was frequently consulted by the Governor on matters relating to the welfare of the country, and many of his suggestions relating to the fisheries and other matters were adopted.

Long before the first attempts to lay a submarine cable across the Atlantic was made (1857), Mullock had on several occasions publicly propounded the feasibility of connecting Europe with North America by means of submarine telegraph.

A good linguist in Spanish, French, and Italian, he was the first to bring before the English-speaking world the life and works of the Redemptorist founder and theologian, Alphonsus Maria de' Liguori, publishing his Life at Dublin in 1846, and in the following year a translation of the saint's History of Heresies and their Refutation.

In 1847, appeared at Dublin his Short History of the Irish Franciscan Province translated from the Latin work of Francis Ward. He also wrote The Cathedral of St. John's, Newfoundland and its consecration (Dublin, 1856) and published "Two Lectures on Newfoundland"(New York, 1860).

Unlike his predecessor, Mullock regarded himself as a Newfoundlander, and not just an Irish missionary, and was eager to profess local nuns and ordain local priests. Believing that "It is the duty of a Bishop to aid and advise his people in all their struggles for justice", he took an active part in political life.

When, in 1852, the Colonial Office refused to grant responsible government to Newfoundland, Mullock denounced it in extreme terms in a published letter. He and his priests became active and open supporters of the Liberal Party, which became the government when responsible government was granted three years later in 1855.

But he soon became disillusioned with politicians "who take care of themselves, and do nothing for the people". When the government finally fell, he nevertheless urged Catholics to vote for it, probably because the Anglican Bishop Edward Feild had endorsed the Conservatives.

In the ensuing election and its aftermath he pursued a somewhat inflammatory course culminating in his putting the inhabitants of Cat's Cove under the Episcopal Ban for political actions which displeased him.

However, in his later years Mullock threw his influence on the side of order, reminding his people that "the powers that be are ordained of God".

When Mullock died, the Governor, Sir Anthony Musgrave, attended the Requiem Mass, all the flags flew at half-mast, and all the shops closed. He and his contemporary Bishop Feild were among the most influential people in nineteenth century Newfoundland.

== Publications ==
Mullock’s writings include;

- The cathedral of St. John's Newfoundland with an account of its consecration (J. Duffy, 1856)
- Lectures on Newfoundland (Printed and for sale at the "Patriot" Office, 1860)
- Rome, past and present a lecture delivered in St. Dunstan's Cathedral, Charlottetown, Prince Edward Island, on Thursday August 16, 1860 (s.n., 1860)
- A sermon preached by the Right Rev. Dr. Mullock [Bishop of St. John's, Newfoundland, in the Cathedral of St. John's, on Friday, May 10, 1861]. (B. Duffy, 1861)
- Two lectures on Newfoundland delivered at St. Bonaventure's College, January 25, and February 1, 1860 (J. Mullaly, 1860)

He also translated Alphonsus Liguori’s The Triumph of the Church over all Heresies: A History of Heresies and Their Refutation.
