= Roman Catholic Diocese of Kontagora =

Roman Catholic diocese in Nigeria

Diocese of Kontagora Dioecesis Kongtagorana

Location
- Country: Nigeria
- Territory: a portion of Niger State
- Metropolitan: Kaduna
- Coordinates: 10°24′11″N 5°28′23″E

Statistics
- Area: 46,000 km^{2} (18,000 sq mi)
- Population: Total; Catholics: (as of 2022); 3,083,202; 93,202 (3.0%)
- Parishes: 22

Information
- Denomination: Roman Catholic
- Rite: Latin Rite
- Established: 2 April 2020
- Cathedral: Saint Michael Cathedral in Kontagora
- Secular priests: 36

Current leadership
- Pope: Leo XIV
- Bishop: Most Rev. Bulus Dauwa Yohanna

Map
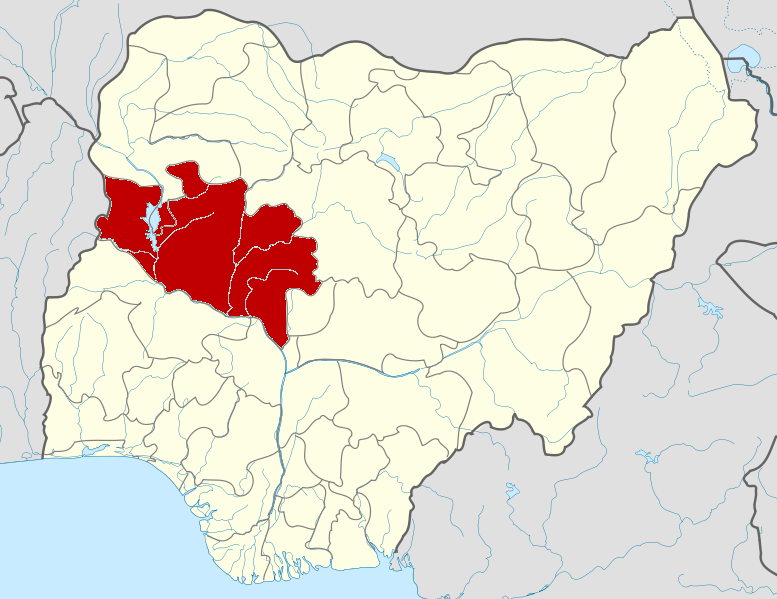
- Kontagora is located in Niger State which is shown here in red.

The Roman Catholic Diocese of Kontagora (Latin: Dioecesis Kongtagorana) is a Roman Catholic Diocese located in the city of Kontagora in Nigeria. It is a suffragan see in the Kaduna province.

== History ==
- 15 December 1995: Established as the Apostolic Prefecture of Kontagora from the Diocese of Ilorin, Diocese of Minna and Diocese of Sokoto
- 21 May 2002: Promoted as Apostolic Vicariate of Kontagora
- 2 April 2020: Promoted to Diocese of Kontagora

== Leadership ==
- Prefect Apostolic of Kontagora (Roman Rite)
  - Fr. Timothy Joseph Carroll, S.M.A. (December 15, 1995 – April 30, 2002 see below)
- Vicar Apostolics of Kontagora (Roman rite)
  - Bishop Timothy Joseph Carroll, S.M.A. (see above April 30, 2002 – April 30, 2010)
  - Bishop Bulus Dauwa Yohanna (February 2, 2012 - April 2, 2020 see below)
- Bishops of Kontagora (Roman rite)
  - Bishop Bulus Dauwa Yohanna (see above since April 2, 2020)

== Special Churches ==
- Saint Michael Cathedral in Kontagora

== Persecution ==
The diocese has not been immune to general problems of religious violence and Christian persecution in Nigeria. On 21 November, 2025, close to 300 people, among students and staff, were kidnapped from St. Mary’s Catholic School in Papiri, leading local bishop Bulus Dauwa Yohanna to say: "The kidnapping of our innocent students and dedicated staff of St. Mary’s Catholic School has brought deep sorrow to the families and the entire community. These children left their homes in search of education and were instead confronted with terror. Their families remain in anguish, unable to sleep, not knowing the condition of their loved ones. As a Church, our hearts are broken, but our faith remains firm". All the victims were eventually released, and several suspects were arrested, with the Bishop welcoming the development and expressing hope that justice would be served.
