= Timothy Carroll (bishop) =

Irish Catholic bishop in Nigeria

Timothy James Carroll S.M.A.
- Apostolic Vicar Emeritus of Kontagora
- Church: Catholic Church
- See: Apostolic Vicariate of Kontagora
- In office: 15 December 1995 – 30 April 2010
- Predecessor: Prefecture erected
- Successor: Bulus Dauwa Yohanna
- Other post: Titular Bishop of Tipasa in Mauretania (since 2002)

Orders
- Ordination: 20 December 1965
- Consecration: 17 August 2002 by Osvaldo Padilla

Personal details
- Born: 23 April 1940 (age 86) Millstreet, County Cork, Republic of Ireland

Timothy James Carroll S.M.A. (born 23 April 1940) is a Roman Catholic bishop serving as Apostolic Vicar in the titular see of Tipaza. He was born in Millstreet, County Cork Ireland.

He was ordained a priest on 20 December 1965 for the Society of African Missions and was appointed Prefect of Kontagora, Nigeria on 15 December 1995.

Bishop Tim translated several books of the Bible, including the Synoptic Gospels, into Kamberi.

On 30 April 2002, he was appointed titular bishop of Tipasa in Mauretania and Apostolic Vicar of Kontagora. He was ordained a bishop on 17 August 2002. The Principal Consecrator was Archbishop Osvaldo Padilla (Roman Catholic); his Principal Co-Consecrators were Archbishop Peter Jatau (Roman Catholic) and Bishop Kevin Aje (Roman Catholic).
