= Diocese of Grand Falls =

Catholic ecclesiastical territory

Coordinates: 48.9294°N 55.6601°W

Diocese of Grand Falls Dioecesis Grandfallensis

Location
- Country: Canada
- Ecclesiastical province: St. John's

Statistics
- Population: 37,200 (20.2%)
- Parishes: 30

Information
- Denomination: Roman Catholic
- Rite: Roman Rite
- Established: 30 Oct 1964
- Cathedral: Cathedral of the Immaculate Conception

Current leadership
- Pope: Leo XIV
- Bishop: Robert Anthony Daniels

Website
- rcdioceseofgfnl.org

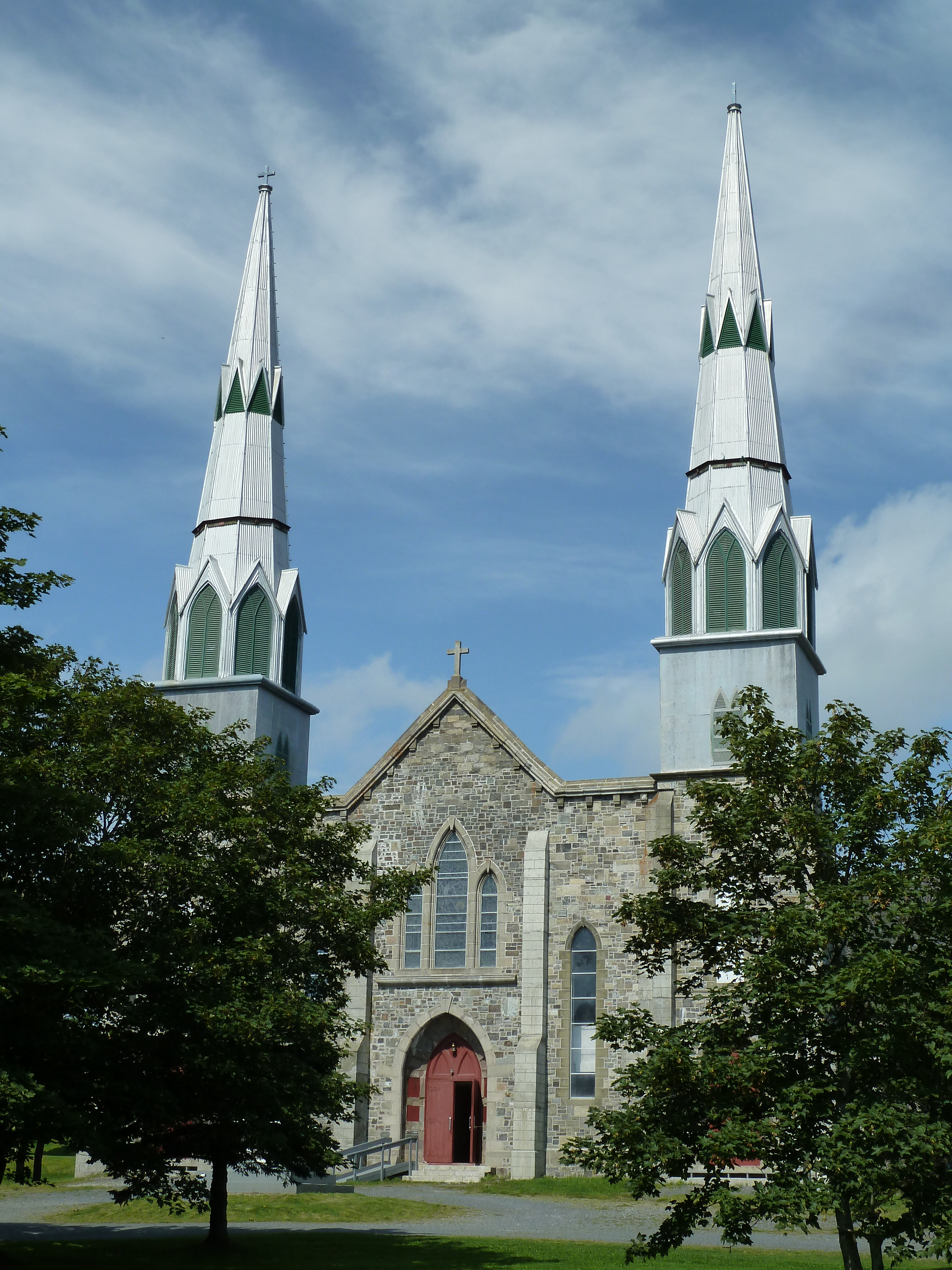
Cathedral of Immaculate Conception, Harbour Grace, Newfoundland and Labrador

The Roman Catholic Diocese of Grand Falls (Latin: Dioecesis Grandfallensis) (erected 29 February 1856, as the Diocese of Harbour Grace) is a Latin suffragan in the Atlantic Canadian ecclesiastical province of the Metropolitan Archdiocese of St. John's, Newfoundland.

The cathedral episcopal see is the Marian Cathedral of the Immaculate Conception, in Grand Falls-Windsor, and it has a former Cathedral, also dedicated to the Immaculate Conception, in Harbour Grace, Newfoundland and Labrador.

== History ==
- Established on 1856.02.29 as Diocese of Harbour Grace / Portus Gratiæ (Latin) on territory split off from the Archdiocese of St. John's.
- Lost territories repeatedly: on 1870.09.16 to establish Apostolic Prefecture of Placentia and on 1945.07.13 to establish Apostolic Vicariate of Labrador.
- It was renamed as the Diocese of Harbour Grace-Grand Falls on 22 February 1958 and again as the Diocese of Grand Falls on 30 October 1964.

== Statistics ==
As per 2014, it pastorally served 40,900 Catholics (20.7% of 197,400 total) on 42,368 km^{2} in 30 parishes and 43 missions with 29 priests (diocesan), 1 deacon and 15 lay religious sisters.

== Bishops ==
=== Ordinaries ===
(all Roman Rite)

Suffragan Bishops of Harbour Grace

- John Dalton; Friars Minor (O.F.M.) (1856.02.29 – death 1869.05.05)
- Enrico Carfagnini, O.F.M. (1870.05.13 – 1880.02.27), next Bishop of Gallipoli (Italy) (1880.02.27 – retired 1898.03.24), emeritate as Titular Archbishop of Cius (1898.03.24 – death 1904.02.12)
- Ronald MacDonald (1881.05.24 – retired 1906.09.03), emeritate as Titular Archbishop of Gortyna (1906.09.03 – death 1912.09.17)
- John March (1906.09.04 – death 1940.01.12)
- John Michael O'Neill (1940.01.12 – 1958.02.22 see below)

Suffragan Bishops of Harbour Grace–Grand Falls

- John Michael O'Neill (see above 1958.02.22 – 1964.10.30 see below), died 1974

Suffragan Bishops of Grand Falls

- John Michael O'Neill (see above 1964.10.30 – 1972.11.23), died 1974
- Alphonsus Liguori Penney (1972.11.23 – 1979.04.05), next Metropolitan Archbishop of St. John's, Newfoundland (Canada) (1979.04.05 – retired 1991.02.02)
- Joseph Faber MacDonald (1980.01.11 – 1998.10.23), next Bishop of Saint John, New Brunswick (Canada) (1998.10.23 – 2006.09.09); died 2012
- Martin William Currie (2000.12.12 – 1 March 2011), also Apostolic Administrator of Saint John, New Brunswick (Canada) (2006.09.09 – 2007.05.08), Metropolitan Archbishop of St. John's, Newfoundland (Canada) (2007.10.18 – ...)
- Robert Anthony Daniels (1 March 2011 - ...), previously Titular Bishop of Scebatiana (2004.09.21 – 2011.03.01) as Auxiliary Bishop of London (Ontario, Canada) (2004.09.21 – 2011.03.01).

=== Other priest of this diocese who became bishop ===
- Brian Joseph Dunn, appointed Auxiliary Bishop of Sault Sainte Marie, Ontario in 2008

== Bibliography ==
- "Diocese of Grand Falls". Catholic-Hierarchy.

== Sources and external links ==
- Roman Catholic Diocese of Grand Falls site
- GCatholic with Google map and satellite photo
- Acta Apostolicae Sedis with the decree renaming the diocese
