= Archdiocese of St. John's, Newfoundland =

Latin Catholic territory in Canada

Coordinates: 47.5656°N 52.7082°W

Archdiocese of St. John's, Newfoundland Archidioecesis Sancti Ioannis Terrae Novae
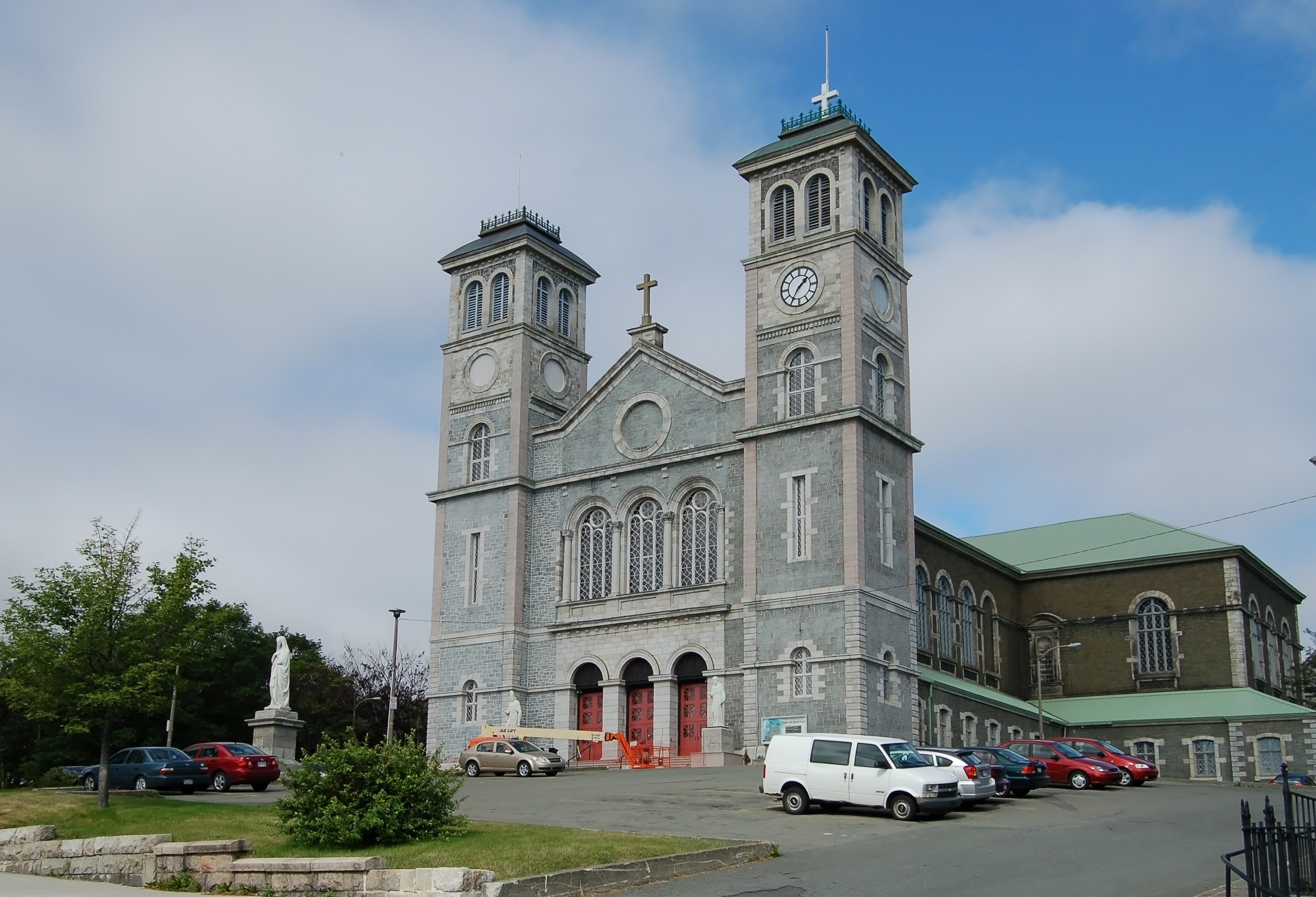
- Basilica of St. John the Baptist, the archdiocesan cathedral

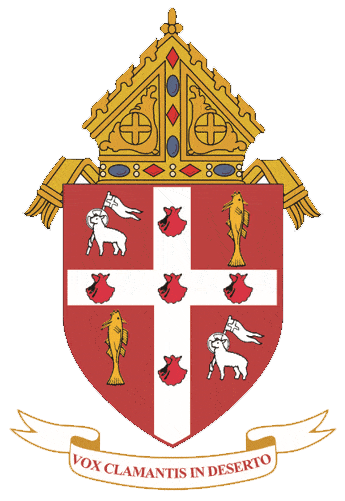
- Coat of arms

Location
- Country: Canada
- Territory: Newfoundland and Labrador
- Ecclesiastical province: Archdiocese of St. John's, Newfoundland
- Population: 120,135 (49.6%)

Information
- Denomination: Catholic Church
- Sui iuris church: Latin Church
- Rite: Roman Rite
- Established: 30 May 1784; 242 years ago
- Cathedral: Basilica of St. John the Baptist
- Patron saint: St. John the Baptist

Current leadership
- Pope: Leo XIV
- Archbishop: Peter Hundt
- Suffragans: Robert Anthony Daniels; Bishop of Grand Falls; Bart van Roijen; Bishop of Corner Brook and Labrador
- Bishops emeritus: Martin William Currie

Website
- rcsj.org

The Archdiocese of St. John's, Newfoundland (Latin: Archidioecesis Sancti Ioannis Terrae Novae) is a Latin Church ecclesiastical territory or archdiocese of the Catholic Church in St. John's, Newfoundland and Labrador, Canada. It is the metropolitan of an ecclesiastical province with two suffragan dioceses: Grand Falls and Corner Brook and Labrador. The current archbishop is the Most Reverend Peter Hundt. The Archdiocese of St. John's is the oldest Roman Catholic ecclesiastical jurisdiction in English-speaking North America.

The Basilica of St. John the Baptist is the cathedral of the archdiocese. The building sits within the St. John's Ecclesiastical District, a National Historic District of Canada.

== History ==
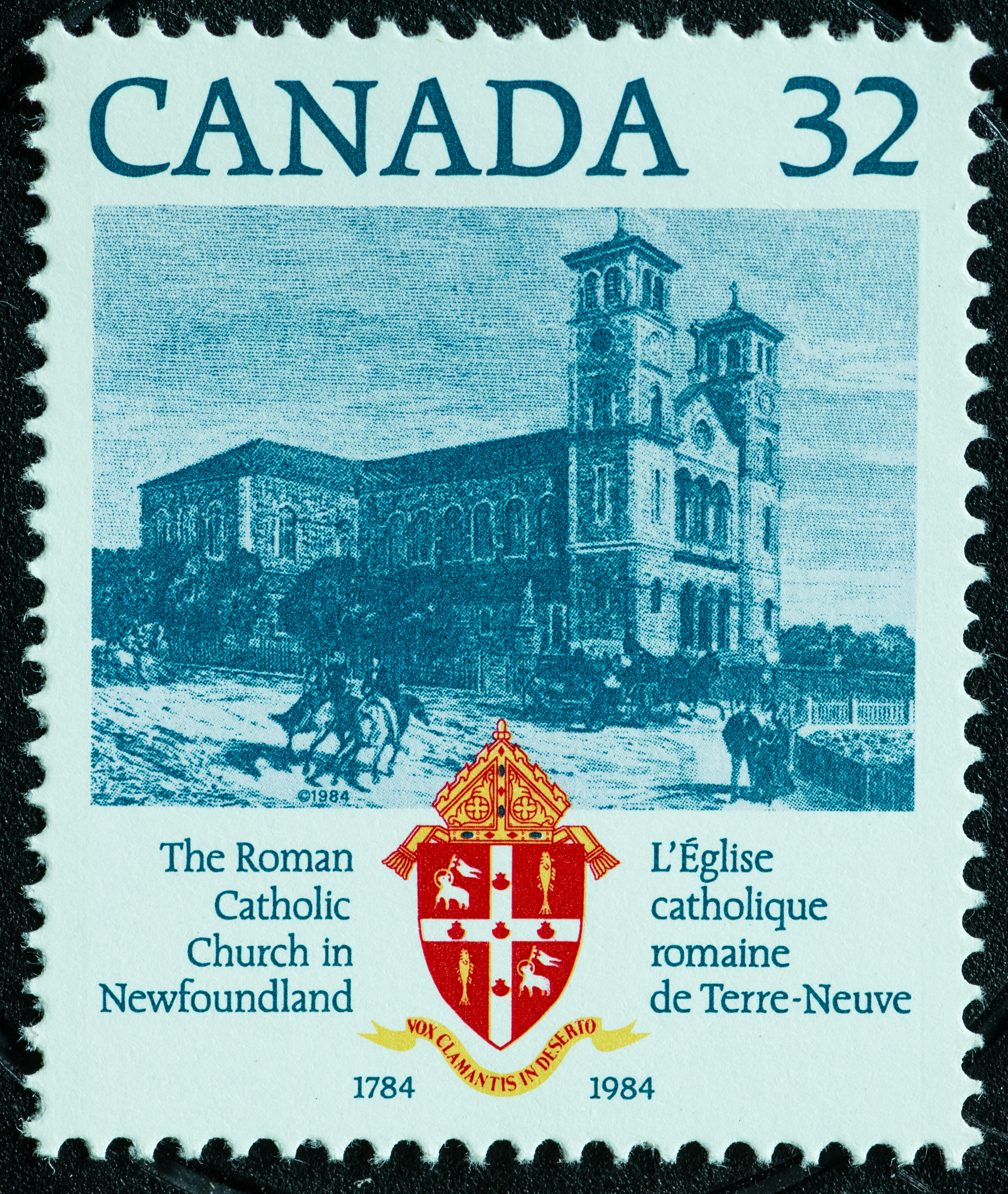
1984 postage stamp

The first Catholic presence in North America was the proprietary Colony of Avalon, established by George Calvert, 1st Baron Baltimore in 1610. A Catholic himself, Calvert intended the colony to be open to Irish and English Catholics facing persecution at home.

The future Archdiocese of St. John's was established 30 May 1784 as Catholics in Newfoundland gradually gained religious liberty, made explicit by a public declaration by Governor John Campbell. After a request from Irish merchants in St. John's to Bishop William Egan, Bishop of Waterford and Lismore, James Louis O'Donel was appointed Prefect Apostolic of Newfoundland, as a pre-diocesan jurisdiction entitled to a titular bishop and exempt, i.e., directly subject to the Holy See, not part of any ecclesiastical province. In addition to O'Donel's personal popularity, one of his qualifications for the position was an ability to preach in Newfoundland Irish.

It was promoted to a Vicariate Apostolic on 5 January 1796 and on 4 June 1847 was elevated to a diocese.

In 1904, St. John's was elevated to an archdiocese.

In July 2021, the Archdiocese of St. John's announced plans to sell off assets in order to compensate victims of the Mount Cashel sex abuse scandal.

=== Sex abuse scandals ===
For decades, the Archdiocese of St. John's has been tied to sex abuse scandals.

In 1988, a scandal erupted over allegations of widespread abuse of children at Mount Cashel Orphanage. From 1989 to 1993, nine Christian Brothers were charged and prosecuted for various criminal offences including sex offences against the boys of Mount Cashel orphanage. The religious order that ran the orphanage filed for bankruptcy in the face of numerous lawsuits. Since the Mount Cashel scandal erupted, a number of priests across the country have been accused of sexual abuse.

In July 2020, Rev. Peter Power, who was originally from the Archdiocese of Toronto, was charged with charges of sexual touching, sexual assault and committing an indecent act involving two teenaged boys, aged 18 and 16 years old at a residence in a small Newfoundland community earlier in the year. Though officially retired, Power was still occasionally active in Catholic ministry when he relocated to Newfoundland.

The same month in July 2020, the Newfoundland and Labrador court of appeal unanimously reversed a 2018 decision of the Supreme Court of Newfoundland and Labrador and ruled that the Roman Catholic Archdiocese of St. John's was vicariously liable for the sexual abuse committed at the Mount Cashel Orphanage in the 1950s and 1960s, paving the way for victims of the Mount Cashel sex abuse scandal to receive compensation from the Diocese.

In July 2021, the Roman Catholic Archdiocese of NL announced plans to sell off assets in order to compensate victims of the Mount Cashel sex abuse scandal.

On July 5, 2024, a third-party insolvency monitor put forward a sum of $104 million to pay the victims of sexual abuse by the Archdiocese. A document filed with Newfoundland and Labrador Supreme Court put the net claim award at $104,074,667. Among the 367 claims filed, 292 had already been accepted, while 65 were disallowed and 10 were considered pending. The document stated the average payment to a claimant was $356,417.

== Bishops ==
=== Prefecture Apostolic of Newfoundland ===
#	Image	Name	From	Until
Erected: 30 May 1784
1		James Louis O'Donel O.F.M.	17 May 1784	→

=== Vicariate Apostolic of Newfoundland ===
#	Image	Name	From	Until
Elevated: 5 January 1796
1		James Louis O'Donel O.F.M.	←	1 January 1807
2		Patrick Lambert O.F.M.	1 January 1807	23 September 1816
3		Thomas Scallan O.F.M.	23 September 1816	7 June 1830
4		Michael Anthony Fleming O.F.S.	7 June 1830	→

=== Diocese of Newfoundland ===
#	Image	Name	From	Until
Elevated: 4 June 1847
4		Michael Anthony Fleming O.F.S.	←	14 July 1850
5		John Thomas Mullock O.F.M.	14 July 1850	→

=== Diocese of St. John's, Newfoundland ===
#	Image	Name	From	Until
Name Changed: 29 February 1856
5		John Thomas Mullock O.F.M.	←	29 March 1869
6		Thomas Joseph Power	13 May 1870	4 December 1893
7		Michael Francis Howley	5 January 1895	→

=== Archdiocese of St. John's, Newfoundland ===
#	Image	Name	From	Until
Elevated: 8 February 1904
7		Michael Francis Howley	←	15 October 1914
8		Edward Patrick Roche	26 February 1915	23 September 1950
9		Patrick James Skinner C.I.M.	23 January 1951	28 March 1979
10		Alphonsus Liguori Penney	28 March 1979	2 February 1991
11		James Hector MacDonald C.S.C.	2 February 1991	4 December 2000
12		Brendan O'Brien	4 December 2000	1 June 2007
13		Martin William Currie	18 October 2007	12 December 2018
14		Peter Joseph Hundt	12 December 2018	→

=== Coadjutor bishops ===
- Patrick Lambert, O.F.M. Ref. (1805-1807) as Coadjutor Vicar Apostolic
- Thomas Scallan, O.F.M. Ref.(1815-1816) as Coadjutor Vicar Apostolic
- Michael Anthony Fleming, O.F.M. Ref. (1829-1830) as Coadjutor Vicar Apostolic
- John Thomas Mullock, O.F.M. Ref. (1847-1850)
- Thomas John Flynn (1945-1949), did not succeed to the see

=== Auxiliary bishop ===
- Thomas Francis Brennan (1893-1905)
- Patrick James Skinner, C.I.M. (1950-1951), appointed Archbishop of St. John's (1951)

=== Other priests of this diocese who became bishops ===
- William Aquin Carew, appointed titular Archbishop of Telde in 1969, serving as Apostolic Nuncio to Burundi and Rwanda (1969-1974), Apostolic Pro-Nuncio to Cyprus (1974-1983), Apostolic Delegate to Jerusalem and Palestine (1974-1983), and Apostolic Pro-Nuncio to Japan (1983-1997).
- Michael Fintan Power, appointed Bishop of Saint George's, Newfoundland in 1911.
- Henry Thomas Renouf, appointed Bishop of Saint George's, Newfoundland in 1920.
- Richard Thomas McGrath, appointed Bishop of Saint George's, Newfoundland in 1970.
- Raymond John Lahey, appointed Bishop of Saint George's, Newfoundland in 1986. Lahey was laicized in 2012.

== Bibliography ==
- Archdiocese of St. John's, Newfoundland page at catholichierarchy.org retrieved July 14, 2006
- Newfoundland Biographies - Newfoundland History retrieved November 30, 2007
