= Thomas Joseph Power =

Irish Roman Catholic Bishop

- Bishop of St. John’s, Newfoundland
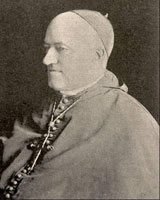
- Installed: 8 May 1870
- Term ended: 4 December 1893
- Predecessor: John Thomas Mullock
- Successor: Michael Francis Howley

Orders
- Ordination: 10 June 1854

Personal details
- Born: 10 December 1830 near New Ross, Ireland
- Died: 4 December 1893 (aged 62) St. John's, Newfoundland
- Denomination: Catholic
- Profession: Priest, Bishop
- Education: Carlow College; Irish College in Rome

Bishop Thomas Joseph Power BA (Lon) MA (Lon) (1830–1893) was an Irish Roman Catholic Bishop. He was born near New Ross, County Wexford, Ireland, on 10 December 1830 to Martin Power, a publican, and Catherine Sutton. He attended St. Patrick's Tullow, County Carlow, and then Carlow College (1843-1853). At the time Carlow students could sit exams for degrees from the University of London and he was awarded a BA in 1850. He went on to study for a MA. He completed his studies in the Irish College in Rome (1853-1855) and was ordained a priest there by Archbishop Paul Cullen, and returned to Dublin to serve. From 1859 to 1870 he served as President of Clonliffe College.

In 1870 in Rome again this time by Cardinal Cullen he was ordained the 6th Bishop of St. John's, Newfoundland. In Newfoundland he was responsible for many developments such as the building of St. Patrick's Church, bringing the Irish Christian Brothers and the setting up of orphanages.

He died in St. John's on 4 December 1893 and was succeeded by Bishop Michael Francis Howley.
