= Bulus Dauwa Yohanna =

Nigerian Catholic prelate

- Bishop of Kontagora
- Church: Catholic Church
- Diocese: Diocese of Kontagora
- Appointed: 2 February 2012
- Predecessor: Timothy Carroll
- Previous posts: Titular Bishop of Scebatiana (2012-2020)

Orders
- Ordination: 10 January 1998
- Consecration: 3 May 2012 by Augustine Kasujja

Personal details
- Born: 15 December 1970 (age 55)

Bulus Dauwa Yohanna (born 15 December 1970) is a Nigerian Catholic prelate who serves as the Bishop of Kontagora.

== Biography ==
Yohanna was ordained a priest for the Diocese of Ilorin on 10 January 1998 and was incardinated into the clergy of the Apostolic Vicariate of Kontagora on 21 May 2002. Pope Benedict XVI appointed him Apostolic Vicar of Kontagora and Titular Bishop of Scebatiana on 2 February 2012. He was episcopally consecrated by Archbishop Augustine Kasujja, the then Apostolic Nuncio to Nigeria, on 3 May of the same year. The coconsecrators were Archbishop Matthew Man-Oso Ndagoso of Kaduna archdiocese and Ayo-Maria Atoyebi of Ilorin diocese. The Apostolic Vicariate was elevated to the Diocese of Kontagora by Pope Francis and Yohanna became its first diocesan bishop on 2 April 2020.

In 2025 the Diocese of Kontagora witnessed the kidnapping of around 300 people, mostly students, from a Catholic School, leading the bishop to say: "The kidnapping of our innocent students and dedicated staff of St. Mary’s Catholic School has brought deep sorrow to the families and the entire community. These children left their homes in search of education and were instead confronted with terror. Their families remain in anguish, unable to sleep, not knowing the condition of their loved ones. As a Church, our hearts are broken, but our faith remains firm". All the victims were eventually released.
