= Edward Patrick Roche =

Archbishop of St. John's, Newfoundland

- Archbishop of St. John's, Newfoundland
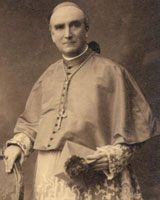
- Church: Catholic Church
- Archdiocese: St. John's, Newfoundland
- Appointed: 26 February 1915
- Term ended: 23 September 1950
- Predecessor: Michael Francis Howley
- Successor: Patrick James Skinner

Orders
- Ordination: 24 June 1897
- Consecration: 29 June 1915 by Pellegrino Stagni

Personal details
- Born: 19 February 1874 Newfoundland Colony
- Died: 23 September 1950 (aged 76) St. John's, Newfoundland, Canada
- Buried: Basilica of St. John the Baptist

Edward Patrick Roche (1874–1950) was a Newfoundlander prelate of the Roman Catholic Church. He served as Archbishop of St. John's from 1915 to 1950. At the time of his appointment and until 1949, Newfoundland was not part of Canada and so he reported directly to the Pope. He opposed Newfoundland becoming part of Canada.

== Life ==
Born on 19 February 1874 in Place Harbour, Placentia Bay, Newfoundland. Roche was educated at St. Patrick's Hall, St. Bonaventure's College, St. John's, and All Hallows College, Dublin, Ireland, where he was ordained on June 24, 1897.

After ordination, he returned to Newfoundland and ministered in Conception Bay South. In 1907, he became the Vicar General of the Archdiocese of St. John's.

He was appointed Archbishop by Pope Pius X and consecrated by Monsignor Stagni, Apostolic Delegate to Newfoundland at the Cathedral of St. John the Baptist on 29 June 1915.

He suffered from tuberculosis, but it was treated in New York and so he returned to his pastoral duties.

Responsible for the developments of many educational institutions, he played a significant role in the development of St. Clare's Mercy Hospital.

He opposed Newfoundland joining Canada, like many other members of the Catholic clergy, and he articulated his view prior to the 1948 referendums. In reaction, the Loyal Orange Association advised Protestants to resist Catholic influence by supporting union with Canada. The results were correlated with demographics, and most districts on the Avalon Peninsula, with mostly Catholic voters, supported responsible government, instead of Confederation.

Roche died in 1950 and is buried under the main altar of the Basilica in St. John's. He was succeeded by Bishop Patrick J. Skinner.
