= Michael Anthony Fleming =

Irish-born Franciscan bishop

The Right Reverend Michael Anthony Fleming, O.F.M.
- Bishop of St. John's, Newfoundland
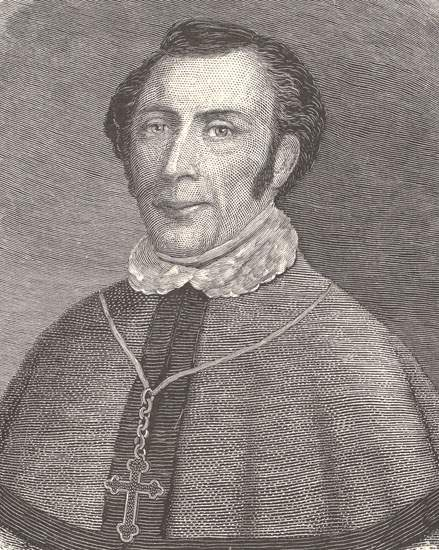
- Diocese: St. John's, Newfoundland
- Appointed: 4 June 1847
- Term ended: 14 July 1850
- Predecessor: Thomas Scallan, O.S.F.
- Successor: John T. Mullock, O.S.F.
- Other posts: Vicar Apostolic of Newfoundland (1830-1847); Coadjutor bishop of the Apostolic Vicariate of Newfoundland (1829-1830); Titular bishop of Carpasia (1829-1847)

Orders
- Ordination: 15 October 1815
- Consecration: 28 October 1829 by Thomas Scallan, O.S.F.

Personal details
- Born: 1792 Carrick-on-Suir, County Tipperary, Kingdom of Ireland
- Died: 14 July 1850 (aged 57–58) St. John's, Colony of Newfoundland, British Empire
- Buried: Basilica of St. John the Baptist, St. John's, Newfoundland and Labrador
- Denomination: Roman Catholic

Styles of Michael Anthony Fleming
- Reference style: The Right Reverend
- Spoken style: Your Lordship / Your Excellency
- Religious style: Monsignor
- Posthumous style: none

Michael Anthony Fleming, O.F.M. (c. 1792 – July 14, 1850) was an Irish-born Franciscan who served as the Catholic bishop of St. John's, Newfoundland. He was principally responsible for developing a small mission with a few priests in four parishes into a large diocese with over 40,000 faithful and was the single most influential Irish immigrant to come to the Colony of Newfoundland in the 19th century. He was the principal force behind the creation of the Cathedral of St. John the Baptist in St. John's.

== Biography ==
=== Early life ===
Fleming was born about three miles from Carrick-on-Suir, County Tipperary, Ireland. As a boy, he studied the classics for two years at Stradbally, County Waterford, under a Protestant pastor. Encouraged by his uncle, Martin Fleming, O.S.F., he entered the novitiate of the friars in Wexford, and was subsequently transferred to the Franciscan house of studies there. Fleming was ordained a Catholic priest on 15 October 1815, after which he was assigned to the friary at Carrickbeg, where his uncle was guardian. His experience in helping to rebuild the Franciscan chapel there marked him at an early age as a "builder", and stood him in good stead for his later work in Newfoundland.

=== Mission to Newfoundland ===
In 1823, at the invitation of Thomas Scallan, O.S.F., the Vicar Apostolic for Newfoundland, and the Benevolent Irish Society, Fleming was recruited to serve as a priest in the colony. From the outset, he proved to be of a very different temperament from Scallan. His ideas about the place of the Irish and Catholicism in Newfoundland were informed by his experience of his close friend Daniel O'Connell's nationalist politics in Ireland.

Despite their very different perspectives on many matters, Fleming was promoted by Scallan as his successor, and he was appointed coadjutor bishop of the vicariate by Pope Pius VIII on 10 July 1829, with the titular see of Carpasia.

=== Bishop ===
Soon after Fleming was consecrated as a bishop by Scallan in the Chapel in St. John's on 28 October 1829, he implemented his Ultramontanist ideology, taking over control of an existing Catholic institution, the Orphan Asylum from its lay administrators, members of the Benevolent Irish Society. When Scallan died on 29 May 1830, Fleming automatically succeeded him as Vicar Apostolic and embarked on a systematic expansion of institutional Catholicism in Newfoundland. This included the construction of new parish churches, the subdivision of existing parishes into new parishes, the recruitment of Irish priests, and the introduction of two religious orders of Irish women to teach young girls. He took pains to visit outport Newfoundland, and during the winter of 1835 lived in a fishing room at Petty Harbour. He administered smallpox vaccine to the whole community of Catholics and Anglicans, and remained in quarantine with them when no physician or other clergyman would go there.

Fleming's influence was not limited to the religious sphere. As Vicar Apostolic, and later as diocesan Bishop, he promoted the interest of Irish Catholics in Newfoundland's political sphere. By petitioning the governor and the Colonial Office, Fleming was instrumental in enforcing the Emancipation Act for Irish Catholics in Newfoundland in 1832. In addition, with the parallel granting of Representative Government for the colony, Fleming was outspoken in the political process, lending support to candidates, both Catholic and Protestant, who furthered the rights and privileges he felt were important for the coony's Irish Catholic population. Whether in church administration, education or political activities, Fleming's bold actions and attitude marked a significant departure for Newfoundland's Catholic clergy.

Because of his deliberate political influence, Fleming, himself an "Irish nationalistic", was viewed by many English and Protestants as a disruptive force in Newfoundland politics, and by many of his supporting Irish congregants as a constructive force in Newfoundland politics. He saw himself as the leader of the Irish community and was not shy about taking on the local British establishment, much as his friend and countryman Daniel O'Connell was doing at home, especially since he felt threatened by the Church of England's attempts to counteract growing Catholic influence. The struggle spilled over into inflammatory newspaper editorials, and lawsuits between increasingly bitter rivals. Tensions were made worse by the actions of partisans on both sides of the divide. Fleming intervened to get particular men elected, raising in the Tory minds the spector of a "priests' party" dominating the Assembly. From this point, church influence remained a dominant factor in Newfoundland politics from the 1830s onward.

=== Newfoundland tricolour ===
Newfoundland Tricolour (flag ratio: 1:2)

In popular legend, Fleming is credited with creating the "Pink, white and green" tricolour flag of Newfoundland. It is recounted that during annual wood hauls for the Anglican cathedral and Roman Catholic cathedral, considerable rivalry developed between the two groups involved. The Protestant English marked their wood piles with the pink flag of the Natives' Society, while the Catholic Irish used green banners. The threat of violence was such that Bishop Fleming intervened, and persuaded them to adopt a common flag, on which the pink and green would be separated by a white stripe to symbolize peace. The pink symbolized the Tudor Rose of England (The Protestants) and the Green symbolized St. Patrick's Emblem of Ireland (The Catholics). The White is taken from St. Andrew's Cross (St. Andrew is the Patron Saint of Fishermen and Scotland). This legend, its symbolism and origins, have all been disproven by historical evidence. In reality, the Newfoundland "pink, white and green" tricolour did not appear until at least 41 years after the inception of the Irish tricolour and was almost certainly based on the Irish flag. There is no primary source documentary historical evidence contemporary to Fleming's time linking Fleming with the creation of the tricolour. Any such associations are purely fanciful, and can be seen to have largely originated in the writings of the entertainer and writer Paul O'Neill.

=== Expansion ===
Fleming's greatest domestic projects, the ones for which he became best remembered, were the recruiting of two orders of Irish religious women to work as teachers, and the construction of a new cathedral for St. John's. In 1833 at Fleming's request, the Presentation Sisters came to Newfoundland from Galway and opened a school for children. Within weeks the sisters were inundated with new pupils, the children of the Irish of St. John's, who saw education as the best means of economic and social advancement. In 1842, Fleming invited the Sisters of Mercy to come to teach girls and to help create a Catholic middle class. Through Fleming's influence, the Education Act of 1836 introduced the precedent of granting state funds to denominations for educational purposes. In 1847, Bishop Fleming recruited four brothers of the order of Irish Franciscans to come to Newfoundland to teach at the Benevolent Irish Society's school. Through the 1830s, Fleming pursued a grant of land on which to build a cathedral. By 1838 the land was awarded, and construction began, continuing until 1855. The Basilica of St. John the Baptist was the largest building project in 19th century Newfoundland, and thereafter became the definitive icon of Newfoundland Catholicism.

Fleming died in 1850 and was buried in his cathedral.

== Honors ==
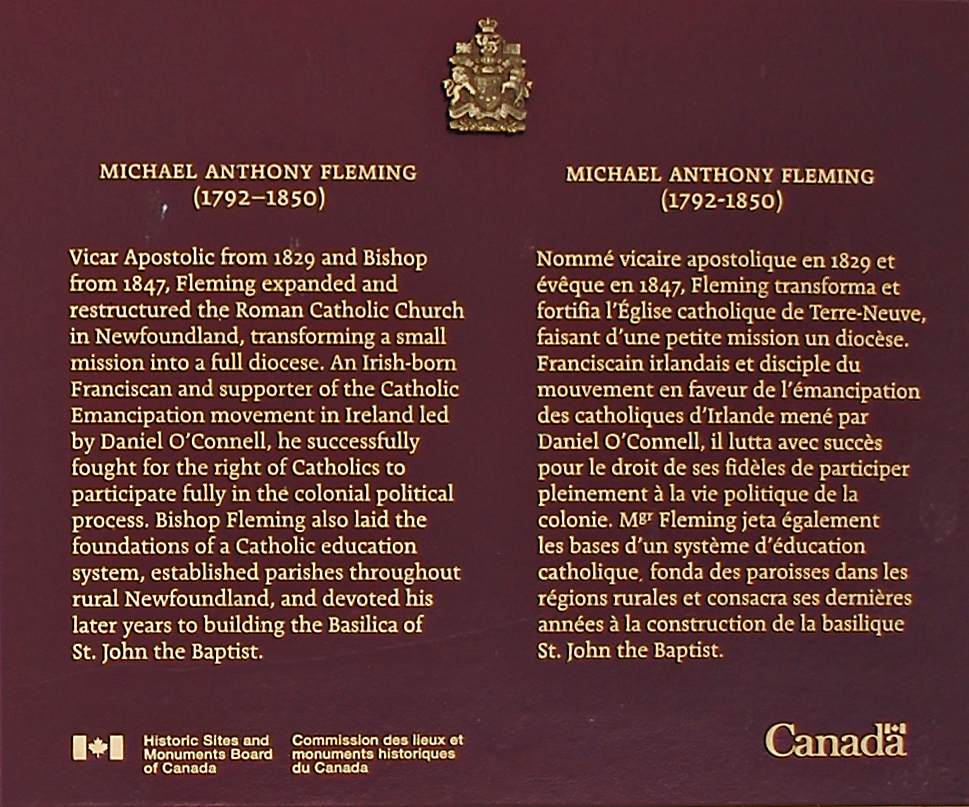
Plaque for Bishop Fleming

On 9 September 2005, the 150th anniversary of the consecration of Fleming's cathedral, a plaque was unveiled by the Historic Sites and Monuments Board of Canada designating Fleming as a person of Canadian National Historic Significance. At the time of its consecration, the Roman Catholic Cathedral of St. John's was the largest Irish Neoclassical cathedral in the New World.

== See also ==
John Thomas Mullock
