= Scebatiana =

Africa Proconsularis (125 AD)

Scebatiana was an ancient civitas of the Roman Province of Byzacena during the Roman Empire and late antiquity. The exact location of the town is unknown, but is thought to be somewhere in southern Tunisia.

== Ancient Bishopric ==
Scebatiana was the seat of an ancient Christian bishopric, of the Roman province of Byzacena.

The only known bishop of this Ancient diocese is Vittorino, who took part in the synod gathered in Carthage by the Vandal king Huneric in 484, following which he was exiled.

The ancient bishopric survives today as a titular bishopric of the Roman Catholic Church, and the current bishop is Francisco César García Magán.

Known previous bishops include:

- Vittorino (fl484)
- Acacio Chacón Guerra (Venezuela) 1966–1971
- Florentino Zabalza Iturri (Brazil) 1971–1978
- Miguel Delgado Ávila (Venezuela) 1979–1991
- Carlito Cenzon (Philippines) 1992–2004
- Robert Anthony Daniels (London, Ontario, Canada) 2004–2011
- Bulus Dauwa Yohanna (Nigeria) since 1 February 2012
- Francisco César García Magán (Spain) since 15 January 2022
