= Basilica of St. John the Baptist =

Historic church in Newfoundland and Labrador, Canada

Basilica-Cathedral of St. John the Baptist
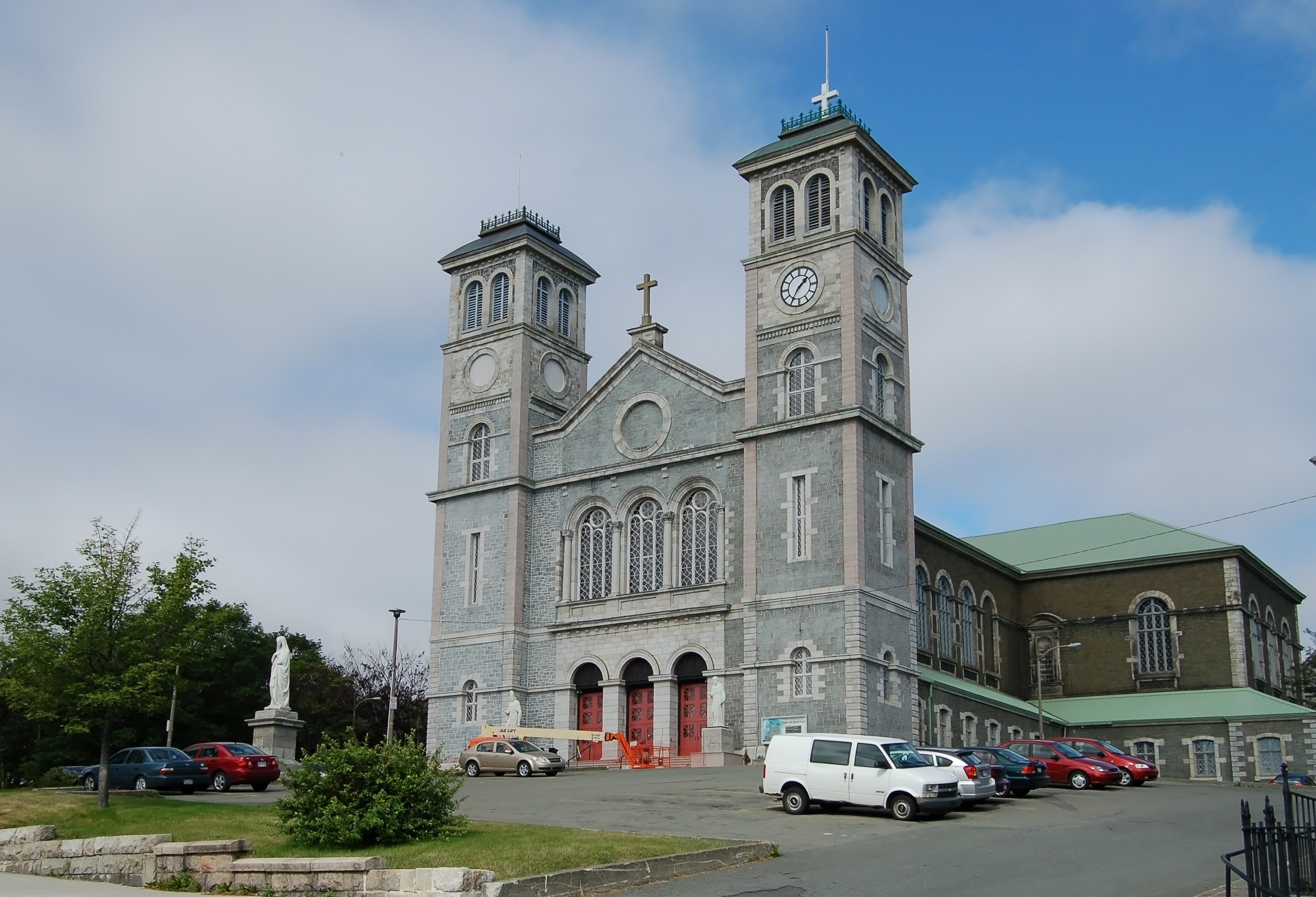

Religion
- Affiliation: Catholic Church
- Diocese: Archdiocese of St. John's
- Ecclesiastical or organisational status: Minor basilica Metropolitan cathedral
- Leadership: Archbishop Peter Hundt

Location
- Location: 200 Military Road; St. John's, Newfoundland and Labrador; A1C 5M3
- Interactive map of Basilica-Cathedral of St. John the Baptist
- Coordinates: 47°34′02.48″N 52°42′36.36″W

Architecture
- Architect: John Philpot Jones
- Type: Latin Cross, basilica
- Style: Lombard Romanesque
- Completed: 1855

Specifications
- Direction of façade: East
- Capacity: 2,500 seated
- Length: 85 metres (279 ft)
- Width: 65 metres (213 ft)
- Width (nave): 16 metres (52 ft)
- Height (max): 48 metres (157 ft)
- Materials: Irish granite & limestone Newfoundland sandstone Italian marble Egyptian travertine

National Historic Site of Canada
- Official name: Basilica of St. John the Baptist National Historic Site of Canada
- Designated: 1983

Website
- thebasilica.church

The Basilica-Cathedral of Saint John the Baptist in St. John's, Newfoundland and Labrador, Canada is the metropolitan cathedral of the Roman Catholic Archdiocese of St. John's, Newfoundland. The building sits within the St. John's Ecclesiastical District, a National Historic District of Canada. The Basilica-Cathedral was the largest building project to its date in Newfoundland history.

Construction lasted from the excavation of the ground in May 1839, through the laying of the cornerstone in May 1841, until the completion and consecration on 9 September 1855. At this time, it was the largest church building in North America and remains the second largest church in Canada after Saint Joseph's Oratory in Montreal and the largest cathedral church in Canada. The Basilica-Cathedral is one of the few buildings in St. John's to survive the Great Fire of 1892.

Pope Pius XII raised the cathedral to the status of minor Basilica via his decree Terra Novæ Cæruleis on 30 May 1955, coinciding with its centennial anniversary. The decree was signed and notarized by the Apostolic Chancellor Ermenegildo Brugnola.

On 12 December 2018, Bishop Peter Hundt of the Roman Catholic Diocese of Corner Brook and Labrador was appointed Archbishop and took canonical possession of the diocese on 29 January 2019.

== History ==
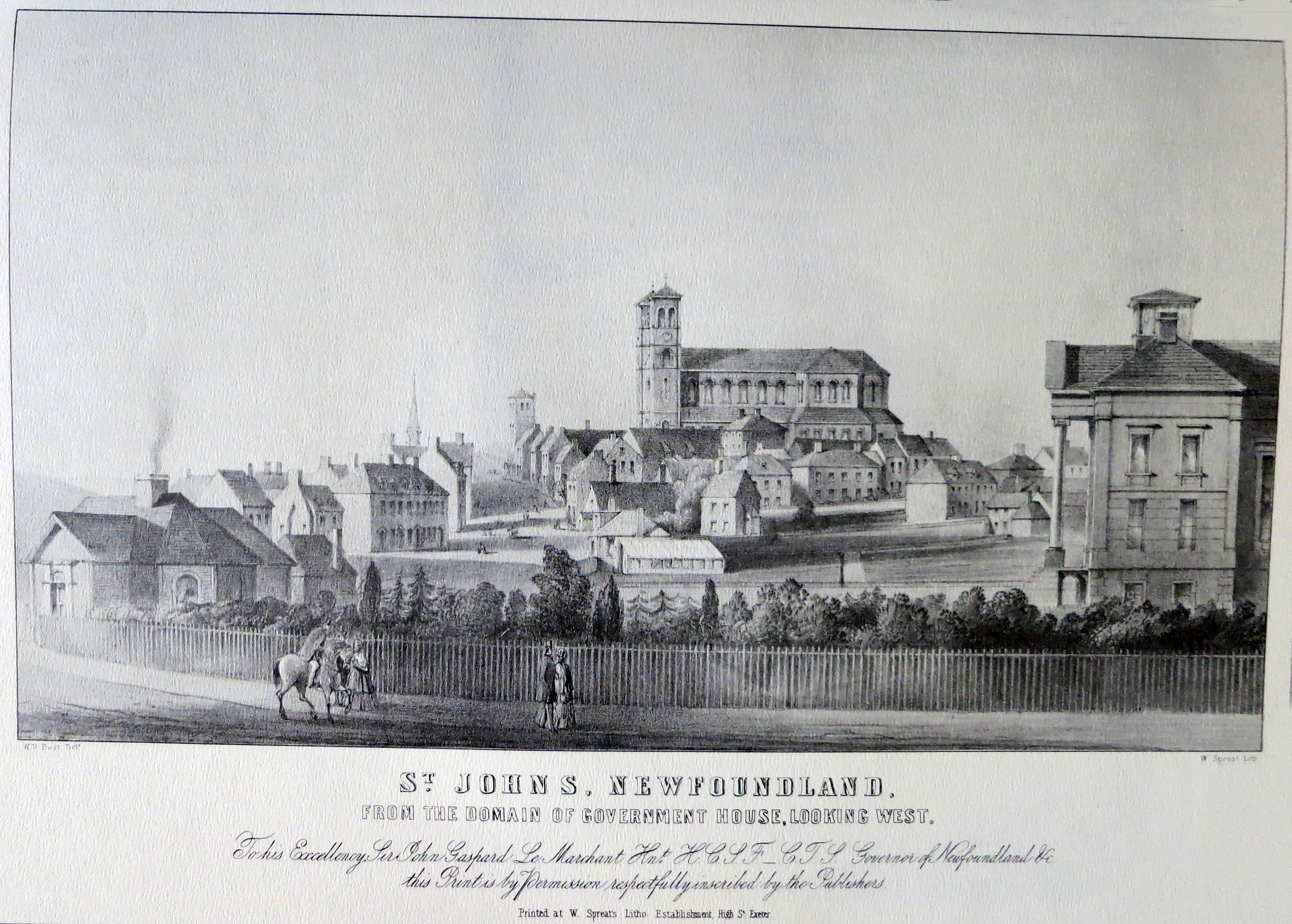
St. John's from Government House, with the basilica in the background, 1851. Work on the basilica was not completed until 1855.

Built between 1839 and 1855, the Basilica-Cathedral is located on the highest ridge overlooking the city of St. John's, Newfoundland and Labrador. The church is not oriented on an east–west axis, nor does it face toward the narrows that form the entrance to St. John's harbour, but rather, it was constructed on an orientation with its facade facing the line of the rising sun on the Winter Solstice, and the setting sun at the Summer Solstice, just as the medieval Chartres Cathedral is oriented on a solstitial axis.

The Basilica-Cathedral of St. John the Baptist is built in the form of a Latin cross and in the Lombard Romanesque style of a Roman basilica. It was designed for Bishop Michael Anthony Fleming by the architect of the Danish government, Ole Joergen Schmidt, resident at Altona on the Elbe (Hamburg) though Fleming also had some plans prepared by the distinguished Irish architect John Philpot Jones of Clonmel, County Tipperary, Ireland, and also consulted with James Murphy, a native of Dublin, Ireland, on plans for the cathedral. Construction was initially supervised by the Waterford contractor Michael McGrath, but later superintended by stonemason and sculptor James Purcell of Cork, Ireland, who also designed and built a small wooden church, Christchurch, at Quidi Vidi near St. John's.

Construction took place under the watchful eye of the Irish-born Bishop Michael Anthony Fleming, the Vicar-Apostolic and first Bishop of Newfoundland and later under the eye of his successor, Bishop John Thomas Mullock. The Basilica-Cathedral of St. John the Baptist is unusual among North America's 19th century public buildings in that it was constructed using limestone and granite imported from Galway and Dublin, Ireland, as well as 400,000 bricks from Hamburg, as well as local sandstone and Newfoundland bluestone quarried from St. John's and Kelly's Island in Conception Bay, giving the Cathedral its characteristic grey colour.

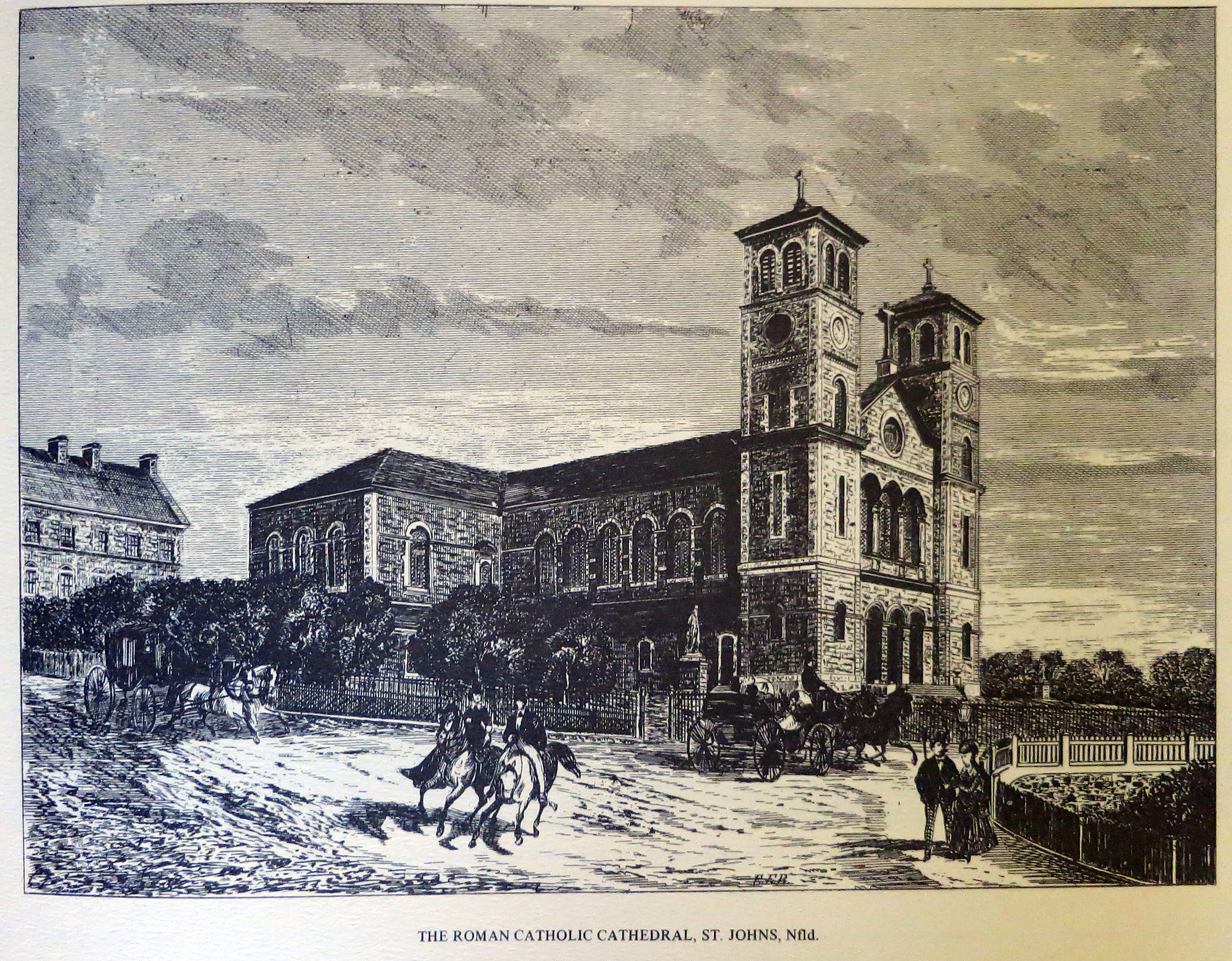
Depiction of the basilica in 1871

The St. John's Basilica-Cathedral was contemporary with and part of the great boom in church construction which surrounded the era of Daniel O'Connell and Catholic emancipation in Ireland and Newfoundland. For its day, the St. John's Basilica was the largest Irish cathedral anywhere outside Ireland. No other building of the Irish diaspora in North America can boast of such intimate influences from or upon Ireland, and no other building had such an international reputation in its day.

During its centenary celebration in 1955, Pope Pius XII raised the cathedral to the rank of minor Basilica. The Basilica was designated a National Historic Site of Canada in 1983, to recognize its architectural uniqueness as one of the earliest North American examples of the Romanesque revival style, and its central role as the spiritual and cultural home of Newfoundland Roman Catholics. The building has also been designated as a Registered Heritage Structure by the Heritage Foundation of Newfoundland and Labrador. Its builder, Michael Anthony Fleming, was designated a Person of National Historic Significance in 2005.

In 2021, Diocesan officials announced that the Basilica was among properties being assessed for potential sale to compensate men who were sexually abused at the former Mount Cashel Orphanage. In July 2022, the diocese and the Basilica Heritage Foundation, a non-profit consortium which has pledged to protect the historic properties, announced that the foundation would purchase the Basilica, along with several other adjacent properties. The Basilica will continue as the main Catholic church for the city.

== Architecture ==
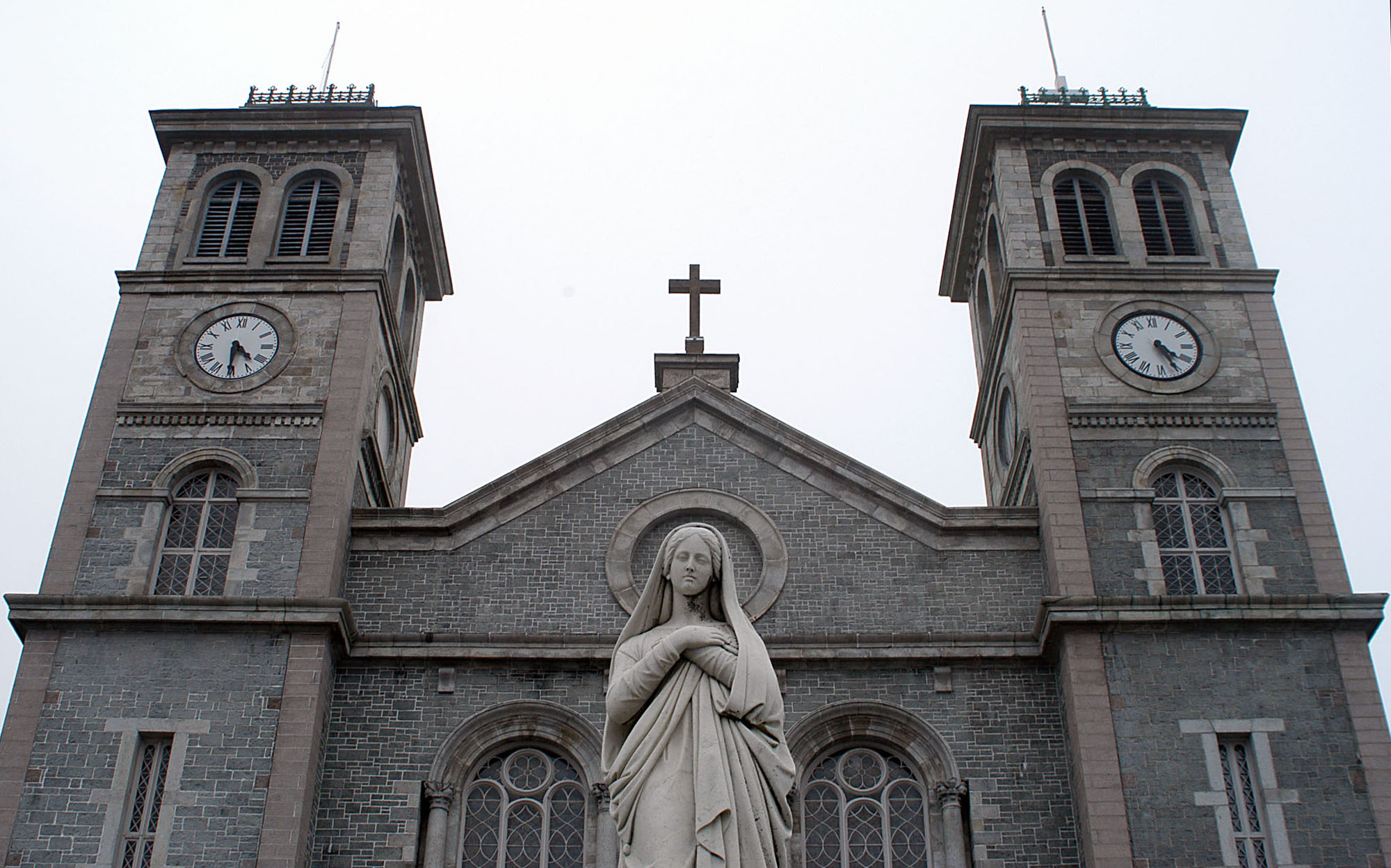
Grey limestone, and white granite was used to build the basilica

The Basilica-Cathedral is built in the Lombard Romanesque style, based on visual features typically associated with the churches of northern Italy. The building is built with grey limestone and white granite quarried in Galway and Dublin, Ireland and grey sandstone from St. John's and Kelly's Island, Conception Bay, Newfoundland. The exterior is 260 feet (79 m) long and 220 feet (67 m) wide; the two towers rise 150 feet (46 m) from street level. The total capacity of the Basilica is around 2,500 people, though during the visit of Pope John Paul II in September 1984, 3600 educators gathered in the Basilica-Cathedral to greet the Roman Pontiff. When completed in 1855, the Basilica-Cathedral of St. John The Baptist was the largest church building in North America.

The East Tower contains a single bell, the largest in the church. Called the St. John Bell, this two-ton bell was purchased by Bishop Mullock in February 1850. Cast by John Murphy of Dublin, it was the largest ever cast in Ireland at that time, and won a gold medal at the Dublin Exhibition of Irish Manufacturers. There are eight bells in the West Tower. The three largest bells were cast by Murphy in 1854 and 1857. The five smaller bells were cast in 1906 by Matthew O'Byrne of the Fountain Head Bell Foundry in Dublin, Ireland.

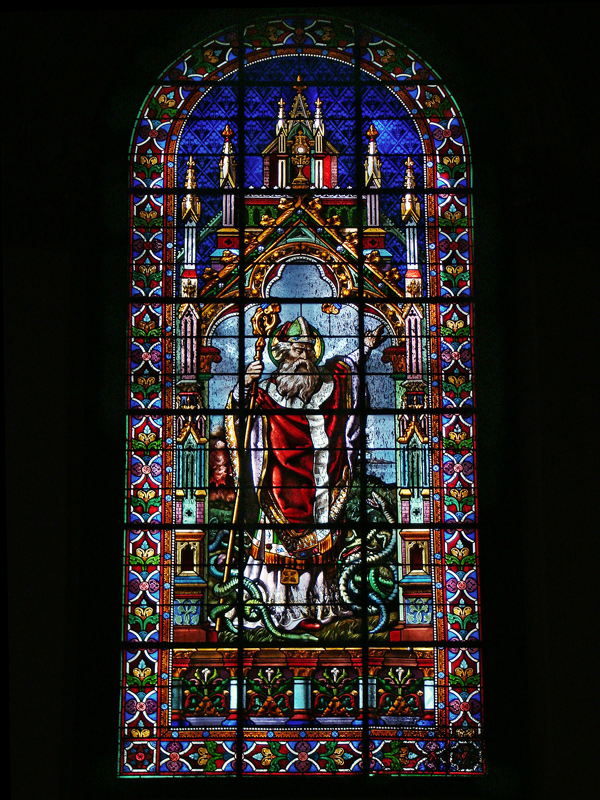
A stained glass window at the basilica

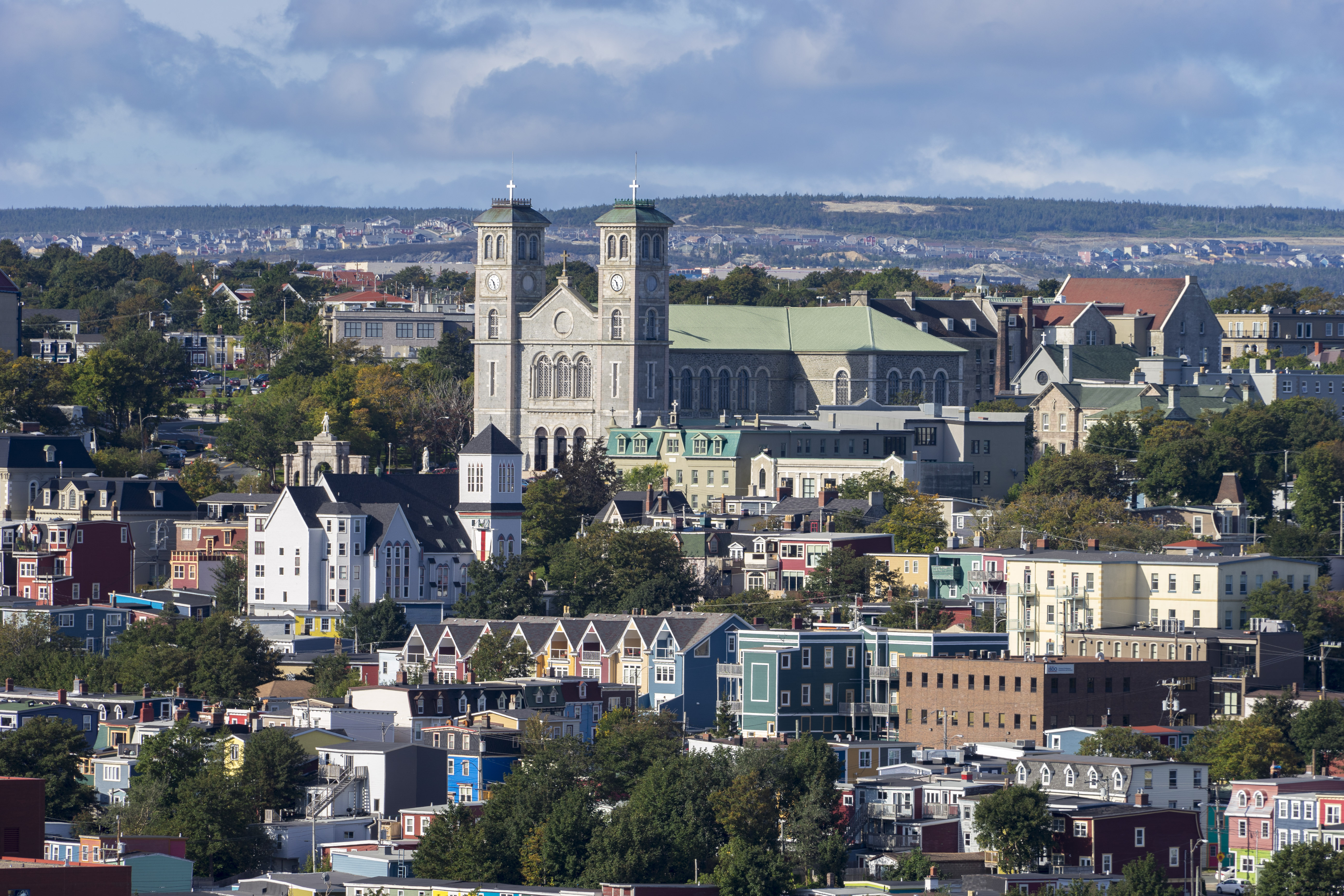
Location of the basilica in St John's

The Basilica-Cathedral contains twenty-eight stained glass windows which adorn the upper walls (clerestory) and are of English and French workmanship. The windows were the gifts of patrons and religious societies, such as the Society of the Holy Rosary and were installed between 1859 and 1905. The 35 stained glass windows in the ambulatory all date from 1954 to 1955 and were the work of Gerard Earley and Company of Dublin; they constitute the largest collection of mid-20th Century Irish Arts and Crafts style stained glass windows in one building in the western hemisphere.

=== Interior ===
The Altar of Sacrifice, which stands at the front of the Sanctuary, enshrines one of the most revered and important pieces of statuary in the Basilica, The Dead Christ, sculpted in Carrara marble by renowned Irish neoclassical sculptor John Hogan in 1854. Having seen earlier versions of this work by Hogan in Dublin and Cork, Bishop Fleming left funds and directions in his last will and testament that a "Dead Christ by Hogan" be purchased for the cathedral. Prior to coming to Newfoundland, Fleming's successor, Bishop Mullock, also had a version of the Hogan Dead Christ installed in his own chapel, the South Chapel {St. Finbar's} in Cork. Mullock commissioned this rendering of the work in 1854 and placed it beneath the table of the High Altar on 19 March 1855. The statue is Hogan's greatest masterpiece and is the final of three similar statues created by Hogan in the early 19th century and the only one located outside Ireland. The Basilica also features works by Ireland's most eminent expatriate sculptor, John Edward Carew, whose famous bas-relief The Death of Nelson is located on the plinth at Nelson's Column, Trafalgar Square, London.

Interior of the basilica

The Sacred Heart Altar and the Altar of the Immaculate Conception, located on the west and east sides of the High Altar in the Sanctuary, respectively, are constructed from the same Egyptian travertine that was used by Pope Gregory XVI, to decorate the high altar of the Basilica of St. Paul Outside the Walls in Rome. A small quantity of this stone remained in Rome and, of this, two portions were offered by the Pope to Bishop Mullock, who subsequently brought the stone to St. John's in 1856 to complete the interior of the Basilica.

In 1955, the parish installed a great pipe organ from the Casavant Frères firm of St-Hyacinthe, Québec and dedicated it in memory of the parishioners who died in World War I and World War II. The 66 stop organ with 4,050 pipes is the largest instrument in Newfoundland, and is one of the largest pipe organs east of Montreal.

== Basilica Museum ==
The Basilica Museum is open seasonally, and is located in the Episcopal Library attached to the Archbishop's Palace. Exhibits include religious art, historic and religious artifacts of the Basilica, pictures of bishops and archbishops of St. John's, and furniture and decorations of several period rooms in the Palace. Both the Episcopal Library and Archbishop's Palace are in their own rights National Historic Sites of Canada.

== Burials ==
- Buried in the crypt under the High Altar are:
- Archbishop of St. John's:
  - Edward Patrick Roche
- Bishop of St. John's:
  - Thomas Scallan
  - John T. Mullock
  - Thomas Joseph Power
  - Michael Anthony Fleming

== See also ==
- Architecture of St. John's
- Roman Catholic Archdiocese of St. John's, Newfoundland
- The Veiled Virgin
