= Enrico Carfagnini =

The Most Reverend Enrico Carfagnini, O.F.M.
- Titular Archbishop of Cius
- Diocese: Titular see of Cius
- Appointed: 24 March 1898
- Term ended: 12 February 1904
- Successor: Gaetano d’Alessandro
- Other posts: Bishop of Gallipoli (1880-1898); Bishop of Harbour Grace, Newfoundland (1870-1880); President, Saint Bonaventure's College

Orders
- Ordination: 12 February 1904
- Consecration: 22 May 1870 by Paul Cullen

Personal details
- Born: 23 March 1823 Aversa, Terra di Lavoro, Kingdom of the Two Sicilies
- Died: 2 December 1904 (aged 81) Aversa, Terra di Lavoro, Kingdom of Italy
- Denomination: Roman Catholic
- Motto: Tuta sunt

Enrico Carfagnini, O.F.M. (also known as Henry Carfagnini; 23 March 1823 – 2 December 1904) was an Italian Friar Minor and educator, who served as the Bishop of Harbour Grace, Newfoundland from 1870 to 1880. He was also Bishop of Gallipoli, Italy, from 1880 to 1898.

Cargagnini resigned his see in 1898 and was appointed the Titular archbishop of Cius.
