= List of Catholic dioceses in Canada =

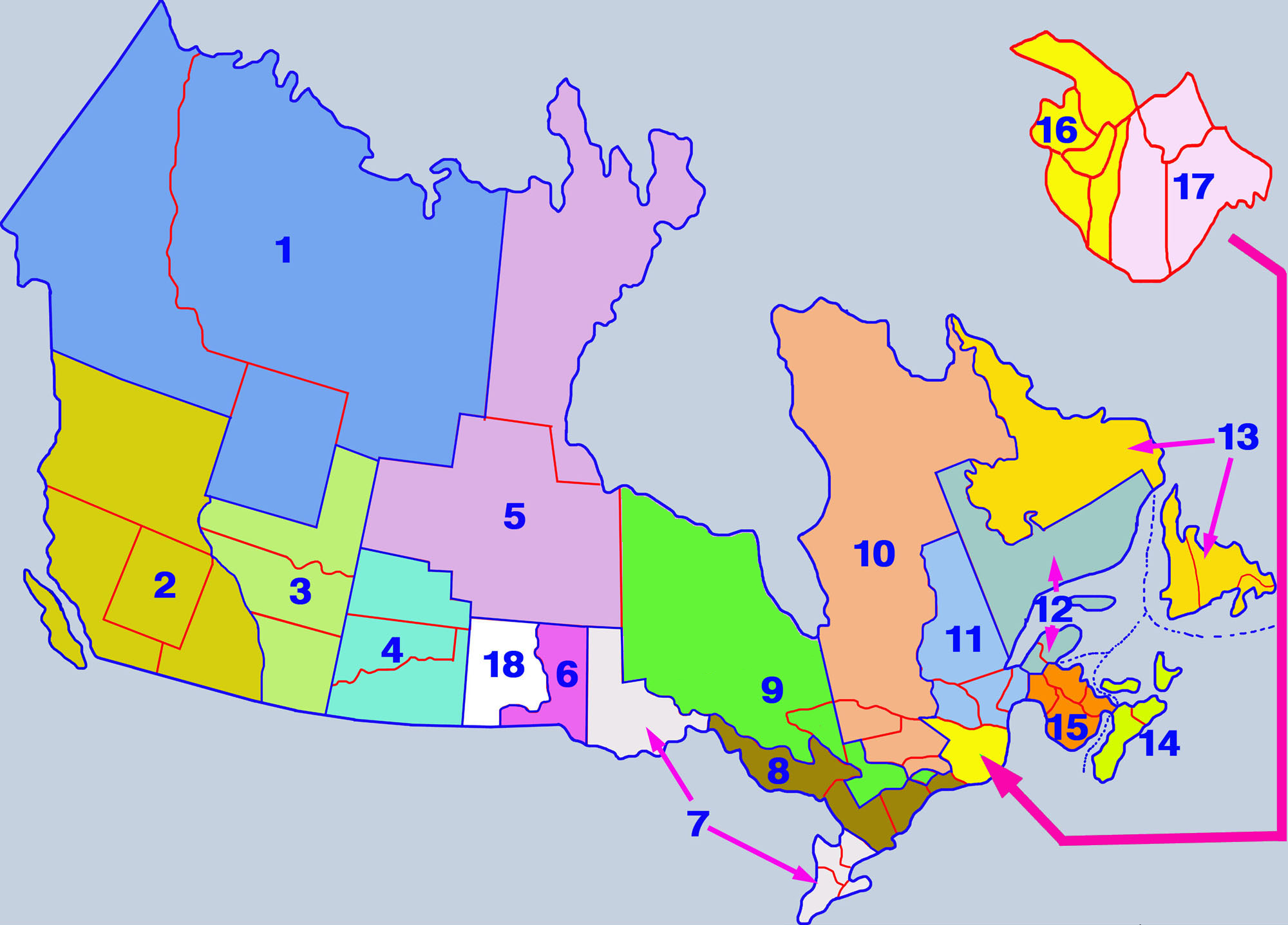
Ecclesiastical provinces and dioceses of the Catholic Church in Canada. Each color represents one of the 18 Latin Church provinces.

The Catholic Church in Canada comprises

- a Latin Church hierarchy, consisting of eighteen ecclesiastical provinces each headed by a metropolitan archbishop, with a total of 54 suffragan dioceses, each headed by a bishop, and a non-metropolitan archbishopric, plus a military ordinariate (including 14 auxiliary bishops, for a total of 79 bishops).
- a Ukrainian Catholic ecclesiastical province, comprising a metropolitan archeparchy and four suffragan eparchies
- six single jurisdictions for other Eastern Catholic Churches.

Those bishops all belong to the Canadian episcopal conference, the Canadian Conference of Catholic Bishops (C.C.C.B., HQ in national capital Ottawa).

Three Eastern Catholic churches have US-based North American jurisdictions covering Canada, as does the Latin Personal Ordinariate of the Chair of Saint Peter for former Anglicans headquartered in the US.

There also in an Apostolic Nunciature to Canada as papal diplomatic (embassy-level) representation.

== Current Latin Provinces and Dioceses ==
=== Latin sui iuris jurisdictions ===
The following particular churches are not suffragan to metropolitan sees, but are instead immediately subject to the Holy See:

- The Archdiocese of Winnipeg (not Metropolitan) is an independent Latin Church district, serving southwestern portions of Manitoba.
- The Military Ordinariate of Canada serves Canadian servicemen abroad and is not defined by geographical territory.
- The Personal Ordinariate of the Chair of Saint Peter serves Catholics of the Anglican Use in both Canada and the United States.

=== Ecclesiastical province of Edmonton ===
The province geographically consists of the majority of Alberta, except for the province's northwestern corner.

- Metropolitan Archdiocese of Edmonton
  - Diocese of Calgary
  - Diocese of Saint Paul

=== Ecclesiastical province of Gatineau ===
The province geographically consists of the western third of Quebec.

- Metropolitan Archdiocese of Gatineau
  - Diocese of Amos
  - Diocese of Rouyn-Noranda

=== Ecclesiastical province of Grouard–McLennan ===
The province geographically consists of the entirety of the Yukon and the Northwest Territories, plus the northwestern corner of Alberta, the western third of Nunavut, a northern portion of British Columbia north of 57 degrees latitude, and a tiny portion of northern Saskatchewan.

- Metropolitan Archdiocese of Grouard–McLennan
  - Diocese of Mackenzie–Fort Smith
  - Diocese of Whitehorse

=== Ecclesiastical province of Halifax–Yarmouth ===
The province is geographically conterminous with the provinces of Nova Scotia and Prince Edward Island.

- Metropolitan Archdiocese of Halifax–Yarmouth
  - Diocese of Antigonish
  - Diocese of Charlottetown

=== Ecclesiastical province of Keewatin–Le Pas ===
The province geographically consists of the northern half of Manitoba, the northern third of Saskatchewan, the eastern two-thirds of Nunavut, and a portion of northwestern Ontario.

- Metropolitan Archdiocese of Keewatin–Le Pas
  - Diocese of Churchill–Baie d'Hudson

=== Ecclesiastical province of Kingston ===
The province geographically consists of central and parts of eastern Ontario.

- Metropolitan Archdiocese of Kingston
  - Diocese of Peterborough
  - Diocese of Sault Sainte Marie

=== Ecclesiastical province of Moncton ===
The province is geographically coterminous with the province of New Brunswick.

- Metropolitan Archdiocese of Moncton
  - Diocese of Bathurst
  - Diocese of Edmundston
  - Diocese of Saint John

=== Ecclesiastical province of Montréal ===
The province geographically consists of south-central portions of Quebec.

- Metropolitan Archdiocese of Montréal
  - Diocese of Joliette
  - Diocese of Saint-Jean–Longueuil
  - Diocese of Saint-Jérôme–Mont-Laurier
  - Diocese of Valleyfield

=== Ecclesiastical province of Ottawa–Cornwall ===
The province geographically consists of northeastern and parts of eastern Ontario.

- Metropolitan Archdiocese of Ottawa–Cornwall
  - Diocese of Hearst–Moosonee
  - Diocese of Pembroke
  - Diocese of Timmins

=== Ecclesiastical province of Québec ===
The province geographically consists of north-central portions of Quebec.

- Metropolitan Archdiocese of Québec
  - Diocese of Chicoutimi
  - Diocese of Sainte-Anne-de-la-Pocatière
  - Diocese of Trois-Rivières

=== Ecclesiastical province of Regina ===
The province geographically consists of the southern two-thirds of Saskatchewan.

- Metropolitan Archdiocese of Regina
  - Diocese of Prince Albert
  - Diocese of Saskatoon

=== Ecclesiastical province of Rimouski ===
The province geographically consists of northeastern portions of Quebec.

- Metropolitan Archdiocese of Rimouski
  - Diocese of Baie-Comeau
  - Diocese of Gaspé

=== Ecclesiastical province of Saint Boniface ===
The province geographically consists of the southeastern portion of Manitoba.

- Archdiocese of Saint Boniface

=== Ecclesiastical province of St. John's ===
The province is geographically coterminous with the province of Newfoundland and Labrador.

- Metropolitan Archdiocese of St. John's
  - Diocese of Corner Brook and Labrador
  - Diocese of Grand Falls

=== Ecclesiastical province of Sherbrooke ===
The province geographically consists of portions of southeastern Quebec.

- Metropolitan Archdiocese of Sherbrooke
  - Diocese of Nicolet
  - Diocese of Saint-Hyacinthe

=== Ecclesiastical province of Toronto ===
The province geographically consists of southern and portions of northwestern Ontario.

- Metropolitan Archdiocese of Toronto
  - Diocese of Hamilton
  - Diocese of London
  - Diocese of Saint Catharines
  - Diocese of Thunder Bay

=== Ecclesiastical province of Vancouver ===
The province is geographically coterminous with the province of British Columbia except for the northernmost portion of B.C. north of 57 degrees latitude.

- Metropolitan Archdiocese of Vancouver
  - Diocese of Kamloops
  - Diocese of Nelson
  - Diocese of Prince George
  - Diocese of Victoria

== Current Eastern Catholic province and dioceses ==
These belong to particular churches sui iuris, which use a non-Latin rite (Byzantine or other) but are in full communion with Rome and the entirety of the Catholic Church, yet have their own patriarch or other hierarch directly under Rome

=== Metropolia of Winnipeg (Ukrainian Catholic) ===
The Ukrainian Greek Catholic Church in Canada, a particular church, using the Byzantine Rite in both the Ukrainian language and local vernacular, is organized into a metropolia (or ecclesiastical province) consisting of a metropolitan archeparchy (archdiocese) and its four suffragan eparchies (dioceses) :

- Metropolitan Archeparchy of Winnipeg
  - Eparchy of Edmonton
  - Eparchy of New Westminster
  - Eparchy of Saskatoon
  - Eparchy of Toronto and Eastern Canada

=== Other Eastern Catholic dioceses in Canada ===
- Chaldean Catholic Eparchy of Mar Addai of Toronto, part of the Chaldean Catholic Church
- Maronite Catholic Eparchy of Saint Maron of Montreal, part of the Maronite Church
- Melkite Greek Catholic Eparchy of Saint-Sauveur of Montréal, part of the Melkite Greek Catholic Church
- Syro-Malabar Catholic Eparchy of Mississauga, part of the Syro-Malabar Catholic Church
- Syriac Catholic Apostolic Exarchate of Canada, part of the Syriac Catholic Church
- Slovak Catholic Exarchate of Saints Cyril and Methodius of Toronto, part of the Byzantine Catholic Metropolis of Pittsburgh, USA (formerly part of the Slovak Greek Catholic Church).

=== International Eastern Catholic jurisdictions ===
Several Eastern Catholic Churches have jurisdictions that include members and congregations in both the United States and Canada:

- Armenian Catholic Eparchy of Our Lady of Nareg in Glendale, part of the Armenian Catholic Church
- Syro-Malankara Catholic Eparchy of the United States of America and Canada, part of the Syro-Malankara Catholic Church
- Romanian Greek Catholic Eparchy of St. George, part of the Romanian Greek Catholic Church

== Former jurisdictions ==
=== Titular see ===
- Diocese of Gravelbourg

=== Other suppressed jurisdictions ===
Nearly all other former jurisdictions have direct successors, usually after promotion, except :

- Apostolic Prefecture of Placentia, suppressed (merged into Diocese of St. John’s, Newfoundland)
- Territorial Abbacy of Saint Peter–Muenster, suppressed (merged into Diocese of Saskatoon)
- Diocese of Labrador City–Schefferville, suppressed (merged into Diocese of Amos, Diocese of Baie-Comeau and Diocese of Corner Brook and Labrador)
- Diocese of Harbour Grace, suppressed (merged into Diocese of Grand Falls)
- Diocese of Moosonee, suppressed (merged with the Diocese of Hearst, to create the new Diocese of Hearst–Moosonee)
- Diocese of Yarmouth, suppressed (merged into Metropolitan Archdiocese of Halifax, which simultaneously became Metropolitan Archdiocese of Halifax–Yarmouth)
- Diocese of Alexandria-Cornwall, suppressed (merged into Metropolitan Archdiocese of Ottawa, which simultaneously became Metropolitan Archdiocese of Ottawa-Cornwall)
- Diocese of St. George's, suppressed (merged into Diocese of Corner Brook and Labrador)

== Gallery of Archdiocesan sees ==
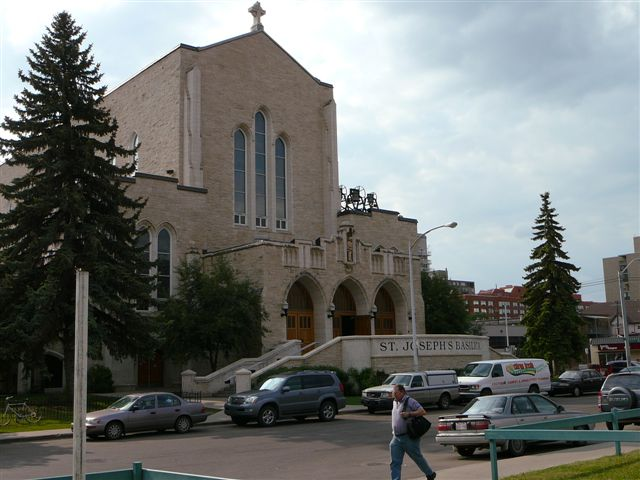
The seat of the Archdiocese of Edmonton is St. Joseph's Basilica.

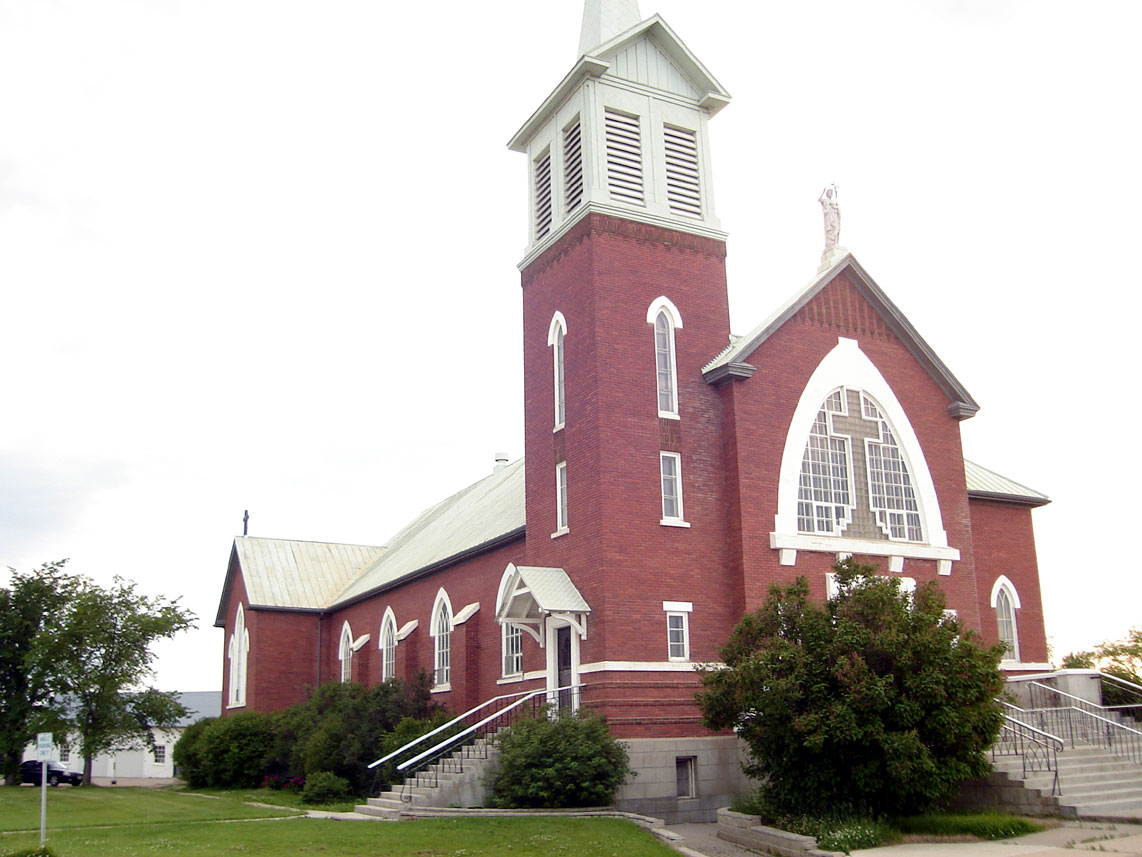
The seat of the Archdiocese of Grouard–McLennan is Cathedral of Saint John the Baptist.

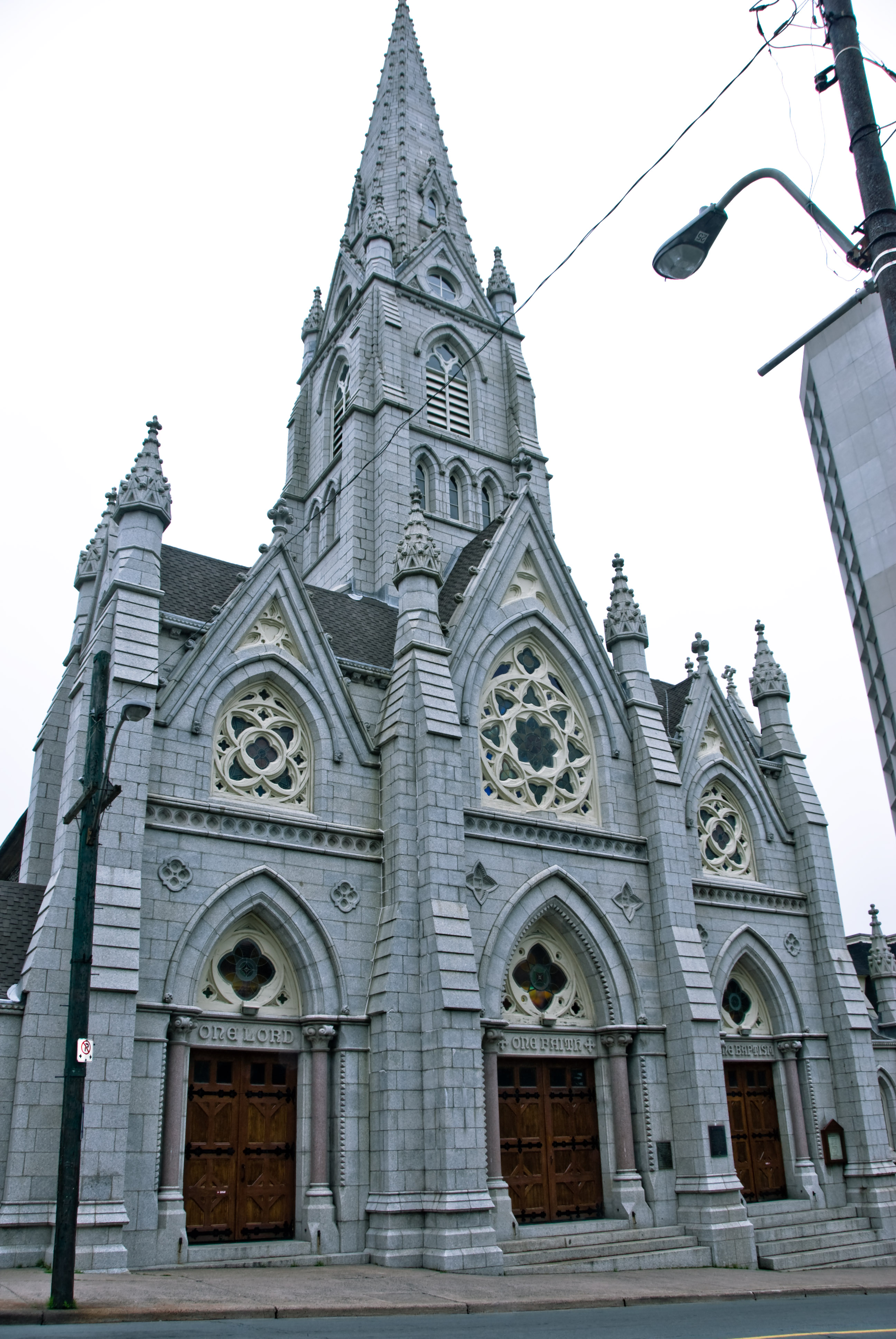
The seat of the Archdiocese of Halifax-Yarmouth is St. Mary's Basilica.

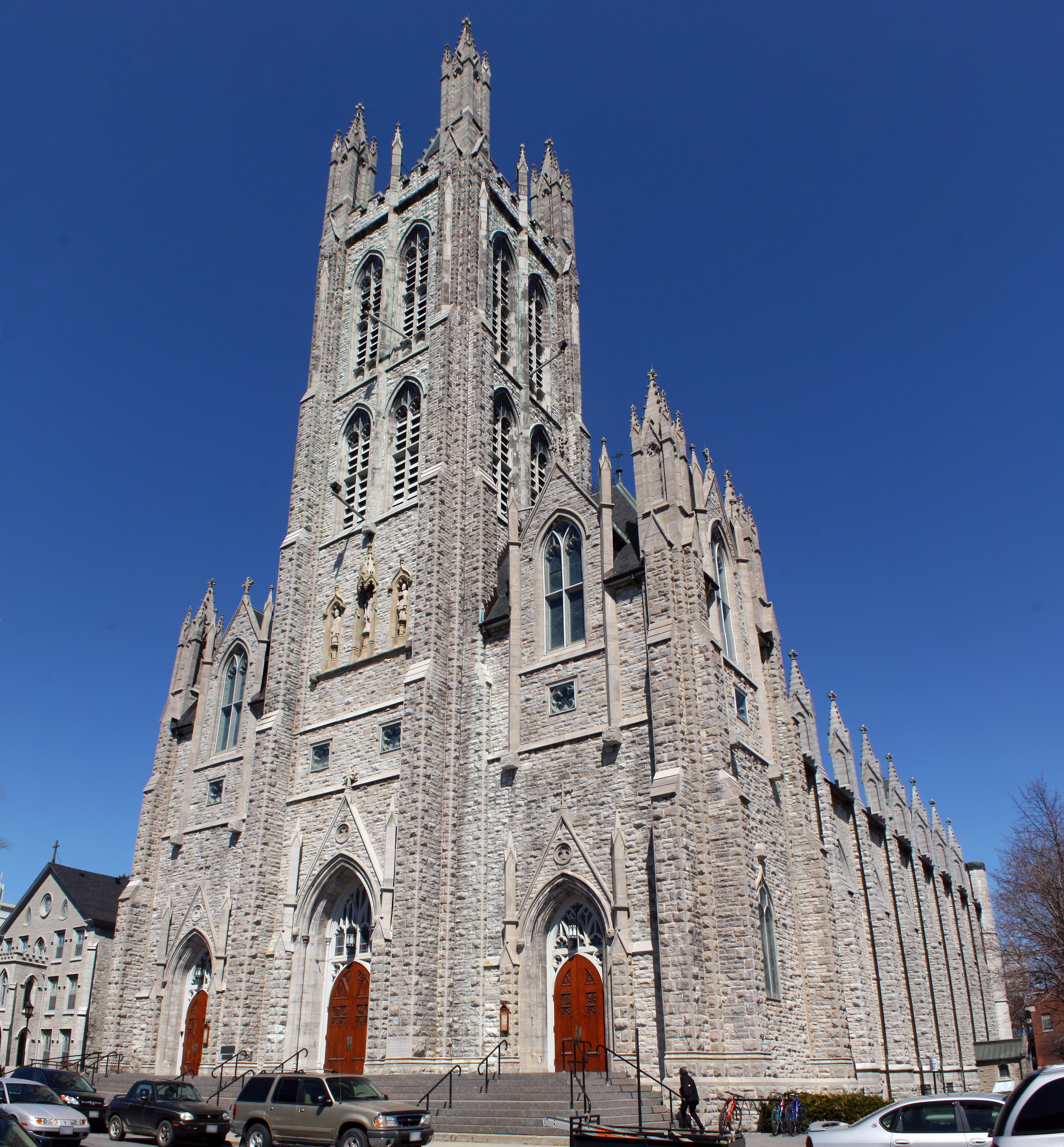
The seat of the Archdiocese of Kingston is St. Mary's Cathedral.

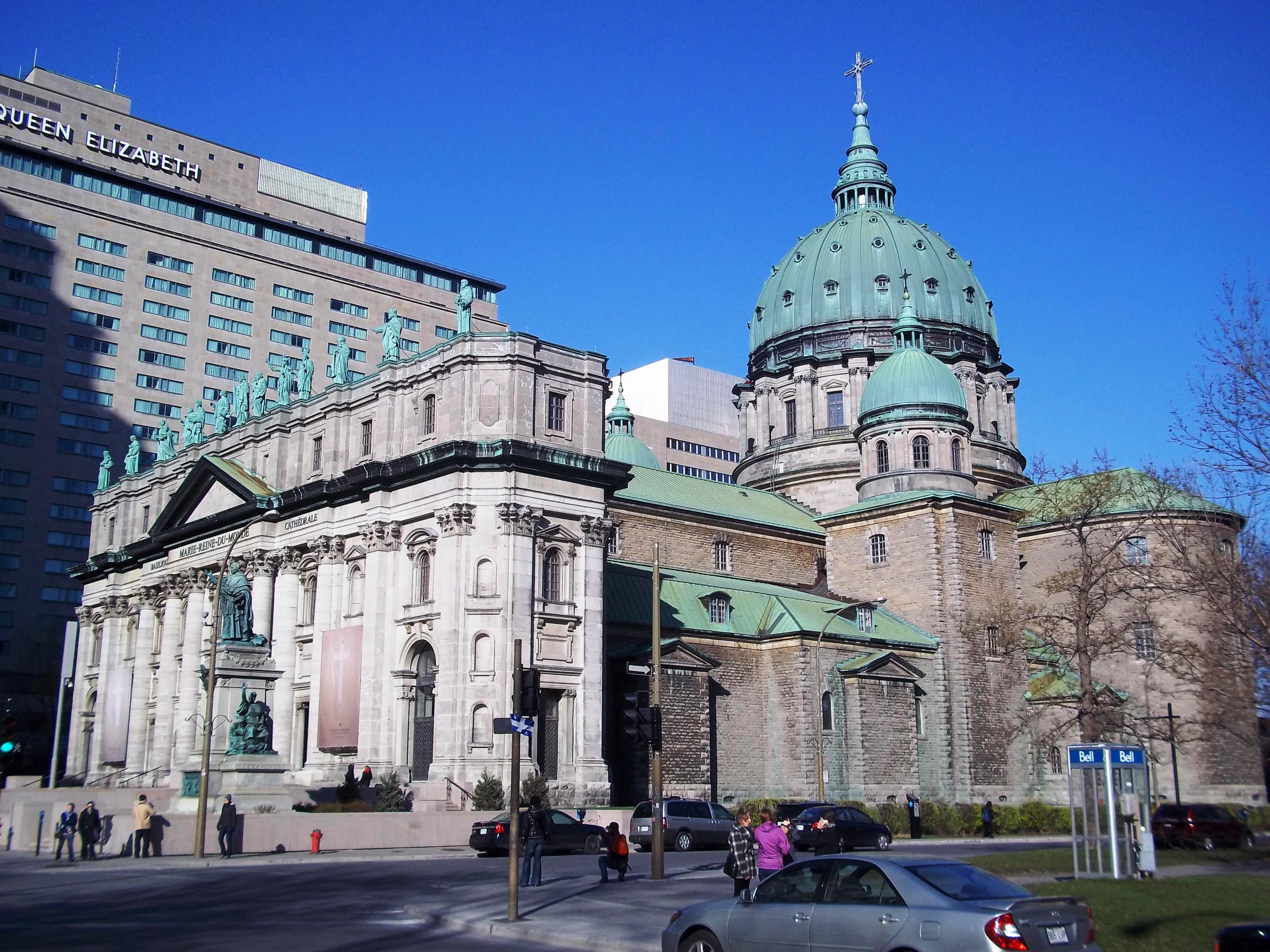
The seat of the Archdiocese of Montreal is Mary, Queen of the World Cathedral.

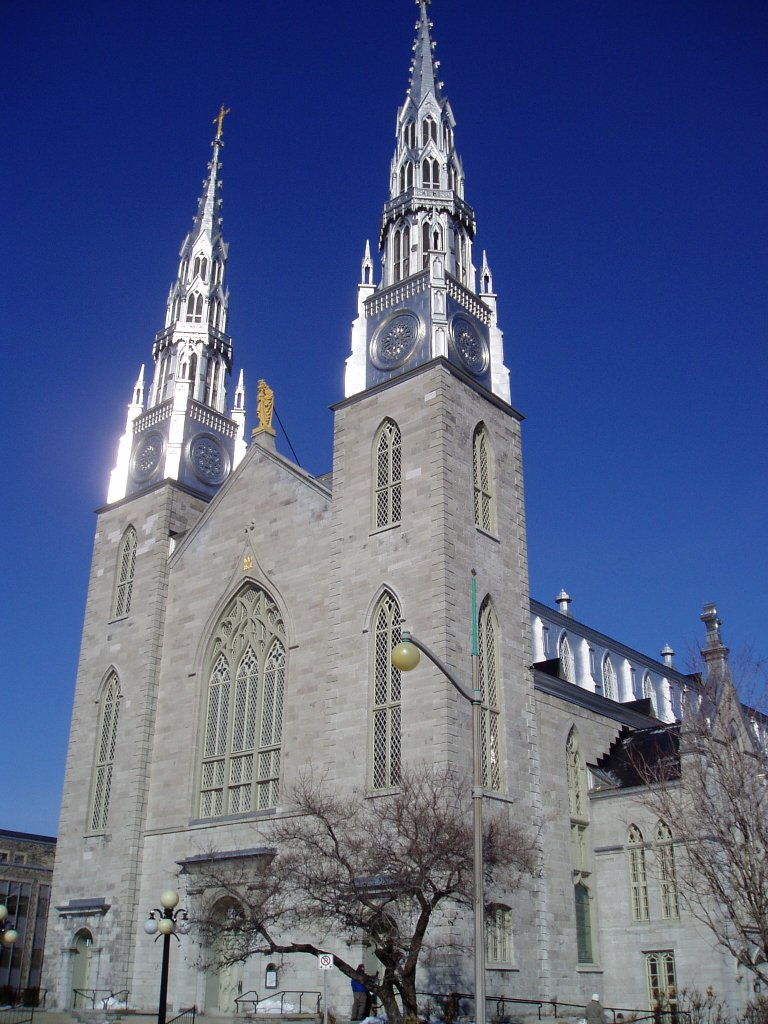
The seat of the Archdiocese of Ottawa is Notre-Dame Cathedral Basilica.

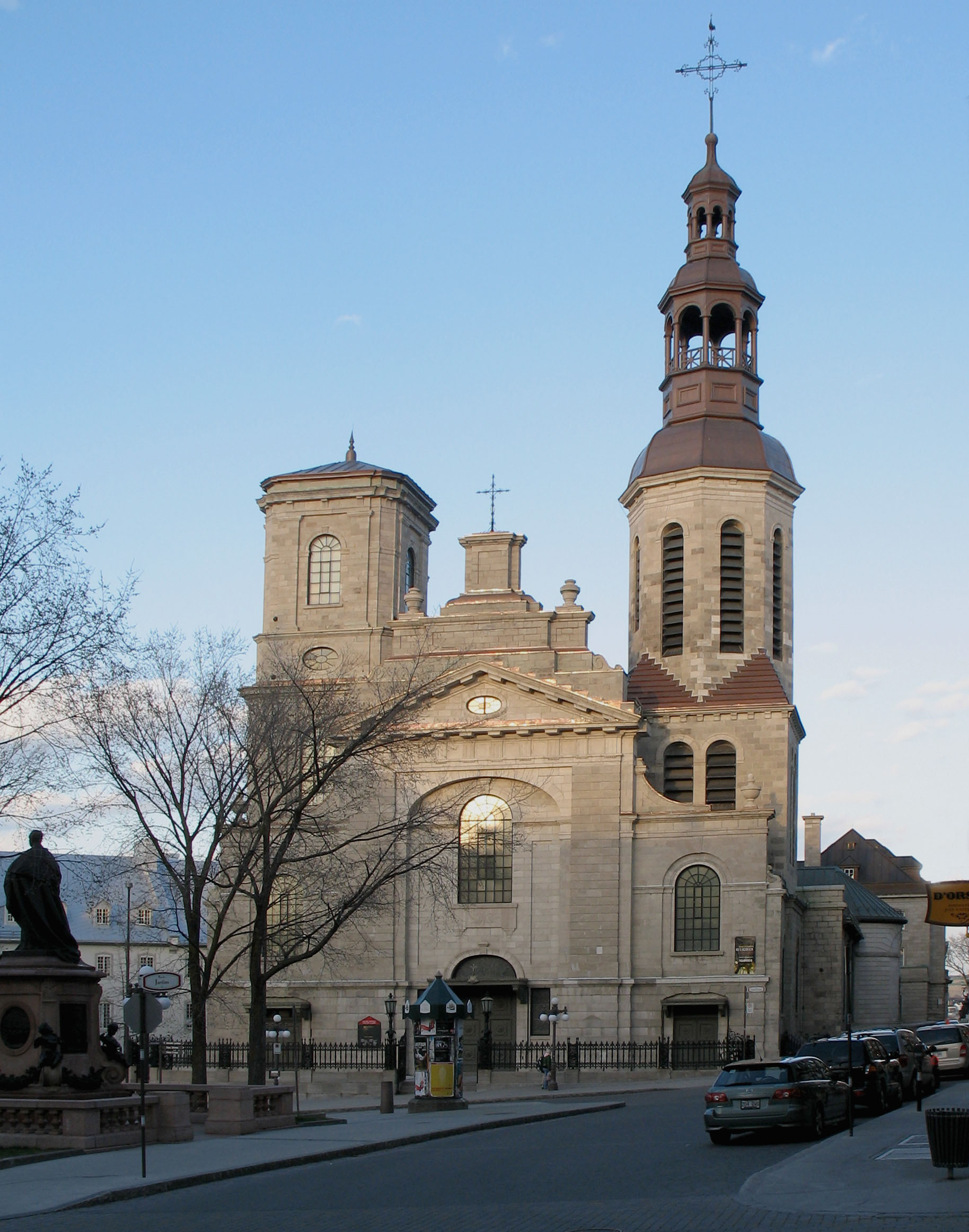
The seat of the Archdiocese of Quebec is Notre-Dame Basilica-Cathedral.

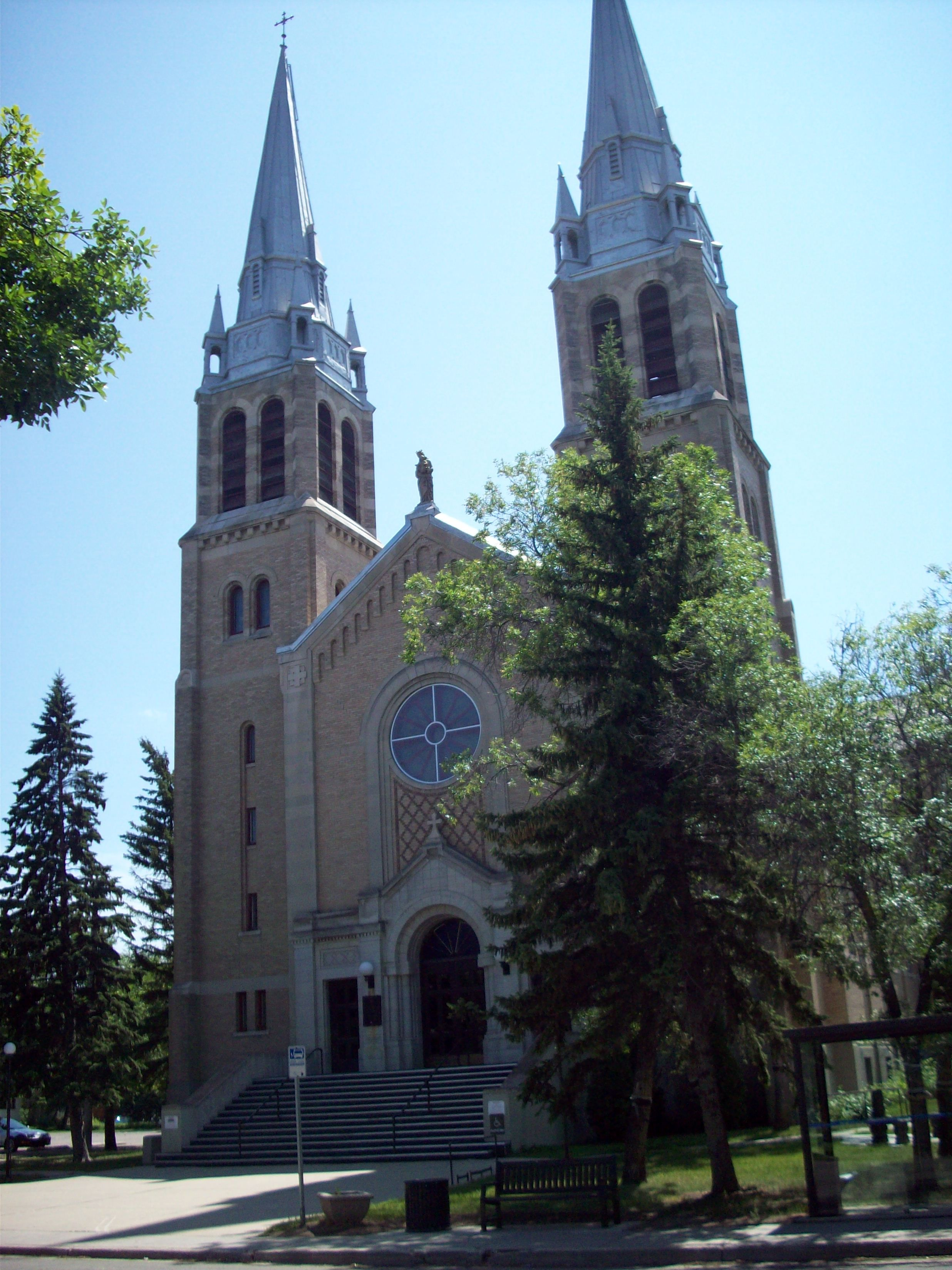
The seat of the Archdiocese of Regina is Holy Rosary Cathedral.

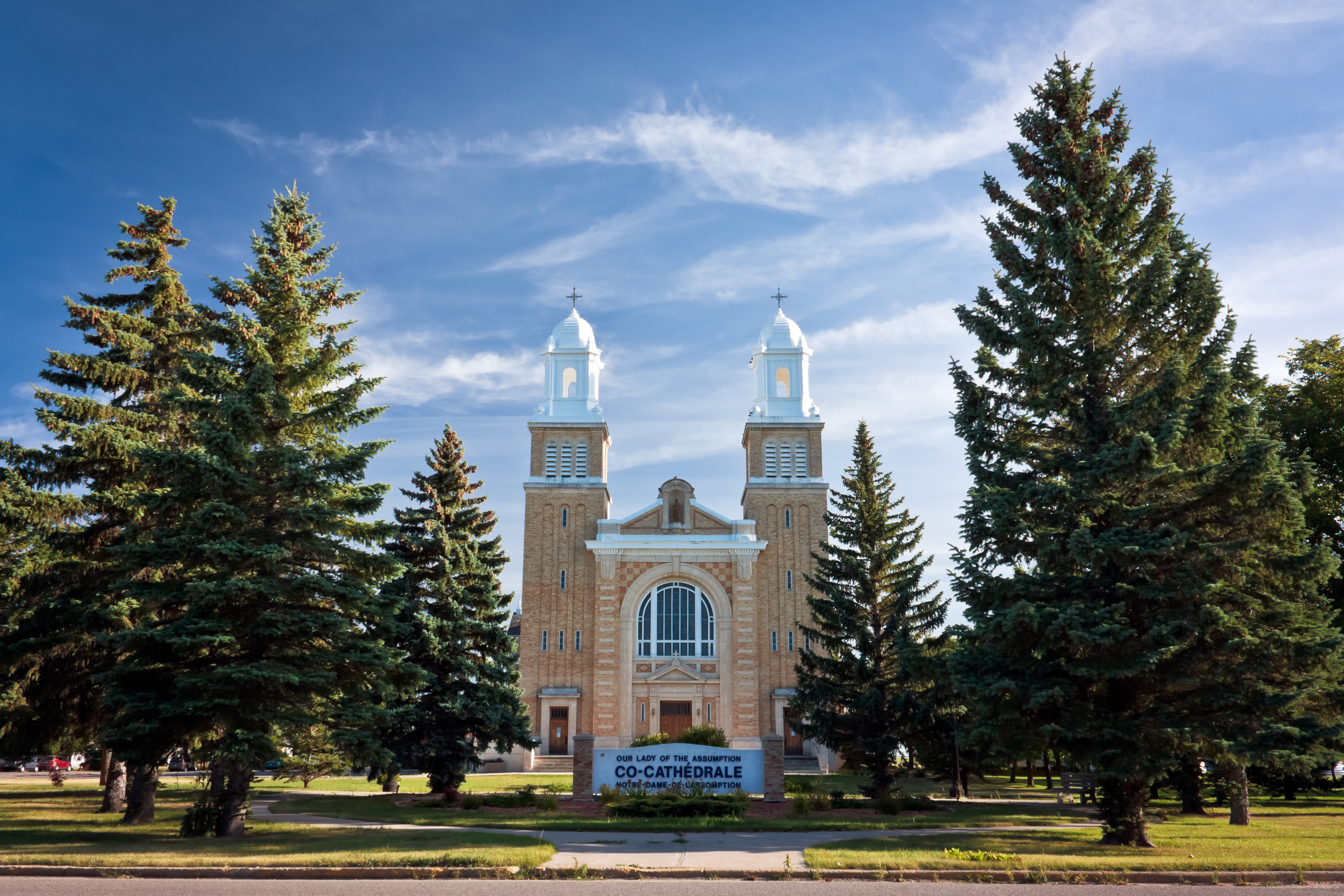
The co-seat of the Archdiocese of Regina is Our Lady of Assumption Co-Cathedral.

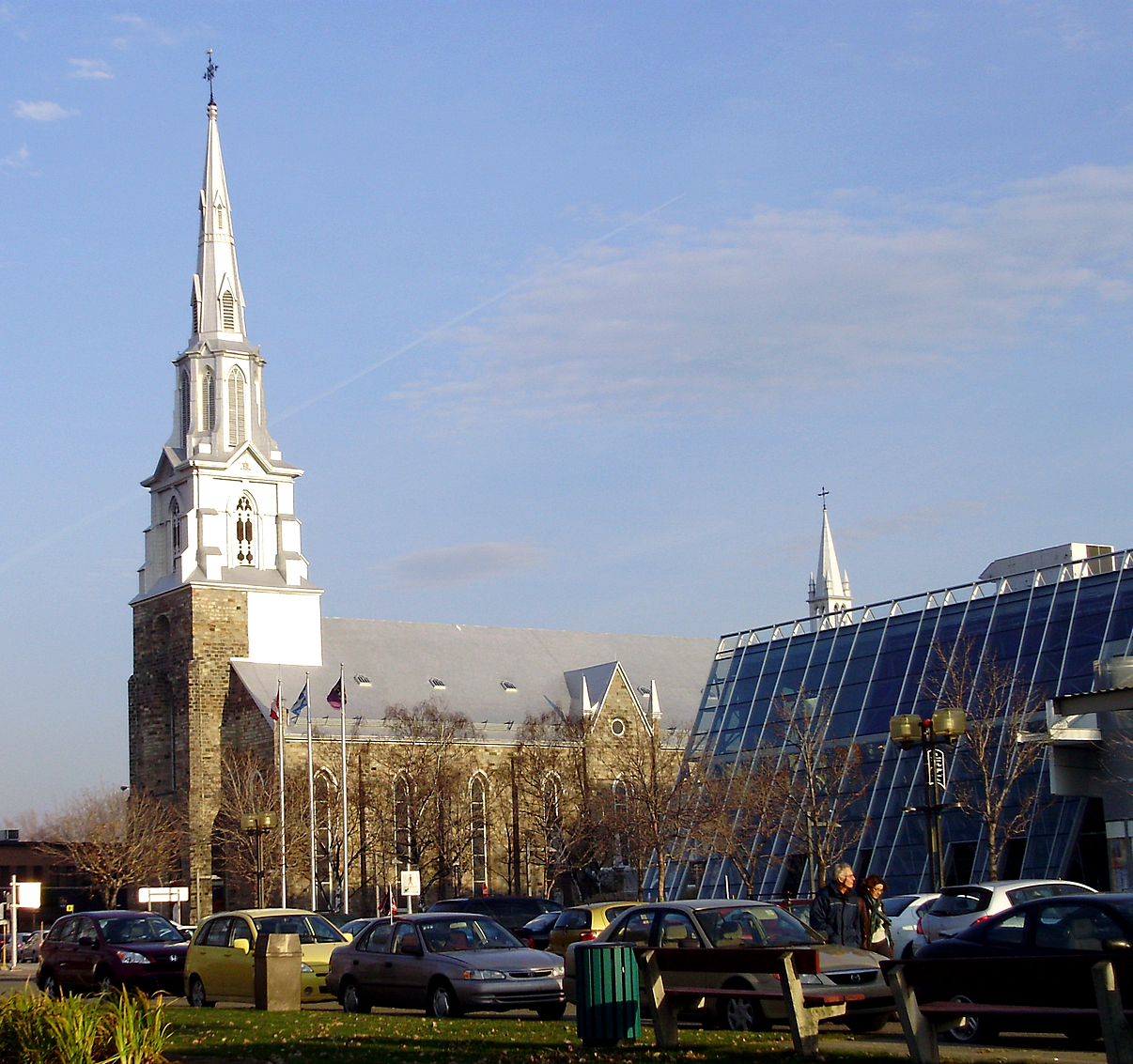
The seat of the Archdiocese of Rimouski is Saint-Germain Cathedral.

The seat of the Archdiocese of Saint Boniface is St. Boniface Cathedral.

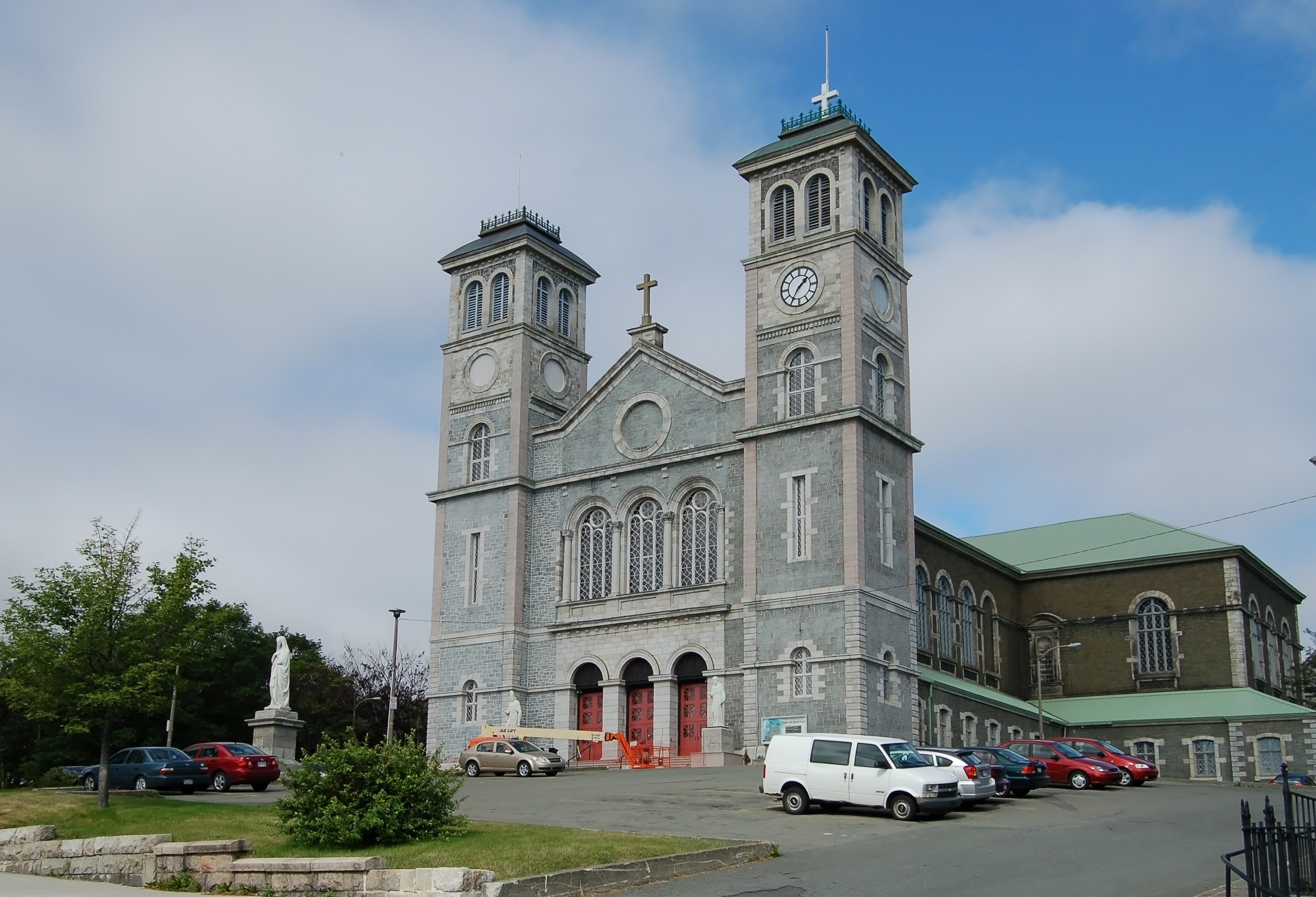
The seat of the Archdiocese of St. John's is Basilica of St. John the Baptist.

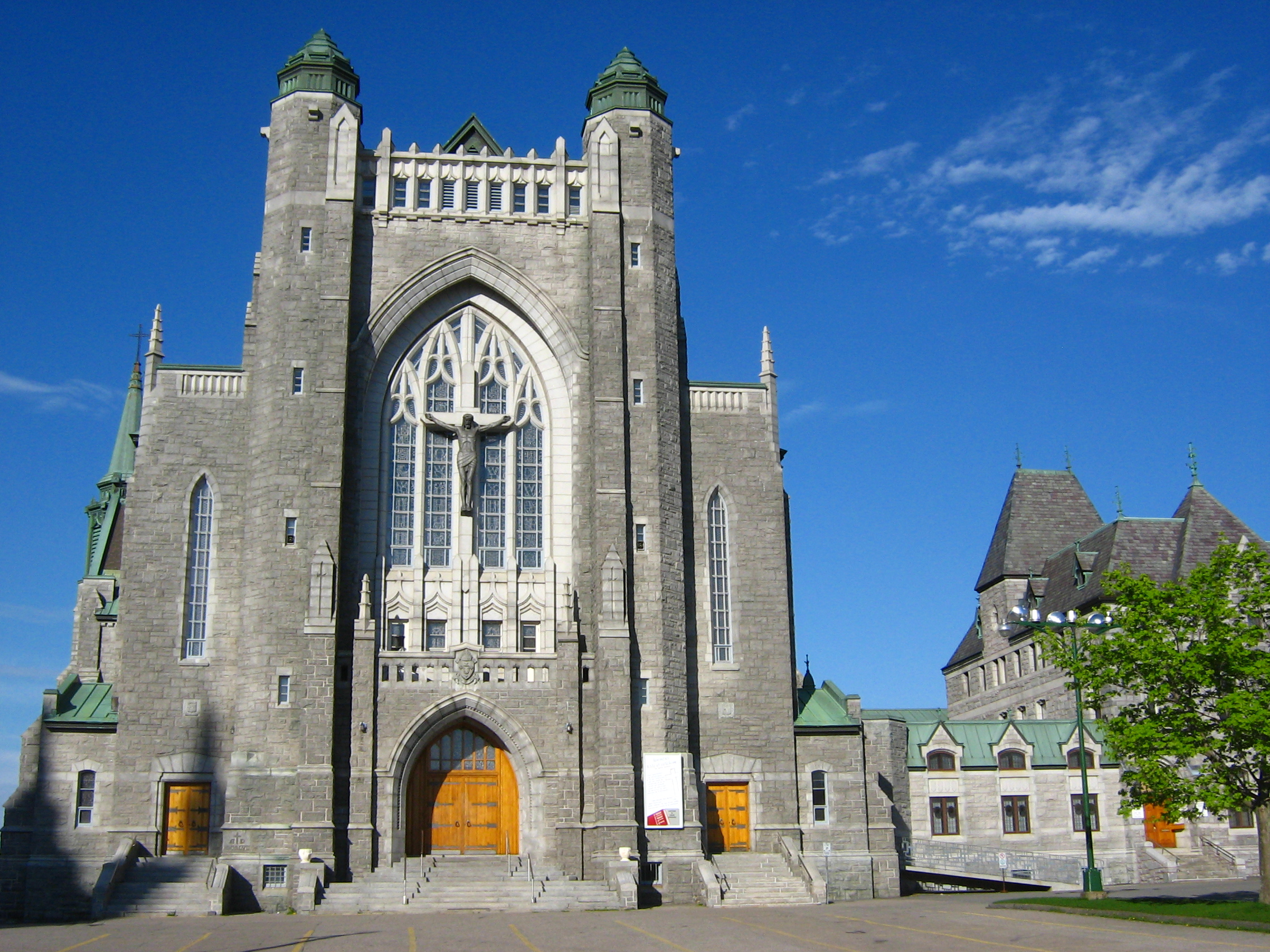
The seat of the Archdiocese of Sherbrooke is Saint-Michel Basilica-Cathedral.

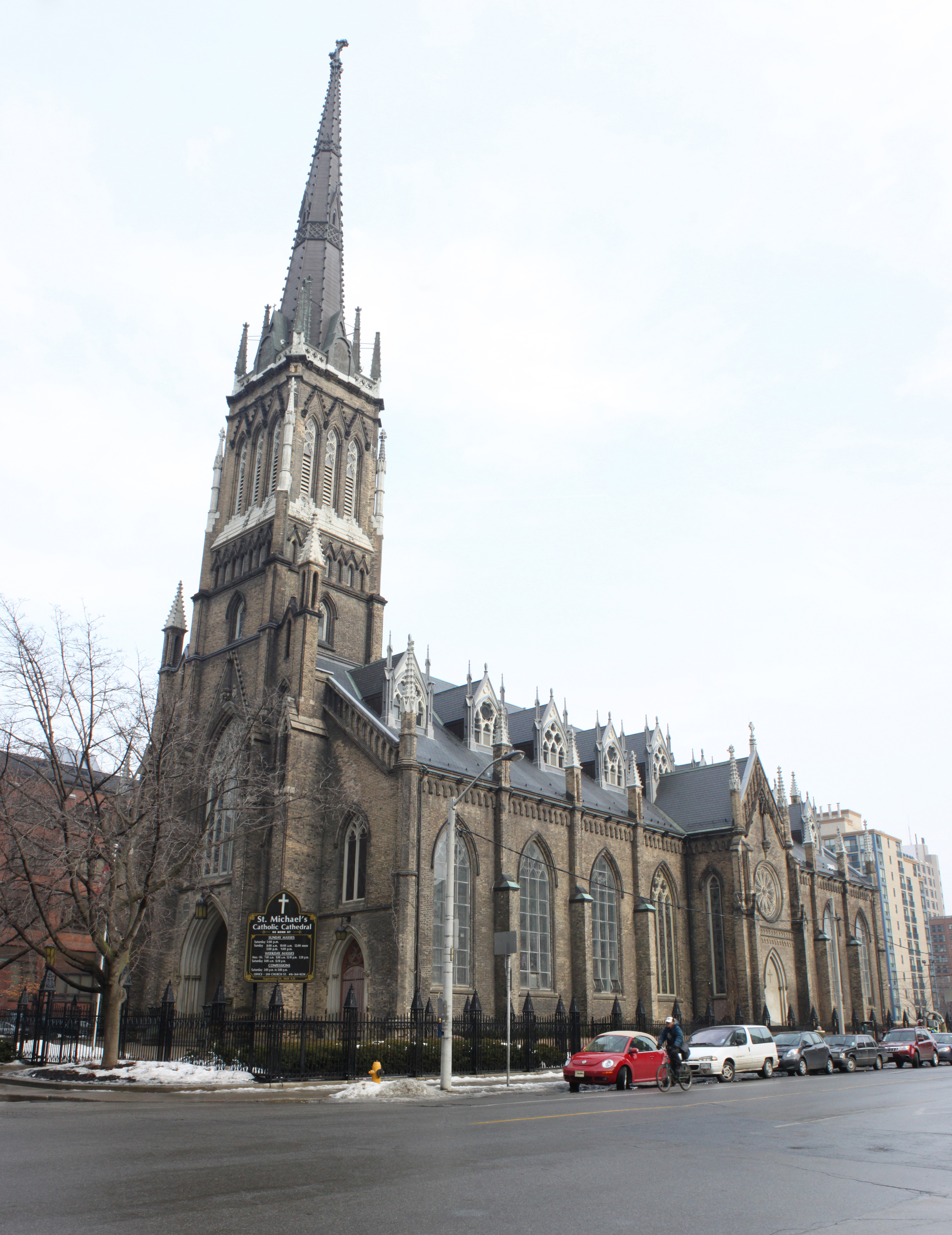
The seat of the Archdiocese of Toronto is St. Michael's Cathedral Basilica.

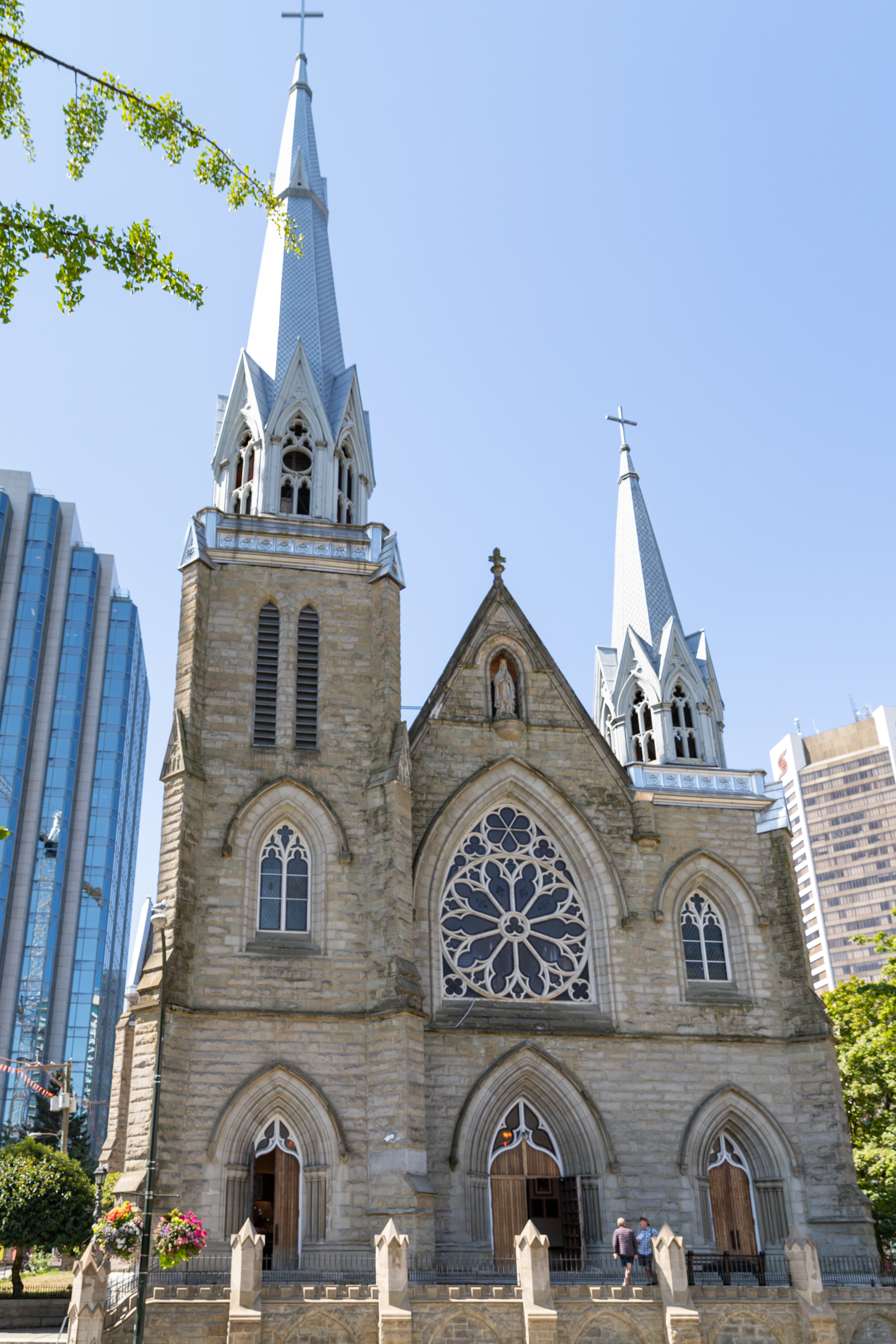
The seat of the Archdiocese of Vancouver is Holy Rosary Cathedral.

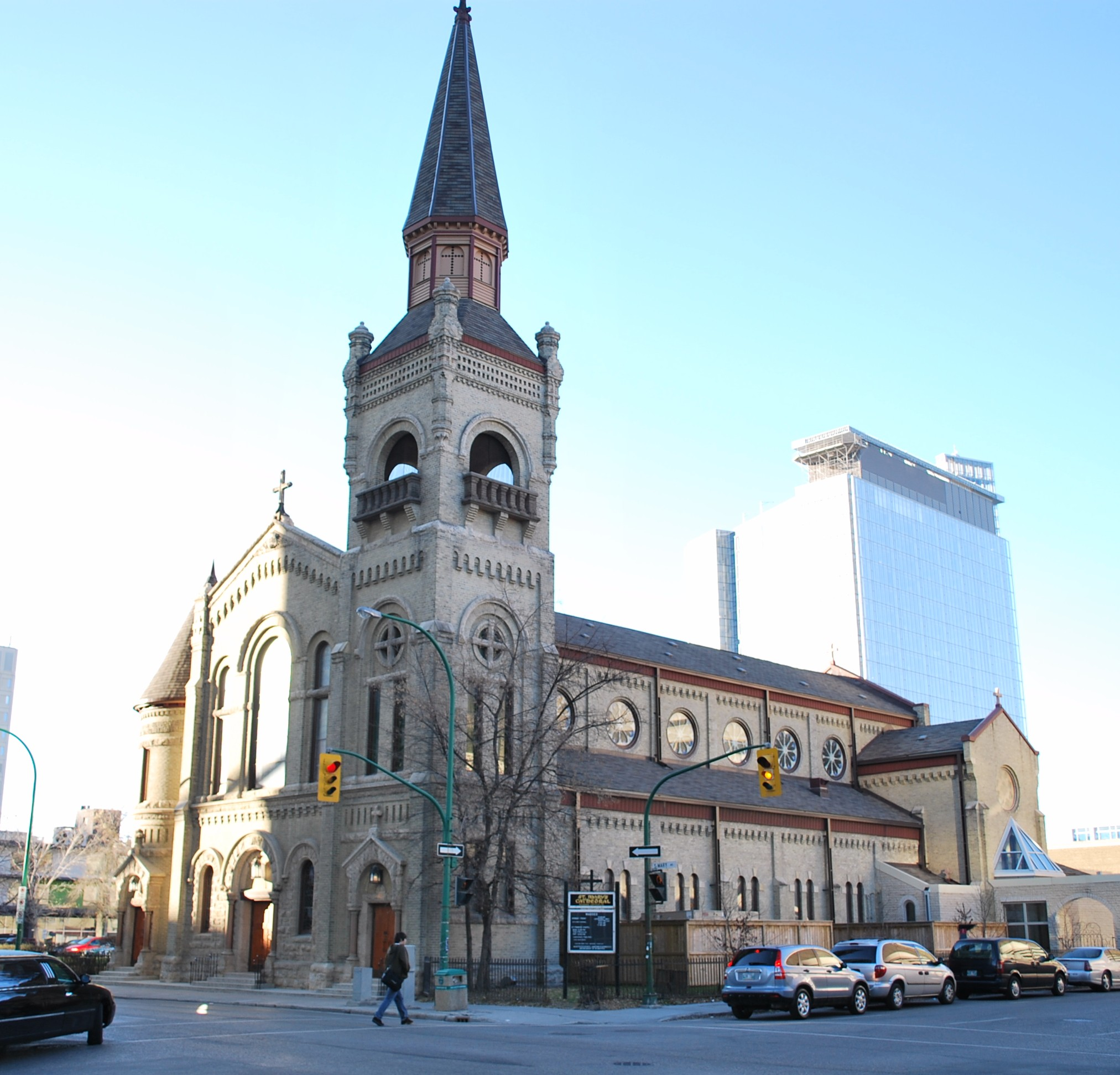
The seat of the Archdiocese of Winnipeg is St. Mary's Cathedral.

== See also ==
- Canadian Conference of Catholic Bishops
- Catholic Church in Canada
- List of Catholic dioceses (structured view)
- List of dioceses of the Anglican Church of Canada

== Sources and external links ==
- GCatholic.org - data for all sections
- Catholic-Hierarchy entry
- CanadaMassTimes.org
