= St. Joseph's Basilica (Edmonton) =

Catholic cathedral in Alberta, Canada

- Basilica Cathedral of Saint Joseph
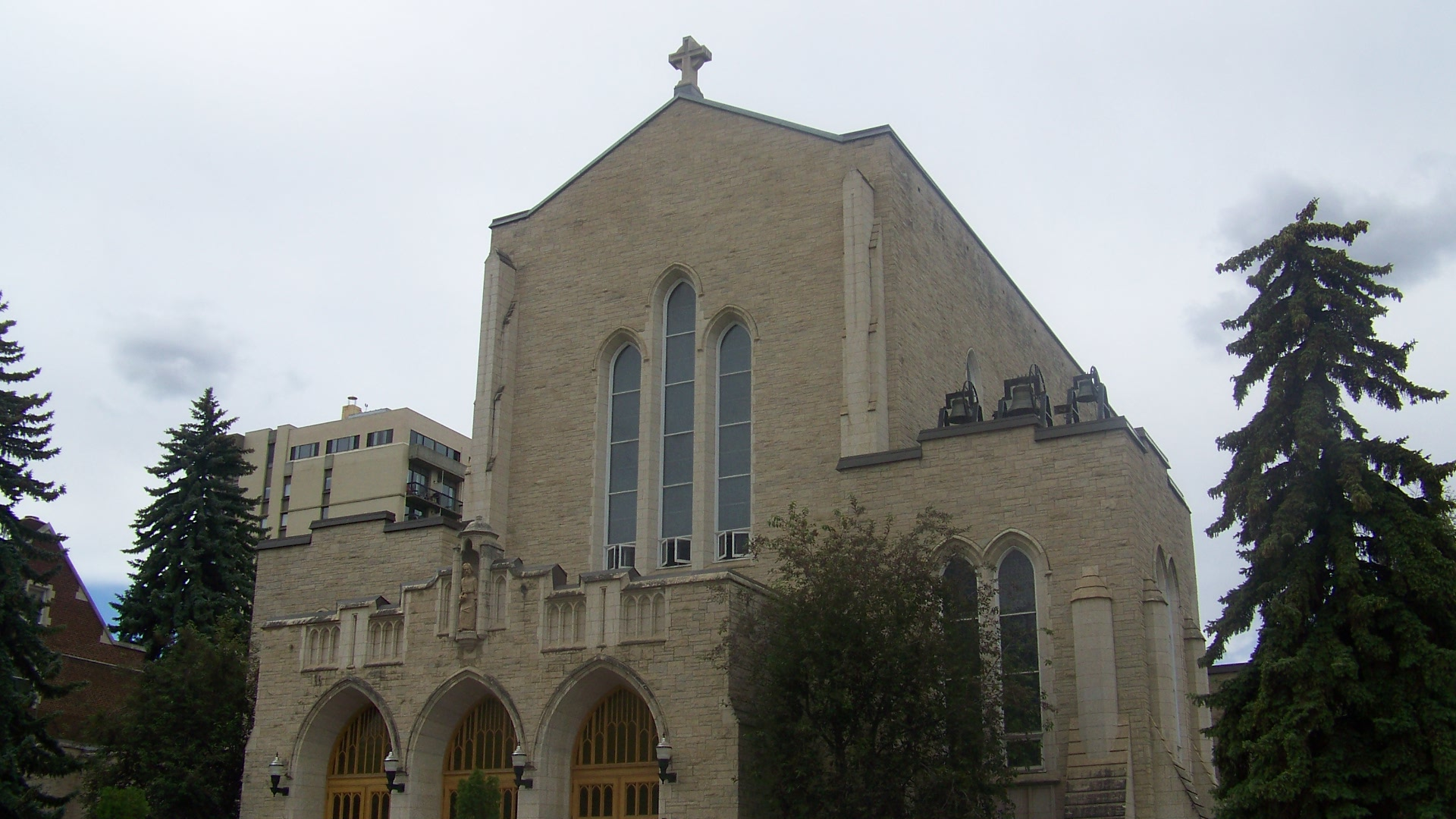
- The east facade of St. Joseph's.

- Location of St. Joseph's in Edmonton.
- 53.539759°N 113.515947°W
- Location: 10044 113 Street NW; Edmonton, Alberta; T5K 1N8
- Country: Canada
- Denomination: Catholic Church
- Sui iuris church: Latin Church
- Website: stjosephbasilica.com

History
- Former name: St. Joseph's Cathedral
- Status: Cathedral, minor basilica
- Founded: 1913
- Dedication: Saint Joseph
- Dedicated: 1917

Architecture
- Functional status: Operational
- Heritage designation: none
- Groundbreaking: 1913
- Completed: 1963

Specifications
- Capacity: 1200

Administration
- Archdiocese: Edmonton
- Parish: St. Joseph's

The Cathedral Basilica of Saint Joseph is a Catholic minor basilica in Edmonton, Alberta, Canada. The basilica, located west of downtown Edmonton is the cathedral of the Archdiocese of Edmonton and is the second-largest church in Edmonton. St. Joseph, which seats about 1,100 people, is the only minor basilica in Western Canada.

Pope John Paul II raised the shrine to the status of Minor Basilica via his decree Pro Explorato Quidem on the 15 May 1984. The decree was signed and notarized by Cardinal Agostino Casaroli.

Of architectural note are the 60 stained glass windows depicting the Twelve Apostles, Old Testament characters, scenes from the Bible, and from the church's connection to St. Albert, the first diocese in Alberta. Today, St. Joseph's Basilica is the seat of the Roman Catholic Archdiocese of Edmonton. As the seat of the archdiocese, it is the church of the archbishop.

== History ==
The history of St. Joseph's began in 1913. At the time the city's main Franco-Albertan church, St. Joachim’s, was no longer able to cope with the booming population of English speaking parishioners. A large basement was excavated and concrete was poured. The church functioned as a crypt church from this time until the building was finally completed in 1963. In 1917, St. Joseph's Parish came into being by a separation of the English and the French parishioners of St. Joachim.

Construction of the church was halted until 1924 due to World War I (the cathedral's architect, Roland Walter Lines, was killed serving in the conflict). In 1917, St. Joseph's became a separate parish when the English speaking and French speaking parishioners at St. Joachim’s were given their own parishes. The French speakers remained at St. Joachim's. The English speakers moved to St. Joseph's. Construction resumed in 1924, and Archbishop Henry O'Leary designated the unfinished St. Joseph's as the cathedral for the diocese. However, construction was again halted during the years of the Great Depression and the Second World War. In 1951 St Joseph's became the first parish in Canada to hold perpetual adoration.

Planning for a new design began in 1954. Construction of the superstructure began in 1960 and the completed cathedral was officially opened on May 1, 1963, the Feast of St. Joseph the Worker. St. Joseph's Cathedral was named a minor basilica shortly before Pope John Paul II visited Edmonton in 1984. This was in part because of the papal visit but also to recognize the efforts of early missionaries and the people of the diocese. It was the first church west of Manitoba to receive this honour.

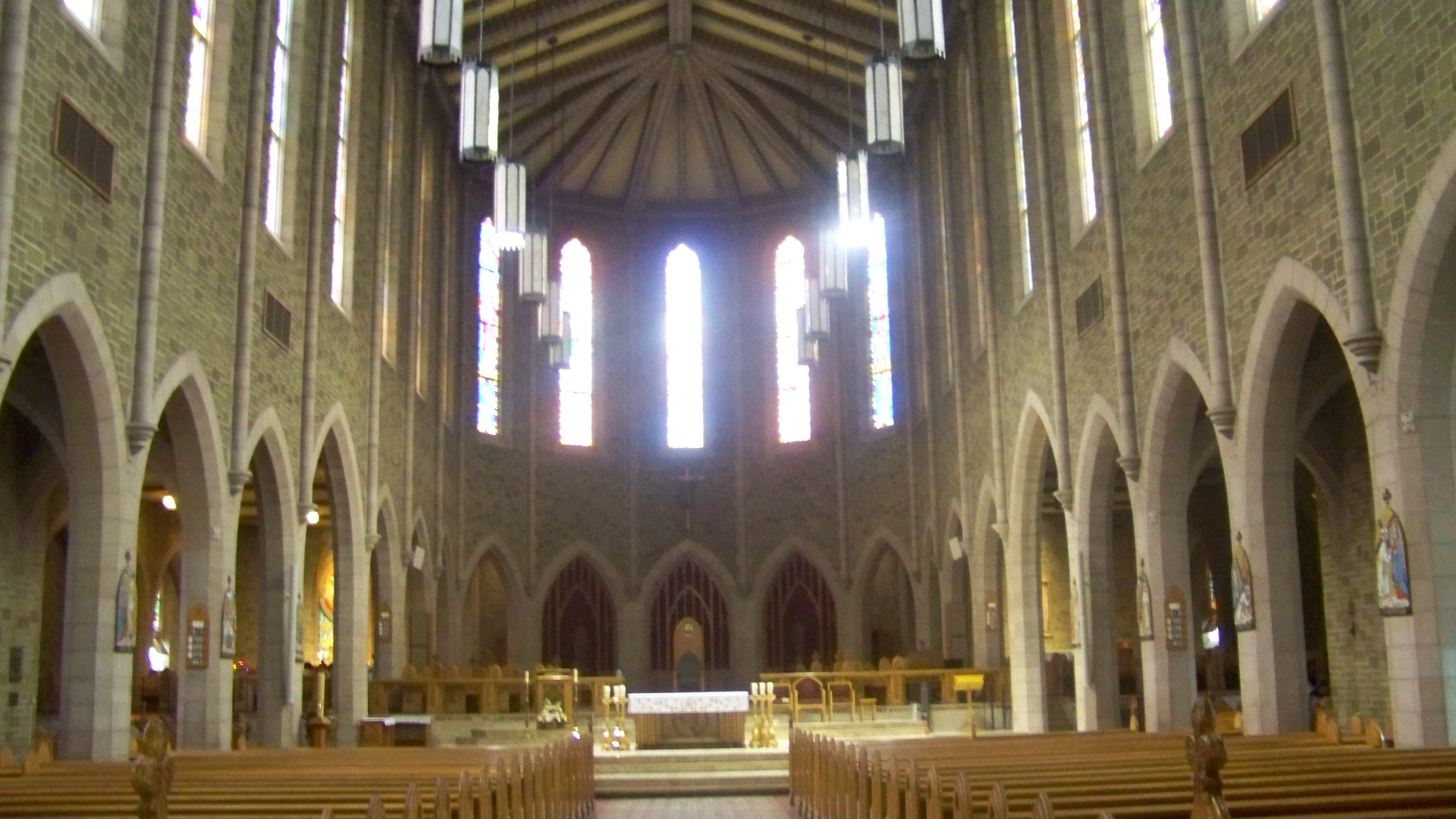
Interior of the basilica, with the altar in the background. In the 1980s, the altar was damaged by arsonists.

For almost three decades the cathedral was known as a "church without locks," as it was open 24 hours. However the number of people who attended perpetual adoration had been declining when on the morning of February 28, 1980 an arsonist set the altar and crucifix on fire, causing smoke and water damage to the whole building. To remove soot and smell, all the stones inside the church had to be scrubbed. Its prized possession, the Casavant Brothers organ, was sent to Quebec for cleaning and repairs. Cleanup and repair costs exceeded $250,000, with the repairs completed by December 1981. As a result of the fire the church ended both its open door policy and the practice of perpetual adoration.

It also had its share of fame when parishioners shrugged off the controversy and international publicity surrounding the wedding of hockey superstar Wayne Gretzky to actress Janet Jones, both non-Catholics. About a hundred people objected to the ceremony being held at the basilica on July 16, 1988 but many more applauded the Church's openness.

Since its completion and dedication in 1963 it has seen the service and leadership of four archbishops including Archbishop Anthony Jordan, retired Archbishop Joseph MacNeil, Archbishop Thomas Collins, and presently, Archbishop Richard William Smith. Father Len Gartner took over as rector of the basilica in July 2001. The last time he served at St. Joseph's was in the mid-1960s when he was just one year fresh out of the seminary.

Of architectural note are the 60 stained glass windows depicting the Twelve Apostles, Old Testament characters, scenes from the Bible, and from the church's connection to St. Albert, the first diocese in Alberta.

== Notable persons associated with St. Joseph's ==
In its early years, the cathedral parish was an unofficial training ground for the Canadian hierarchy. Three former rectors and an associate pastor became bishops: Msgr. James McGuigan was named archbishop of Regina, later archbishop of Toronto and Canada's first English-speaking cardinal; Msgr. C.J. Nelligan became bishop of Pembroke, Ont.; Father Edward Jennings, auxiliary bishop of Vancouver, later of Fort William, Ont.; Msgr. Michael O'Neill, archbishop of Regina, and Father Emmett Doyle, bishop of Nelson.

- Archbishop Henry O'Leary
- Archbishop Anthony Jordan
- Archbishop Joseph MacNeil
- Archbishop Thomas Collins
- Archbishop Richard William Smith
- James McGuigan
- Edward Jennings
- Michael O'Neill
- Emmett Doyle
