= Mary Immaculate (disambiguation) =

Mary Immaculate is the Immaculate Conception of Mary in the teachings of the Catholic Church.

Mary Immaculate may also refer to:

== United Kingdom ==
- St. Mary Immaculate Roman Catholic Church, Warwick, England
- Mary Immaculate and St Peter, New Barnet, London
- St. Mary Immaculate Catholic Primary School, Warwick, England
- Mary Immaculate High School, Vale of Glamorgan, Wales

== Other locations ==
- Bon Secours Mary Immaculate Hospital, Newport News, Virginia, United States
- Mary Immaculate College, Limerick, Ireland
- Mary Immaculate Seminary, Northampton, Pennsylvania, US (closed 1990)
- Mary Immaculate Girls' High School, Mumbai, India
- Mary Immaculate Church, Annerley, Queensland, Australia
- Mary Immaculate Catholic Church, Waverley, New South Wales, Australia
- Mary Immaculate School for Native Americans, Desmet, Idaho, United States
- Mary Immaculate Cathedral (Nelson, British Columbia), Canada

== See also ==
- "Immaculate Mary", a Roman Catholic hymn
