= Charles Halpin =

Charles Halpin may refer to:

- Charles Aimé Halpin (1930–1994), archbishop of the Roman Catholic Archdiocese of Regina, Saskatchewan, Canada from 1973 to 1994
- Charles G. Halpine or Halpin (1829–1868), Irish-American writer and soldier
