= Charles Aimé Halpin =

- Archbishop of Regina
- Church: Catholic Church
- Archdiocese: Archdiocese of Regina
- In office: 24 September 1973 – 16 April 1994
- Predecessor: Michael Cornelius O’Neill
- Successor: Peter Mallon

Orders
- Ordination: 27 May 1956 by Philip Pocock
- Consecration: 26 November 1973 by George Flahiff

Personal details
- Born: 30 August 1930 Saint Eustache (north of Elie), Manitoba, Dominion of Canada, British Empire
- Died: 16 April 1994 (aged 63) Regina, Saskatchewan, Canada

Charles Aimé Halpin (30 August 1930 – 16 April 1994) was the archbishop of the Roman Catholic Archdiocese of Regina, Saskatchewan, Canada, from 12 December 1973 until his death.

== Biography ==
Born 30 August 1930 in St. Eustache, Manitoba, he was ordained a priest at St. Eustache on 27 May 1956. A native bilingual Francophone during a period of amiable interaction with other Christian denominations both his leadership among clergy and laypeople of his Archbishopric and with fellow Christian clergy and laypeople of other denominations were of unprecedented cordiality and inspiration.

He died at Pasqua Hospital in Regina on 16 April 1994.

== See also ==
- Holy Rosary Cathedral (Regina, Saskatchewan)
- Our Lady of Assumption Co-Cathedral
- List of cathedrals in Canada
