= Bittman =

Bittman is a surname. Notable people with the surname include:

- Dan Bittman (born 1962), Romanian singer who represented the country at the Eurovision Song Contest 1994
- Gregory Bittman, Canadian Roman Catholic bishop
- Mark Bittman (born 1950), American journalist and food writer

== See also ==
- Lawrence Martin-Bittman (1931–2018), American artist and writer
- Red Bittmann (1862–1929), American baseball player
