= Peter Mallon =

Canadian Catholic archbishop

His Grace, The Most Reverend Peter Joseph Mallon
- Archbishop of Regina
- Church: Roman Catholic Church
- See: Regina
- Appointed: June 9, 1995
- Term ended: March 30, 2005
- Predecessor: Charles Aimé Halpin
- Successor: Daniel Bohan
- Previous post: Bishop of Nelson (2004–2014)

Orders
- Ordination: May 27, 1956
- Consecration: February 2, 1990 by James Carney

Personal details
- Born: December 5, 1929 Prince Rupert, British Columbia, Canada
- Died: February 3, 2007 (aged 77) Pasqua Hospital, Regina, Saskatchewan, Canada
- Buried: Riverside Memorial Cemetery, Regina, Saskatchewan, Canada
- Denomination: Roman Catholic
- Residence: Prince Rupert; Terrace; Vancouver; Nelson; Regina
- Education: Seminary of Christ the King

Styles of Peter Joseph Mallon
- Reference style: His Grace; The Most Reverend
- Spoken style: Your Grace; Your Excellency
- Religious style: Archbishop

Ordination history of Peter Mallon
History
Episcopal consecration
- Principal consecrator: James Carney (Vancouver)
- Co-consecrators: Wilfrid Emmett Doyle (Nelson em.); Lawrence Sabatini (Kamloops)

Peter Joseph Mallon (December 5, 1929 – February 3, 2007) was an archbishop in the Archdiocese of Regina from June 9, 1995, until his retirement on March 30, 2005. He retired in 2005, at the age of 75, due to the Roman Catholic church's mandatory retirement policy. He died in 2007.

Catholic Church titles
Preceded by Wilfrid Emmett Doyle	Bishop of Nelson; 1990–1995	Succeeded by Eugene Cooney
Preceded by Charles Aimé Halpin	Archbishop of Regina; 1995–2005	Succeeded by Daniel Bohan
