= Daniel Bohan =

Canadian prelate

The Most Reverend Daniel Joseph Bohan
- Archbishop of Regina
- Archdiocese: Regina
- Installed: 2005
- Term ended: 2016
- Predecessor: Peter Joseph Mallon
- Successor: Donald Bolen
- Other post: Auxiliary Bishop of Toronto (2003-2005)

Personal details
- Born: November 8, 1941 Yarmouth, Nova Scotia, Canada
- Died: January 15, 2016 (aged 74) Regina, Saskatchewan, Canada
- Denomination: Roman Catholic
- Residence: Regina
- Education: Holy Heart Seminary, Halifax
- Coat of arms

Styles of Daniel Bohan
- Reference style: The Most Reverend
- Spoken style: Your Grace
- Religious style: Archbishop

Daniel Joseph Bohan (November 8, 1941 – January 15, 2016) was a Canadian prelate of the Catholic Church and the Archbishop of the Regina Archdiocese. Prior to his appointment to Regina, Archbishop Bohan was Auxiliary Bishop of Toronto, and a priest in several parishes in New Brunswick.

From 1968 to 1969, Bohan was professor of Moral Theology at Holy Heart Seminary in Halifax, Nova Scotia.

He also has hosted and attended many speaking engagements in the city of Regina. He died of cancer in Regina on January 15, 2016.
