= John Corriveau =

Canadian Catholic bishop (born 1941)

John Dennis Corriveau OFM Cap
- Bishop Emeritus of Nelson
- Church: Catholic Church
- Diocese: Diocese of Nelson
- In office: 30 November 2007 – 13 February 2018
- Predecessor: Eugene Jerome Cooney
- Successor: Gregory Bittman
- Previous post: Minister General of the Order of Friars Minor Capuchin (1994-2006)

Orders
- Ordination: 23 October 1965
- Consecration: 3 January 2008 by Luigi Ventura

Personal details
- Born: 27 July 1941 (age 85) Zurich, Ontario, Dominion of Canada, British Empire

Styles of John Corriveau
- Reference style: The Most Reverend
- Spoken style: Your Excellency
- Religious style: Monsignor
- Posthumous style: not applicable

John Dennis Corriveau OFM Cap (born 27 July 1941) is a Canadian prelate of the Roman Catholic Church. He served successively as the seventy-first Minister General of the Order of Friars Minor Capuchin and the sixth Bishop of Nelson.

== Biography ==
John Corriveau was born on the shores of Lake Huron in Zurich, Ontario. He was initially attracted to the diocesan priesthood, but decided to enter the religious life like one of his cousins (who was a Redemptorist). He attended the Capuchin minor seminary in Blenheim, and then went to the United States to continue his education. He studied at the Capuchin novitiate in Cumberland, Maryland, St. Fidelis College (1960–1962) in Herman, Pennsylvania, and Capuchin College in Washington, D.C. (1962–1966), from where he obtained his MA in religious education.

Corriveau made his temporary vows as a Capuchin on 14 July 1960, and his perpetual profession exactly three years later, on 14 July 1963. Following his was priestly ordination on 23 October 1965, he served as a lecturer and the prefect of discipline at Mount Alverno Minor Seminary in Toronto, Ontario.

Corriveau was elected Councillor of the vice-province of Central Canada in 1969; during his three-year-long tenure as Councillor, he also held the office of Guardian and Chaplain for the Christian Brothers. He was elected Minister of the vice-province being in both 1971 and 1974. He then served as President of the Conference of Capuchins of North America until 1975, whence he became pastor of St. Philip Neri Parish in Toronto. In 1980, he was nominated to serve on the General Council of the Capuchins. After a sabbatical year, he was once again elected Provincial of Central Canada in 1989. During that same year, he began a year's study of pastoral theology at Berkeley in California.

Corriveau was the worldwide head of his religious order as the seventy-first Minister General of the Capuchins from 1994 to 2006; although his headquarters were located in Rome, he travelled for the majority of the year. He once said of the post, "The general minister is not so much an authority figure but a charismatic figure representing our contact with St. Francis". Upon his return to Canada, he began work at St. Francis' Table, a restaurant for the poor in Parkdale, where the Capuchin priest welcomed guests and served as a waiter, whilst doing parish work on weekends.

On 30 November 2007, he was appointed the sixth Bishop of Nelson, British Columbia, by Pope Benedict XVI. Corriveau received his episcopal consecration on 30 January 2008, from Archbishop Luigi Ventura, with Archbishop Raymond Roussin and Bishop Eugene Cooney serving as co-consecrators, in the Cathedral of Nelson. He was formally installed as bishop on 31 January.

Corriveau took as his episcopal motto, "Pacificans per sanguinem crucis eius" (Colossians 1:20), or "Making peace through the blood of His cross."

Catholic Church titles
| Preceded by Flavio Roberto Carraro | Minister General of the Order of Friars Minor Capuchin; 1994–2006 | Succeeded by Mauro Jöhri |
| Preceded by Eugene Cooney | Bishop of Nelson; 2007–2018 | Succeeded by Gregory Bittman |
