= Caltadria =

Suppressed and titular see of the Roman Catholic Church

Roman Empire - Mauretania Caesariensis (125 AD)

The diocese of Caltadria (Latin: Dioecesis Caltadriensis) is a suppressed and titular see of the Roman Catholic Church.

The location of the bishopric's original cathedra is now lost but it was in today's Algeria, and is recorded of the Roman province of Mauretania Caesariensis during late antiquity.

The only known bishop of this diocese is Victor, who took part in the synod assembled in Carthage in 484 by the Vandal King Huneric, after which Victor was exiled. Today Caltadria survives as a titular bishopric and the current bishop is Janusz Ostrowski, of Warmia, Poland.

== Known bishops ==
- Victor fl.484
- Josip Mrzljak 1998–2007
- César Daniel Fernandez 2007–2012
- Gregory Bittman 2012–2018
- Janusz Ostrowski 2018–current
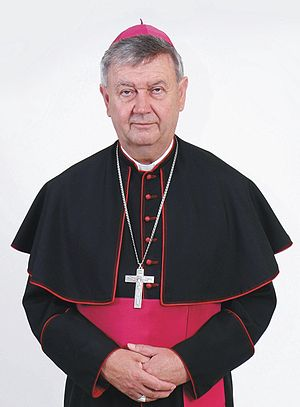
Biskup Josip Mrzljak.
