= Mary Immaculate Cathedral (Nelson, British Columbia) =

- Mary Immaculate Cathedral
- 49°29.344′N 117°17.474′W
- Location: Nelson, British Columbia
- Country: Canada
- Denomination: Roman Catholic Church

Administration
- Diocese: Roman Catholic Diocese of Nelson

Mary Immaculate Cathedral also Cathedral of the Immaculate Conception is the name of a religious building affiliated with the Catholic Church that is located in the town of Nelson in the north of the province of British Columbia in western Canada.

The church is the mother church of the Roman Catholic Diocese of Nelson (Latin: Dioecesis Nelsonensis) which was created in 1843 as an apostolic vicariate and was elevated to a diocese in 1936 by the bull "Universorum christifidelium" of Pope Pius XI.

The current building dates back to 1889 when it began as a parish, being built as a cathedral between 1936, year in which it obtained the current status. With its six two storey columns across the front and other features it is an example of Roman Classic architecture.

Its current administrator is Bishop Gregory Bittman.

== See also ==
- List of cathedrals in Canada
- Holy Rosary Cathedral (Vancouver)
