= Mauro Jöhri =

Father Mauro Jöhri O.F.M. Cap.
- Minister General Emeritus of the Order of Friars Minor Capuchin
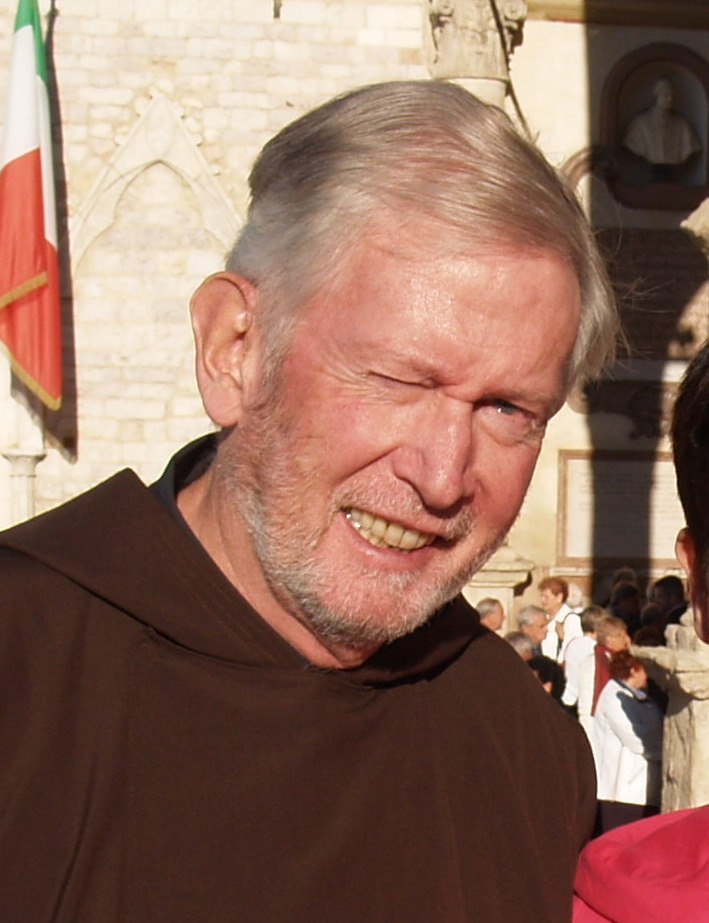
- Church: Roman Catholic Church
- Elected: 5 September 2006
- Term ended: 3 September 2018
- Predecessor: John Corriveau
- Successor: Roberto Genuin
- Other post: President of the Union of Superiors General (2015-)
- Previous post: Vice-President of the Union of Superiors General (2014-15)

Orders
- Ordination: 1972 by Pierre Mamie

Personal details
- Born: Mauro Jöhri; 1 September 1947 (age 79) Bivio, Graubünden, Switzerland
- Education: University of Fribourg; University of Lucerne

Mauro Jöhri (born 1 September 1947 in Bivio, Graubünden, Switzerland) is a Swiss Roman Catholic friar and theologian. He was the Minister General of the Order of Friars Minor Capuchin, having served from 2006 to 2018 (following re-election in 2012). He is also a Professor of Theology.

Father Jöhri is fluent in German, Romansh, French and Italian, the four languages of Switzerland. He joined his order in 1964 as a novice, and studied Theology at the order's seminary in Solothurn. He was ordained a priest in 1972, and continued his studies in Fribourg, Tübingen and Lucerne, where he earned a doctorate with a dissertation on the work of Hans Urs von Balthasar.

In the following years, he lived in the monastery of Madonna del Sasso in Locarno, where he was active as a teacher. Subsequently, he taught dogmatic theology and fundamental theology at the theological seminary in Chur, and served as a Professor of Theology at the University of Lugano.

He became the minister provincial of the Swiss branch of his order in 1995. He also undertook studies at the Institut de formation humaine intégrale in Montreal, Canada, before returning to his post as provincial superior, eventually being elected as minister general in 2006.

== Publications ==
- Descensus Dei: teologia della croce nell'opera di Hans Urs von Balthasar. Roma: Libr. Ed. della Pontificia Univ. Lateranense 1981 (dissertation, Lucerne, 1980)
- Hans Urs von Balthasar (1905-1988): eine katholische "dialektische Theologie". In: Stephan Leimgruber und Max Schoch (ed.): Gegen die Gottvergessenheit: Schweizer Theologen im 19. und 20. Jahrhundert. Basel: Herder 1990, pp. 420–439
