= Eugene Jerome Cooney =

Canadian Roman Catholic bishop (born 1931)

The Most Reverend Eugene Jerome Cooney
- Bishop Emeritus of Nelson
- Church: Roman Catholic Church
- Diocese: Diocese of Nelson
- Appointed: 15 March 1996
- Installed: 13 June 1996
- Term ended: 30 November 2007
- Predecessor: Peter Joseph Mallon
- Successor: John Dennis Corriveau

Orders
- Ordination: 4 June 1960 by Francis Patrick Carroll
- Consecration: 11 June 1996 by Paul John O’Byrne

Personal details
- Born: 20 December 1931 (age 94) Medicine Hat, Alberta, Canada

Eugene Jerome Cooney (born 20 December 1931) is a Canadian Roman Catholic prelate, who served as Bishop of the Diocese of Nelson from 1996 until his retirement in 2007.

== Early life and education ==
Cooney was born on 20 December 1931 in Medicine Hat, Alberta. He pursued his priestly formation prior to ordination in 1960.

== Priestly ministry ==
Cooney was ordained to the priesthood on 4 June 1960 for the Roman Catholic Diocese of Calgary by bishop Francis Patrick Carroll. During his priestly ministry he served in various pastoral and diocesan roles within Alberta.

== Episcopal ministry ==
On 15 March 1996, Pope John Paul II appointed Cooney Bishop of the Diocese of Nelson, British Columbia. He was consecrated bishop on 11 June 1996 and took canonical possession of the diocese on 13 June 1996.

His resignation as Bishop of Nelson was accepted by Pope Benedict XVI on 30 November 2007.

Following his retirement, he assumed the title Bishop Emeritus of Nelson.
