= International Anglican–Roman Catholic Commission for Unity and Mission =

- Abbreviation: IARCCUM
- Formation: 2001
- Type: Ecumenical commission
- Purpose: Promote unity and collaboration between the Anglican Communion and the Roman Catholic Church
- Headquarters: Rome, Italy & Canterbury, United Kingdom
- Region served: International
- Leader: Bishop David Hamid (Anglican) & Archbishop Don Bolen (Catholic)
- Parent organization: Anglican Communion & Pontifical Council for Promoting Christian Unity
- Website: iarccum.org

The International Anglican–Roman Catholic Commission for Unity and Mission (IARCCUM) is a commission established in 2001 by the Anglican Communion and the Roman Catholic Church as an official joint commission. IARCCUM exists in parallel with its theological counterpart Anglican–Roman Catholic International Commission.

== Description ==
IARCCUM's purpose is:

- to facilitate the development of strategies for translating the degree of spiritual communion that has been achieved into visible and practical outcomes;
- to promote and monitor the formal response and reception of the agreed statements of ARCIC;
- to strengthen relations between ARCIC and national Anglican-Roman Catholic Commissions (ARCs), and between different national ARCs, providing support and resources in order to foster an exchange of information and practice;
- to encourage Anglican Provinces and Roman Catholic Episcopal Conferences to establish ARC dialogues where they do not exist;
- to encourage Anglican and Roman Catholic bishops to develop projects and programmes of joint witness and mission in the world.

In 2000, Archbishop George Carey, then Archbishop of Canterbury, and Cardinal Edward Cassidy, then President of the Vatican's Pontifical Council for Promoting Christian Unity, convoked a conference of Anglican and Roman Catholic bishops at Mississauga in Canada to discern the progress made in theological conversations since the 1960s, and whether closer co-operation could be developed between the two traditions. The result was IARCCUM, which has been meeting since 2001. In February 2007, it published the first fruit of its work, the report Growing Together in Unity and Mission, accompanied by two commentaries. IARCCUM’s work continues under the Co-Chairmanship of Bishop Donald Bolen, Suffragan Bishop of the Diocese in Europe, and Archbishop Don Bolen.

== See also ==
- Anglican-Roman Catholic dialogue
