= Roman Catholic Diocese of Nelson =

Catholic ecclesiastical territory

Diocese of Nelson Dioecesis Nelsonensis
- Logo of the Diocese

Location
- Country: Canada
- Territory: South-eastern British Columbia
- Ecclesiastical province: Vancouver

Statistics
- Area: 124,272 km^{2} (47,982 sq mi)
- Population: 65,000 (17.8%)

Information
- Denomination: Roman Catholic
- Rite: Roman Rite
- Established: February 22, 1936
- Cathedral: Mary Immaculate Cathedral, Nelson

Current leadership
- Pope: Leo XIV
- Bishop: Gregory John Bittman
- Metropolitan Archbishop: Richard W. Smith
- Bishops emeritus: Eugene Jerome Cooney; John Corriveau

Website
- www.nelsondiocese.org

The Roman Catholic Diocese of Nelson (Latin: Dioecesis Nelsonensis) (erected 22 February 1936) is a suffragan of the Archdiocese of Vancouver.

== Diocesan demographics ==
The diocese contains 31 parishes. Serving or retired in the diocese are 28 diocesan priests and 7 religious priests ministering to 75,000 Catholics. As of March 2011 it also has 13 religious sisters and supports 7 Catholic schools. This diocese covers two time zones with the East Kootenay and Columbia Valley on Mountain Time and the rest on Pacific Time.

== History ==
In the late 1830s French Canadians in the Oregon Territory petitioned the Quebec bishops to have missionary priests sent beyond the Rocky Mountains. In response to this plea, Fathers François-Norbert Blanchet and Modeste Demers were sent West to a remote part of the Quebec diocese referred to as New Caledonia by the Hudson's Bay Company. While at Boat Encampment on the Columbia River (Mica Dam area), Blanchet and Demers celebrated Mass on October 10, 1838, the first Mass celebrated in what later became the Diocese of Nelson.

During the years of westward expansion and settlement, the spiritual needs of the region presently administered by the Diocese of Nelson came under the jurisdiction of various bishoprics:

- Vicariate Apostolic of the Oregon Territory, 1843–1846
- Diocese of Vancouver Island, 1846–1863
- Vicariate Apostolic of British Columbia, 1863–1890
- Diocese of New Westminster, 1890–1908
- Archdiocese of Vancouver, 1908–1936

On February 22, 1936, Pope Pius XI erected the Diocese of Nelson to cover the Kootenay and Okanagan regions of southeastern British Columbia.

== Bishops ==
=== Ordinaries ===
- Martin Michael Johnson (1936–1954), appointed Coadjutor Archbishop of Vancouver, British Columbia
- Thomas Joseph McCarthy (1955–1958), appointed Bishop of Saint Catharines, Ontario
- Wilfrid Emmett Doyle (1958–1989)
- Peter Joseph Mallon (1989–1995), appointed Archbishop of Regina, Saskatchewan
- Eugene Cooney (1996–2007)
- John Corriveau (2007–2018)
- Gregory John Bittman (2018–present)

=== Other priest of this diocese who became bishop ===
- Bartolomeus Van Roijen, appointed Bishop of Corner Brook and Labrador, Newfoundland in 2019

== Churches ==
Castlegar

- St. Rita's

Cranbrook

- St. Mary's
- Christ the Servant

Creston

- Holy Cross

Fernie

- Holy Family

Fruitvale

- St. Rita's

Golden

- Sacred Heart

Grand Forks

- Sacred Heart

Invermere

- Canadian Martyrs

Kelowna

- Immaculate Conception Church
- St. Pius X
- Corpus Christi
- St. Charles Garnier

Keremeos

- Our Lady of Lourdes

Kimberley

- Sacred Heart

Nakusp

- Our Lady of Lourdes

Nelson

- Mary Immaculate Cathedral

Oliver

- Christ the King

Osoyoos

- St. Anne's

Penticton

- St. Ann's
- St. John Vianney's

Princeton

- St. Peter's

Revelstoke

- St. Francis of Assisi

Rossland

- Sacred Heart

Sparwood

- St. Michael's

Summerland

- Holy Child

Trail

- Our Lady of Perpetual Help
- St. Anthony / St. Francis Xavier

West Kelowna

- Our Lady of Lourdes

Winfield

- St. Edward's

== Education ==
=== Catholic high schools ===
| School | City | Est. | Website | Enrollment |
|---|---|---|---|---|
| Immaculata Regional High School | Kelowna | 1960 | https://www.immaculatakelowna.ca | ~350 (co-ed) |

=== Catholic elementary schools ===
| School | City | Est. | Website |
|---|---|---|---|
| Holy Cross | Penticton | | http://www.holyc.com/ |
| Our Lady of Lourdes | West Kelowna | | https://www.olol-bc.com/ |
| St. Joseph | Nelson | | http://www.stjosephnelson.ca/ |
| St. Mary's | Cranbrook | | http://www.stmarysschool.ca/ |
| St. Joseph | Kelowna | 1938 | http://www.stjosephkelowna.ca/ |
| St. Michael's Catholic | Trail | | http://www.smces.ca/index.html |

== Religious institutes ==
=== Religious institutes of men ===
- Order of St. Augustine
- Missionary Oblates of Mary Immaculate
- Order of Friars Minor, Capuchin
- Order of the Friars Minor
- MSTU Order
- Order of St. Basil

=== Religious institutes of women ===
- Sisters of the Atonement (SA)
- Sisters of Charity of Halifax (SC)
- Sisters of Charity of St. Louis (SCSL)
- Daughters of Providence (FDLP)
- Congregation of Notre Dame (CND)

== Notes ==
The diocese publishes the Catholic Mountain Star newspaper.
