= Wilfrid Emmett Doyle =

Canadian prelate

- Bishop of Nelson
- Church: Catholic Church
- Diocese: Diocese of Nelson
- In office: November 9, 1958 – November 6, 1989
- Predecessor: Thomas Joseph McCarthy
- Successor: Peter Mallon

Orders
- Ordination: June 5, 1938 by John Hugh MacDonald
- Consecration: December 3, 1958 by Giovanni Panico

Personal details
- Born: February 18, 1913 Calgary, Alberta, Dominion of Canada, British Empire
- Died: September 14, 2003 (aged 90) Kelowna, British Columbia, Canada

Styles of Wilfrid Doyle
- Reference style: The Most Reverend
- Spoken style: Your Excellency
- Religious style: Monsignor
- Posthumous style: none

Wilfrid Emmett Doyle (February 18, 1913 – September 14, 2003) was a Canadian prelate of the Roman Catholic Church. He served as Bishop of Nelson from 1958 to 1989.

== Biography ==
Doyle was born in Calgary, Alberta, as one of twelve children; his ancestors had immigrated to Canada from County Wexford in Ireland. He attended Sacred Heart School and St. Joseph's High School in Edmonton, and the University of Alberta, from where he obtained his Bachelor of Arts degree in 1935. He also studied theology at St. Joseph's Seminary in Edmonton. Doyle was ordained to the priesthood by Archbishop John MacDonald on June 5, 1938, and continued his studies at St. Paul's University Seminary in Ottawa, earning his doctorate in canon law in 1949. He later became chancellor of the Archdiocese of Edmonton.

On November 9, 1958, Doyle was appointed the third Bishop of Nelson, British Columbia, by Pope John XXIII. Doyle received his episcopal consecration on the following December 3 from Archbishop Giovanni Panico, with Archbishop Michael O'Neill and Bishop Francis Allen serving as co-consecrators.

A leading figure in Canadian catechetics, he taught the Come to the Father catechetical series and was named head of the Canadian Bishops' Office for Religious Education when the series was expanded; he later stated, "My spiritual life began when I started teaching the Come to the Father series". Doyle also served as national director of the Confraternity of Christian Doctrine (1962-1986), President of the then Office for Religious Education (1966-1970), director of the National Office of Religious Education (1966-1967), and Chairman of the Episcopal Commission for Religious Education (1966-1969).

He attended the Second Vatican Council from 1962 to 1965. In 1976, he appointed Sr. Katherine Meagher as the chancellor of his diocese, making her the first woman to hold that post in Canada.

== Sexual Abuse Scandals ==
Doyle was Bishop during a string of sexual abuse scandals in the diocese that started before he took office (as early as 1947) and lasted until at least 1992, three years after he retired. At least seven priests were charged with sexual abuse of minors during his tenure in office including:

- In 1988, John Monaghan, 83, the vicar-general of the diocese and Bishop Emmett Doyle’s right-hand man – pleaded guilty to 17 counts of fondling little girls for 30 years. He was jailed for four years. Doyle admitted that he had been told of Monaghan's activities in the mid-sixties but had assigned someone to speak to the priest about the matter and had taken no further action. Doyle kept Monaghan actively assigned to St Joseph’s, the Catholic Elementary School in Nelson BC, in spite of his knowledge of Monaghan’s past abuse. Monaghan continued preying on young girls, many of who were students at the Catholic Elementary School where he was assigned. This abuse continued for another twenty years until his 1984 arrest.
- In 1989, Leonard Buckley, a priest who was principal of St. Mary’s School in Cranbrook for 15 years, pleaded guilty to fondling 10 boys in Cranbrook and Penticton while on camping trips with them. The 54-year-old priest got five years.
- The same year, former New Denver priest Luc Meunier was charged with assault in New Denver, Trail and Prince Rupert, BC, as well as locations in Ontario and Saskatchewan. He was also charged with fondling children in the 1960s. The charges were laid after one of Meunier’s victims read of Monaghan’s crimes and drove all night to Nelson to report his abuse. Meunier, who died in a Florida prison awaiting extradition in 1989 at age 74, had been convicted of child sex abuse in Arizona in 1975 and served two years.
- In 1990, Calgary priest Robert Whyte, 70, was sentenced in Calgary to four years for fondling boys for more than 20 years. Many of the offences took place in the Nelson Diocese.
- Catholic priest Robert Whyte pleaded guilty to molesting kids during Nelson camping trips.
- Westbank Catholic priest Kevin Rolston was convicted of buggery and gross indecency involving two boys. The judge found Rolston had no sense of moral responsibility– the priest claimed the boys seduced him.
- Kelowna Catholic priest Kenneth Farrell was convicted for committing indecent sexual acts with teenage boys on camping trips. He lured them with booze and smokes.
- Catholic priest Ian Cooper pleaded guilty to 14 counts of indecent assault on boys and girls.
- Nelson Catholic priest Paul Pornbacher pleaded guilty to three counts of indecent assault. Pornbacher's application to the Immigration Appeal Board to avoid deportation back to his native Italy was turned down in 1998 but there is no record easily available showing he was actually deported from Canada. The Immigration Appeal Panel commented:

"At the hearing, the appellant felt that he was the only victim of this ordeal and failed to take any responsibility for any of his criminal convictions. The panel is profoundly astounded and dismayed by the appellant's insistence that he is not guilty of any of his convictions which indicates that there has been little or no rehabilitation. With little if any genuine remorse and no acceptance of responsibility for his offences, the panel finds that the appellant does pose a risk of re-offending."

In 2004, the Supreme Court of Canada held that a bishop/diocese could be held vicariously liable for the sexual misdeeds of priests in the case of John Doe v. Bennett. Until that time, the Church had argued that a priest was not an "employee" of a diocese and therefore the bishop was not his employer and not vicariously liable. The court said that there the five elements necessary to establish vicarious liability exist in a sexual abuse situation involving a priest:

1. The relationship between the diocesan enterprise and the priest is sufficiently close.

2. There is a connection between the employer-created or enhanced risk and the wrong complained of.

3. The bishop provides the priest with the opportunity to abuse his power.

4. The priest's wrongful acts are strongly related to the psychological intimacy inherent in his role as priest.

5. The bishop confers an enormous degree of power on the priest relative to his victims.

== Retirement ==
He later retired as Bishop on November 6, 1989, after nearly thirty-one years of service. Doyle then did work in the Diocese of Kamloops before moving in 2001 to St. Elizabeth Seton House of Prayer in Kelowna, which he had established during his tenure as Bishop and where he and others were later forced to evacuate when forest fires threatened to consume the residence.

Doyle died in his sleep in Kelowna, at age 90. He is buried in Nelson.

Catholic Church titles
Preceded by Thomas Joseph McCarthy	Bishop of Nelson; 1958–1989	Succeeded by Peter Joseph Mallon
