= Diocese of Gravelbourg =

Catholic ecclesiastical territory

Diocese of Gravelbourg Dioecesis Gravelburgensis

Location
- Country: Canada
- Metropolitan: Archdiocese of Regina

Statistics
- Area: 58,398 km^{2} (22,548 sq mi)

Information
- Rite: Roman Rite (Latin Church)

The Roman Catholic Diocese of Gravelbourg (Latin: Dioecesis Gravelburgensis) was a Latin suffragan of the Archdiocese of Regina and presently a Latin Catholic titular see. It was headquartered at the Cathedral of Our Lady of the Assumption in Gravelbourg, Saskatchewan.

Due to the declining Catholic population in the diocese, the last bishop, Raymond Roussin, was entrusted with dissolving the diocese in 1995. On September 14, 1998 the diocese reverted to the Archdiocese of Regina and the Diocese of Saskatoon.

== History ==
- Established on January 31, 1930 as the Diocese of Gravelbourg, on territory split off from the Roman Catholic Archdiocese of Regina.
- Suppressed as residential diocese on September 14, 1998, its territory being divided and reassigned to mother Archdiocese of Regina and Diocese of Saskatoon.

=== Residential ordinaries ===
(all Latin Church)

Suffragan Bishops of Gravelbourg

- Jean-Marie-Rodrigue Villeneuve, Missionary Oblates of Mary Immaculate (O.M.I.) (1930.07.03 – 1931.12.11), later Metropolitan Archbishop of Québec (Canada) (1931.12.11 – death 1947.01.17), created Cardinal-Priest of S. Maria degli Angeli (1933.03.16 – 1947.01.17)
- Louis-Joseph-Arthur Melanson (1932.11.25 – 1936.12.16), later Metropolitan Archbishop of Moncton (Canada) (1936.12.16 – 1941.10.23)
- Joseph-Wilfrid Guy, O.M.I. (1937.06.02 – 1942.11.07), previously Titular Bishop of Photice (1929.12.19 – 1937.06.02) & Apostolic Vicar of Grouard (Canada) (1929.12.19 – 1937.06.02); emeritate again as Titular Bishop of Photice (1942.11.07 – death 1951.12.08)
- Marie-Joseph Lemieux (マリー・ジョゼフ・ルミュー) (1944.04.07 – 1953.06.29), previously Bishop of Sendai 仙台 (Japan) (1935.12.03 – 1941.01.16), then Titular Bishop of Calydon (1941.01.16 – 1944.04.07); later Metropolitan Archbishop of Ottawa (Canada) (1953.06.29 – resigned 1966.09.24), then Titular Bishop of Saldæ (1966.09.24 – death 1994.03.04) & Apostolic Nuncio (papal ambassador) to Haiti (1966.09.24 – 1969), Apostolic Pro-Nuncio to India (1969 – 1971)
- Aimé Décosse (1953.11.03 – retired 1973.05.12)
- Noël Delaquis, Trappists (O.C.S.O.) (1973.12.03 – 1995.04.10); emeritate as first Titular Bishop of Gravelbourg (see below 1998.11.14 – present ...)
- Raymond O. Roussin, Marianists (S.M.) (1995.04.10 – 1998.09.14), later Coadjutor Bishop of Victoria (in Canada)) (1998.09.14 – 1999.03.18), succeeded as Bishop of Victoria (1999.03.18 – 2004.01.10), Metropolitan Archbishop of Vancouver (Canada) (2004.01.10 – 2009.01.02)

== Titular see ==
At the September 14, 1998 suppression of the residential see, the diocese was nominally transformed by creating the Titular bishopric of Gravelbourg.

It has had the following incumbents, of the lowest (episcopal) class :

- Noël Delaquis, Trappists (O.C.S.O.) (1998.11.14 – ...), Bishop emeritus (penultimate) of Gravelbourg (see above 1973.12.03 –1995.04.10)

== See also ==
- Catholic Church in Canada
