= Our Lady of Assumption Co-Cathedral =

Church in Gravelbourg, Saskatchewan, Canada

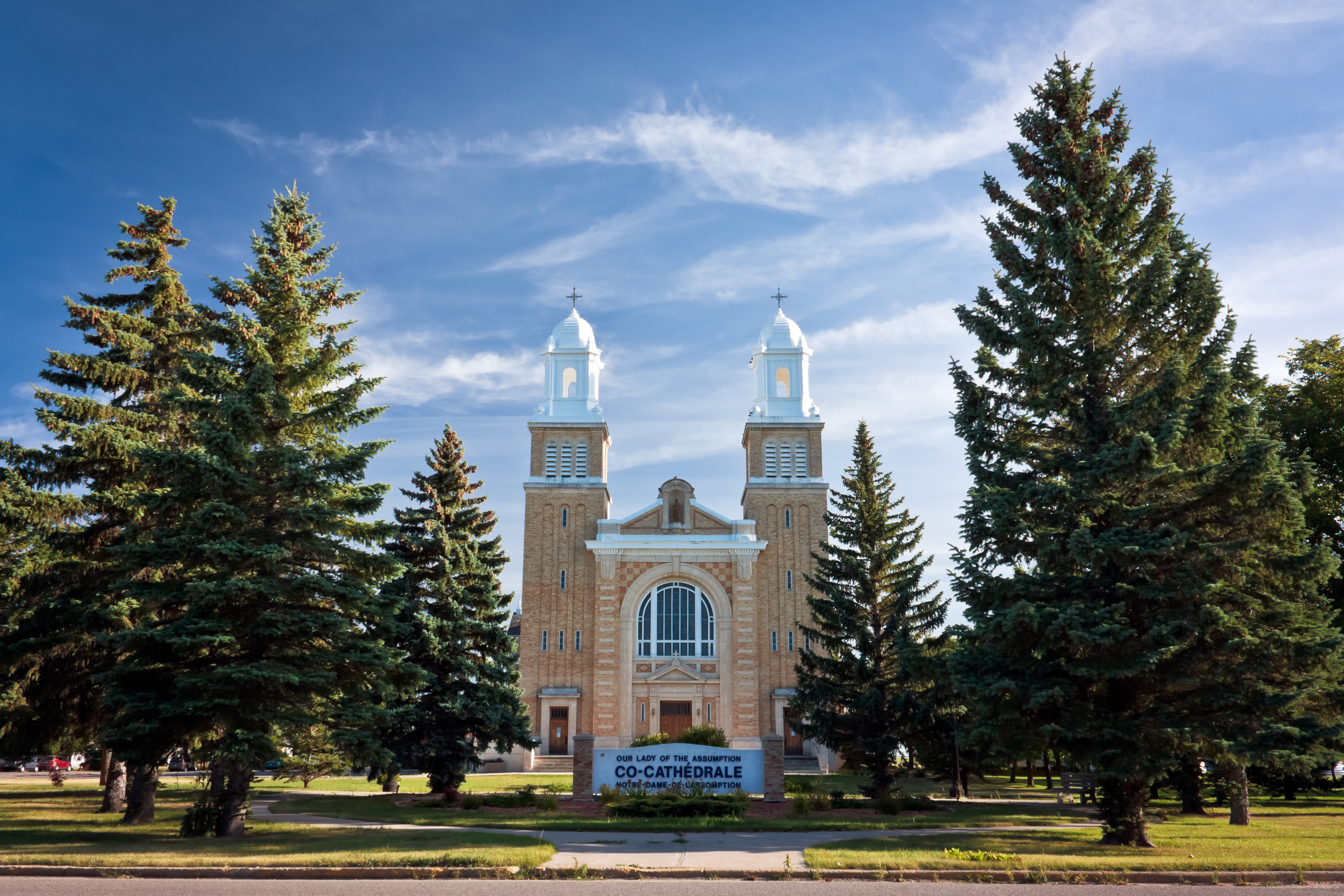
- La Cathédrale
- Our Lady of Assumption Co-Cathedral
- 49°52′20.6″N 106°33′26.3″W
- Location: Gravelbourg, Saskatchewan
- Country: Canada
- Denomination: Roman Catholic

History
- Former name(s): Église Sainte-Philomène; Church of Saint Philomena
- Status: Cathedral
- Founded: July 27, 1930 (as Cathedral)

Architecture
- Functional status: Active
- Heritage designation

National Historic Site of Canada
- Official name: Gravelbourg Ecclesiastical Buildings
- Designated: 1995
- Architect: Joseph-Ernest Fortin
- Style: Romanesque Revival
- Groundbreaking: 1918
- Completed: 1919
- Construction cost: $287,515.00

Specifications
- Capacity: 1,500
- Length: 54.8 metres (180 ft)
- Width: 25.9 metres (85 ft)
- Height: 19.8 metres (65 ft)
- Materials: Brick with stone trim, steel frame

Administration
- Diocese: Roman Catholic Archdiocese of Regina

Our Lady of Assumption Co-Cathedral or the Co-Cathédrale de Notre-Dame-de-l’Assomption is located in the Canadian prairie town of Gravelbourg, Saskatchewan.

== History ==
The cathedral of the francophone former Roman Catholic Diocese of Gravelbourg, Saskatchewan, for sixty-eight years, and originally dedicated to St. Philomena, the parish church of Gravelbourg became the Cathedral of St. Philomena July 27, 1930 and was renamed the Cathedral of Our Lady of the Assumption in 1965. On September 14, 1998, Pope John Paul II suppressed the Diocese, merging it with the Archdiocese of Regina—a reflection of the steady depopulation of rural Saskatchewan. Our Lady of Assumption Cathedral was then designated a co-cathedral of the archdiocese.

== Specifications ==
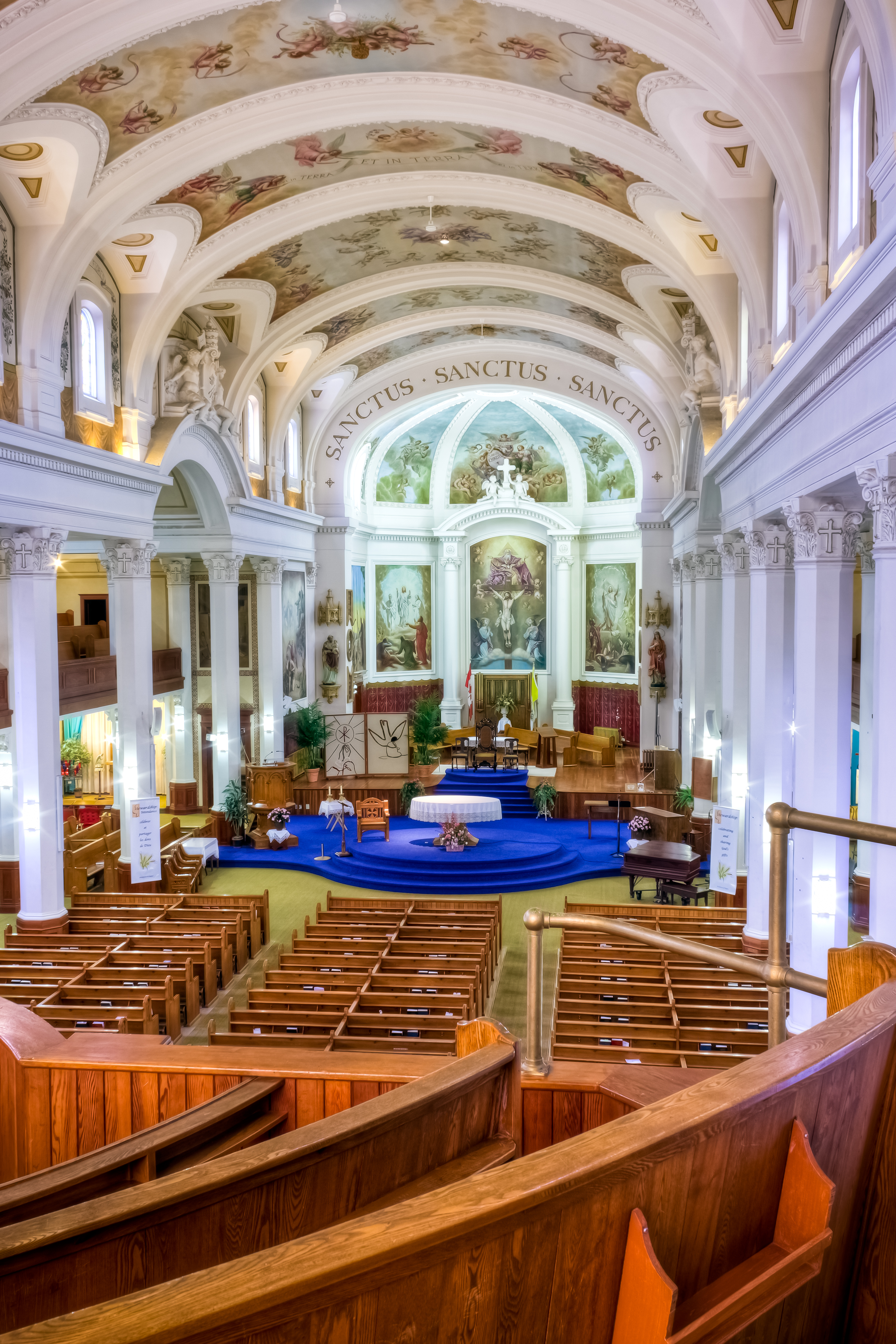
Interior of the Cathedral

According to the Archdiocese of Regina website,

"The architect, J. E. Fortin of Montreal, chose a style that combines Romanesque and Italian Renaissance. The church measures 54.8 metres in length, 25.9 metres in width at the transept, 15.8 metre in the nave and is 19.8 metres in height. It accommodates up to 1,500 people. Twin towers at the west end are capped with cupolas rising to a height of 53.3 metres. The building is steel frame with outer walls of tan-coloured brick trimmed with Indiana stone. Construction began in 1918 and the Most Reverend O. E. Mathieu, Archbishop of Regina, consecrated the completed structure on November 5, 1919. The interior decoration is entirely by Msgr. Charles Maillard, pastor of Gravelbourg, who carried out the work over a period of ten years from 1921 to 1931. The nave interior was altered in the 1960s to bring the church into conformity with the liturgical requirements issued by the Second Vatican Council."

The Institute for stained glass in Canada has documented the stained glass at Our Lady of Assumption Co-Cathedral.

== See also ==
- Holy Rosary Cathedral (Regina, Saskatchewan)
- Cathedrals in Canada
