= Holy Rosary Cathedral (Regina, Saskatchewan) =

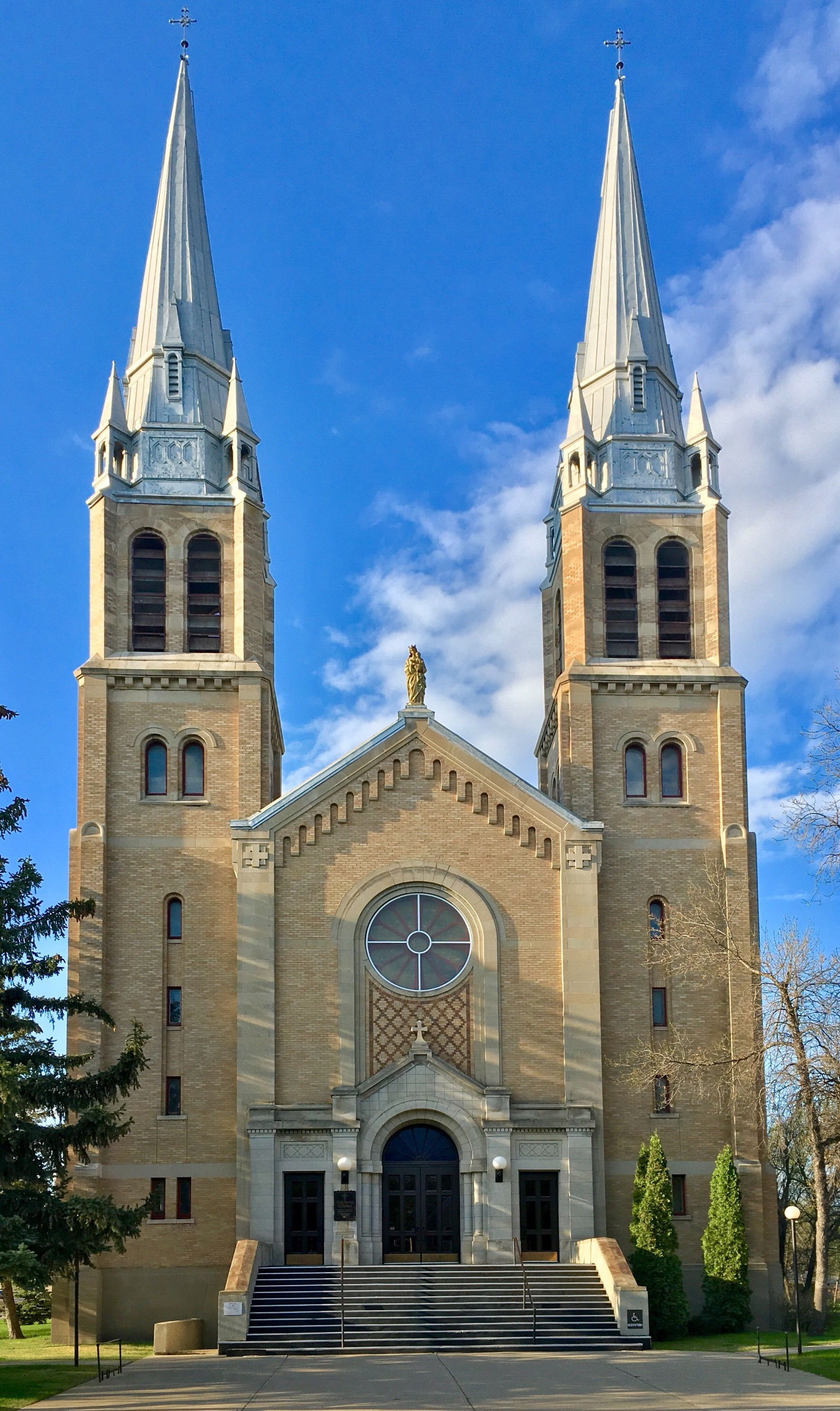
- Holy Rosary Cathedral in 2016
- Holy Rosary Cathedral
- 50.445028°N 104.626426°W
- Location: 2104 Garnet Street; Regina, Saskatchewan; S4T 6Y5
- Country: Canada
- Denomination: Roman Catholic
- Website: www.holyrosaryregina.ca

History
- Status: Cathedral
- Founded: November 11, 1911
- Consecrated: June 29, 1913

Architecture
- Functional status: Active
- Heritage designation: Regina Heritage Holding Bylaw List
- Designated: 1989
- Architect: Joseph Fortin
- Style: Romanesque Revival
- Groundbreaking: December 8, 1912
- Completed: 1917
- Construction cost: CA$135,000

Specifications
- Length: 200 feet (61 m)
- Height: 90 feet (27 m)

Administration
- Diocese: Roman Catholic Archdiocese of Regina

Clergy
- Archbishop: Archbishop Donald Bolen
- Rector: Reverend Father Danilo Rafael, Parish Administrator Director of Personnel

Holy Rosary Cathedral at 13th Avenue and Garnet Street in Regina, Saskatchewan, Canada, is the cathedral church of the Roman Catholic Archdiocese of Regina.

== History ==
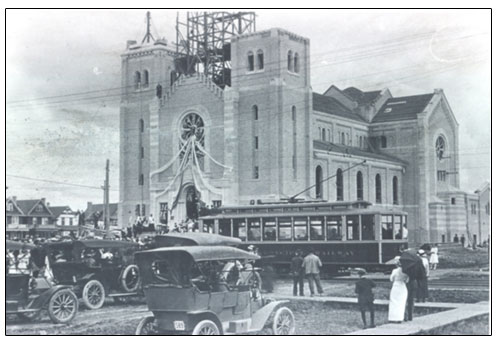
Blessing of Holy Rosary Cathedral, 1913

Construction began in 1912 and the cornerstone was blessed by the Apostolic Delegate to Canada, Archbishop Peregrene-François Stagni, O.S.M. on June 30, 1913 before an assembly of approximately 2,000 people. The building was completed in 1917.

It was designed in the Romanesque Revival style by the firm of Joseph Fortin of Montreal, who also designed the Roman Catholic cathedrals of St. Paul's in Saskatoon and Our Lady of Assumption in Gravelbourg, Saskatchewan. Modelled after churches in northern France, it is faced in yellow brick with limestone accents. Smith Brothers & Wilson oversaw construction and the final cost was $135,000.

Casavant Frères of Saint-Hyacinthe, Quebec, constructed and installed the gallery organ in 1930, to replace a large reed organ. It underwent extensive repairs after the 1976 fire and was renovated again in 1992–1993, after which it was named The McGuigan Organ in honour of Sister Marion McGuigan, a much-loved local humanitarian and educator.

Since its construction, the interior of the church has been extensively redecorated five times; in 1928, 1951, 1968, 1976, and 1992. Renovations in 1951 saw the installation of 43 stained glass windows by André Rault, while work in 1968 saw fundamental renovations for the church to conform with the directives of the Second Vatican Council. This included the dismantling of the high altar at the east end of the choir, and a nave altar being installed at the crossing. The choir was converted into a chapel.

A disastrous fire occurred on April 12, 1976, forcing renovations in the months following the fire. The Cathedral was unusable and Masses were held in the neighbouring Westminster United Church. The cathedral's pipe organ, built by Casavant Frères, and installed in the cathedral gallery in 1930, was damaged during the fire. It underwent extensive repairs after the 1976 fire and was renovated again in 1992–1993, after which it was named The McGuigan Organ in honour of Sister Marion McGuigan, a much-loved local humanitarian and educator. Other renovations in 1992 saw the opaque screen separating the nave from the choir removed, and the main altar restored to a position in the choir closer to the site of the original high altar in the former sanctuary.

The light and airy interior of the cathedral is decorated sparingly in keeping with Canadian aesthetic sensibilities. The Institute for Stained Glass in Canada has documented the stained glass at Holy Rosary Cathedral.

== Sacred Heart Academy ==
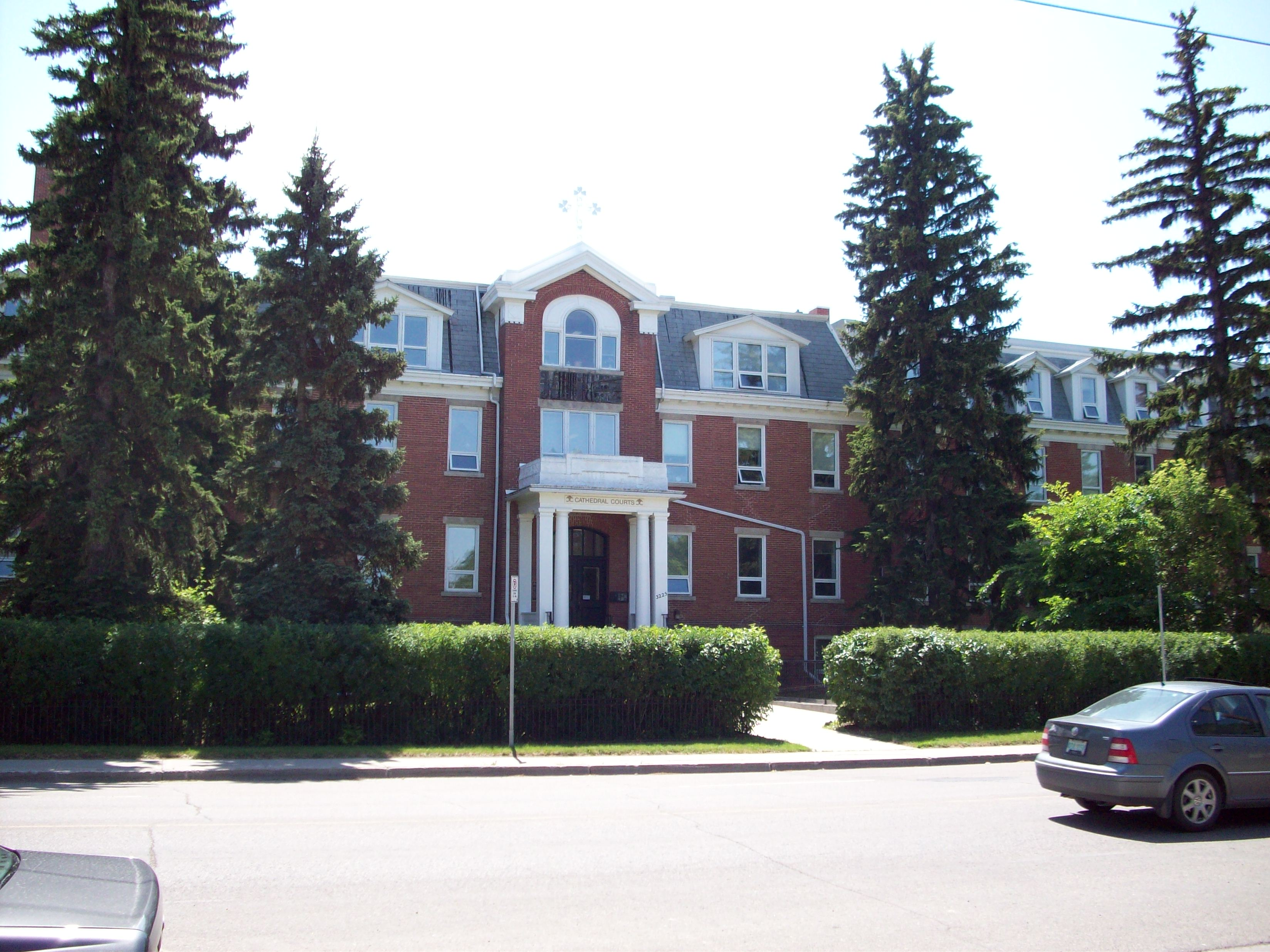
Former Sacred Heart Academy, now converted to private residences, though it also houses diocesan offices.

Immediately to the west of the Cathedral, across the closed Garnet Street, is the building that formerly housed Sacred Heart Academy, a girls' high school operated by the Sisters of Our Lady of the Missions, who also conducted music tuition for music students from across the city. The Sisters, whose numbers were waning, closed the school in 1969. The building has now been converted to strata title and sold as townhouses, but the Archdiocese has retained a portion of the east basement, once the piano studios, for offices.

== See also ==
- Our Lady of Assumption Co-Cathedral
- List of cathedrals in Canada
