= Donald Bolen =

Canadian Catholic archbishop

The Most Reverend Donald Bolen
- Archbishop of Regina
- Church: Roman Catholic Church
- Archdiocese: Regina
- See: Regina
- Appointed: 11 July 2016
- Installed: 14 October 2016
- Predecessor: Daniel Joseph Bohan
- Previous post: Bishop of Saskatoon (2009–16)

Orders
- Ordination: 12 October 1991
- Consecration: 25 March 2010 by Daniel Joseph Bohan

Personal details
- Born: Donald Joseph Bolen; 7 February 1961 (age 65) Gravelbourg, Saskatchewan, Canada
- Education: University of Regina; Saint Paul University; University of Oxford
- Motto: Mercy within mercy within mercy
- Coat of arms

Donald Joseph Bolen (born 7 February 1961) is a Canadian Catholic prelate who has served as Archbishop of Regina since 2016. He was previously Bishop of Saskatoon from 2009 to 2016.

== Biography ==
Bolen was born in Gravelbourg, Saskatchewan, in 1961.

=== Academics ===
- 1978–1984 (intermittently): B.A. Honours in religious studies at the University of Regina
- 1986–1989: B.Th. in theology, Saint Paul University, Ottawa
- 1989–1990, 1993–94: M.Th. and Licentiate in theology, Saint Paul University, Ottawa
- 1994–1997, 2000–2001: Work on D.Phil. in theology, University of Oxford

Bolen was ordained a priest in 1991 for the Archdiocese of Regina, and was consecrated as a bishop on 25 March 2010 for the Diocese of Saskatoon.

=== Ministry positions ===
- 1991–1993: Associate Pastor, Estevan
- 1994: Priest Moderator at Church of Our Lady, Moose Jaw
- 1997–1999: Priest Moderator, Milestone and Lang Parishes
- 1997–1999: Administrator, Paroisse St. Jean Baptiste, Regina
- 1997–2001: Faculty, Dept. of Religious Studies, Campion College, University of Regina
- 2000–2001: Priest Moderator, St. Jean-Baptiste, Regina
- 2001–2008: Staff member at the Pontifical Council for Promoting Christian Unity, Rome, staffing Anglican-Roman Catholic and Methodist-Roman Catholic relations and the preparation of texts for the Week of Prayer for Christian Unity. Served as Co-secretary of the Anglican-Roman Catholic International Commission (ARCIC), the International Anglican-Roman Catholic Commission for Unity and Mission (IARCCUM) and the Methodist-Roman Catholic International Commission.
- 2009: Nash Chair in Religion, Campion College, University of Regina
- 2009: Pastor of St. Joseph, Balgonie; St. Agnes, Pilot Butte; and St. Peter’s Colony, Kronau
- 2009: Vicar General of the Archdiocese of Regina
- 2010–2016: Bishop of Saskatoon
- Beginning in 2016: Archbishop of Regina

== Commissions and committees ==
- 1997–2001, 2009, Chair of Ecumenical Commission, Archdiocese of Regina

Canadian Conference of Catholic Bishops

- Beginning in 2018: Member of the Episcopal Commission for Christian Unity, Religious Relations with the Jews, and Interfaith Dialogue
- 2012–2019: Co-Chair of the Anglican-Roman Catholic Dialogue in Canada
- 2014–2018: Chairman of the Episcopal Commission for Justice and Peace
- 2011–2018: Member of the Episcopal Commission for Justice and Peace

International

- Beginning in 2012: Member of the Pontifical Council for Promoting Christian Unity
- Beginning in 2011: Co-Chair of the International Anglican-Roman Catholic Commission for Unity and Mission (IARCCUM)
- 2013–2016: Co-Chair of the Methodist-Roman Catholic International Commission
- 2009–2016: Member of the International Consultation Between the World Evangelical Alliance and the Catholic Church
- 2003–2008: Secretary of the International Anglican-Roman Catholic Commission for Unity and Mission (IARCCUM)
- 2003–2005: Secretary of the Anglican-Roman Catholic International Commission (ARCIC II)

== Honours ==
- 2008: Awarded the Cross of St Augustine by Archbishop of Canterbury Rowan Williams for service to relations between the Catholic Church and the Anglican Communion (2008)
- 2009: Nash Lecturer, Campion College, University of Regina
- 2014: Honorary Fellow of the College of Emmanuel and St. Chad, University of Saskatchewan
