= Olivier Elzéar Mathieu =

Canadian Roman Catholic priest, academic and Archbishop of Regina (1853–1929)

- Archbishop of Regina
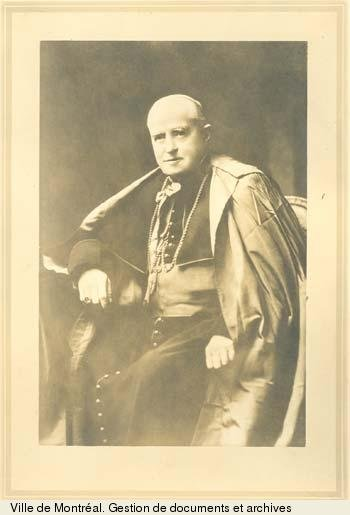
- Church: Catholic Church
- Archdiocese: Archdiocese of Regina
- In office: 21 July 1911 – 26 October 1929
- Predecessor: Diocese erected
- Successor: James McGuigan

Orders
- Ordination: 2 June 1878
- Consecration: 5 November 1911 by Louis-Nazaire Bégin

Personal details
- Born: 24 December 1853 Saint-Roch, Quebec City, Canada East, Province of Canada, British Empire
- Died: 26 October 1929 (aged 75)

Olivier Elzéar Mathieu (24 December 1853 – 26 October 1929) was a Canadian Roman Catholic priest, academic, and Archbishop of Regina.

== Biography ==
Born in Saint-Roch (Quebec City), the son of Joseph Mathieu and Marguerite Latouche, he studied at the Quebec Seminary and received a Doctor of Theology in 1878 from Université Laval. He was ordained a priest by Cardinal Elzéar-Alexandre Taschereau in 1878 and was appointed professor of philosophy at Laval University.

In 1882, he went to study in Borne, Italy and received a Doctor of Philosophy and Doctor of the Academy of Saint Thomas. Returning to Quebec, he received a Master of Arts in 1889. From 1899 to 1908, he was Rector of Université Laval.

Mathieu was appointed a Companion of the Order of St Michael and St George (CMG) during the visit to Canada of TRH the Duke and Duchess of Cornwall and York (later King George V and Queen Mary) in October 1901. He was later created a Knight of the Légion d'honneur.

In 1911, he was appointed Bishop of Regina and Archbishop of Regina in 1915.

Academic offices
Preceded by Joseph-Clovis-Kemner Laflamme	Rector of Université Laval; 1899–1908	Succeeded by Joseph-Clovis-Kemner Laflamme
Catholic Church titles
New diocese	Archbishop of Regina; 1911–1929	Succeeded by James Charles McGuigan
