= Archdiocese of Regina =

Catholic ecclesiastical territory

Coordinates: 50.4450°N 104.6260°W

Archdiocese of Regina Archidioecesis Reginatensis
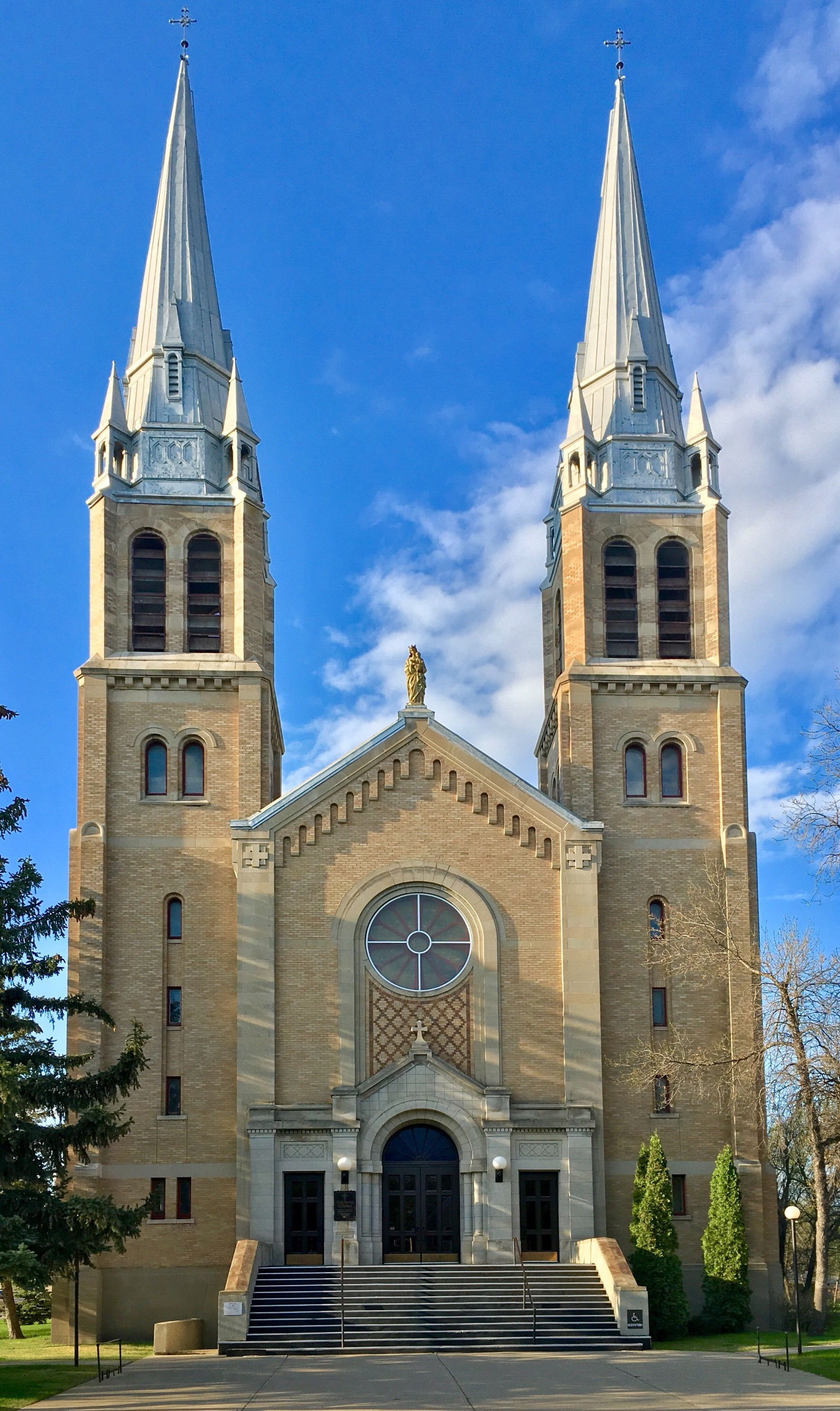
- Holy Rosary Cathedral

Location
- Country: Canada
- Ecclesiastical province: Saskatchewan
- Deaneries: 9

Statistics
- Area: 155,000 km^{2} (60,000 sq mi)
- Population: 124,000 (30.5%)
- Parishes: 158

Information
- Denomination: Catholic
- Sui iuris church: Latin Church
- Rite: Roman Rite
- Established: 1911
- Cathedral: Holy Rosary Cathedral
- Co-cathedral: Our Lady of Assumption Co-Cathedral, Gravelbourg

Current leadership
- Pope: Leo XIV
- Archbishop: Donald Bolen
- Suffragans: Prince Albert, Saskatoon
- Vicar General: Lorne Crozon, Brian Meredith
- Judicial Vicar: Thomas Nguyen

Map
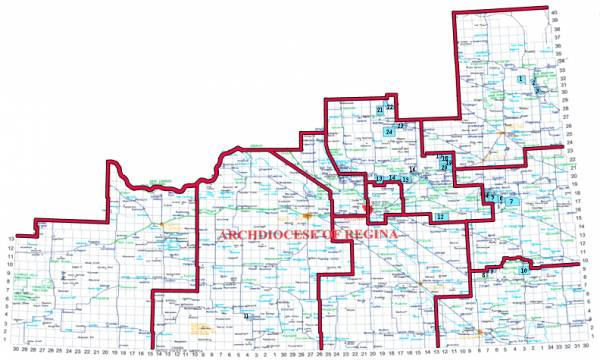
- Map of the Roman Catholic Archdiocese of Regina

Website
- archregina.sk.ca

The Roman Catholic Archdiocese of Regina (Latin: Archidioecesis Reginatensis) is a Roman Catholic archdiocese comprising the southern part of the Canadian province of Saskatchewan, as far north as the 30th township, or about 51°30' lat. The metropolitan province includes the suffragan dioceses of Prince Albert and Saskatoon. The seat of the diocese is in the city of Regina.

The Diocese of Regina was established on March 4, 1910, with Olivier Elzéar Mathieu as its first bishop. Only five years later, on December 4, 1915, Pope Benedict XV raised the diocese to an archdiocese. Its current archbishop, Donald Bolen, and staff now serve nearly 124,000 parishioners living in 158 parishes and missions scattered over more than 155,000 square kilometres in southern Saskatchewan. The archdiocese includes 9 deaneries.

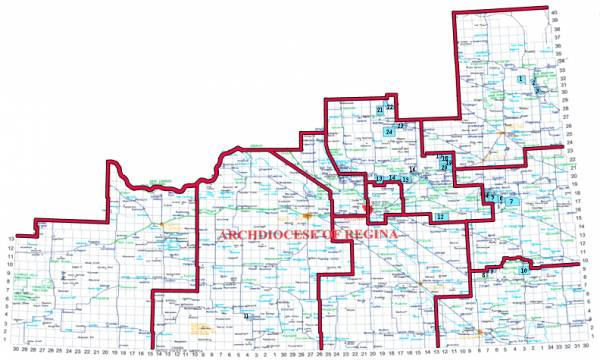

Construction on the diocese's Holy Rosary Cathedral in Regina extended from 1912 to 1917 and was dedicated to Our Lady of the Most Holy Rosary in November 1913. This extraordinary Romanesque building was built with an interior large enough to welcome parishioners and clergy from across southern Saskatchewan for special Masses, ordinations, funerals, weddings, and installations of archbishops.

In 1998, the former Diocese of Gravelbourg was merged with the archdiocese, with its former cathedral now designated Our Lady of Assumption Co-Cathedral.

== Bishops ==
The following is a list of the bishops and archbishops of Regina and their terms of service:

- Olivier Elzéar Mathieu (1911–1929)
- James Charles McGuigan (1930–1934), appointed Archbishop of Toronto, Ontario (Cardinal in 1946)
- Peter Joseph Monahan (1935–1947)
- Michael Cornelius O'Neill (1947–1973)
- Charles Aimé Halpin (1973–1994)
- Peter Joseph Mallon (1995–2005)
- Daniel Bohan (2005–2016)
- Donald Bolen (2016–present)

=== Other priest of this diocese who became bishop ===
- James Vernon Weisgerber, appointed Bishop of Saskatoon, Saskatchewan in 1996
