= Gregory Bittman =

Canadian Catholic bishop

- Bishop of Nelson
- Church: Catholic Church
- Diocese: Diocese of Nelson
- Appointed: 13 February 2018
- Predecessor: John Corriveau
- Previous posts: Titular Bishop of Caltadria (2012-2018); Auxiliary Bishop of Edmonton (2012-2018)

Orders
- Ordination: 15 August 1996
- Consecration: 3 September 2012 by Richard W. Smith

Personal details
- Born: Gregory John Bittman; 5 March 1961 (age 65)
- Coat of arms

Gregory Bittman is a prelate of the Roman Catholic Church and bishop of Nelson, British Columbia.

Gregory Bittman received the priestly ordination on 15 August 1996.

On 14 July 2012 an official news release from Vatican Information Service (VIS), an arm of the Holy See Press Office, stated that Pope Benedict XVI had appointed Father Gregory Bittman who, until then had been serving as the judicial vicar and as archdiocesan chancellor, as an auxiliary bishop of the Roman Catholic Archdiocese of Edmonton and titular bishop of Caltadria.

On 6 February 2018 Pope Francis appointed him the seventh Bishop of the Diocese of Nelson in southeastern British Columbia. He took possession of the Diocese on 25 April 2018.
