= Alfred Sinnott =

His Grace, The Most Reverend Arthur Alfred Sinnott
- Archbishop of Winnipeg
- Church: Roman Catholic Church
- See: Winnipeg
- Appointed: December 9, 1915
- Term ended: January 14, 1952
- Successor: Philip Pocock

Orders
- Ordination: February 18, 1900
- Consecration: September 21, 1916 by Luigi Ventura

Personal details
- Born: Arthur Alfred Sinnott; February 22, 1877 Crapaud, Prince Edward Island, Canada
- Died: April 18, 1954 Winnipeg, Manitoba
- Education: Prince of Wales College, Université Laval, Grand Séminaire de Montréal
- Motto: Dum Christus annuntietur (When Christ is being proclaimed)

Arthur Alfred Sinnott (February 22, 1877 – 18 April 1954) was a Canadian prelate of the Roman Catholic Church. He served as the inaugural Archbishop of Winnipeg from the archdiocese's creation in 1915 to 1952.

== Early life and career ==
Sinnott was born in Kelly's Cross (now part of Crapaud,) Prince Edward Island to John David Sinnott and Sarah Jane McAuley, a family of Irish descent.

Sinnott attended Prince of Wales College (predecessor of University of Prince Edward Island) and St. Dustan's College (later merged into UPEI) in Charlottetown, and earned his BA degree at Université Laval. He obtained a double degree in theology and canon law from the Grand Séminaire de Montréal, followed by post graduate studies in Rome. Sinnott was ordained a priest in 1900 by Archbishop Edmund Stonor at the Canadian Pontifical College in Rome. He returned to Canada in 1901 and taught at St. Dustan's College for two years before moving to Ottawa.

Sinnott's ecclesiastical career commenced in 1903, when he was named private secretary to Donato Sbarretti, who assumed the post of Apostolic Delegate to Canada and Newfoundland in December 1902 (and would later be made a Cardinal and head numerous departments in the Roman Curia). Following Sbarretti's appointment as secretary of the Congregation of Religious in 1910, Sinnott continued as private secretary to the next Papal Delegate Pellegrino Francesco Stagni. In 1907, Pope Pope Pius X bestowed Sinnott the honour title of Chaplain of His Holiness and the associated honorific Monsignor.

== Archbishop of Winnipeg ==
Sinnott was subject for speculation of bishop appointment during his service in the Apostolic Delegate in Ottawa as early as 1910.

During his service under Sbarretti, racial and language tension was rising in the Catholic community the province of Manitoba, then part of the vast Diocese of Saint-Boniface (at its initial formation covered the entire territory west of the Great Lakes and as far north as North Pole). Winnipeg's Catholics population, predominantly French speaking in the early days of confederation, grew rapidly in the 1890s with the influx of immigrants Irish and Eastern European backgrounds. In 1906, Winnipeg Catholics of Irish background petitioned then archbishop Adélard Langevin for, among other things, the creation of additional English parishes and an English-speaking suffragan bishop for Winnipeg. Langevin opposed the creation of a new bishop given the proximity to his own seat, but promised to erect two additional parishes. After failing to deliver on that promise, Winnipeg Catholics petitioned to Sbarretti, who in response instructed Langevin in 1908 to expedite the erection of those promised parishes. In light of slow progress, petitions were made addressed to Pope Benedict XV in 1915 in anticipation of Langevin's death requesting either an English speaking successor in the archbishopric or a suffragan bishop be appointed for the cities of Winnipeg and Brandon.

On December 4, 1915, Vatican announced the formation of the new Archdiocese of Winnipeg out of part of the Archdiocese of St. Boniface, and the appointment of Sinnott as it inaugural prelate. His assumption of the archbishopric took over a year. He was consecrated as a bishop by Staggni on September 21, 1916, with Archbishop Charles-Hugues Gauthier of Ottawa and Bishop John Thomas McNally of Calgary as co-consecrators. His installation was delayed until Christmas's Eve a year later, as the boundary between the two archdioceses was being disputed. While Vatican left Archdiocese of St. Boniface as a Metropolitan See, Winnipeg as the third largest city in Canada then was not made subject to St. Boniface, leading to Winnipeg's unique status as the only Latin Church diocese in Canada immediately exempt to the Holy See. While the installation was held at St. Mary's Cathedral, Sinnott did not officially designate it as the Archdiocese's seat until late 1918 due to ongoing uncertainties relating to large debts being transferred to the new Archdiocese.

A child of Irish immigrant and an energetic, engaged administrator, Sinnott was an impactful leader for the nascent yet rapidly growing archdiocese. He focused much effort in sourcing and establishing services supporting the large influx of Polish, Ukrainians, and other Eastern European immigrants of Catholic faith arriving in Winnipeg during his tenure. On accommodating the languages of worshipers, he diverged from his former superior Sbarretti, who preferred to anglicizing all dioceses with immigrants, and instead shared the views of his territorial predecessor Langevin in seeing offers to immigrant communities space to worship in their own languages and providing services in their languages as best strategies for preventing attrition and radicalization by communism. His approach was especially apparent in education, with initiatives ranging from Polish and Ukrainian parochial schools being established at selected parishes, to a Polish language and literature chair being created in the Winnipeg seminary.

Under Sinnott, the Archdiocese of Winnipeg built ninety churches, seven hospitals, three orphanages, and St. Paul's College, now an affiliated college with the University of Manitoba.

He served as the principal consecrator of Bishop Thomas Mary O’Leary of Springfield, Massachusetts in 1921, and as co-consecrator of Bishop Thomas O’Donnell of Victoria (later Archbishop of Halifax) and Bishop Francis Clement Kelley of Oklahoma City, both in 1924.

== Drawn out retirement ==
=== Succession plans ===
May In 1940, Pope Pius XII appointed Francis Ryder Wood, a relatively young priest serving as chancellor of the archdiocese, as auxiliary bishop of Winnipeg. Wood however resigned within a few years. (Note: Wood was active in ministry as late as May 1943 as reported in the Free Press, but resigned no later than March 1944, when his Titular Bishopric was succeeded by Giuseppe Siri, later a frontrunning papabile in four conclaves over 20 years, and the subject of conservative conspiracy theories.) In 1944, Gerald C. Murray, then Bishop of Saskatoon, was appointed by Pope Pius XII as coadjutor bishop of Winnipeg. Despite having been the archbishop for 28 years by then, Sinnott was only 67 at the time and did not wish to relinquish leadership. Bishop Murray worked out of St. Ignatius Church during his time in Winnipeg, predeceased Sinnott in 1951 and never succeeded the see.

Following Murray's death, Philip Pocock, also previously Bishop of Saskatoon, was appointed coadjutor bishop in August 1951. Sinnott resigned as Archbishop of Winnipeg shortly after on January 14, 1952, and was automatically succeeded by Pocock. Upon his retirement, Sinnott became the titular archbishop of Sebastea.

=== Death ===
Sinnott died in Winnipeg on 18 April 1954 and was buried in St. Mary's Cemetery. He is commemorated by the Sinnott Building at the University of Manitoba.

== Notes ==
Catholic Church titles
| Preceded by new creation | Archbishop of Winnipeg; December 9, 1915 – January 14, 1952 | Succeeded by Philip Francis Pocock |
| Preceded by George Joseph Caruana | Titular Archbishop of Sebastea; January 14, 1952 – April 18, 1954 | Succeeded by Luigi Punzolo |
