= Diocese of Churchill–Hudson Bay =

Catholic ecclesiastical territory

Coordinates: 58.7667°N 94.1667°W

Diocese of Churchill–Baie d’Hudson Dioecesis Churchillpolitana–Sinus de Hudson
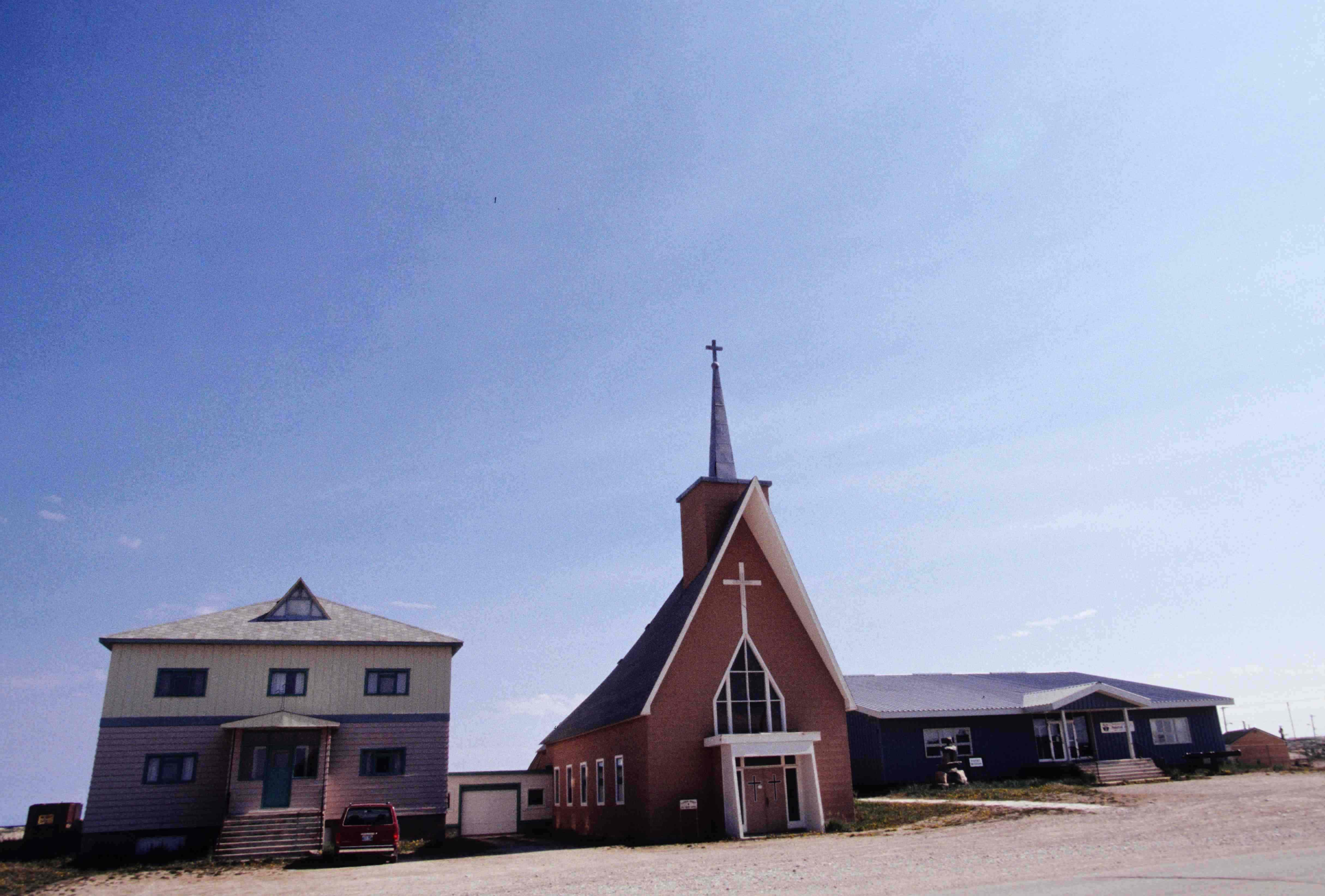
- Cathedral of the Holy Canadian Martyrs and Queen of Martyrs in 1999

- Logo of the Diocese

Location
- Country: Canada
- Ecclesiastical province: Keewatin–Le Pas
- Metropolitan: Keewatin–Le Pas
- Population: 8,300 (28.7%)

Information
- Denomination: Catholic
- Sui iuris church: Latin Church
- Rite: Roman Rite
- Cathedral: Cathédrale Saints-Martyrs-Canadiens-et-Reine-des-Martyrs

Current leadership
- Pope: Leo XIV
- Bishop: Wiesław Krótki
- Metropolitan Archbishop: Susai Jesu, OMI

Map

Website
- dioceseofchurchillhudsonbay.com

The Roman Catholic Diocese of Churchill–Hudson Bay (French Diocèse de Churchill–Baie d’Hudson, Latin: Dioecesis Churchillpolitana–Sinus de Hudson) is a Latin Catholic suffragan diocese in the ecclesiastical province of the Metropolitan Roman Catholic Archdiocese of Keewatin–Le Pas.

Its cathedral episcopal see is the Cathédrale Saints-Martyrs-Canadiens-et-Reine-des-Martyrs, dedicated to the Canadian Martyrs and the Queen of Martyrs, in Churchill, Manitoba.

== History ==
- Established on 1925.07.15 as Apostolic Prefecture of Hudson Bay (English) / Baie d’Hudson (French) / Sinus de Hudson (Latin), on territory split off from Apostolic Vicariate of Keewatin (now its Metropolitan)
- Promoted on 1931.12.21 as Apostolic Vicariate of Hudson Bay (English) / Baie d’Hudson / Sinus de Hudson (Latin)
- Lost territory on 1945.07.13 to establish the then Apostolic Vicariate of Labrador
- Promoted on 1967.07.13 as Diocese of Churchill / Churchillpolitan(us) (Latin)
- Renamed on 1968.01.29 as Diocese of Churchill–Hudson Bay (English) / Churchill–Baie d’Hudson / Churchillpolitan(us)–Sinus de Hudson (Latin).

== Statistics and extent ==
As per 2014, it pastorally served 10,370 Catholics (30.5% of 34,023 total) on 2,300,000 km^{2} in 13 parishes and 8 missions with 3 priests (diocesan), 1 deacon and 2 lay religious (2 sisters).

It includes the northeastern part of the federal Province of Manitoba and all except the western extremity of the Territory of Nunavut.

As of 2004, the diocese had 17 parishes, 7 religious priests and 7,900 Catholics, 2 Women Religious, 8 Religious Brothers and 1 permanent deacon.

== Bishops ==
=== Ordinaries ===
(all Roman Rite)

Apostolic Prefect of Hudson Bay

- Fr. Louis-Eugène-Arsène Turquetil, Missionary Oblates of Mary Immaculate (born France) (O.M.I.) (1925.07.15 – 1931.12.15 see below)

Apostolic Vicars of Churchill-Hudson Bay

- Louis-Eugène-Arsène Turquetil (see above 1931.12.15 – retired 1942.12.18), Titular Bishop of Ptolemais in Phœnicia (1931.12.15 – death 1955.06.14)
- Marc Lacroix, O.M.I. (first Canadian incumbent) (1942.12.18 – 1967.07.13 see below), Titular Bishop of Rhosus (1942.12.18 – 1967.07.13)

Suffragan Bishops of Churchill

- Marc Lacroix (see above 1967.07.13 – 1968.01.29 see below)

Suffragan Bishops of Churchill-Hudson Bay

- Marc Lacroix (see above 1968.01.29 – retired 1968.10.25), emeritate as Titular Bishop of Chullu (1968.10.25 – resigned 1970.11.24), died 1976
- Omer Alfred Robidoux (1970.03.07 – death 1986.11.12)
- Reynald Rouleau (1987.05.15 – retired 2013.02.16)
- Anthony Wiesław Krótki (born Poland) (16 February 2013 - ... ).

=== Coadjutor bishop ===
- Armand Clabaut, O.M.I. (1937-1940), as Coadjutor Vicar Apostolic; did not succeed to see

== See also ==
- List of Catholic dioceses in Canada
