= The Streets Were Not Paved With Gold =

1993 book by Carbone

- Author: Stanislaò "Stan" Carbone
- Language: English
- Genre: Non-fiction
- Publisher: Manitoba Italian Heritage Committee
- Publication date: 1993
- Publication place: United States

The Streets Were Not Paved With Gold: A Social History of Italians in Winnipeg is a 1993 non-fiction book by Stanislaò "Stan" Carbone, published by the Manitoba Italian Heritage Committee. It discusses the Italian-Canadian community in Winnipeg, Manitoba. The title refers to the mistaken belief that Canada was, in Carbone's words, "a land of gold", and that the immigrants there were wealthy. Carbone argues that Italian immigrants found it difficult to adjust to the capitalism found in Canadian society.

== Contents ==
In "Emigration and Italian Society", Carbone describes the pre-immigration conditions and statuses of the Italians who moved to Winnipeg. J. E. Rea of the University of Manitoba Department of History stated that in addition to analyzing the reasons why Italians immigrated, the book also discusses demographic patterns and Italian Canadian entrepreneurial activities.

== Reception ==
Rea described his own review of The Streets Were Not Paved With Gold as being "entirely negative"; Rea criticized the book having "not enough" information on the Italian community and the lack of development of certain details, such as the relationship between the Italian church in Winnipeg and the Roman Catholic Archdiocese of Winnipeg, possible issues caused by the small size of the Italian community, and information about Italian organizations.
