= Philip Pocock =

- Archbishop of Toronto
- Church: Catholic Church
- Archdiocese: Archdiocese of Toronto
- In office: 30 March 1971 – 27 April 1978
- Predecessor: James McGuigan
- Successor: Gerald Emmett Carter
- Previous posts: Titular Archbishop of Isauropolis (1961-1971); Coadjutor Archbishop of Toronto (1961-1971); Archbishop of Winnipeg (1952-1961); Titular Archbishop of Aprus (1951-1952); Coadjutor Archbishop of Winnipeg (1951-1952); Bishop of Saskatoon (1944-1951)

Orders
- Ordination: 14 June 1930
- Consecration: 29 June 1944 by Ildebrando Antoniutti

Personal details
- Born: Philip Francis Pocock; 2 July 1906 St. Thomas, Ontario, Dominion of Canada
- Died: 6 September 1984 (aged 78)
- Buried: Holy Cross Catholic Cemetery, Thornhill, Ontario

Philip Francis Pocock (2 July 1906 – 6 September 1984) was the Roman Catholic Archbishop of Toronto from 1971 to 1978.

== Early years ==
Pocock was born in St. Thomas, Ontario, on 2 July 1906. After studying theology at St. Peter's Seminary, London, Ontario, Bishop Denis P. O’Connor of Peterborough ordained him as a priest on 14 June 1930 at St. Peter's Cathedral, London. He worked in two parishes until 1933. In 1933 he left his parish to study canon law in Rome (graduating with a doctorate in canon law from the Angelicum University in 1934). He became a professor at St. Peter's Seminary, teaching moral theology and canon law until 1944.

On 7 April 1944, he was appointed Bishop of Saskatoon, Saskatchewan, after he was consecrated in St. Peter's Cathedral, London, by Most Reverend Ildebrando Antoniutti, Apostolic Delegate of Canada. He served in this position for seven years. On 16 June 1951 he was named Apostolic Administrator of the Archdiocese of Winnipeg. On 6 August 1951 he was appointed Coadjutor Archbishop of Winnipeg and Titular Archbishop of Aprus. The following year he succeeded as Archbishop of Winnipeg in January 1952.

== Later years in Toronto ==
In 1961, Pocock left Winnipeg and became Coadjutor Archbishop of Toronto on 16 February 1961 and Titular Archbishop of Isauropolis to assist the then ailing archbishop, Cardinal James Charles McGuigan until his resignation on 30 March 1971. He succeeded as Archbishop of Toronto on 30 March 1971 and served until he resigned on 29 April 1978. During his tenure in Toronto Archbishop Pocock created the Archdiocesan Pastoral Council and the Senate of Priests. He encouraged the laity to participate in church decisions, the liturgy, and the Church's charitable works. Two Auxiliary Bishops, Thomas Fulton and Aloysius Ambrozic, were consecrated, and forty-five new parishes were established. Because of United Way's support of Planned Parenthood, Archbishop Pocock withdrew the Council of Catholic Charities and established ShareLife as a Catholic alternative. He lobbied for legislation against pornography and encouraged interfaith relations.

=== Return to parish work ===
He returned to life as a parish priest at St Mary's Parish in Brampton, Ontario. At St. Mary's, Pocock remained active as a priest by celebrating mass and confirmations and visiting a senior citizens' home. Upon his retirement, he was given the title of Archbishop Emeritus of Toronto.

He died on 6 September 1984 and was interred in Holy Cross Cemetery in Thornhill, Ontario.

Catholic Church titles
Preceded by Gerald C. Murray	Bishop of Saskatoon; 1944–1951	Succeeded by Francis Joseph Klein
Preceded by Arthur Hughes	Titular Archbishop of Aprus; 1951–1952	Succeeded by Antonios Grigorios Voutsinos
Preceded by Arthur Alfred Sinnott	Archbishop of Winnipeg; 1952–1961	Succeeded by George Bernard Flahiff
Preceded by Jean-Baptiste Urrutia	Titular Archbishop of Isauropolis; 1961–1971	Vacant
Preceded by James Charles McGuigan	Archbishop of Toronto; 1971–1978	Succeeded by Gerald Emmett Carter
