= Ovide Charlebois =

Canadian Roman Catholic bishop

Venerable Ovide Charlebois OMI
- Apostolic Vicar of Keewatin
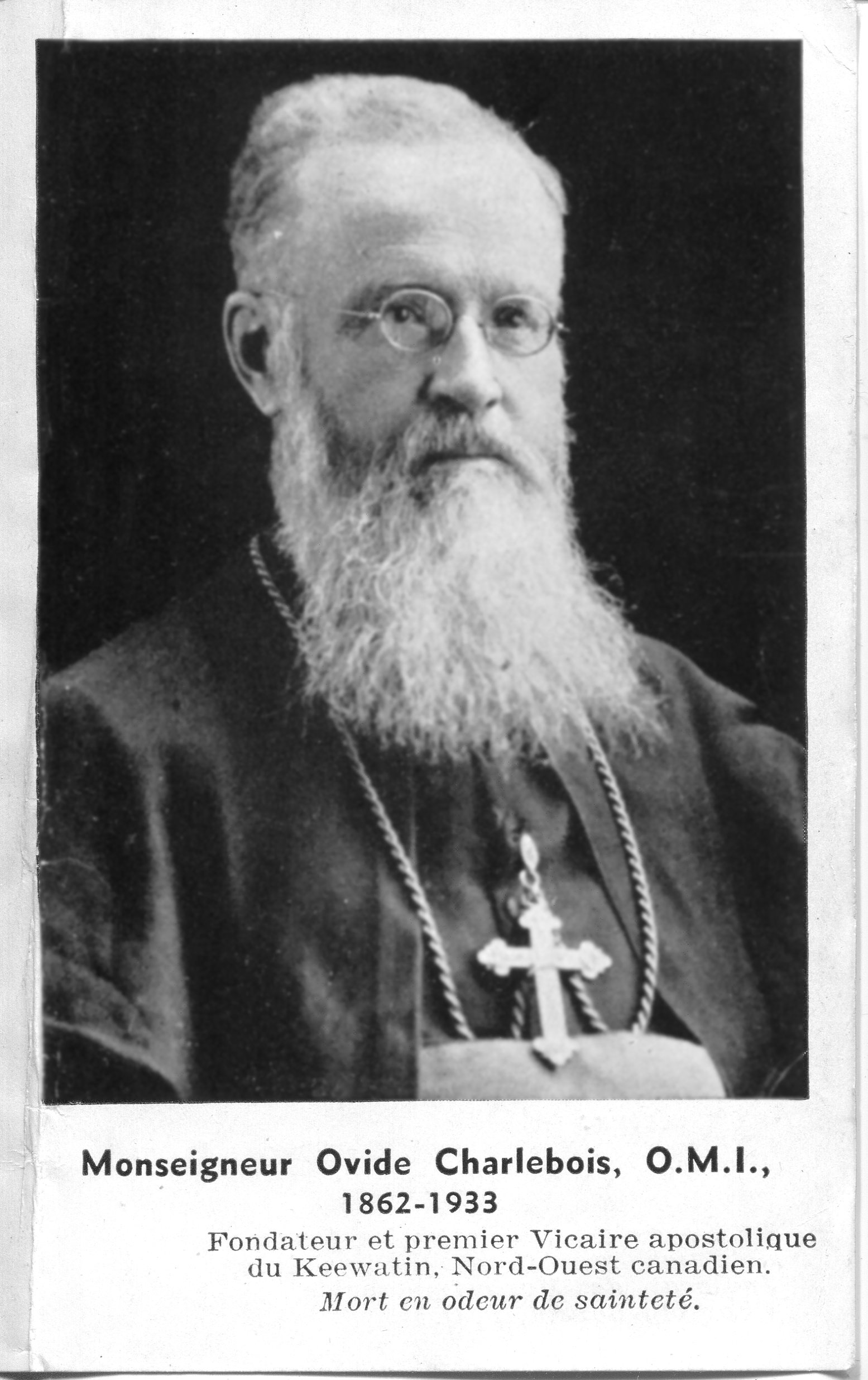
- Church: Roman Catholic Church
- See: Keewatin
- Appointed: 8 August 1910
- Installed: 7 March 1911
- Term ended: 20 November 1933
- Successor: Martin Joseph-Honoré Lajeunesse
- Other post: Titular Bishop of Berenice (1910-33)

Orders
- Ordination: 17 July 1887 by Vital-Justin Grandin
- Consecration: 30 November 1910 by Louis Langevin

Personal details
- Born: Ovide Charlebois; 12 February 1861 Oka, Québec, Canada
- Died: 20 November 1933 (aged 71) Le Pas, Manitoba, Canada
- Buried: Notre-Dame du Sacré-Coeur cathedral
- Education: University of Ottawa
- Motto: Ad Jesum per Mariam

Ordination history of Ovide Charlebois
History
Priestly ordination
- Ordained by: Vital-Justin Grandin
Episcopal consecration
- Principal consecrator: Louis Philip Adélard Langevin
- Co-consecrators: Joseph Alfred Archambault; Alexis-Xyste Bernard
Episcopal succession
Bishops consecrated by Ovide Charlebois as principal consecrator
- Martin Joseph-Honoré Lajeunesse: 29 June 1933

Ovide Charlebois, OMI (17 February 1862 - 20 November 1933) was a Canadian Missionary Oblate of Mary Immaculate who served as the Apostolic Vicar of Keewatin from his appointment in 1910 until his death. Charlebois worked in the missions first in the nation's northwest and was noted for his extensive travels across Saskatchewan to visit isolated minorities in order to teach them catechism and to minister to those who were open to converting to the faith. His appointment as a bishop allowed him greater freedom as he was able to build new chapels and schools across his apostolic vicariate which he divided into three for greater management. Charlebois was considered a pioneer for his dedication and contribution to education and infrastructure in his apostolic vicariate where he established chapels and schools. He taught catechism on a regular basis in the various schools that he visited and also established a newspaper in order to better connect the more isolated communities.

The beatification process for the late prelate launched in the 1950s and he became titled as a Servant of God. It remained inactive until it was re-launched in the late 1970s thus allowing for it to continue. Pope Francis titled him as venerable on 28 November 2019.

== Life ==
Ovide Charlebois was born in Oka on 17 February 1862 as the seventh of fourteen children to the poor Hyacinthe Charlebois and Émérente Chartier-Robert; he was baptized after his birth as "William-Ovide". He moved soon after his birth to Saint-Benoît in Mirabel and then in 1864 settled in Sainte-Marguerite-du-Lac-Masson just outside of Terrebonne.

From 1876 until 1882 he attended the Collège de l'Assomption before he entered the Marian Oblate novitiate in Lachine in Montreal. He made his initial profession in 1883 and then began his theological and philosophical studies at both the College of Ottawa and the Saint-Joseph Scholasticae. Charlebois made his solemn profession into the order in 1884 before receiving the tonsure in 1886. He received his ordination to the priesthood on 17 July 1887 from Bishop Vital-Justin Grandin in Ottawa.

His assignment to the missions first started on 2 September 1887 upon being sent for the first time to Le Pas where he would work at Cumberland House. Charlebois expressed his willingness to go there to minister but indicated his fear of being alone and in complete isolation. In 1890 he established a school where he would teach catechism to children. He returned to Le Pas a short while later in order to minister to those indigenous and Métis populations who expressed an interest in the faith at a time when the population in that particular area was less than one hundred people; he also ministered to these populations that were dispersed thus requiring him to travel on a regular basis in order to reach these isolated communities. In the 1900-01 winter period he estimated that he travelled 3000 miles via dogsled and snowshoe and camped outside in the now at least 35 times. His mission in Saskatchewan ended in 1903 at which point he became the director for the Industrial School at Lac Aux Canards; he remained in this position until 1920 which also happened to span during his time as a bishop. He also - in 1903 - became the principal for Saint Michael's Indian Residential School at Duck Lake where he taught catechism and also among the Cree population. He also made it an objective to reduce the school's debt which he managed to achieve. In Duck Lake he founded a French-language newspaper to serve the isolated communities in order to better connect them to each other and began planning for this in December 1908. The paper Le Patriote de l'Ouest was launched in August 1910 but resumed publication in June 1911 after a fire ruined the printing equipment in November 1910.

His activities in providing additional infrastructure for the people saw him build the Le Pas mission house in 1897 in addition to a little log cabin that was to serve as a chapel. This work took him around two weeks to complete with wood he was able to get from further north. He slept in his attic - which was quite small - from its construction until 1911 as he did his work in the missions. In 1907 discussions were held about establishing an apostolic vicariate and Archbishop Louis Langevin put his name forward to be made its first bishop. Charlebois was named the first Apostolic Vicar for Keewatin on 8 August 1910 in addition to being named as the Titular Bishop of Berenice. Charlebois received his episcopal consecration on 30 November 1910 in L'Assomption from Archbishop Langevin (he was installed in his new see on 7 March 1911); the principal co-consecrators were Bishops Joseph Alfred Archambault and Alexis-Xyste Bernard. He began his first pastoral visit in his episcopate in May 1911 (this would last five months in total) and would travel on foot in addition to rail and wagon though on occasion needed to travel via a canoe in order to reach areas that were often difficult to enter or traverse. He often had to go through forested areas and would sleep on the ground in a small canvas tent during his travels. In 1911 a residence was constructed that was to become the episcopal residence but he loaned it instead to some nuns so that their order could run the first hospital in that area. He lived in its basement until the formal episcopal residence was constructed in 1927. In 1915 he split the vicariate into three districts each under the direction of a superior in order for better management of the vicariate overall.

In 1923 he travelled 1000 miles via canoe and walked 80 miles during his travels in addition to having slept 23 nights in the open. In 1925 he organized the first ecclesial missions located at Hudson Bay. He also authorized a mission at Eskimo Point in Arviat in 1925. His boat twice almost capsized in Lake Winnipeg in 1927 while he was returning from a month-long visit to the missions in Norway House and Cross Lake. Towards the end of his life he became obsessed with condemning communism.

In 1933 he was attending a general meeting of the national bishops in Québec when he became ill. He was taken to hospital as soon as he returned to Le Pas and died there on 20 November. He requested that he be given a pauper's burial and his own coffin cost $40. His remains were transferred to the Notre-Dame du Sacré-Coeur cathedral in 1955. The elders would recount that upon his burial a flock of doves were observed taking flight. His nephew Martin Joseph-Honoré Lajeunesse (who was his coadjutor) succeeded him as apostolic vicar for the see.

== Beatification process ==
Local preliminaries for Charlebois's beatification began on 26 November 1952. The cause remained inactive until 13 April 1978 after the Congregation for the Causes of Saints issued the official "nihil obstat" (no objections) decree. The second process to investigate the prelate's life and saintliness opened on 16 September 1979 and closed sometime later at which stage the C.C.S. validated the two previous processes in Rome on 6 June 1986 as having complied with their rules for conducting these processes. The official Positio dossier was submitted to the C.C.S. on 28 April 2001. Pope Francis titled Charlebois as venerable on 28 November 2019. The postulator for this cause is the Oblate priest Diego Saez.

== Writings ==
Charlebois published one set of writings:

- Débuts d'un évêque missionnaire
