= George Flahiff =

Canadian Catholic prelate (1905–1989)

His Eminence George Flahiff C.S.B.
- Archbishop Emeritus of Winnipeg
- Church: Roman Catholic Church
- Archdiocese: Winnipeg
- See: Winnipeg
- Appointed: 10 March 1961
- Installed: 26 June 1961
- Term ended: 31 March 1982
- Predecessor: Philip Francis Pocock
- Successor: Adam Joseph Exner
- Other post: Cardinal-Priest of Santa Maria della Salute a Primavalle (1969–89)
- Previous posts: Superior General of Congregation of Saint Basil (1954–61); President of the Canadian Episcopal Conference (1964–67)

Orders
- Ordination: 17 August 1930 by Neil McNeil
- Consecration: 31 May 1961 by James Charles McGuigan
- Created cardinal: 28 April 1969 by Pope Paul VI
- Rank: Cardinal-Priest

Personal details
- Born: George Bernard Flahiff; 26 October 1905 Paris, Ontario, Canada
- Died: 22 August 1989 (aged 83) Saint Michael's Hospital, Toronto, Ontario, Canada
- Education: Saint Michael's College; University of Strasbourg
- Motto: In ipso per ipsum cum ipso

Styles of George Flahiff
- Reference style: His Eminence
- Spoken style: Your Eminence
- Religious style: Cardinal
- Posthumous style: none
- Informal style: Cardinal
- See: Winnipeg

George Bernard Flahiff, CC, C.S.B. (26 October 1905 – 22 August 1989) was a Canadian prelate of the Roman Catholic Church. He served as Archbishop of Winnipeg from 1961 to 1982, and was elevated to the cardinalate in 1969.

== Early life and education ==
One of nine children, George Flahiff was born in Paris, Ontario; his father was an innkeeper. He attended St. Jerome's College in Kitchener from 1920 to 1921, and then studied at St. Michael's College in Toronto, from where he obtained a Bachelor of Arts degree in 1926. One of his professors at St. Michael's was Lester B. Pearson, the future Prime Minister who encouraged Flahiff to follow a career in diplomacy. Flahiff instead joined the Congregation of St. Basil (also known as the Basilian Fathers) in 1926, making his first profession on 20 September 1927.

== Priesthood ==
After three years' study of theology at St. Basil's Seminary in Toronto, Flahiff was ordained to the priesthood by Archbishop Neil McNeil on 17 August 1930. He then furthered his studies in France at the University of Strasbourg (1930–1931) and at the École des Chartes (1931–1935). Upon his return to Canada, Flahiff taught history and art at the Pontifical Institute of Medieval Studies from 1935 to 1954. During that time, he also served as a professor of history at the University of Toronto (1940–1954) and Secretary of the Institute of Mediaeval Studies (1943–1951).

Flahiff became a member of the general council of the Basilian Fathers on 6 July 1948. He was elected local superior of the Basilians on 1 July 1951, and later superior general of the entire congregation on 6 July 1954. Reelected as superior general on 14 June 1960, he also served as President of the Canadian Religious Conference from 1959 to 1961.

== Episcopal career ==
On 10 March 1961, Flahiff was appointed Archbishop of Winnipeg by Pope John XXIII. He received his episcopal consecration on the following May 31 from Cardinal James Charles McGuigan, with Archbishops Philip Francis Pocock and Michael Cornelius O'Neill serving as co-consecrators, at St. Michael's Cathedral.

Flahiff was created a cardinal by Pope Paul VI in 1969. In 1974, he was made a Companion of the Order of Canada.

Flahiff was one of the Council Fathers at Vatican II and played a key role in the writing of several Conciliar documents.

The Cardinal Flahiff Building, which is part of University of St. Michael's College within the University of Toronto, is named after him.

== See also ==
Catholic Church titles
Preceded by Philip Francis Pocock	Archbishop of Winnipeg; 1960–1982	Succeeded by Adam Joseph Exner
