= Gerald Murray =

Gerald Murray may refer to:

- Gerald C. Murray (1885–1951), Canadian Roman Catholic bishop
- Gerald R. Murray (born 1956), United States Air Force airman
