= Francis Carroll (bishop of Calgary) =

Canadian Roman Catholic bishop (1890–1967)

The Most Reverend Francis Patrick Carroll
- Bishop of Calgary
- Church: Roman Catholic Church
- Diocese: Diocese of Calgary
- Appointed: 19 December 1935
- Term ended: 28 December 1966
- Predecessor: Peter Joseph Monahan
- Successor: Francis Joseph Klein

Orders
- Ordination: 2 June 1917
- Consecration: 19 February 1936 by James Charles McGuigan

Personal details
- Born: 7 July 1890 Toronto, Ontario, Canada
- Died: 25 February 1967 (aged 76) Calgary, Alberta, Canada
- Denomination: Roman Catholic

Francis Patrick Carroll (7 July 1890 – 25 February 1967) was a Canadian Roman Catholic prelate, who served as Bishop of the Diocese of Calgary from 1935 until 1966.

== Early life and education ==
Carroll was born in Toronto, Ontario, on 7 July 1890. He was educated at St. Francis School and St. Michael's College in Toronto before continuing his ecclesiastical studies. He later studied philosophy and theology in preparation for the priesthood.

== Priesthood ==
Carroll was ordained to the priesthood on 2 June 1917 at St. Michael's Cathedral in Toronto. He later served in academic and administrative roles, including at St. Augustine's Seminary in Scarborough.

== Bishop of Calgary ==
On 19 December 1935, Carroll was appointed Bishop of Calgary by Pope Pius XI. He was consecrated on 19 February 1936 by Cardinal James Charles McGuigan.

During his episcopate, the diocese experienced significant growth in parishes, schools, and Catholic institutions throughout southern Alberta. He participated in the first session of the Second Vatican Council (1962–1965).

Carroll's resignation as Bishop of Calgary was accepted on 28 December 1966, and he was appointed Titular Bishop of Horrea.

== Legacy ==
Bishop Carroll High School in Calgary, Alberta, was named in his honour in recognition of his contributions to Catholic education in the region.

== Death ==
Carroll died on 25 February 1967 in Calgary, Alberta, at the age of 76.
