= Croteau (surname) =

Croteau is a Francophone surname.

People with this name include:

- Danny Croteau (1958–1972), American murder victim
- Denis Croteau (born 1932), Canadian Roman Catholic bishop
- François Croteau (born 1972), Canadian politician
- Gary Croteau (born 1946), Canadian hockey player
- Julie Croteau (born 1970), first woman to play NCAA men's baseball, first woman to coach NCAA Division I men's baseball
- Marie-Danielle Croteau (born 1953), Canadian author
- Maxime Brinck-Croteau (born 1986), Canadian fencer
- Nathalie Croteau (1966–1989), victim of anti-women mass murder
- Nicole Croteau (born 1992), U.S. musician
