= James Weisgerber =

The Most Reverend Vernon Weisgerber
- Archbishop Emeritus of Winnipeg
- Archdiocese: Winnipeg
- Installed: August 24, 2000
- Term ended: October 28, 2013
- Predecessor: Leonard James Wall
- Successor: Richard Gagnon
- Other post: Bishop of Saskatoon (1996–2000)

Orders
- Ordination: June 1, 1963
- Consecration: May 3, 1996

Personal details
- Born: May 1, 1938 (age 88) Vibank, Saskatchewan, Canada

Vernon James Weisgerber OC SOM (born May 1, 1938) is a Canadian prelate of the Roman Catholic Church. He is the retired sixth archbishop of Winnipeg, serving from August 2000 until October 2013.

== Early life and education ==
Weisgerber was born in Vibank, Saskatchewan, to Jack and Catherine Weisgerber. Following his schooling at Vibank, he attended St. Peter's College at Muenster and then Saint Paul University in Ottawa, where he obtained licence degrees in Philosophy and Theology.

== Priesthood ==
He was ordained a priest at Holy Rosary Cathedral in Regina on June 1, 1963, and named a prelate of honour on October 16, 1991.

Weisgerber was Dean of Arts at Notre Dame College in Wilcox, where he taught philosophy, religious studies, and French. He worked several years in the archbishop of Regina's office serving as the director of the pastoral and social justice offices. He served as rector of Holy Rosary Cathedral and pastor of Holy Trinity Parish, both in Regina, as well as in Fort Qu'Appelle, which included pastoral ministry with neighboring aboriginal communities.

In 1990 he was elected general secretary of the Canadian Conference of Catholic Bishops.

== Episcopal career ==
On March 7, 1996, Weisgerber was appointed the fifth bishop of Saskatoon by Pope John Paul II. He received his episcopal consecration on the following May 3 from Archbishop Peter Mallon, with Archbishop Joseph MacNeil and Bishop Joseph MacDonald serving as |co-consecrators.

Weisgerber was later named the sixth archbishop of Winnipeg on June 7, 2000. He succeeded Leonard James Wall, and was installed at St. Mary's Cathedral on August 24, 2000. In 2005, he received the Saskatchewan Order of Merit. In 2013, he was made an Officer of the Order of Canada "for his work as a champion of reconciliation and social justice, promoting deeper understanding between Aboriginal and non-Aboriginal people".

Catholic Church titles
| Preceded by James Patrick Mahoney | Bishop of Saskatoon; 1996–2000 | Succeeded by Albert LeGatt |
| Preceded by Leonard James Wall | Archbishop of Winnipeg; 2000–2013 | Succeeded by Richard Gagnon |
