= Marieval, Saskatchewan =

Community in Saskatchewan, Canada

Coordinates: 50.362°N 102.402°W

Location of Marieval in Saskatchewan

Marieval ("Valley of Mary" in French) is a hamlet in Saskatchewan, Canada. It is at the eastern end of Crooked Lake along the Qu'Appelle River.

The hamlet was the location of the former Marieval Indian residential school, which was part of the Canadian Indian residential school system. In June 2021 at least 600 and up to 751 unmarked graves were found at the community cemetery, located near the site of the former school and formerly overseen by the Roman Catholic Church, the most found in Canada to date. Chief Cadmus Delorme said these graves may have had marks in 1960, but the headstones were removed by representatives of the Catholic Church and by 2021 they were unmarked. Delorme noted that "removing headstones is a crime in this country" and also said "We cannot affirm that they are all children but there are oral stories that there are adults in this gravesite as well. Because it was the Roman Catholic church that overseen this gravesite, some may have went to the church and from our local towns and they could have been buried here as well."

== See also ==
- List of communities in Saskatchewan
