= James Patrick Mahoney =

James Patrick Mahoney (December 7, 1927 – March 2, 1995) was the first priest of the Roman Catholic Diocese of Saskatoon to become its Bishop. A well known teacher, preacher, and pastor, Bishop Mahoney oversaw the Diocese during the turbulent years following the Second Vatican Council. Bishop James Mahoney High School in Saskatoon, opened in 1984, is named in his honour.

He was born in Saskatoon in 1927, and educated in Saskatoon at St. Paul's Elementary School, City Park Collegiate, and St. Peter's Seminary in London, Ontario, to train for the priesthood. He was the son of Denis and Anna Mahoney who were pillars of the Cathedral Parish of St. Paul. Remarkably, he received Baptism, First Confession, First Communion, Confirmation, Ordination to Deaconate, Presbyterate, and Episcopate, all in the same church. Deeply rooted in the city he was beloved of the whole of Saskatoon.

Preceded by Francis Joseph Klein	Bishop of Saskatoon; 1967—1995	Succeeded by James Vernon Weisgerber
