= Marieval Indian Residential School =

School in Canada (1899–1997)

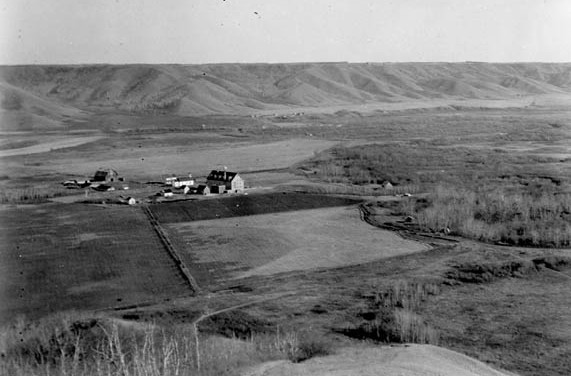
- The school in 1923

Location
- Marieval; Saskatchewan; Canada; 50°34′50.2″N 102°39′27.7″W

Information
- Former names: Crooked Lake Boarding School (1899); Cowessess Boarding School (1909); Cowessess Indian Residential School (1924–1968); Cowessess Student Residence (1969); Marieval Student Residence (1969–1981); Marieval Community Education Centre & Student Residence (1977); Marieval Community Education Centre (1981–1987); Cowessess Community Education Centre (1987); Cowessess Student Residence (1997)
- Type: Canadian Indian residential school
- Religious affiliation: Catholic
- Opened: December 19, 1898; 127 years ago
- Status: Closed (demolished)
- Closed: June 30, 1997; 29 years ago
- Authority: Catholic Church in Canada (1899–1969); Government of Canada (1969–1987); Cowessess First Nation (1987–1997)
- Oversight: Crown–Indigenous Relations and Northern Affairs Canada
- Grades: K–12
- Gender: Coed
- Language: English, French

The Marieval Indian Residential School was part of the Canadian Indian residential school system. Located on the Cowessess 73 reserve in Marieval, Saskatchewan, it operated from 1898 (Note: The school has been widely reported as operating from 1899, however both the National Centre for Truth and Reconciliation and the Government of Canada list an opening date of December 19, 1898. In the latter, the annual report for 1899 from the Department of Indian Affairs details that the school opened on December 19, 1898, but that the building had not yet been completed so operations took place elsewhere.) to 1997. It was located in Qu'Appelle Valley, east of Crooked Lake and 24 km (15 mi) north of Broadview.

In June 2021, 751 unmarked graves were found on the school grounds by the Cowessess First Nation, the most found in Canada to date according to the Federation of Sovereign Indigenous Nations (FSIN), which represents Saskatchewan's First Nations. This marks the third discovery of unmarked graves in Canada in 2021, following the discovery of 215 unmarked anomalies at the Kamloops Indian Residential School the previous month.

== History ==
The school opened on December 19, 1898. The school was first run by four sisters of the Congregation of Our Lady of the Missions and subsequently by the Sisters of Saint Joseph of Saint-Hyacinthe from 1901 to 1979. In its first year of operation, the school had an enrollment of 14 students, with the capacity to accommodate 45 students. The government of Canada took over running the school in 1969, having funded it since 1901. The Cowessess First Nation ran the school starting in 1987. The school was closed on June 30, 1997, and subsequently demolished in 1999 and replaced with a day school.

Enrollment at the school peaked during the 1962–1963 academic year, with 148 residents and 89 day students. At the school, students were only allowed to visit their parents on Sundays—a practice that ended with a new principal in 1933. Since then, children were permitted to visit their parents only under special circumstances. Students had their hair cut when they arrived at the school, and each student was assigned a number, which was used when staff members became upset. There was an expectation of staff to "physically dominate their students".

== Discovery of unmarked graves ==
The Truth and Reconciliation Commission of Canada had reported in 2015: "Throughout the history of Canada’s residential school system, there was no effort to record across the entire system the number of students who died while attending the schools each year. The National Residential School Student Death Register, established by the Truth and Reconciliation Commission of Canada, represents the first national effort to record the names of the students who died at school. The register is far from complete . . . " The federal budget assigned in 2019 $33.8 million over 3 years to develop and maintain the National Residential School Student Death Register, formally opened in September 2020 with an initial list of 2,800 names.

The community cemetery predates the school, having been first used in 1885, though the school was built adjacent to the cemetery. It contains the remains of both children and adult Catholic parishioners. However by 2021, only an estimated third of the graves had remained marked. The archbishop of Regina Don Bolen said that the loss of headstones occurred at least partly in the 1960s when an Oblate priest and a local First Nations chief "entered into a conflict" and the priest then used a bulldozer to knock over "huge numbers of tombstones." One person claiming relatives in the cemetery said he knew the workers who picked up the headstones. In 2019, the Archdiocese of Regina provided the Cowessess First Nation $70,000 to identify the unmarked graves and restore the cemetery.

In May 2021, the Cowessess First Nation announced they would search the site using ground-penetrating radar in collaboration with a group from Saskatchewan Polytechnic. The search was planned two years earlier, but was delayed by the COVID-19 pandemic; it eventually started on May 31, 2021 and was expanded four times after anecdotes from elders that bodies had been buried past the school grounds. On June 23, 2021, hundreds of unmarked graves were announced to have been located at the school, the most found in Canada to date according to the Federation of Sovereign Indigenous Nations (FSIN), which represents Saskatchewan's First Nations. The total number of graves was announced as 751 in a press conference the next day, over three times higher than the 215 discovered in Kamloops the previous month. A total of 44,000 m^{2} (470,000 sq ft) was searched, with each of the 751 "recorded hits" possibly indicating more than one body. However, because this site is also known to contain the remains of band members and people from outside the community, the proportion of the 751 recorded hits that could relate to the residential school is unknown at this time. It was claimed that at least 600 of the detections likely correspond to actual graves, since the radar technology had an error rate of 10–15%. The bodies were not part of a mass grave; rather, headstones had been removed by representatives of the Catholic Church in the 1960s.

On October 8, 2021, Cowessess announced that they had identified 300 of the 751 likely gravesites after consulting the records of the RCMP, the Catholic Church, and Indigenous and Northern Affairs Canada, as well as community members' oral stories.

Further investigation took a pause until 2022 to allow for media interest to die down and for researchers to get their bearings. More advanced ground-penetrating radar technology was used on a livestock barn constructed by the nuns. This investigation showed readings that were "off the charts" according to lead researcher Barbara Lavallee, and they had to try a new tactic to further the search. After participating in a Sun Dance ceremony, Lavallee was inspired to hire cadaver dogs to investigate the site. The dogs seemed confused and moved everywhere around the four areas of interest and barn. Lavallee recalls their handler interpreting this to mean that "the dog does not know where to start because the human scent is so strong." It was later discovered that the nuns had poured a concrete floor in the barn, which may have confused the dogs.^{:160-3}

The research team were able to acquire an even more advanced ground-penetrating radar system, the kind used to investigate Ancient Egyptian tombs. They also scoured the Cowessess records at Université de Saint-Boniface and the National Centre for Truth and Reconciliation to construct a timeline of school attendance to get at who might be buried on the grounds. Further investigations at the barn began in early fall 2022.^{:161-3}

=== Reactions ===
Premier of Saskatchewan Scott Moe expressed his support for the families of the deceased in a written statement. Premier of Ontario Doug Ford tweeted "My heart aches for Indigenous communities with news of more unmarked grave sites and hundreds more children who never returned home. We must confront and learn from this horrific side of history, including here in Ontario, so families may find the closure they deserve." Perry Bellegarde, National Chief of the Assembly of First Nations, wrote in a tweet that the discovery was "absolutely tragic, but not surprising". In Saskatoon, the city's flags are planned to be lowered to half-mast on June 24, 2021. Bobby Cameron, chief of the Federation of Sovereign Indigenous Nations, said, “This was a crime against humanity ... The only crime we committed as children was being born Indigenous ... We had concentration camps here. We had them here in Saskatchewan. They were called Indian residential schools.” Donald Bolen, archbishop of the Roman Catholic Archdiocese of Regina, apologized for the church's actions and said they would help provide information.

Prime Minister of Canada Justin Trudeau responded that the findings were "Canada's responsibility to bear" then offered his sympathy. In response, Marion Buller, chief commissioner for the National Inquiry into Missing and Murdered Indigenous Women and Girls, dismissed Trudeau's words as "thoughts and prayers" and asked for "concrete action" instead. New Democratic Party leader Jagmeet Singh asked the federal government to implement all 94 recommendations of the Truth and Reconciliation Commission of Canada.

In the wake of the Marieval and Kamloops discoveries, various communities in British Columbia, Ontario, New Brunswick, and Nunavut have decided to cancel Canada Day celebrations for 2021, opting instead for subdued events or time for reflection. The CN Tower in Toronto was lit orange on Canada Day in a show of support for Indigenous communities.

In the days following the discovery, the St. Paul's Co-Cathedral in Saskatoon was covered in graffiti, consisting of the words "we were children" surrounded by red handprints and fake blood smears. Further, as of June 27, four Catholic churches (St Ann's Church, Chopaka Church, the Sacred Heart Church and St. Gregory's Church) on First Nations land in western Canada were destroyed by fire within the last week, in blazes considered suspicious by local authorities.

The Missionary Oblates of Mary Immaculate, the Catholic organization that operated this school, along with 48 others, announced shortly after the findings that they would disclose all historical documents in its possession.

== See also ==
- List of Indian residential schools in Canada
- Bon Secours Mother and Baby Home, maternity home in Ireland where 800 children were found in unmarked graves
- Florida School for Boys, school where dozens of children were found in unmarked graves
- Kamloops Indian Residential School, school where 215 unmarked anomalies were found in May 2021
- Medomsley Detention Centre, a British prison for young males where over 1,800 living former inmates reported sexual and physical abuse by staff
