= Archdiocese of Keewatin–Le Pas =

Catholic ecclesiastical territory

Coordinates: 53.8279°N 101.2520°W

Metropolitan Archdiocese of Keewatin–Le Pas Archidioecesis Metropolitae Kivotina–Passitana

Location
- Country: Canada
- Ecclesiastical province: Keewatin–Le Pas

Statistics
- Population: (as of 2006); 41,869 (40.4%)
- Parishes: 49

Information
- Denomination: Catholic
- Sui iuris church: Latin Church
- Rite: Roman Rite
- Established: 4 March 1910
- Cathedral: Our Lady of the Sacred Heart Cathedral
- Secular priests: 3

Current leadership
- Pope: Leo XIV
- Archbishop: Mons. Dr. Soosai Jesu, O.M.I., D.D., Ph.D., Th.D.
- Metropolitan Archbishop: Mons. Dr. Soosai Jesu, O.M.I., D.D., Ph.D., Th.D.
- Bishops emeritus: Sylvain Lavoie

Map

Website
- archdioceseofkeewatinlepas.ca

The Roman Catholic Metropolitan Archdiocese of Keewatin–Le Pas (Latin: Archidioecesis Metropolitae Kivotina–Passitana) is a Roman Catholic archdiocese that includes parts of the Provinces of Manitoba, Saskatchewan, and Ontario and has the suffragan diocese of Churchill-Baie d'Hudson.

Prior to 2018, it included as suffragan dioceses the Diocese of Labrador City-Schefferville dissolved in 2007 and the Diocese of Moosonee dissolved in 2018.

As of 2006, the archdiocese contains 49 parishes, 3 active diocesan priests, 15 religious priests, and 42,000 Catholics. It has 3 religious nuns.

The seat of the diocese is at Our Lady of the Sacred Heart Cathedral in The Pas.

== History ==
This largely barren land of lakes and forests, possessing timber and mineral resources but sparsely inhabited by First Nations, Métis and a few Europeans, was first visited by pioneer missionaries in the nineteenth century, when Norbert Provencher, Bishop of St. Boniface, sent Jean-Baptiste Thibault to Île-à-la-Crosse (1845), Louis-Francois Richer Lafleche (later Bishop of Three Rivers) to explore the Cumberland district (1846) and Alexandre-Antonin Taché (later Archbishop of St. Boniface), to join Lafleche at Ile-à-la-Crosse (1846), and thence visit Reindeer Lake (1847). These and surrounding missions were subsequently served by Oblates of the Manitoba or Alberta-Saskatchewan Provinces.

The Apostolic Vicariate of Keewatin (Latin: Vicariatus Apostolicus Keevatinensis) was a Roman Catholic missionary pre-diocesan jurisdiction in northern Canada which included the northern half of the Province of Saskatchewan, and was bounded on the north by the Arctic regions, on the south by the Roman Catholic Archdiocese of Saint-Boniface, on the east by the then Apostolic Vicariate of Temiskaming, and on the west by the Diocese of St Albert and the then Apostolic Vicariate of Athabasca.

Prominent among these since 1887 has been Ovide Charlebois whose administrative capacities, proved during sixteen years' ministry at Fort Cumberland, led in 1900 to his nomination as Visitor of the Cumberland District Indian Missions, in 1903, to his appointment as director of Saint Michael's Indian Industrial School at Duck Lake (Saskatchewan), and in 1910 to his preconization as titular Bishop of Berenice and Vicar Apostolic of Keewatin, with residence at The Pas.

There were in the vicariate in the early 20th century 15 Oblate Fathers of Mary Immaculate, 8 Oblate Brothers of Mary Immaculate, 12 Grey Nuns (Montreal), 16 Oblate Sisters of the Sacred Heart and Mary Immaculate (St. Boniface), 4 more Grey Nuns (St. Hyacinth), 10 churches with 16 out-stations; 11,000 Indians, Dene, Cree and Inuit, of whom 7000 were Catholics and 5000 non-Catholics or pagans (chiefly Inuit religion). Indian boarding schools at Norway House (Oblate Sisters, 20 pupils), Beauval Residential School at Lac La Plonge [Grey Nuns (Montreal), 50 pupils], a general hospital at Le Pas [Grey Nuns (St. Hyacinth), 25 beds], a Catholic (French-English) school at Le Pas [Grey Nuns (St. Hyacinth)].

It was renamed and promoted Metropolitan See of Keewatin-Le Pas in 1967; its archbishop now has an ecclesiastical province. After the Diocese of Labrador City-Schefferville was suppressed in 2007, the province had two suffragan dioceses—Churchill-Baie d'Hudson and Moosonee. The Diocese of Hearst–Moosonee was erected on 3 December 2018 through the unification of the Diocese of Hearst and the Diocese of Moosonee, and that new diocese is a suffragan diocese in the ecclesiastical province of the metropolitan Archdiocese of Ottawa-Cornwall.

== Bishops ==
=== Diocesan bishops ===
The following is a list of the bishops and archbishops of Keewatin-Le Pas and their terms of service:

- Ovide Charlebois, O.M.I. (1910–1933)
- Martin Giuseppe Onorio LeJeunesse, O.M.I. (1933–1954)
- Paul Dumouchel, O.M.I. (1955–1986)
- Peter Alfred Sutton, O.M.I. (1986–2006)
- Sylvain Lavoie, O.M.I. (2006–2012)
- Murray Chatlain (2012–2024)
- Susai Jesu, O.M.I. (2025-current)

=== Coadjutor bishops ===
- Martin Joseph-Honoré Lajeunesse, O.M.I. (1933), as Coadjutor Vicar Apostolic
- Peter Alfred Sutton, O.M.I. (1986)
- Sylvain Lavoie, O.M.I. (2005–2006)

== See also ==
- List of Indian residential schools in Canada
