= Diocese of Mackenzie–Fort Smith =

Catholic ecclesiastical territory

Coordinates: 62.4500°N 114.4000°W

Diocese of Mackenzie–Fort Smith Dioecesis Mackenziensis–Arcis Smith
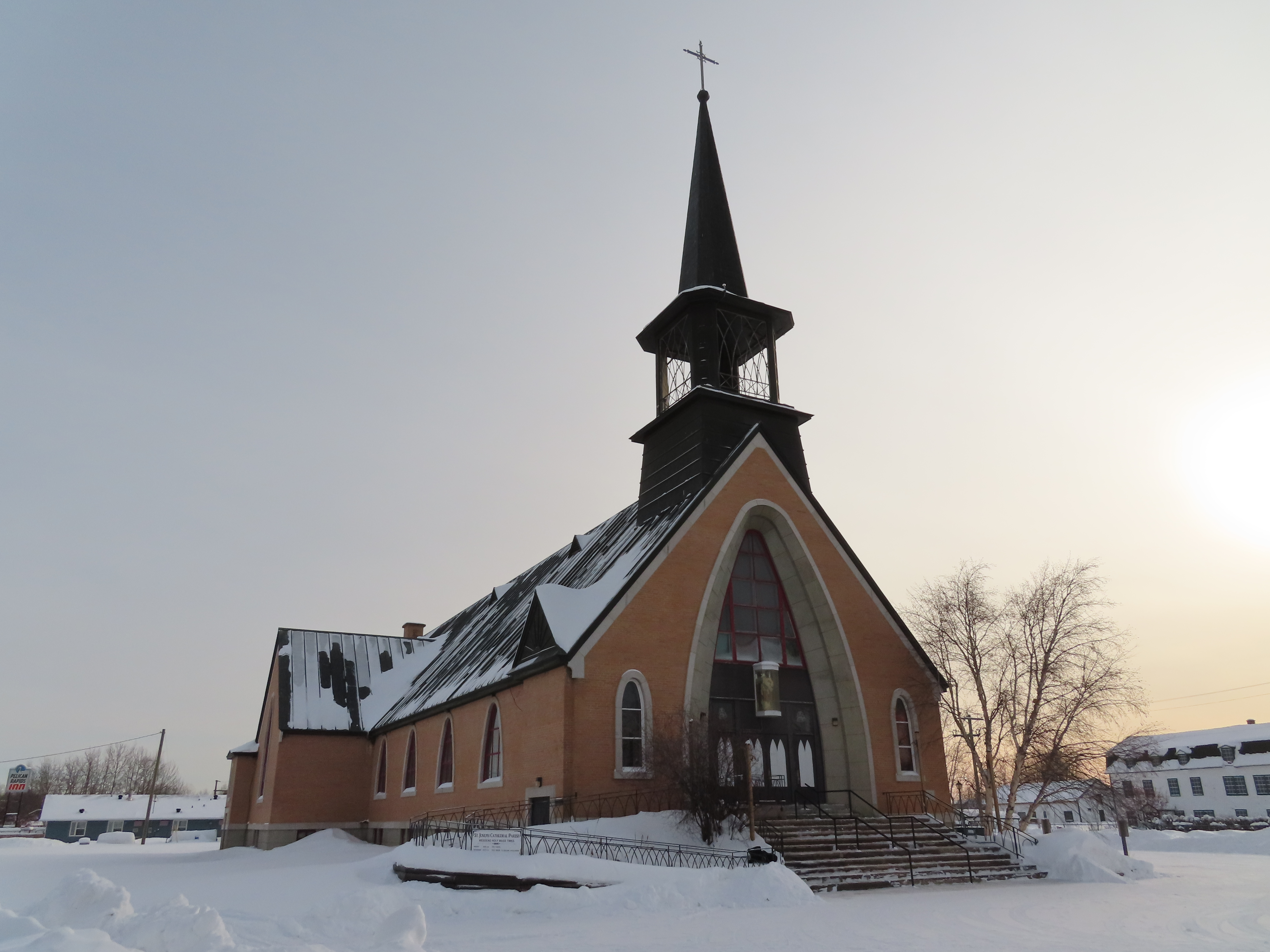
- St. Joseph's Cathedral, Fort Smith

Location
- Country: Canada
- Ecclesiastical province: Grouard-McLennan
- Headquarters: Yellowknife

Statistics
- Area: 1,303,400 km^{2} (503,200 sq mi)
- Population: 16,500 (32%)

Information
- Denomination: Catholic
- Sui iuris church: Latin Church
- Rite: Roman Rite
- Cathedral: St. Joseph Cathedral

Current leadership
- Pope: Leo XIV
- Bishop: Jon Hansen, C,Ss.R.
- Metropolitan Archbishop: Charles Duval, C.Ss.R.
- Bishops emeritus: Denis Croteau

Map

Website
- mfsdiocese.ca

The Diocese of Mackenzie–Fort Smith (Latin: Dioecesis Mackenziensis–Arcis Smith) is a Latin Church ecclesiastical territory or diocese of the Catholic Church that includes the Northwest Territories and the extreme west of the Territory of Nunavut in Canada. Bishop Jon Hansen,C.Ss.R. currently serves as Bishop of Mackenzie – Fort Smith, Canada.

Originally created in 1901 as the Vicariate Apostolic of Mackenzie, it was elevated to a full episcopal see in 1967.

In 2021 the border of the diocese changed, losing the Athabasca region in northern Saskatchewan. After that the number of parishes and missions is up to 26. In 2025 the number of incardinated priests was 2 (1 retired outside the diocese) and 2 permanent deacons both outside the diocese.

== Bishops ==
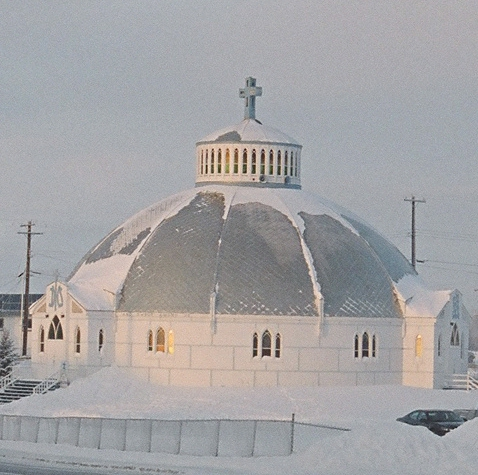
Inuvik's famous "Igloo Church"

=== Diocesan bishops ===
==== Vicariate Apostolic of Mackenzie ====
- Gabriel-Joseph-Elie Breynat, O.M.I. (1901–1943), "The Bishop of the Winds", Titular Bishop of Adramyttium (1901) and Titular Archbishop of Garella (1939)
- Joseph-Maria Trocellier, O.M.I. (1943–1958)
- Paul Piché, O.M.I. (1959–1967)

The following is a list of the bishops of Mackenzie-Fort Smith and their terms of service:

- Paul Piché (1967–1986)
- Denis Croteau (1986–2008)
- Murray Chatlain (2008–2012), appointed Archbishop of Keewatin-Le Pas, Manitoba
- Mark Hagemoen (2013–2017), appointed Bishop of Saskatoon, Saskatchewan
- Jon Hansen, C.Ss.R (December 15, 2017)

=== Coadjutor bishops ===
- Pierre-Armand-Albert-Lucien Fallaize, O.M.I. (1931-1939), as Coadjutor Vicar Apostolic; did not succeed to see
- Joseph-Marie Trocellier, O.M.I. (1941-1943), as Coadjutor Vicar Apostolic
- Murray Chatlain (2007-2008)
