= Francis Joseph Klein =

Canadian Catholic bishop (d. 1968)

- Bishop of Calgary
- Church: Catholic Church
- Diocese: Diocese of Calgary
- In office: 25 February 1967 – 3 February 1968
- Predecessor: Francis Carroll
- Successor: Paul John O’Byrne
- Previous post: Bishop of Saskatoon (1952-1967)

Orders
- Ordination: 2 September 1934 by James McGuigan
- Consecration: 30 April 1952 by James McGuigan

Personal details
- Born: 6 August 1911 Sedley, Saskatchewan, Dominion of Canada, British Empire
- Died: 3 February 1968 (aged 56)

Francis Joseph Klein (born 1911 in Sedley, Saskatchewan) was a Canadian Catholic clergyman and prelate for the Diocese of Saskatoon, and later for Calgary. He was appointed bishop in 1952. He died in 1968.
