= Holy Cross Catholic Cemetery, Thornhill =

Holy Cross Catholic Cemetery
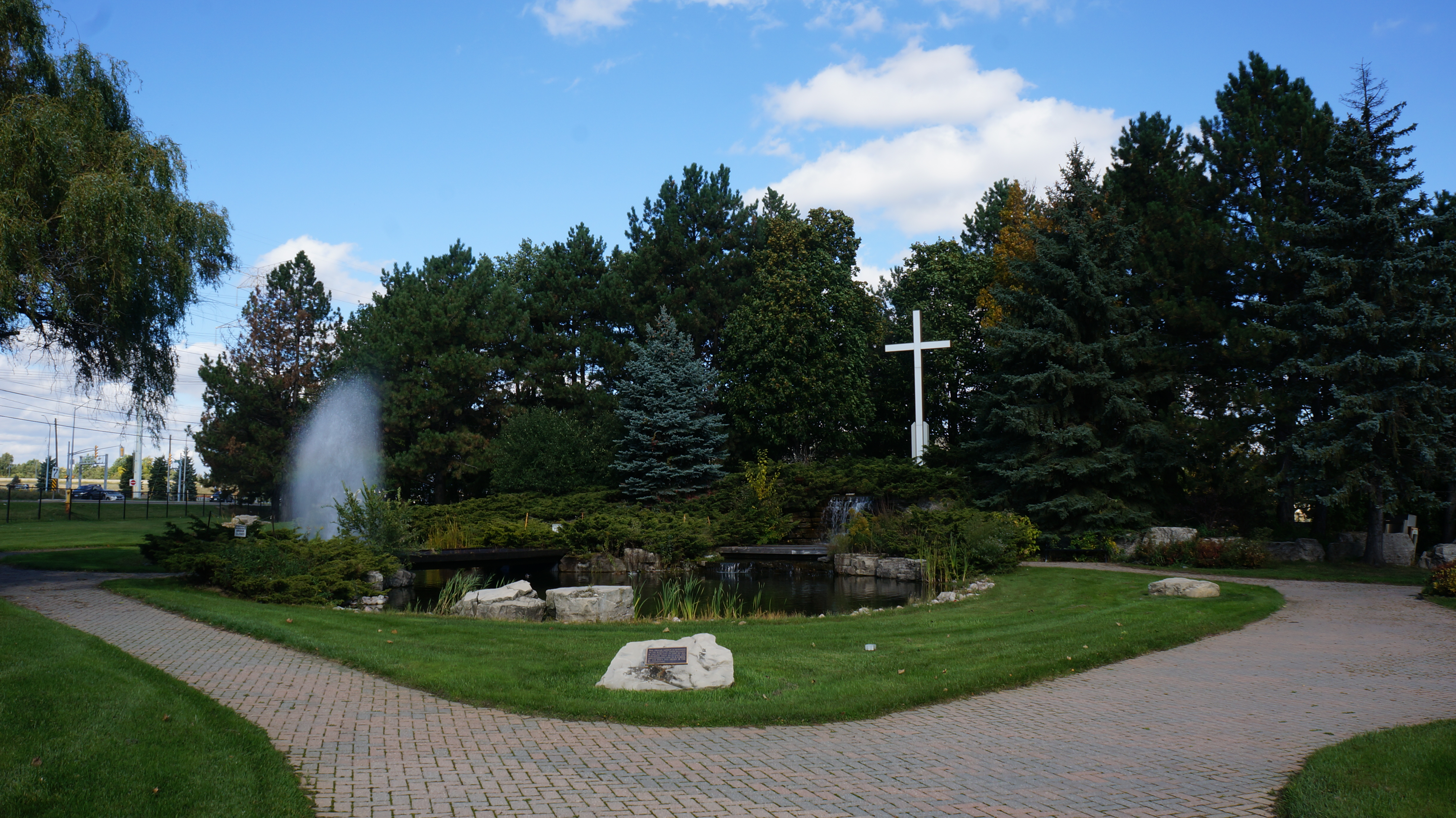
- Interactive map of Holy Cross Catholic Cemetery

Details
- Established: 1954
- Location: Thornhill, Ontario
- Country: Canada
- Coordinates: 43°49′58″N 79°25′05″W
- Type: Roman Catholic
- Size: 145-acre (590,000 m^{2})
- Find a Grave: Holy Cross Catholic Cemetery

Holy Cross Catholic Cemetery is a cemetery in Thornhill, Ontario, Canada. It is owned and operated by the Roman Catholic Archdiocese of Toronto.

== History ==
Holy Cross Catholic Cemetery opened in 1954 to handle growth of Catholics in Toronto requiring a Catholic burial in the greater Toronto area.

It is named for the universal symbol of Christianity.

Besides the crypt at St. Michael's, St. Paul's (cemetery operated from 1822 to 1857) and St. Mary's Church (emergency cholera burials from 1832 to 1834 predated the first church built in 1835) were the only churches with an attached cemetery within Toronto. St. Michael's Cemetery opened in 1855 as a larger and stand alone burial grounds. Mount Hope Catholic Cemetery was opened to relieve St. Michael's in 1900 and was the last to be located within Toronto.

Holy Cross is responsible for St. Luke's Roman Catholic Cemetery c. 1846. Located off John Street next to Thornhill Cemetery and Ukrainian Catholic Church of Saint Volodymyr (formerly St. Luke's Roman Catholic Church).

== Notable interments ==
- Carl Brewer
- G. Raymond Chang
- Milt Dunnell
- Frank Lenti
- Marshal McLuhan
- Jack Tunney
- Domenic Racco
- Emanuel Jaques
- Charles Sauriol

The cemetery is the resting place of the more recent and former Archbishop of Toronto:

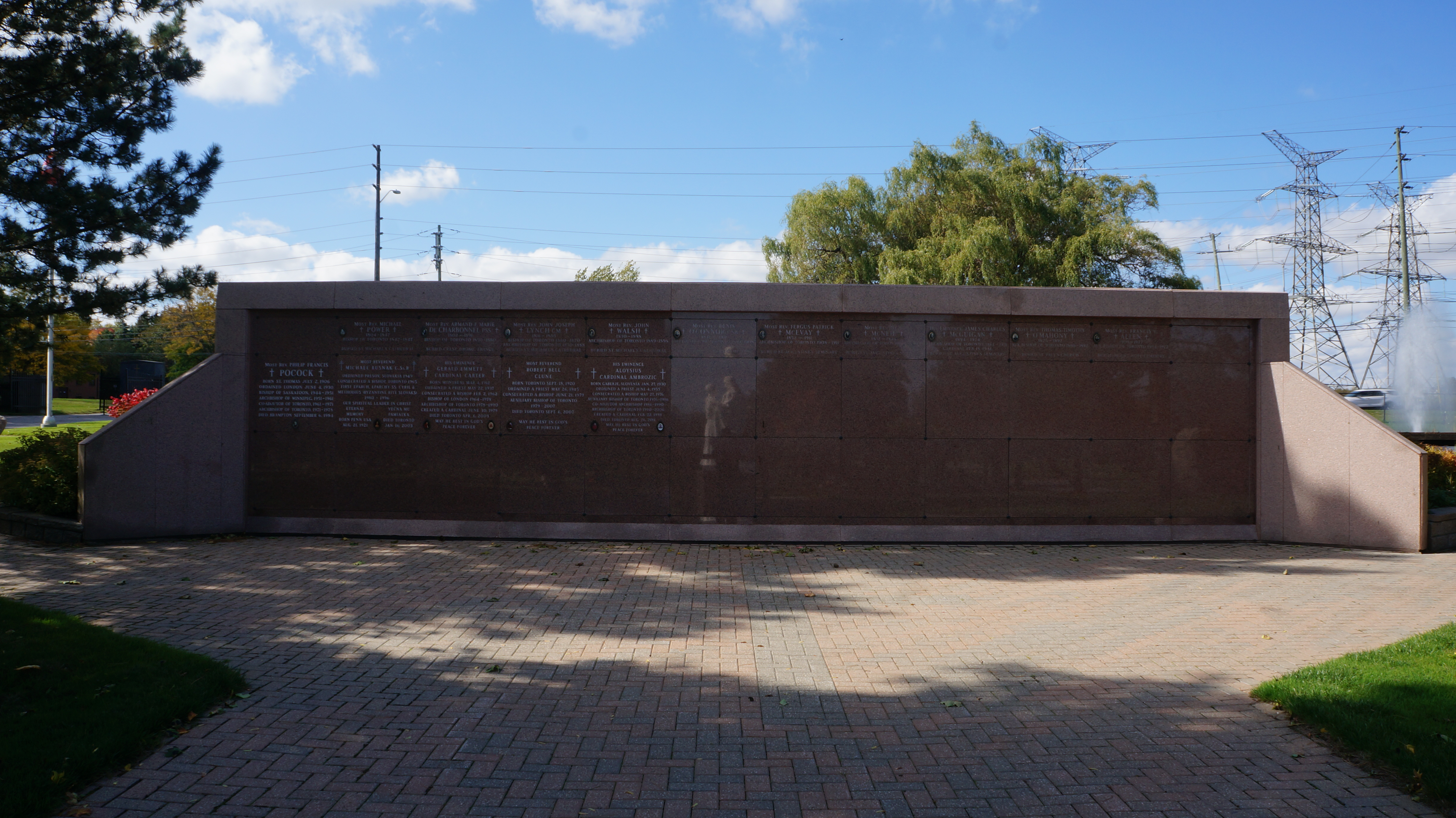
Bishop's Mausoleum

- Philip Pocock d. 1984
- Gerald Emmett Carter d. 2003
- Aloysius Ambrozic d. 2011

== See also ==
- St. Augustine's Seminary
- Mount Hope Catholic Cemetery
- St. Michael's Cathedral Basilica (Toronto)
- St. Paul's Basilica, former site of St. Paul's Cemetery 1822 to 1857 (last burial)
- St. Michael's Cemetery (Toronto)
