= St. Paul's Cathedral (Saskatoon, Saskatchewan) =

Coordinates: 52°07′39″N 106°39′29″W

St. Paul's Co-Cathedral
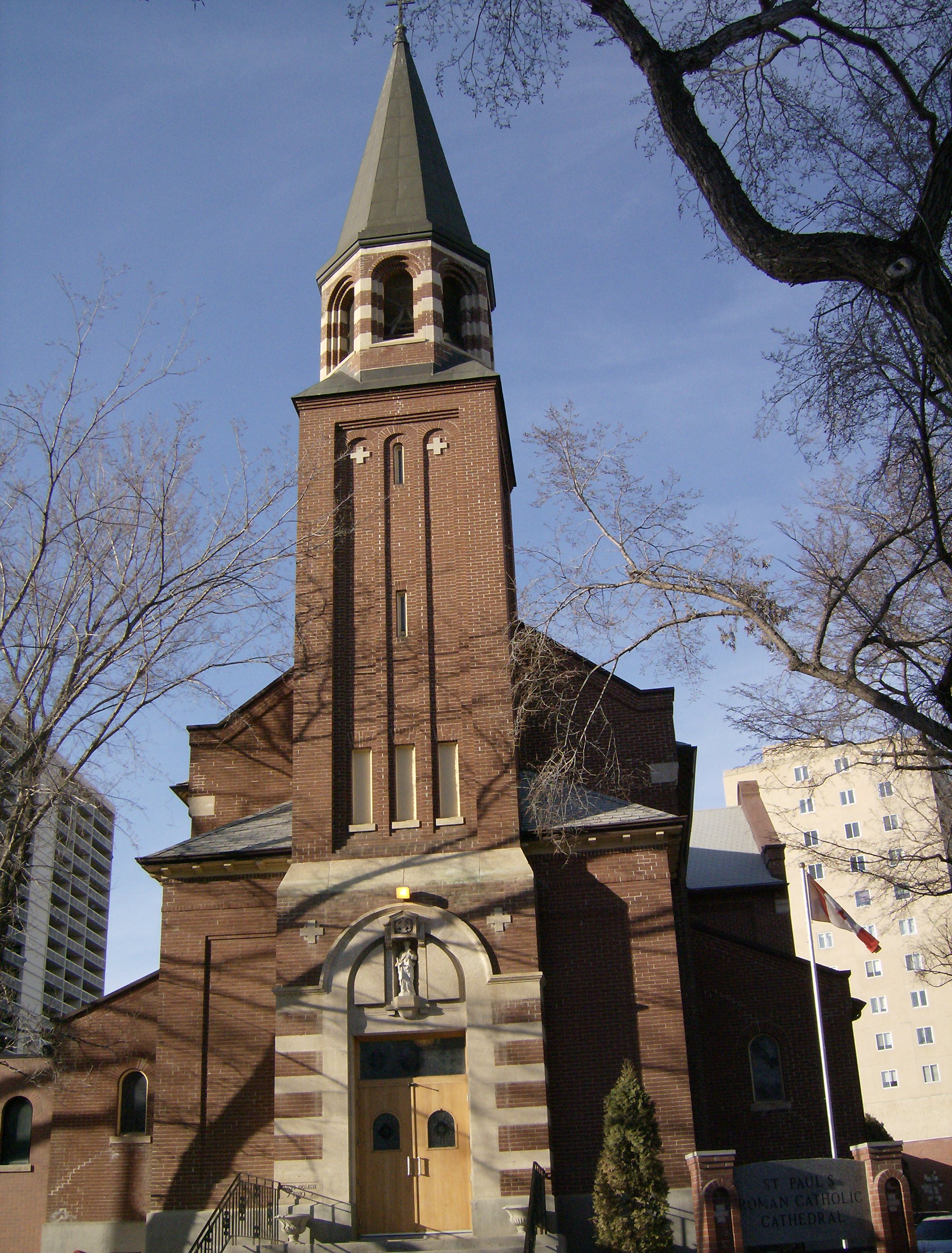

Religion
- Affiliation: Roman Catholic
- Province: Saskatchewan
- Ecclesiastical or organisational status: Co-Cathedral
- Leadership: Bishop Mark Hagemoen D.D, Rector: Very Rev. Fr. Stefano Penna
- Year consecrated: 1911

Location
- Location: (Canada) Saskatoon
- Interactive map of St. Paul's Co-Cathedral

Architecture
- Type: Church
- Style: Romanesque
- Groundbreaking: 1910
- Completed: 1911

Website
- http://www.saskatoonrcdiocese.com/

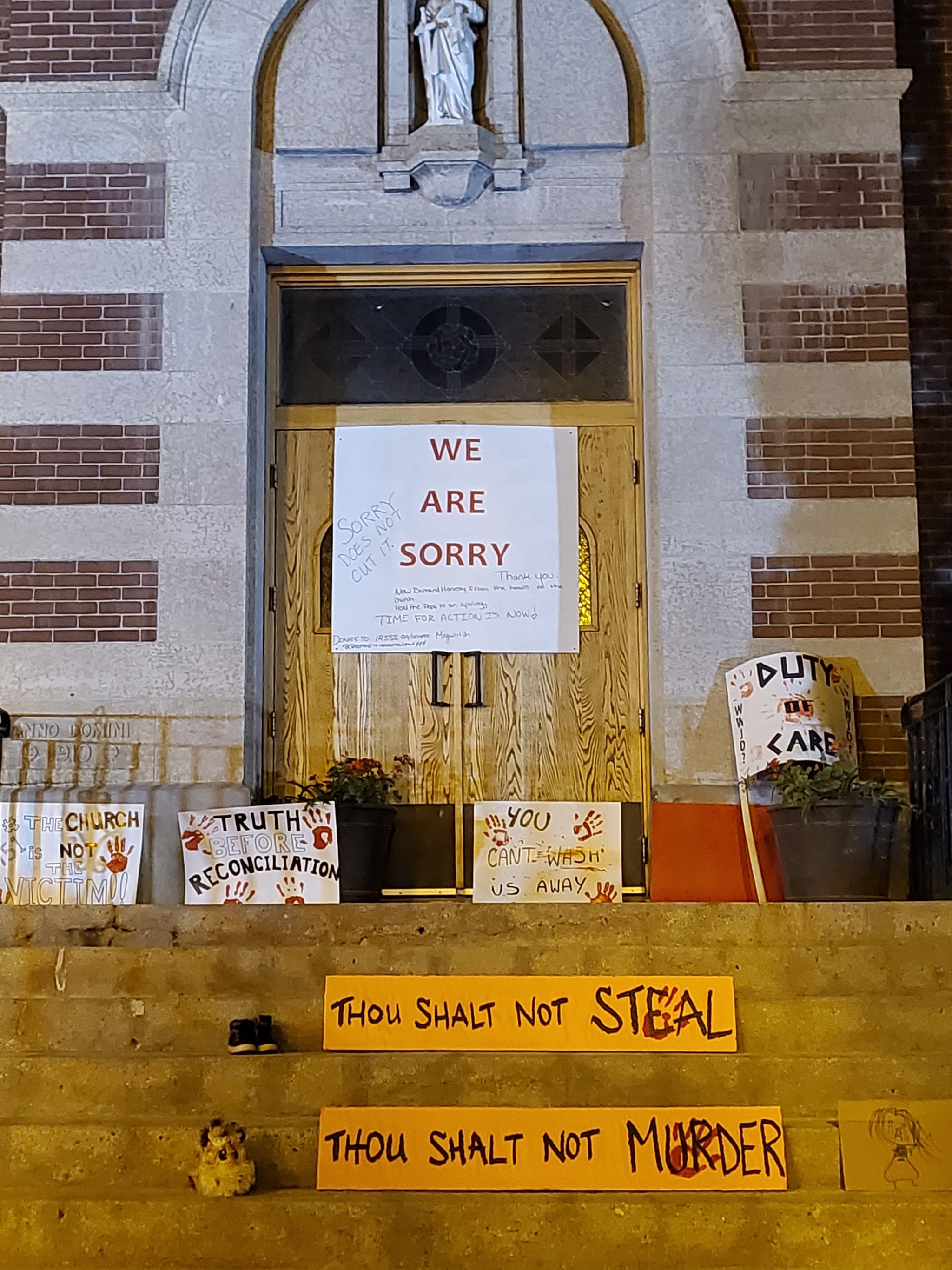
An apology sign is hung on the doors, signs from an earlier protest sit on the front steps.

St. Paul's Co-Cathedral is a parish of the Roman Catholic Church in Saskatoon, Saskatchewan, Canada, and mother church and co-cathedral of the Diocese of Saskatoon. Its small size prevents it from operating as a cathedral. On 24 June 2021 and 2 July 2021 it was vandalized in protest of the discovery of unmarked graves connected to the Merieval Indian Residential School.

== History ==
The Co-Cathedral is located in the city's Central Business District at the corner of 22nd Street East and Spadina Crescent, on the west bank of the South Saskatchewan River. The cornerstone of St. Paul's was laid on July 25, 1910, by Canadian Prime Minister Sir Wilfrid Laurier and a year later it was formally consecrated by Archbishop Adelard Langevin of St. Boniface, Manitoba. Originally built as parish church, it became a pro-cathedral in 1921, and elevated to a full cathedral in 1934 when the Diocese of Saskatoon was established. The Casavant organ was installed in 1912.

The Institute for Stained Glass in Canada has documented the stained glass at St Paul's Cathedral. The stained glass was added in 1945 to commemorate those who lost their lives in World War II and in 1976 for those that lost their lives to a fire.

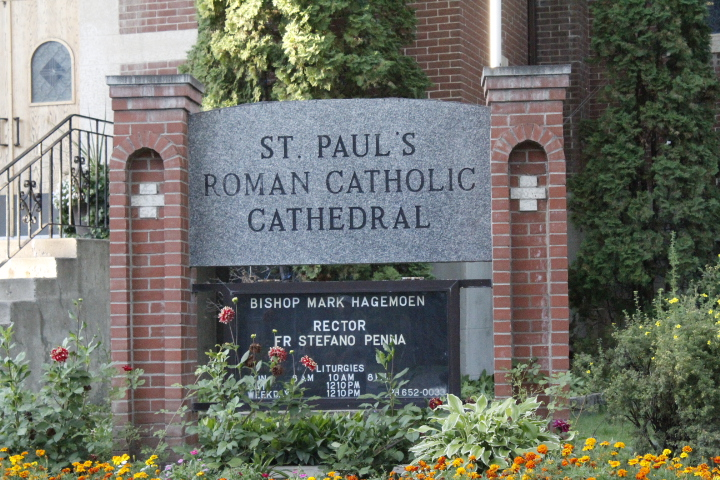

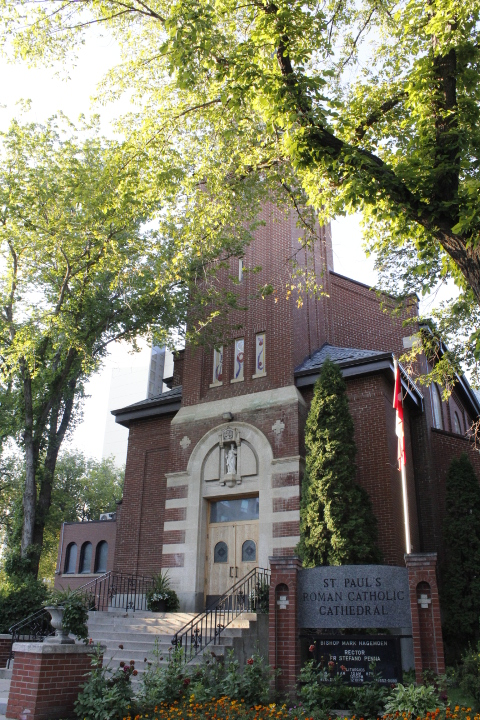

Due to its small size and lack of space to expand, the building had been unable to effectively function as a cathedral since the mid-1990s. On December 18, 2011, the new Holy Family Cathedral was opened, and St. Paul's became a co-cathedral and continued to function as a local parish.

In 2019, two paintings of Sts. Peter and Paul by German religious artist Berthold Imhoff were acquired from the church of St. Andrew's in Blaine Lake, which was being decommissioned. Unveiled on June 29, the feast of Sts. Peter and Paul, they remain on display in the sanctuary.

== Unmarked Graves Protest ==
On June 24, 2021, Cowessess Chief Cadmus Delorme announced the discovery of 751 unmarked graves near the Merieval Indian Residential School which included the graves of first nations children forcefully interned in the Residential School.

That same day, St. Paul's Co-Cathedral was vandalized with the phrase "We were children" accompanied by hand prints, both in red paint. The red paint was later washed off. Police have said that 2 individuals applied the paint to the Co-Cathedral during a demonstration in front of the building.

On July 2, 2021 the Co-Cathedral was vandalized with red hand prints again in response to the discovery of over 1,000 unmarked graves found at Residential Schools.
