= Mark Hagemoen =

Canadian Roman Catholic bishop (born 1961)

The Most Reverend Mark Andrew Hagemoen
- Bishop of Saskatoon
- Church: Roman Catholic Church
- Province: Regina
- See: Saskatoon
- Appointed: September 12, 2017
- Installed: November 23, 2017
- Predecessor: Donald Bolen
- Previous posts: Vicar General of the Archdiocese of Vancouver (2004–2009); Bishop of Mackenzie–Fort Smith (2013–2017)

Orders
- Ordination: May 12, 1990 by Lawrence Sabatini
- Consecration: December 15, 2013 by Gérard Pettipas

Personal details
- Born: September 4, 1961 (age 65) Vancouver, British Columbia, Canada
- Denomination: Roman Catholic
- Residence: Saskatoon
- Education: University of British Columbia (BA); St. Peter's Seminary; Trinity Western University
- Motto: Pax, Servitus, Spex (English: "Peace, Service, Hope")

Styles of Mark Andrew Hagemoen
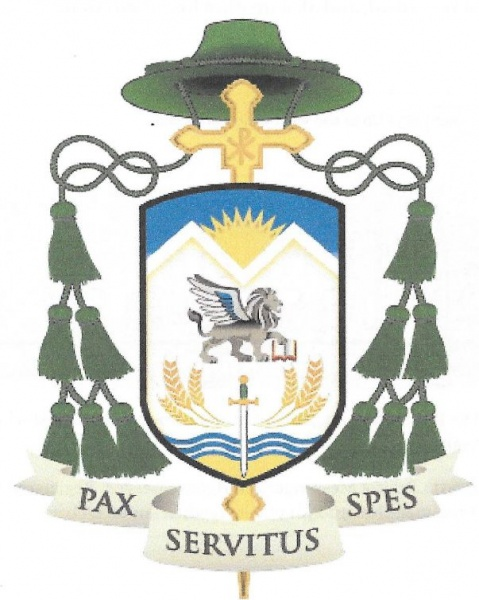
- Reference style: The Most Reverend
- Spoken style: Your Excellency
- Religious style: Your Excellency

Ordination history of Mark Hagemoen
History
Priestly ordination
- Ordained by: Lawrence Sabatini (Kamloops)
Episcopal consecration
- Principal consecrator: Gérard Pettipas (Grouard–McLennan)
- Co-consecrators: J. Michael Miller (Vancouver); Richard William Smith (Edmonton)

Mark Andrew Hagemoen (born September 4, 1961) is a Canadian Roman Catholic bishop.

Ordained to the priesthood on May 12, 1990, Hagemoen was named bishop of the Roman Catholic Diocese of Mackenzie–Fort Smith, Canada on October 15, 2013.

Born and raised in Vancouver, British Columbia, he graduated in 1979 from Vancouver College, a Catholic boys' school. After completing his undergraduate degree (Bachelor of Arts) at the University of British Columbia, and a year of travel throughout Southeast Asia, the Middle East, and Europe, he worked in mineral exploration, mainly in British Columbia. Hagemoen entered St. Peter's Seminary in London, Ont., completing his Masters of Divinity degree. He was ordained in Vancouver by Bishop Lawrence Sabatini in May 1990. He completed the National Certificate in Youth Ministry Studies and the Diploma for Advanced Studies in Ministry in 1997. He earned a Doctor of Ministry program at Trinity Western University, which he completed in 2007.

From 2002 to 2011 he served as Parish Priest at St. John the Apostle Parish in the Kerrisdale neighbourhood of Vancouver.

In 2011, Hagemoen was elected President of Corpus Christi College and Principal of St. Mark's College for a five-year term. Corpus Christi, the liberal arts college, and Saint Mark's College, the graduate theological college affiliated with the University of British Columbia (UBC), are both located on the Vancouver campus of the university. An avid hiker and runner, Hagemoen will be the ninth bishop appointed to the diocese since Vital Grandin was given the post in 1861.

On September 12, 2017, Pope Francis appointed Hagemoen as Bishop of the Saskatoon Diocese. It was later announced that he will be officially installed as Bishop on November 23, 2017.

Hagemon has served on the Board of Directors for Catholic Christian Outreach since 2022.

Catholic Church titles
Preceded by Richard Gagnon	Vicar General of the Archdiocese of Vancouver; 2004–2009	Succeeded by Stephen Jensen
Preceded by Murray Chatlain	Bishop of Mackenzie–Fort Smith; 2013–2017	Succeeded by Jon Hansen
Preceded by Donald Bolen	Bishop of Saskatoon; 2017–present	Incumbent
