= Peter Alfred Sutton =

Peter Alfred Sutton OMI
- Archbishop of Keewatin-Le Pas
- Church: Catholic Church
- Archdiocese: Archdiocese of Keewatin-Le Pas
- In office: November 7, 1986 – March 25, 2006
- Predecessor: Paul Dumouchel
- Successor: Sylvain Lavoie
- Previous posts: Coadjutor Archbishop of Keewatin-Le Pas (1986); Bishop of Labrador-Schefferville (1974-1986)

Orders
- Ordination: October 22, 1960
- Consecration: July 18, 1974 by Gerald Emmett Carter

Personal details
- Born: October 18, 1934 Chandler, Quebec, Dominion of Canada, British Empire
- Died: September 5, 2015 (aged 80)

Peter Alfred Sutton (October 18, 1934 – September 5, 2015) was a Roman Catholic bishop.

Ordained to the priesthood in 1960, Sutton was named bishop of the Diocese of Labrador-Schefferville, Canada, in 1974. In 1986, Sutton was appointed coadjutor archbishop of the Roman Catholic Archdiocese of Keewatin-Le Pas and retired in 2006.
