= Roman Catholic Diocese of Saskatoon =

Catholic ecclesiastical territory

Diocese of Saskatoon Dioecesis Saskatoonensis
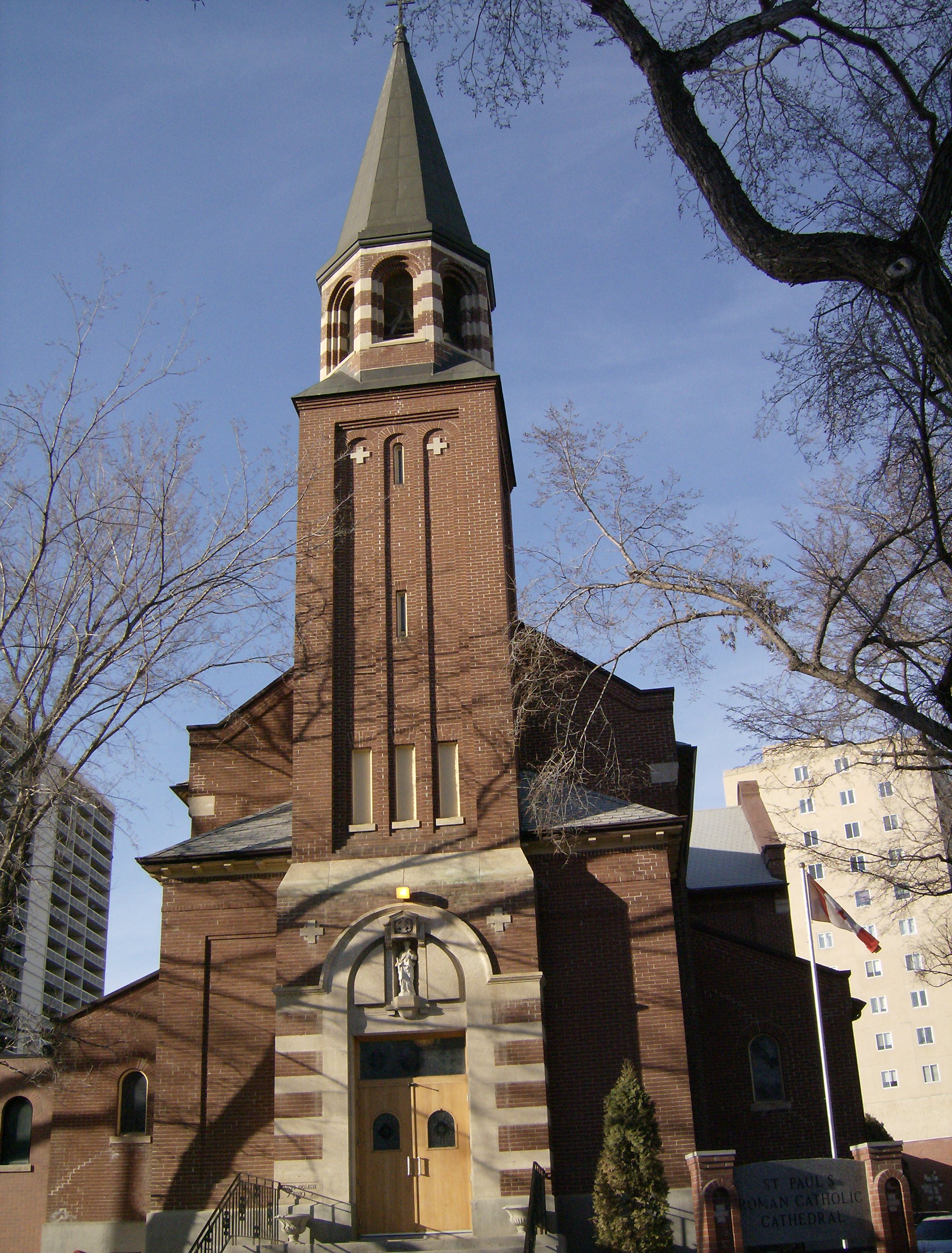
- St. Paul's Co-Cathedral

- Logo of the Diocese

Location
- Country: Canada
- Metropolitan: Regina
- Population: 95,600 (31.0%)

Information
- Denomination: Roman Catholic
- Rite: Roman Rite
- Established: 9 June 1933
- Cathedral: Cathedral of the Holy Family
- Co-cathedral: St. Paul's Co-Cathedral

Current leadership
- Pope: Leo XIV
- Bishop: Mark Hagemoen
- Metropolitan Archbishop: Donald Bolen
- Vicar General: Kevin McGee

Website
- rcdos.ca

The Roman Catholic Diocese of Saskatoon (Latin: Dioecesis Saskatoonensis) (erected 9 June 1933 when the Diocese of Prince-Albert-Saskatoon was split) is a suffragan of the Archdiocese of Regina. The current bishop is Mark Hagemoen, following the appointment of the former diocesan bishop Donald Bolen as Archbishop of Regina by Pope Francis on July 11, 2016. The Roman Catholic Diocese of Saskatoon is located in Saskatchewan, a civil province on the Canadian Prairies.

== Bishops ==
=== Ordinaries ===
- Gerald C. Murray, C.Ss.R. (1934–1944), appointed Coadjutor Archbishop of Winnipeg
- Philip Francis Pocock (1944–1951), appointed Coadjutor Archbishop of Winnipeg
- Francis Joseph Klein (1952–1967) appointed Bishop of Calgary
- James Patrick Mahoney (1967–1995)
- James Vernon Weisgerber (1996–2000), appointed Archbishop of Winnipeg, Manitoba
- Albert LeGatt (2001–2009), appointed Archbishop of Saint-Boniface
- Donald Bolen (2010–2016), appointed Archbishop of Regina (had been Vicar General there)
- Mark Hagemoen (2017–Present)

=== Other priest of this diocese who became bishop ===
- Murray Chatlain, appointed Coadjutor Bishop of Mackenzie-Fort Smith, Northwest Territories in 2007

== Territorial gains ==
In 1998, five Roman Catholic dioceses in Saskatchewan were amalgamated to become three dioceses.

Year	From
1998	suppression of the Diocese of Gravelbourg
1998	suppression of the Territorial Abbey of Saint Peter-Muenster

== Bibliography ==
- "Diocese of Saskatoon". Catholic-Hierarchy.
