= Susai Jesu =

Indian-born Canadian Catholic priest

His Excellency, The Most Reverend Susai Jesu O.M.I.
- Metropolitan Archbishop of Keewatin–Le Pas
- Archdiocese: Keewatin–Le Pas
- Appointed: 17 November 2025
- Predecessor: Murray Chatlain

Orders
- Ordination: 27 July 2000
- Consecration: 26 January 2026 by Murray Chatlain

Personal details
- Born: 17 May 1971 (age 55) Bangalore, Karnataka, India
- Denomination: Roman Catholic
- Education: Pontifical Athenaeum Dharmaram Vidya Kshetram; Saint Paul University
- Motto: Evangelizare Pauperibus Misit Me (He sent Me to Evangelize the Poor)

Susai Jesu OMI (born May 17, 1971) is an Indian-born Canadian Catholic prelate and Missionary Oblate of Mary Immaculate who has served as Archbishop of Keewatin–Le Pas since 2025. He previously served as provincial counsellor for his order and as pastor of Sacred Heart Church of the First Peoples in Edmonton.

== Early life ==
Jesu was born on May 17, 1971, in Pushpavanam, Tamil Nadu, India. He studied philosophy at Pontifical Athenaeum Dharmaram Vidya Kshetram. He acquired a licentiate and doctorate degree in subjects of church history, pastoral counselling, philosophy, and theology at Saint Paul University, Ottawa.

== Priesthood ==
He entered the novitiate of the O.M.I. and was ordained a priest on 27 July 2000 in Madhya Pradesh, India, after he gave his perpetual vows. He has served in several pastoral and administrative roles in his diocese before becoming an archbishop. Since 2017 and 2019, he became provincial counsellor and parish priest of Sacred Heart of the First Peoples in Edmonton.

== Episcopate ==
He was appointed as the metropolitan archbishop of Keewatin–Le Pas, in Manitoba, Canada on 17 November 2025 by Pope Leo XIV. His consecration as the metropolitan archbishop was on 26 January 2026.

Catholic Church titles
Preceded by Murray Chatlain	Metropolitan Archbishop of Keewatin–Le Pas; 2026–Present	Succeeded by Incumbent
