= Holy Family Cathedral (Saskatoon) =

Roman Catholic cathedral in Saskatoon, Saskatchewan, Canada

Cathedral of the Holy Family
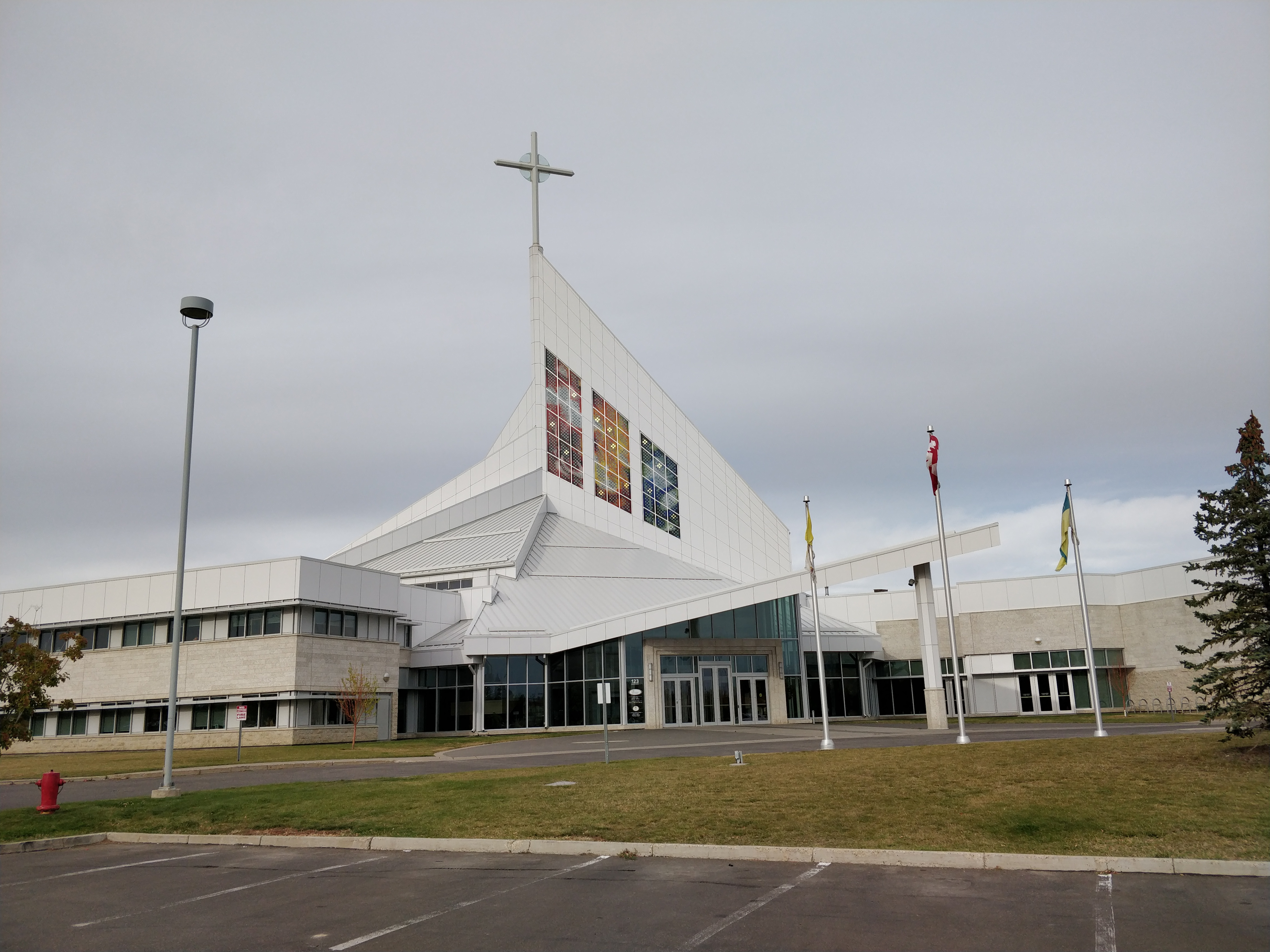
- The cathedral's modernist exterior

Religion
- Affiliation: Roman Catholic
- Province: Saskatchewan
- Year consecrated: 2011

Location
- Location: 123 Nelson Road; Saskatoon, Saskatchewan; S7S 1H1
- Interactive map of Cathedral of the Holy Family
- Coordinates: 52°9′0.48″N 106°35′7.47″W

Architecture
- Architect: Friggstad Downing Henry Architects
- Type: Church
- Groundbreaking: 2010
- Completed: 2011
- Construction cost: CA$28.5 million
- Capacity: 1,250

Website
- http://www.holyfamilycathedral.ca/

The Cathedral of the Holy Family is a Roman Catholic cathedral in the University Heights Suburban Centre neighbourhood of Saskatoon, Saskatchewan, Canada. The Cathedral is located on land adjacent to St. Joseph High School.

St. Paul's Cathedral had reached its physical limits, which necessitated the Roman Catholic Diocese of Saskatoon to build the Cathedral of the Holy Family. Construction on the CA$28.5 million 65,000 sq ft (6,039 m^{2}) cathedral started in 2010, and it opened on December 18, 2011.

The main worship space seats 1,200 with provision to use an overflow area bringing the total to 2,000. The building serves as a parish church, diocesan cathedral, private residence, meeting space, office building, library, archive storage, banquet hall and community centre. The building is designed in an anachronistic modernist style, which is not particularly contemporary, but seems to exemplify a late 1950s-60s attitude towards the future.

Some of the cathedral stained glass windows are equipped with solar panels. This makes the church the first in North America to make use of photovoltaic cells in a stained glass installation. The installation makes use of 1,000 solar cells embedded in 54 panels.
