= Roman Catholic Diocese of Labrador City–Schefferville =

Catholic ecclesiastical territory

The Roman Catholic Diocese of Labrador City–Schefferville (Latin: Dioecesis Labradorpolitana–Scheffervillensis) was a Latin suffragan diocese that included part of the Canadian federal provinces of Newfoundland and Québec.

In 2007, the former cathedral of the diocese in Labrador City, dedicated to Our Lady of Perpetual Help, was decreed as a minor basilica. It is now known as the Basilica of our Lady of Perpetual Help.

== History ==
- Established on 13 July 1945 as Apostolic Vicariate of Labrador, on property split off from Apostolic Vicariate of Golfe Saint-Laurent, Apostolic Vicariate of Hudson Bay and Diocese of Harbour Grace.
- Promoted on 13 July 1967 as Diocese of Labrador–Schefferville / Labradorensis–Schefferpolitana (Latin)
- Renamed on 27 April 1987 as Diocese of Labrador City–Schefferville.
- The diocese was suppressed on 31 May 2007, with its territory being divided among the dioceses of Amos, Baie-Comeau, and the newly renamed Corner Brook and Labrador (formerly St. George's).

== Diocesan ordinaries ==
(all Roman Rite and members of a Latin congregation)

Apostolic Vicar of Labrador

- Lionel Scheffer, Missionary Oblates of Mary Immaculate (O.M.I.) (14 March 1946 – death 3 October 1966), Titular Bishop of Isba (14 March 1946 – 3 October 1966).

Apostolic Vicars of Labrador–Schefferville

- Henri Légaré, O.M.I. (13 July 1967 – 21 November 1972), next metropolitan archbishop of Grouard–McLennan (Canada) (21 November 1972 – retired 16 July 1996), also president of Canadian Conference of Catholic Bishops (1981 – 1983); died 2004
- Peter Alfred Sutton, O.M.I. (9 May 1974 – 24 January 1986), next coadjutor archbishop of Keewatin–Le Pas (Canada) (24 January 1986 – 7 November 1986), succeeding as metropolitan archbishop of Keewatin–Le Pas (7 November 1986 – retired 25 March 2006), died 2015.

Suffragan Bishops of Labrador City–Schefferville

- Henri Goudreault, O.M.I. (27 April 1987 – 16 July 1996), next metropolitan archbishop of Grouard–McLennan (Canada) (16 July 1996 – death 23 July 1998)
- David Douglas Crosby, O.M.I. (24 October 1997 – 31 May 2007), next bishop of Saint George's (Canada) (2003.08.06 – 31 May 2007), bishop of Corner Brook and Labrador (Canada) (31 May 2007 – 24 September 2010), bishop of Hamilton (Canada) (24 September 2010 – present), also vice-president of Canadian Conference of Catholic Bishops (25 September 2013 – 15 September 2015), president of Canadian Conference of Catholic Bishops (15 September 2015 – present).

== Sources and external links ==
- GCatholic with Google photo
- Diocese of Labrador City-Schefferville page at catholichierarchy.org retrieved 18 July 2006
