= Berenice, Cyrenaica =

Ancient city of Cyrenaica

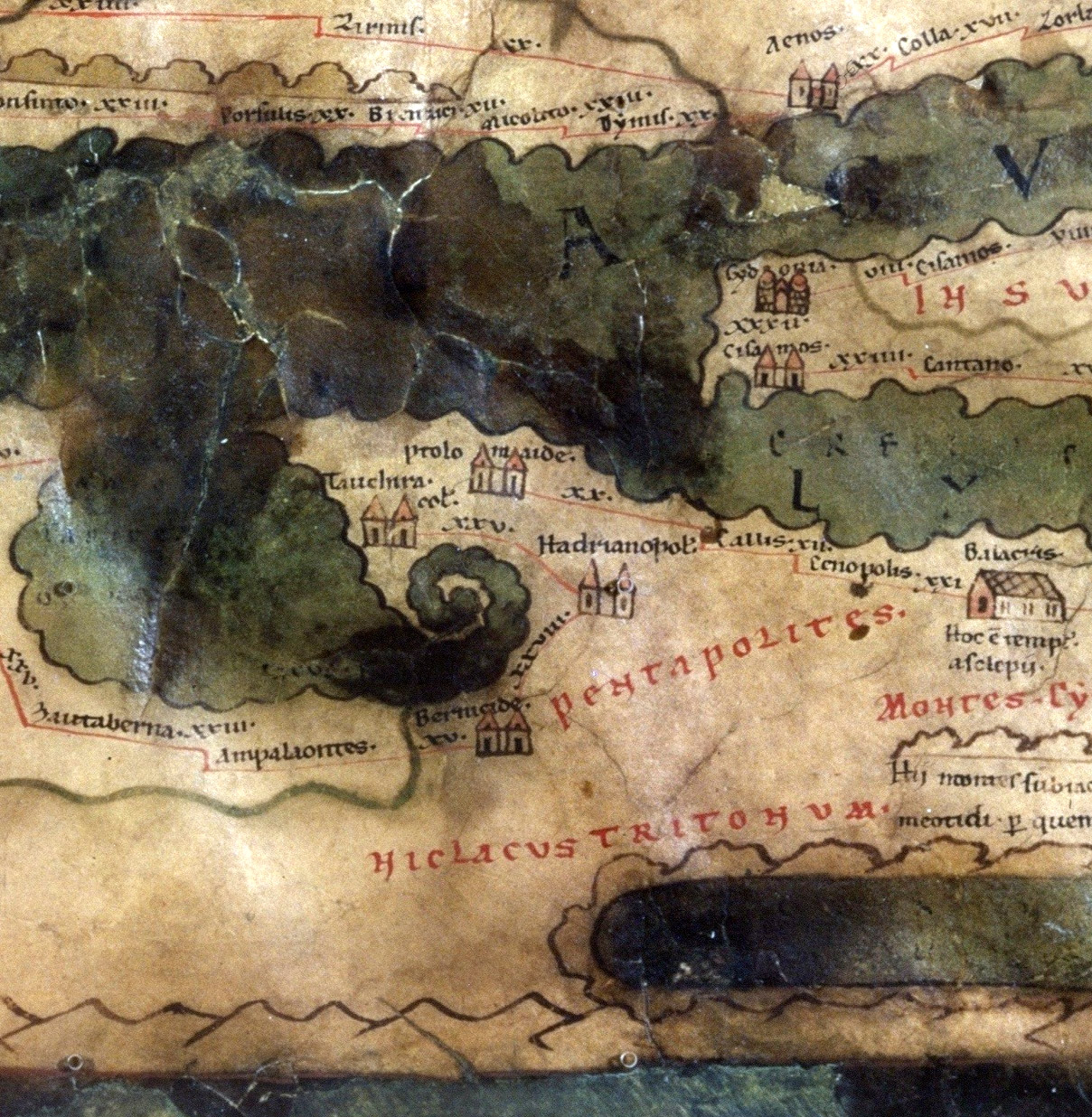
Euesperides was refounded as Berenice and became part of the Roman Pentapolis. This section of the Roman Tabula Peutingeriana itinerarium (road map) shows Berenice and the other cities of the Pentapolis which were bequeathed to Rome.

Berenice (Ancient Greek: Βερενίκη), was an ancient Greek and Roman era city near Benghazi in today's Libya, named after Berenice II of Egypt. The city was located on a raised piece of land in what is now the Eastern Benghazi suburb of Sebkha Es-Selmani (Es-Selmani Marsh).

== History ==
Founded as a Greek Colony, the city became Roman when Cyrenaica became a Roman province by being bequeathed to Rome by Ptolemy Apion on his death in 96 BC. At first, the Romans gave Berenice and the other cities of the Pentapolis their freedom. By 78 BC however, Cyrenaica was formally organised as one administrative province together with Crete. It became a senatorial province in 20 BC, like its far more prominent western neighbour Africa proconsularis. Diocletian in 296, made Cyrenaica into two provinces: Libya Inferior and Libya Superior (which comprised Berenice and the other cities of the Pentapolis, with Cyrene as capital). Berenice prospered for most of its 600 years as a Roman city

Many structures were built in Roman Berenice, and mosaics were to be found on the floors of several important buildings. A public bath, and churches were built in the city later on in its history.

== Religion ==
During Pagan times, the worship of Apollo was very important in Berenice. There was also a Jewish community in Berenice with a synagogue, as attested by an inscription mentioning a list of donors who were involved in its restoration circa 55 AD.

Many of the early Christians were non-trinitarian Sabellians and Carpocrations. After the Council of Nicaea in 325 AD, Cyrenaica had been recognized as an ecclesiastical province of the See of Alexandria. Here it was also the seat of an ancient bishopric of the Roman province of Libya Pentapolitana (Cirenaica). Today Berenice survives as a titular bishopric, but the seat is vacant since October 27, 1968.

By 431 Bernice was conquered by the Arian Vandals. In the 6th century and the city came under the rule of the Orthodox Justinian I.

=== Known bishops ===
- Ammon (fl.260)
- Dachis (fl.325) (Arian)
- Probazio (fl.394)
- Thomas Francis Hickey (18 February 1905 – 18 January 1909 succeeded Catholic bishop of Rochester)
- Ovide Charlebois, (August 8, 1910 – November 20, 1933, deceased)
- Alphonse Joseph Matthijsen (Matthysen), (December 11, 1933 – November 10, 1959 appointed bishop of Bunia)
- Joseph Maria Phâm-Nang-Tinh (March 5, 1960 – November 24, 1960 appointed bishop of Bùi Chu)
- Antonius Hofmann (September 20, 1961 – October 27, 1968 succeeded bishop of Passau)
