= Denis Croteau =

Canadian Roman Catholic prelate (born 1932)

The Most Reverend Denis Croteau O.M.I.
- Bishop Emeritus of Mackenzie–Fort Smith
- Province: Edmonton
- Diocese: Mackenzie–Fort Smith
- Installed: 24 January 1986
- Term ended: 10 May 2008
- Predecessor: Paul Piché
- Successor: Murray Chatlain
- Other post: Apostolic Administrator of Whitehorse (2003–2006)

Orders
- Ordination: 31 August 1958 by Joseph Albertus Martin
- Consecration: 8 June 1986 by Paul Piché, Henri Légaré and Omer Alfred Robidoux

Personal details
- Born: Denis Croteau; 23 October 1932 (age 93) Thetford Mines, Quebec, Canada

Denis Croteau O.M.I. (born 23 October 1932) is a Canadian Roman Catholic prelate who served as the Bishop of the Diocese of Mackenzie–Fort Smith from 1986 to 2008. He also served as the Apostolic Administrator of the Diocese of Whitehorse from 2003 to 2006.

== Early life and priesthood ==
Croteau was born on 23 October 1932 in Thetford Mines, Quebec, Canada. He joined the religious congregation of the Missionary Oblates of Mary Immaculate (OMI) and was ordained a priest on 31 August 1958. Following his ordination, he dedicated much of his ministry to pastoral work in northern Canada, authored spiritual works, and contributed extensively to the Oblate community.

== Episcopal ministry ==
On 24 January 1986, Pope John Paul II appointed Croteau as the Bishop of Mackenzie–Fort Smith, succeeding Paul Piché. He was consecrated to the episcopacy on 8 June 1986 by Bishop Paul Piché, with Bishops Henri Légaré and Omer Alfred Robidoux serving as co-consecrators.

In addition to his duties in Mackenzie–Fort Smith, Croteau was appointed Apostolic Administrator of the vacant Diocese of Whitehorse in 2003, a governance role he maintained until the installation of Bishop Gary Gordon in 2006.

Pope Benedict XVI accepted Croteau's resignation from the pastoral governance of the Diocese of Mackenzie–Fort Smith on 10 May 2008, upon his reaching the age of retirement. He was succeeded by Bishop Murray Chatlain.

Following his retirement, he held the status of Bishop Emeritus within the Canadian Conference of Catholic Bishops.
