= Murray Chatlain =

His Grace, The Most Reverend Murray Chatlain
- Archbishop of Winnipeg
- Church: Roman Catholic Church
- See: Winnipeg
- Appointed: December 30, 2024
- Installed: April 4, 2025
- Predecessor: Richard Gagnon
- Previous posts: Coadjutor Bishop of Mackenzie–Fort Smith (2007–2008); Bishop of Mackenzie–Fort Smith (2008–2012); Archbishop of Keewatin–Le Pas (2012–2024)

Orders
- Ordination: May 15, 1987
- Consecration: September 14, 2007 by Luigi Ventura

Personal details
- Born: Murray Chatlain; 19 January 1963 (age 63) Saskatoon, Saskatchewan, Canada
- Education: University of Saskatchewan; Saint Peter's Seminary
- Motto: Magnificavit Dominus facere nobiscum
- Coat of arms

Styles of Murray Chatlain
- Reference style: His Grace; The Most Reverend (English); Monseigneur (French)
- Spoken style: Your Grace (English); Monseigneur (French)
- Religious style: Archbishop

Murray Chatlain (born January 19, 1963) is a Canadian Catholic prelate who has served as Archbishop of Winnipeg since 2024. He previously served as the Bishop of Mackenzie–Fort Smith and Archbishop of Keewatin–Le Pas.

== Biography ==
Murray Chatlain was born in Saskatoon, Saskatchewan, on January 19, 1963. He completed baccalaureate studies at the University of Saskatchewan and earned the M.Div. degree at St. Peter's Seminary in London, Ontario.

In 1987 Chatlain was ordained a priest for Diocese of Saskatoon; in subsequent years he served parishes in that diocese and within the Diocese of Mackenzie-Fort Smith.

Pope Benedict XVI appointed Chatlain as coadjutor bishop of Mackenzie-Fort Smith in June 2007. Chatlain was consecrated in September of that year, and he succeeded Bishop Denis Croteau, O.M.I. as ordinary upon the latter's retirement in May 2008.

Benedict XVI appointed Chatlain archbishop of Keewatin-Le Pas on December 6, 2012. His installation as the sixth bishop of the Archdiocese took place on March 19, 2013, the same day as the inauguration in Vatican City of the reign of Pope Francis.

Chatlain has studied the Dene aboriginal language and is a member of the Canadian Catholic Aboriginal Council and Co-Chair of Our Lady of Guadalupe Circle, an Indigenous Catholic Coalition.

Chatlain was appointed Archbishop of Winnipeg on December 30, 2024. He was installed on April 4, 2025.

Catholic Church titles
Vacant Title last held by Joseph-Marie Trocellier as Coadjutor Vicar Apostolic	Coadjutor Bishop of Mackenzie–Fort Smith; 2007–2008	Vacant
Preceded by Denis Croteau	Bishop of Mackenzie–Fort Smith; 2008–2012	Succeeded by Mark Hagemoen
Preceded by Sylvain Lavoie	Archbishop of Keewatin–Le Pas; 2012–2024	Succeeded by Soosai Jesu
Preceded by Richard Gagnon	Archbishop of Winnipeg; 2024–present	Incumbent
