= Archdiocese of Winnipeg =

Latin Catholic ecclesiastical territory in Canada

Coordinates: 49.8350°N 97.1508°W

Archdiocese of Winnipeg Archidioecesis Vinnipegensis
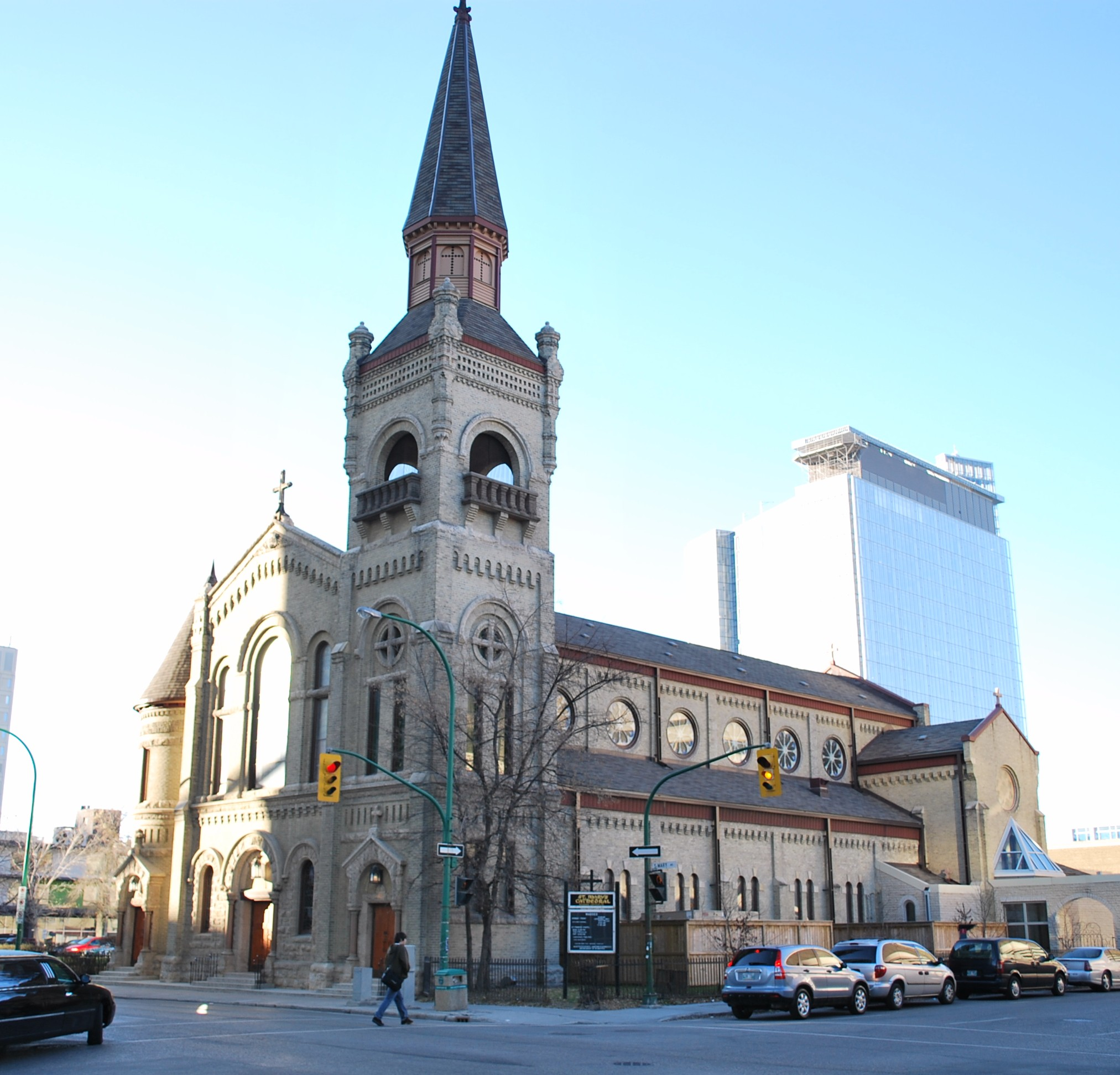
- St. Mary's Cathedral

Location
- Country: Canada
- Ecclesiastical province: Immediately subject to the Holy See
- Deaneries: Central Winnipeg; North Winnipeg; South Winnipeg; Interlake; Westman; Parkland
- Headquarters: 1495 Pembina Highway, Winnipeg, Manitoba, Canada

Statistics
- Population: 162,276
- Parishes: 88
- Schools: 16

Information
- Denomination: Catholic Church
- Sui iuris church: Latin Church
- Rite: Roman Rite
- Established: 1915
- Cathedral: St. Mary's Cathedral in Winnipeg
- Patron saint: St. Joseph
- Secular priests: 58 (diocesan); 13 (members of religious orders)

Current leadership
- Pope: Leo XIV
- Archbishop: Murray Chatlain
- Bishops emeritus: James Vernon Weisgerber; Richard Gagnon

Website
- archwinnipeg.ca

The Archdiocese of Winnipeg (Latin: Archidioecesis Vinnipegensis) is a Latin Church ecclesiastical territory or archdiocese of the Catholic Church that includes part of the province of Manitoba, Canada. The archdiocese is the only diocese of the Latin Church in Canada that is immediately exempt to the Holy See, as it is not part of an ecclesiastical province. Located on the west side of the Red River, the Archdiocese of Winnipeg was created from the Archdiocese of Saint Boniface.

As of 2025, the archdiocese contains 88 parishes and missions, 58 active diocesan priests, 13 religious priests, and 162,276 Catholics. It also has 19 religious brothers and sisters, and 20 permanent deacons. The cathedral of the archdiocese is St. Mary's Cathedral in Winnipeg. The archbishop of Winnipeg is Murray Chatlain. He was installed on April 4, 2025.

== History ==
The Archdiocese was created in 1915 by Pope Benedict XV in his bull Inter praecipuas. Unusually, this bull made the archdiocese exempt and subject immediately to the Holy See. Historian John M. Reid Jr. suggests that this decision was made due to ethnic conflicts in Winnipeg between Irish and French Catholics. The existing Archdiocese of St. Boniface was traditionally Francophone.

== Bishops ==
The following is a list of the bishops and archbishops of Winnipeg and their terms of service:

=== Archbishops ===
- Arthur Alfred Sinnott (1915–1952)
- Philip Francis Pocock (1952–1961), appointed Coadjutor Archbishop of Toronto, Ontario
- George Flahiff (1960–1982)
- Adam Exner (1982–1991), appointed Archbishop of Vancouver, British Columbia
- Leonard James Wall (1992–2000)
- James Weisgerber (2000–2013)
- Richard Gagnon (2014–2024)
- Murray Chatlain (2024–present)

=== Coadjutor bishops ===
- Gerald C. Murray (1944–1951), did not succeed to the see
- Philip Francis Pocock (1951–1952)

=== Auxiliary bishops ===
- Francis Ryder Wood (1940-1943?), did not take effect

=== Priests of this diocese who became bishops ===
- Charles Aimé Halpin, appointed Archbishop of Regina in 1973

== See also ==
- Roman Catholic Archdiocese of Saint Boniface
- Ukrainian Catholic Archeparchy of Winnipeg
