= St. Mary's Cathedral (Winnipeg) =

Catholic cathedral in Manitoba, Canada

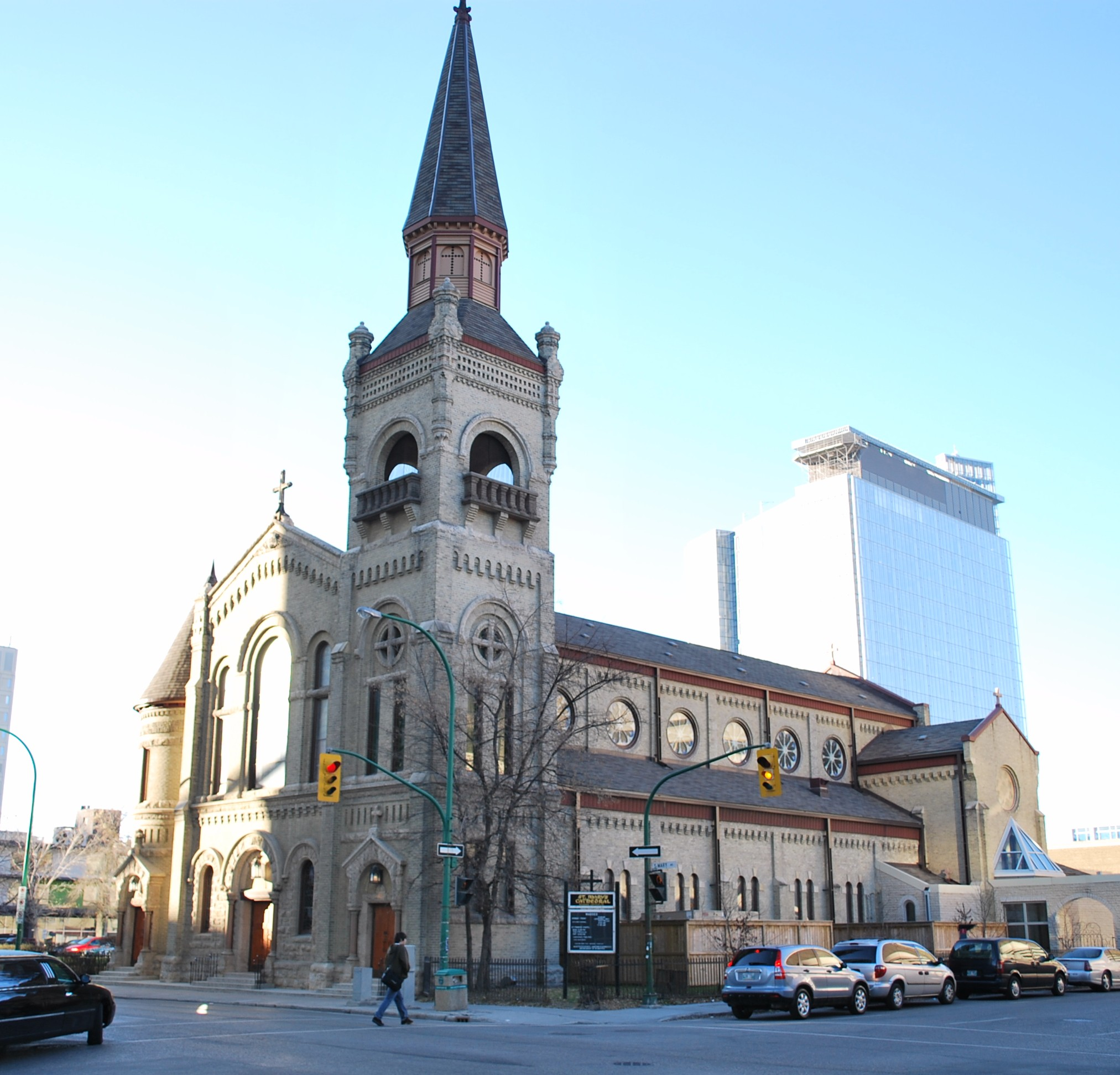
- St. Mary's Roman Catholic Cathedral, Winnipeg, Manitoba.
- St. Mary's Cathedral
- 49.8905°N 97.1436°W
- Location: Winnipeg, Manitoba, Canada
- Address: 353 St. Mary Avenue
- Country: Canada
- Denomination: Catholic Church
- Sui iuris church: Latin Church
- Website: stmaryscathedralwpg.ca

History
- Status: in use
- Dedicated: c. 1888
- Consecrated: September 1887; December 1918 (as cathedral)

Architecture
- Architect: C. Balston Kenway
- Architectural type: Romanesque revival
- Groundbreaking: 1880

Administration
- Archdiocese: Winnipeg
- Deanery: Central Winnipeg

Clergy
- Archbishop: Murray Chatlain
- Rector: Michel J. Nault
- Vicar: James Ahaneku

St. Mary's Cathedral, a Catholic cathedral church located in Winnipeg, Manitoba, Canada. It is the episcopal see of the Archdiocese of Winnipeg. Located at the corner of Saint Mary Avenue and Hargrave Street in downtown Winnipeg, St. Mary's is one of two Catholic cathedrals in the city of Winnipeg; the other, St. Boniface Cathedral, is located across the Red River in the formerly independent city of Saint Boniface.

St. Mary's was originally designed in 1880 by C. Balston Kenway and was updated in 1896 by Samuel Hooper, an English-born stonemason and architect who was later appointed Provincial Architect of Manitoba. The building features elements of Romanesque revival and Germanic architecture.

The Institute for Stained Glass in Canada has documented the stained glass at Minor Basilica Of The National Shrine Of St. Mary's.

As one of the only churches in Winnipeg's downtown, the cathedral is a well known and recognizable municipal historic site.

== History ==
In the later half of the 19th century, the Catholic Church had established itself in Manitoba, with several parishes established. In 1871, the Archdiocese of St. Boniface was established, and Archbishop Taché raised the existing mission to parish status, with the title of "The Most Holy Name of Mary." Plans began to construct a proper building for the new parish, and in 1881 the new building was completed. The first mass in the new building was held on September 4, 1881. The church was consecrated on September 25, 1887.

In 1896, the church was enlarged, with the addition of two towers, with the taller southeast tower measuring 35.1 meters high. This work also included a new facade and expanded side chapels and was designed by architect Samuel Hooper.

At the start of the 20th century, the growing demands of the English-speaking Catholic population within the French archdiocese began to cause tension. In 1906, a petition regarding the demands of the anglophone Catholics was sent to the Vatican. In 1916, after additional petitions, Pope Benedict XV established the Archdiocese of Winnipeg, with Msgr. Alfred Arthur Sinnott being named Archbishop. Sinnott selected The Most Holy Name of Mary Parish as the new Archdiocese's cathedral, with it being consecrated in 1918 as St. Mary's.

In the 1950s, and 1960s several additions were made to the cathedral. In the 1950s, stained glass windows were added to the cathedral. In 1965, a new rectory was constructed, which included a parish hall and three floors of office space and housing.

In 1972, the City of Winnipeg expanded to include surrounding urban areas in a process known as Unicity. This included Saint Boniface, which made Winnipeg the only city in North America to have two Roman Catholic Cathedrals.

In 1984, the cathedral hosted visiting Pope John Paul II during his apostolic visit to Canada.

In 2017, the cathedral was designated a municipal historic site.

== See also ==
- Archdiocese of Winnipeg
- Archdiocese of St. Boniface
- St. Boniface Cathedral
- List of historic places in Winnipeg
- Holy Trinity Anglican Church
- Westminster United Church
