= Gerald C. Murray =

Canadian Roman Catholic clergyman and prelate

Gerald C. Murray C.Ss.R.
- Bishop of Saskatoon
- Church: Catholic Church
- Diocese: Diocese of Saskatoon
- In office: 21 December 1933 – 22 January 1944
- Predecessor: Diocese erected
- Successor: Philip Pocock
- Other posts: Coadjutor Archbishop of Winnipeg (1944-1951); Titular Archbishop of Bizya (1944-1951)
- Previous posts: Bishop of Victoria (1930-1933)

Orders
- Ordination: 4 September 1910
- Consecration: 7 May 1930 by Andrea Cassulo

Personal details
- Born: 26 December 1885 Montreal, Quebec, Dominion of Canada, British Empire
- Died: 3 June 1951 (aged 65)

Gerald C. Murray (born 26 December 1885 in Montreal; died 3 June 1951) was a Canadian clergyman and prelate for the Roman Catholic Diocese of Saskatoon, as well as Victoria and Winnipeg. He was appointed bishop in 1933. He died in 1951.
