= James McGuigan =

Canadian prelate

His Eminence James Charles McGuigan
- Cardinal, Archbishop Emeritus of Toronto
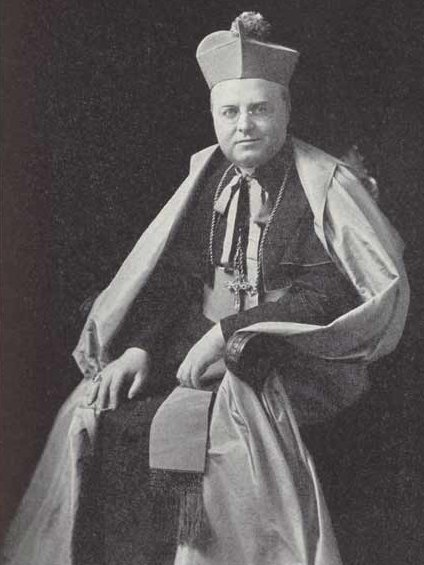
- Church: Catholic Church
- Archdiocese: Archdiocese of Toronto
- Appointed: December 22, 1934
- Retired: March 30, 1971
- Predecessor: Neil McNeil
- Successor: Philip Pocock
- Other post: Archbishop of Regina (1930-1934)

Orders
- Ordination: May 26, 1918 by Henry Joseph O'Leary
- Consecration: May 15, 1930 by Henry Joseph O'Leary
- Created cardinal: February 18, 1946 by Pope Pius XII
- Rank: Cardinal-Priest

Personal details
- Born: November 26, 1894 Hunter River, Prince Edward Island, Canada
- Died: April 8, 1974 (aged 79) Toronto, Ontario, Canada
- Coat of arms

James Charles McGuigan (November 26, 1894 – April 8, 1974) was a Canadian prelate of the Catholic Church. He was the longest-serving Archbishop of Toronto, serving for almost 37 years from 1934 to 1971. He became the first English-speaking cardinal from Canada in 1946.

== Early life ==
James Charles McGuigan was born on November 26, 1894, in Hunter River, Prince Edward Island, the third of eight children of George Hugh McGuigan and Annie Monaghan. When McGuigan was five years old, he allegedly told his mother, "When I get big I shall preach big." He received his early education at the local public school in Hunter River, where his uncle was the schoolmaster.

McGuigan attended Prince of Wales College in Charlottetown from 1908 to 1911, winning the Governor General's Academic Medal in his final year. While studying there he supported himself by taking teaching posts at Covehead, Tenmile House, and Stanley Bridge. He studied at Saint Dunstan's University for two years and received a bachelor's degree in 1914. He prepared for the priesthood at the Grand Seminary of Quebec, earning a doctorate in theology in 1918.

== Priesthood ==
McGuigan was ordained a priest on May 26, 1918, by Bishop Henry Joseph O'Leary, at his childhood parish of St. Augustine's Church in South Rustico. He was then appointed to the faculty of Saint Dunstan's University, serving as a professor of mathematics, chemistry and physics. However, the 1918 influenza pandemic forced the school to temporarily close in October 1918 and McGuigan himself fell ill, eventually recovering but losing much of his hearing.

In 1919, McGuigan became secretary to Bishop O'Leary, who had ordained him. He retained this position when O'Leary was promoted to Archbishop of Edmonton the following year. He was later named chancellor (1922) and vicar general (1923) of the Archdiocese of Edmonton.

When St. Joseph's Cathedral was opened in 1925, McGuigan was appointed rector in additions to his duties as vicar general. In the first half of 1927, he took doctoral courses in canon law at the Catholic University of America in Washington, D.C., but did not complete a degree. When he returned to Edmonton that year, he was made rector of the new St. Joseph Seminary and named a protonotary apostolic on the following September 13.

== Archbishop of Regina ==
On January 30, 1930, McGuigan was appointed the second Archbishop of Regina by Pope Pius XI. He received his episcopal consecration on the following May 15 from Archbishop O'Leary, with Archbishop Arthur Béliveau and Bishop John Kidd serving as co-consecrators, at St. Joseph's Cathedral in Edmonton. At age 35, he was the youngest Catholic archbishop in the world.

At Regina, McGuigan was confronted with a bleak situation: James Anderson had been elected Premier of Saskatchewan the previous year with the support of the anti-Catholic Ku Klux Klan; the Great Depression had left two-thirds of the Saskatchewan population on welfare; and McGuigan's predecessor as Archbishop, the late Olivier Elzéar Mathieu, had left the Archdiocese with $1.2 million in debt. This led him to suffer a nervous breakdown in September 1930, from which he recovered in February 1931.

To reduce the Archdiocese's debt, McGuigan sold his official residence to the Franciscans, who later turned the building into a seminary in 1932. Through this, and also soliciting funds from wealthier Canadian dioceses, he was able to stabilize the debt. During his four years in Regina, McGuigan also held the first Eucharistic congress in western Canada, organized religious vacation schools, and established the Catholic Federated Charities.

== Archbishop of Toronto ==
Following the death of Archbishop Neil McNeil, McGuigan was appointed Archbishop of Toronto on December 22, 1934. He took formal charge of the Archdiocese on March 20, 1935, when he was installed at St. Michael's Cathedral.

McGuigan faced a similar, if not worse, situation in Toronto as he did in Regina: the Archdiocese was $4 million in debt. In 1935, he was helped by a gift of $500,000 from Frank Patrick O'Connor, a Catholic businessman and member of the Senate of Canada. By his eighth year in office, he managed to cut the debt in half.

At the outbreak of World War II in 1939, McGuigan condemned "the insatiable desire for power, for domination and ambitious display" and vowed that "Canada will take her place calmly and steadfastly side by side with Great Britain." During the war, he released priests to serve as military chaplains and formed 90 women's societies to send parcels overseas.

Due in part to the post-war boom, the Catholic population of the Archdiocese soared from 135,000 to 650,000 during McGuigan's tenure. He supported foreign aid to Europe in order to stop the spread of communism, and he condemned the arrest and trial of Cardinal József Mindszenty in Hungary. He was given the honorary title of assistant to the papal throne by Pope Pius XII on August 20, 1943.

=== Cardinal ===
McGuigan was created Cardinal-Priest of Santa Maria del Popolo by Pius XII in the consistory of February 18, 1946. He thus became the first English-speaking cardinal from Canada, describing his elevation as "the greatest surprise of my life." Between the death of Cardinal Jean-Marie-Rodrigue Villeneuve of Quebec in 1947 and the elevation of Cardinal Paul-Émile Léger of Montreal in 1953, he was the only cardinal in Canada. He participated in the 1958 papal conclave that elected Pope John XXIII.

Feeling the toll of his heavy workload, McGuigan requested a coadjutor bishop to take charge of diocesan affairs and eventually succeed him, and he received Archbishop Philip Pocock from Winnipeg in 1961. He disagreed with the more liberal views of Pocock and his advisor Gregory Baum, especially on the issue of birth control. McGuigan attended the Second Vatican Council from 1962 to 1965, and opposed some of the council's reforms, which he believed would make the Catholic Church "Protestant within 50 years." Amid the council's sessions, he participated in the 1963 papal conclave that elected Pope Paul VI.

McGuigan officially retired as Archbishop of Toronto on March 30, 1971, after almost 37 years in office. He died from a heart attack on April 8, 1974, at age 79. He is buried in Regina Cleri Cemetery at St. Augustine's Seminary.

Catholic Church titles
Preceded by Olivier Elzéar Mathieu	Archbishop of Regina; 1930–1934	Succeeded by Peter Joseph Monahan
Preceded by Neil McNeil	Archbishop of Toronto; 1934–1971	Succeeded by Philip Francis Pocock
