= Missionary Oblates of Mary Immaculate in Canada =

Catholic missionary group

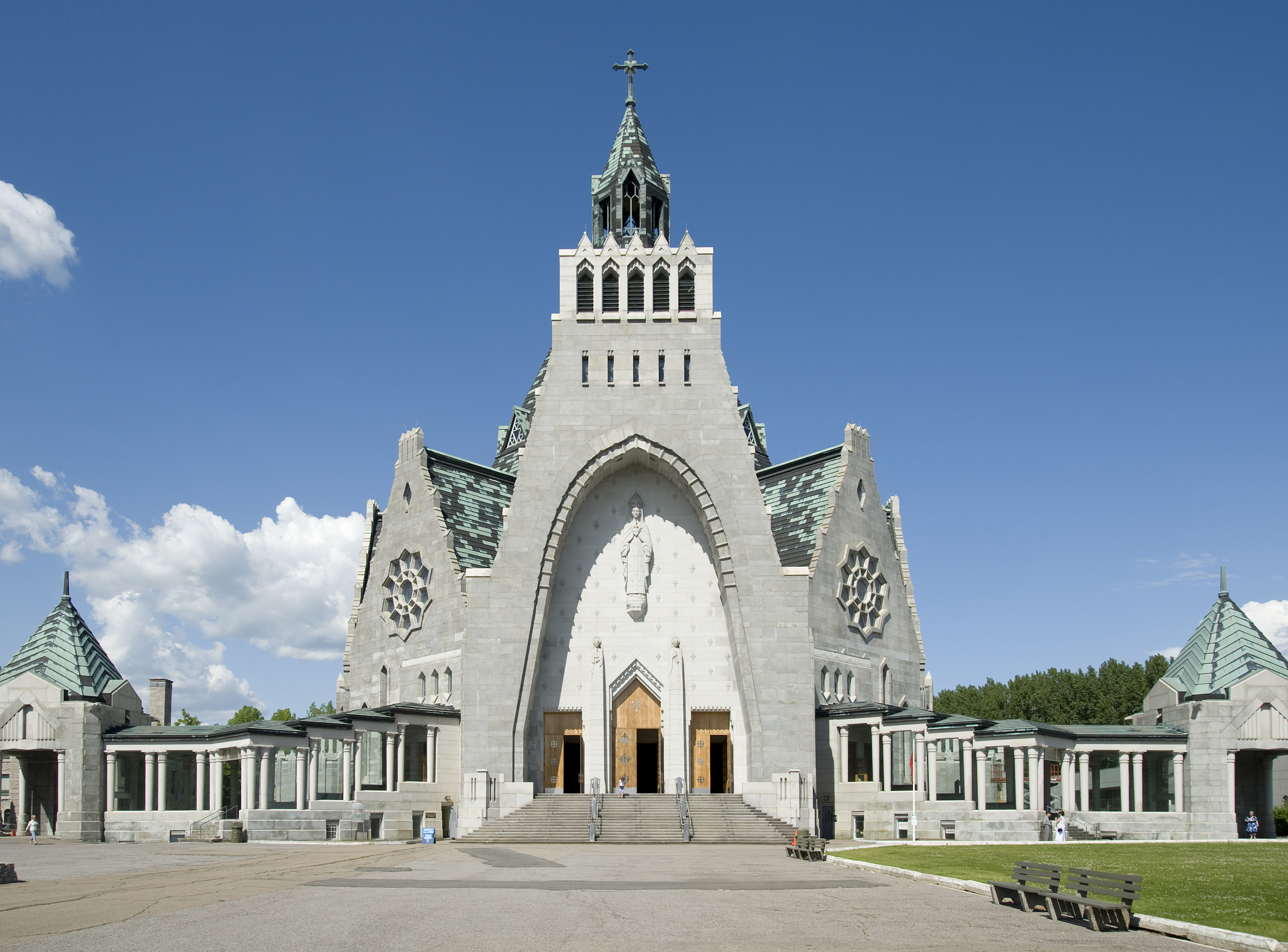
Notre-Dame-du-Cap Basilica, a Canadian shrine administered by the Oblates

The Missionary Oblates of Mary Immaculate (OMI) is a missionary religious congregation in the Catholic Church. As part of their mission to evangelize the "abandoned poor", the Oblates are known for their mission among the Indigenous peoples of Canada, and their historic administration of at least 57 schools within the Canadian Indian residential school system. Some of those schools have been associated with cases of child abuse by Oblate clergy and staff.

The OMI founded the University of Ottawa in 1848, then the College of Bytown. Since the University of Ottawa became publicly funded in 1965, Saint Paul University exists as a separate but federated institution with a pontifical charter to grant ecclesiastical degrees and a public charter, through the University of Ottawa, to grant civil degrees. The congregation has been involved in religious and secular publishing, helping to establish a number of church, community, and ethnic newspapers in Canada including Ottawa's francophone daily newspaper Le Droit.

OMI's Canadian presence is currently administered in three geographic provinces:

- Notre-Dame-du-Cap (French), housed at Notre-Dame-du-Cap Basilica in Trois-Rivières, Quebec
- Lacombe (English), with offices in Saskatoon, Saskatchewan, and Dominican University College in Ottawa, Ontario
- Assumption (Polish), based in Toronto, Ontario.

As of July 2019, there were 282 Oblate priests working in Canada.

== History ==
In 1841, at the request of Bishop Ignace Bourget, OMI sent its first missionaries to Canada. Arriving first at St-Hilaire in Montérégie, the Oblates then settled in Montreal and Bytown (Ottawa). The Oblates began in parish missions and later, moved to parishes in poor areas. The Oblates expanded to Abitibi-Témiscamingue, Moose Factory, and Fort Albany in James Bay. In 1845, at the request of the Bishop of Saint Boniface, Norbert Provencher, the Oblates went to Red River Colony, Manitoba. This was the beginning of their missions of Western and Northern Canada.

Arriving at the Métis Red River Colony in a birch bark canoe in 1845, Oblate Alexandre-Antonin Taché (1823–1894) was ordained by Bishop Provencher. Taché was elevated to Bishop of Saint Boniface in 1854, a year after Provencher's death. In 1857, Taché selected 13-year-old Louis Riel as a candidate for the priesthood and sent him to study at College de Montreal. After Riel returned in 1857, he became increasingly involved in Métis leadership and led the Red River Rebellion. Taché acted as intermediary between Riel's provisional government and Canadian Prime Minister John A. Macdonald's Cabinet and then worked to establish the terms of the Manitoba Act of 1870, which would join the colony to Canada. After the failure of rebellion, Taché unsuccessfully advocated for Riel's amnesty.

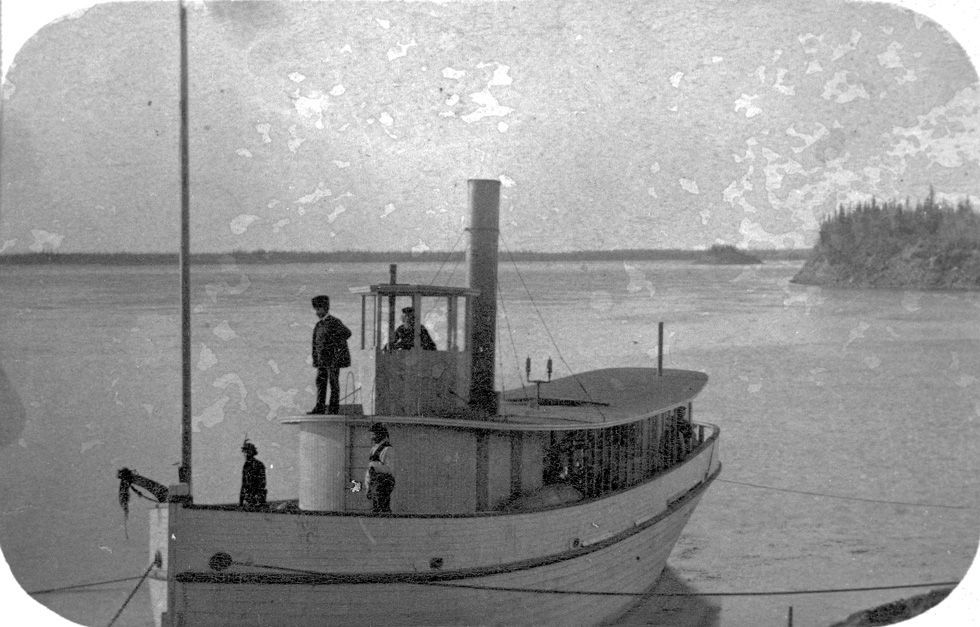
The steamboat St. Alphonse

To facilitate their mission, after his installation as Titular bishop of Ibora in 1890, and ordination as Bishop of Athabaska in 1891, Émile Grouard instructed Oblates to construct of a fleet of steamboats. The Western Canadian steamships of the Oblate Order of Mary Immaculate consisted of at least four boats, including St. Alphonse (built in 1894) and St. Charles (built in 1903). The boats also carried supplies for the North-West Mounted Police and Hudson's Bay Company.

=== Treaty 11 ===
In order to receive funding from the Canadian Government for the OMI mission to the Dene people, the area they served needed to be under treaty. From 1909 to 1921, Oblate Gabriel-Joseph-Elie Breynat, Vicar Apostolic of Mackenzie and titular Bishop, lobbied and negotiated so that the Dene would have such a treaty but reception from the Canadian government was lukewarm. This changed in 1921 when, driven primarily by desire for rights to newly discovered oil, Duncan Campbell Scott, Superintendent of Indian Affairs approached Breynat for his support to "insure the success" of treaty negotiations with the Dene. Known for being part of the negotiations for Treaty 8, Breynat accompanied treaty commissioner, Henry Anthony Conroy, through the negotiations, and witnessed Treaty 11, signing at eight out of nine commission visits across the territory. Conroy noted, "I was very glad to be accompanied by His Lordship Bishop Breynat, O.M.I., who has considerable influence with the Indians in the North, and would like here to express my appreciation of the help and hospitality accorded to me and my party in his missions..." Meanwhile, Breynat noted, "I may say that I am responsible for the treaty having been signed at several places, especially at Fort Simpson." The last of the Numbered Treaties, Treaty 11 bound the Slavey, Tłı̨chǫ (Dogrib), Gwichʼin, Sahtu (Hare), and other peoples in the vast 950,000 km^{2} (370,000 sq mi) area, which would become part of the Northwest Territories and Yukon under the Government of Canada's jurisdiction.

=== Order of Canada protest ===
In December 2008, representatives of Assumption OMI returned two Order of Canada medals to the office of the Governor General of Canada in protest over the honour being bestowed to Henry Morgentaler, noted Canadian abortion rights advocate. While the medals themselves were returned, the honours, given in 1979 to Oblate Michael J. Smith (1911–2002) for "his success in integrating war refugees into new surroundings and of his deep concern for the Polish community at large" and in 1971 to Oblate Anthony Sylla, for his "dedicated services for over sixty years as an Oblate missionary to immigrant settlers in Western Canada", are still valid.

== Residential school administration (1884–1990) ==
In 1876, Canada established the Indian Act. To fulfill various treaty obligations to provide education to Indigenous peoples, the Act provided for Indigenous education at day schools built on reserves.

Oblate Vital-Justin Grandin, Bishop of St. Albert advocated for Indigenous children to "become civilized" through residential schools. In 1880, he wrote to Public Works Minister Hector-Louis Langevin, explaining that boarding schools were best to make Indigenous children "forget the customs, habits & language of their ancestors".

In 1884, the Indian Act was amended to allow the Governor in Council to "make regulations [committing] children of Indian blood under the age of sixteen years, to such industrial school or boarding school, there to be kept, cared for and educated [until age] eighteen". The Act was further amended via The Indian Advancement Act, 1884, establishing that the denomination of teachers at reserve schools was determined by the dominant religion already present, but with provision for minority denominations to have a separate school with permission of the Governor in Council. This allowed for churches to establish schools, not based on existing denominational presence, but to fulfil missionary work.

A primary operator of Canadian Indian residential schools, the OMI maintained at least 57 (41%) of 139 total schools funded by the Government of Canada, including Atlantic Canada's only residential school, the Shubenacadie Indian Residential School.

In 1887, missionary physician, Nicolas Coccola, arrived at the site of the Mission jésuite Saint-Eugène auprès des indiens Kootenai Jesuit mission to the Kootenay of British Columbia and established a residential school (1890) and silver mine (1895).

In 1920, the Indian Act was again amended, making it mandatory for all Indigenous children between age seven and sixteen to attend an Indian Residential School. In 1933, principals of residential schools were conferred legal guardianship of the children attending the school via the Act.

=== "Flying school buses" ===
On November 27, 1930, Breynat was a Commercial Airways passenger with the Mother Provincial of the Sisters of Charity (The Grey Nuns) traveling from Fort McMurray to Fort Chipewyan. On landing, the plane struck gasoline cans on the runway and collided into a group of children. Four were killed, five injured, and the RCMP gave aid. In 1937, Breynat purchased a Waco biplane (CF-BDY) to be flown by Louis Bisson CM, OBE.

In 1938, "The Flying Priest", Oblate Paul Schulte (1896–1975) conducted a medical evacuation from Arctic Bay, transporting Oblate Julien Cochard to Chesterfield Inlet in a Stinson Reliant floatplane.

Jean-Antoine Trocellier, Vicar Apostolic of Mackenzie purchased a Noorduyn Norseman bush plane (CF-GTM) in February 1952 and based it in Fort Smith. In 1954, the OMI began taking children to schools from their communities by the "Arctic Wings" airplane, which resulted in a reduction in police escort records from that period. Oblate William A. Leising shuttled the children to residential schools, calling his plane the "flying school bus", picking them up from their communities and landing at Chesterfield Inlet, Nunavut, Aklavik, Northwest Territories, and Churchill, Manitoba.

The Norseman aircraft operated until 1957 when it was sold and replaced by a de Havilland Canada DHC-2 Beaver (CF-OMI).

=== Revelations, reconciliation, and the contemporary ministry since 1991 ===
On March 15, 1991, after its National Meeting on Indian Residential Schools, the Catholic Church recognized that the "negative experiences in the Residential Schools cannot be considered in isolation from the root causes of the indignities and injustices suffered by aboriginal peoples." This was followed by a statement from Oblate Conference of Canada President Douglas Crosby, on July 24, 1991, stating an apology on "certain aspects" of its ministry. Noting that the Oblate was soon to celebrate its 150th anniversary of ministering to Native peoples of Canada, Crosby wrote that the OMI recognized that they were a "key player" in the "implementation of cultural, ethnic, linguistic, and religious imperialism" that "threatened the cultural, linguistic, and religious traditions of native peoples". Crosby also noted that sexual and physical abuse had occurred at the residential schools, and that the instances were "inexcusable, intolerable, and a betrayal of trust." Further, Crosby noted that the OMI renewed its commitment to work with Native peoples in a renewed relationship seeking to "move past mistakes to a new level of respect and mutuality."

In 1991, Oblate Hubert O'Connor (1928–2007), Bishop of Prince George was charged with sex crimes and resigned his see. Initially convicted in 1996 of rape and indecent assault on two Indigenous women, O'Connor was sentenced to two-and-a-half years in prison. By affidavit, O'Connor admitted only to consensual relationships with the women, and that he had fathered a child that was placed for adoption. On appeal of the conviction, O'Connor's charges were dismissed. He resigned as bishop in 1991, but retained the honorific of most reverend.

=== St. Anne's Indian Residential School ===
St. Anne's Indian Residential School was run by the OMI and the Grey Nuns of the Cross through Canadian Government funding from 1902 to 1976. Investigations into allegations of abuse at St. Anne's Residential School began in November 1992. Over seven years, Ontario Provincial Police interviewed approximately 700 survivors and witnesses, collecting approximately 900 statements about abuses at the school from 1941 to 1972. Physical abuse came in many different forms including poor living conditions and corporal punishments for students speaking in their native languages.

=== Kamloops Indian Residential School ===
Starting in 1893 (three years after its inception) until 1977, the Canadian government charged the Oblates of Mary Immaculate with running the Kamloops Indian Residential School in British Columbia on the traditional territory of the Secwépemcúl'ecw (Secwepemc). In 1910, the principal said that the government did not provide enough money to properly feed the students. Hundreds of Secwépemcúl'ecw children attended the school, many forcibly removed from their homes following the promulgation of mandatory attendance laws in the 1920s. Peaking at 500 students the 1950s, it became Canada's largest residential school. As a matter of policy, the administration forbade children who attended the school from speaking their native Secwepemctsin language or practicing their traditional spirituality.

The indigenous community had long suspected that unmarked graves were located at the residential school, but no proof existed to support this. In 2021, anthropologist Dr. Sarah Beaulieu surveyed the area with ground-penetrating radar and observed "disruptions in the ground" which she concluded could be 200 unmarked graves, based on "their placement, size, depth, and other features". In July 2021, Beaulieu noted that they should be considered "probable burials" or "targets of interest" because only with an excavation could they be confirmed as human remains.

In a statement released by the First Nations Health Authority, CEO Richard Jock said, "That this situation exists is sadly not a surprise and illustrates the damaging and lasting impacts that the residential school system continues to have on First Nations people, their families and communities."

Rosanne Casimir of Tk'emlúps te Secwépemc (TteS) said that work was underway to determine whether the Royal British Columbia Museum held relevant records. Plans had been formed for an archeological dig although the idea remained controversial among school survivors, "with some seeing exhumation as a process that could help lay victims properly to rest, while others want them left undisturbed." As of May 2022, debates were ongoing. The RCMP "E" Division stated at the time that while it had opened an investigation "so that we can assist should our assistance be required", it was "respect[ing] that Tk'emlúps te Secwépemc remains as the lead official at this time", and was not looking into the site itself. As of May 2022, no remains had been excavated, leaving the initial claim unverified.

Premier of British Columbia John Horgan said he was "horrified and heartbroken" at the discovery, and that he supported further efforts to bring to "light the full extent of this loss." Highlighting the national importance of the discovery, flags were lowered in communities across Canada. In Halifax, Mayor Mike Savage noted the flag lowering was "to honour the children found in Kamloops and all others who lost their lives to the residential schools system."

On May 30, 2021, Ken Thorson of Lacombe OMI issued a media release acknowledging discovery of the children's remains:

On behalf of the Missionary Oblates of Mary Immaculate, I wish to express my heartfelt sadness and sincere regret for the deep pain and distress the discovery of the remains of children buried on the grounds of Kamloops Indian Residential School brings to the Tk'emlúps te Secwépemc First Nation, and other affected Indigenous communities, especially family members of the deceased. I appreciate the sensitive and respectful way in which this difficult work is being carried out. This heart-breaking discovery brings the tragedy of the residential school system into the light once again and demands that we continue to confront its legacy.

The Missionary Oblates were administrators and teachers at the Kamloops Indian Residential School. Through our own ongoing reflection, and the work of the Truth and Reconciliation Commission, we are growing into a deepening awareness of the damage caused to Indigenous peoples, the enduring harm caused by colonization and the part our religious order played in it through the residential school system.

This growing awareness leads us to an increased desire to listen deeply and learn from Indigenous communities where Oblates continue to live and minister. The Oblates remain committed to humbly participating in ongoing efforts towards reconciliation and healing for our role in this painful part of our shared history.

— Father Ken Thorson, Provincial, OMI Lacombe Canada

On May 31, 2021, The University of British Columbia indicated that it would review the honorary degree it had granted to Oblate John Fergus O'Grady (1908–1998), Bishop of Prince George, in 1986. O'Grady had been Principal of St. Mary's Indian Residential School in Mission, BC from 1936 to 1939, Kamloops Indian Residential School from 1938 to 1952, and Cariboo Indian Residential School, Williams Lake, BC in 1952.

==== Request for government financial help ====
In July 2000, OMI Superior, Jean-Paul Isabelle requested government financial help with approximately 2,000 lawsuits related to its residential schools. Noting that Saskatchewan alone had 900 claims, with two settling for $100,000 CDN each, Isabelle feared that the order would go bankrupt in Canada. Fr. Camille Piche said he read the first 500 claims before realizing "they were all the same." "Unfortunately some of the lawyers simply do carbon copies of them, simply changing the names and the dates. That makes you doubt about the validity of some of them." The order spends at least $2,000 to process each claim. In 2006, the Oblates were among the Catholic entities that promised a combined contribution of $25 million to a residential school survivors' compensation fund, of which only $3.9 million was paid before the government of Canada released the Church from its financial obligation in 2015. The Oblates stated that their portion of the settlement, which was not publicly disclosed, was paid in full. As of 2021, the organization was divided into multiple corporations, which hold assets totaling at least $200 million; a 2007 bulletin stated that one advantage of creating new such entities was protection of church assets from financial liabilities associated with lawsuits.

==== Alexis Joveneau ====
Beginning November 2017, specific accusations of physical, sexual, psychological, and financial abuse were levied against Alexis_Joveneau, a missionary of the order stationed at Unamenshipit and in remote Innu communities of Quebec along the St. Lawrence River shore from the 1950s until his death in 1992, were revealed as part of the Canada's National Inquiry into Missing and Murdered Indigenous Women and Girls (MMIWG). Survivors, many children at the time of the events, noted their fear of speaking out against Joveneau, with one saying, "I could not talk about it; he was like a god." Joveneau was also noted for his part in the forced displacement of families from Pakuashipi to Unamenshipit in the 1960s, and deliberate removal of benefits for those that returned.

In March 2018, in a statement in response to the testimonies, Oblate Fathers noted they were "deeply concerned" following the testimonies and "fiercely hoped" that the members of the community would find peace. In March 2018 the order opened a hotline for abuse victims.

A participant in five National Film Board of Canada (NFB) documentaries from 1960 to 1985, including three by Québécois director Pierre Perrault, Joveneau was a public face of the OMI mission in Canada. The synopsis of the NFB films, including Attiuk (1960), featuring Joveneau have been edited to include note of his alleged abuse.

==== Sexual abuse lawsuit ====
A class-action lawsuit had been launched against the OMI in March 2018. Despite the OMI initially seeking a settlement, as of 2021, the lawsuit had grown to include 190 Indigenous and non-Indigenous persons from Quebec. Allegations include Oblate attempts to "silence repeated sexual assaults it was well aware of" and include reference to Oblate Alexis Joveneau, Oblate Raynald Coture, and others.

In October 2018, a Radio Canada Enquête investigative report by Quebec journalist Anne Panasuk, unveiled accusations against ten additional Oblate missionaries, including Oblate Raynald Couture, who had served in Wemotaci, an Atikamekw community from 1981 to 1991. After sexual abuse accusations surfaced in the 1980s, Couture was relocated to France by the OMI, and in 2000, after eight Atikamekws filed a formal complaint of sexual assault, Couture was convicted in 2004 and sentenced to 15 months in prison. Couture now admits his crimes, saying that he sought help from the church, but none came. The report included accusations that Oblate Archbishop of Labrador City-Schefferville Peter Sutton was aware of the accusations in 1974. In response to the Enquête report, Cardinal Marc Ouellet of Quebec City thanked Anne Panasuk, stating "The Church must never again be silent."

==== Records of the dead ====
The Canadian Press reported on June 3, 2021, that the OMI refused to release records that might help identify the remains found at residential schools sites, especially as the discovery of 215 potential remains is contrary to existing reports of 51 children known to have died at the facility. The director of the Residential School History and Dialogue Centre of the University of British Columbia noted that the Government of Canada and churches had been fighting over document access for twenty years. J. Michael Miller, Archbishop of Vancouver, called on all Catholic organizations to be transparent with their archives and noted that the Diocese of Vancouver (distinct from the OMI) provided records to the Truth and Reconciliation Commission and they continued to be "available for review". On June 4, 2021, Chief Rosanne Casimir of Tk'emlúps te Secwépemc Nation also noted that the OMI had yet to release any records about the school. Ken Thorson, Provincial of OMI Lacombe Canada, cited his apology of May 30, saying "an apology is easy" but that follow-up was hard. He said that the OMI considered releasing records for the Truth and Reconciliation Commission (begun 2007, with submissions closed in 2015), but acknowledged that "rather than taking a listening stance," the congregation "came together in a defensive posture."

==== 751 unmarked graves at Marieval ====
On June 24, 2021, Chief Cadmus Delorme of Cowessess First Nation in Saskatchewan, announced that searchers using ground-penetrating radar had discovered 751 unmarked graves near the former OMI-run Marieval Indian Residential School (also known as Greyson or Lac Croche / Crooked Lake) site on the Cowessess 73 reserve. The significant find made international headlines, with The Washington Post calling the discovery part of Canada's "devastating legacy of one of the darkest chapters of its history." Donald Bolen, Archbishop of Regina, noted that the discovery "brings us face to face with the brutal legacy of the Indian Residential School system".

The findings in Marieval and Kamloops are part of a larger tragedy. They are a shameful reminder of the systemic racism, discrimination, and injustice that Indigenous peoples have faced – and continue to face – in this country. And together, we must acknowledge this truth, learn from our past, and walk the shared path of reconciliation, so we can build a better future.

— Justin Trudeau, Prime Minister of Canada,

In 2018, Chief Cadmus Delorme wrote to the Donald Bolen, Archbishop of Regina, asking for funding to restore the Cowessess cemetery. Less than six months later, the adjoining church was destroyed by fire. Work to recover graves began in 2019, when the Cowessess First Nation received $70,000 for the work via part of the Roman Catholic Archdiocese of Regina's insurance settlement after the fire and it was agreed that the church would not be rebuilt and the land would return to the Cowessess. Work on the cemetery was delayed for over a year due to the COVID-19 pandemic, and in March 2021, Chief Cadmus Delorme announced that the community had begun radar scanning to find remains at the site, and that the end goal was to "identify, to mark, and to build a monument in honouring and recognizing the bodies." From June 2–23, their efforts found the 751 unmarked graves and they marked each with a flag.

The pain is real, the pain is there and the pain hasn't gone away. As we heal, every Cowessess citizen has a family member in that gravesite. To know there's some unmarked, it continues the pain.

— Chief Cadmus Delorme,

Noting that the unmarked graves likely included adults, the gravesite had long been said to contain unmarked graves from the local community including some, Chief Cadmus Delorme asserted, where markers were destroyed by church leadership. Donald Bolen, Archbishop of Regina affirmed the community's pain regarding the destruction, illustrating one story where an Oblate priest had destroyed headstones "in a way that was reprehensible", echoing RéAnne Letourneau, a Sisters of the Presentation of Mary, who wrote in the 2019 Archdiocese of Regina Annual Report that the diocese had heard reports of a pastor who bulldozed parts of the cemetery 50 years prior because of a conflict with Cowessess leadership. Other accounts cited the 1970 handover, when the Cowessess First Nation took over the cemetery from the church, saying graves were plowed under or destroyed.

==== Marieval Indian Residential School ====
Established in 1874, after Treaty 4 at Fort Qu'Appelle was signed and Cowessess 73 reserve formed, OMI's Crooked Lake Mission in the Qu'Appelle Valley began. Led by Oblate Jules Decorby, followed by Oblate Agapit Page, it operated within the Roman Catholic Archdiocese of Saint Boniface under Oblate Archbishop Alexandre-Antonin Taché. A log building day school for Cowessess children opened in 1885 with Page as principal. Students transferred to the newly built Qu'Appelle Indian Residential School in 1884 and the log building was torn down. Oblate missionaries continued to visit the area from Lebret.

Thirteen years later, OMI presence was a constant in the community, with eleven brothers and 39 priests serving the mission from 1897 to 1967. In 1898, four Sisters of Notre Dame des Missions de Lyon arrived from France to begin a boarding school at Cowessess called the Holy Heart of Mary, however friction with the Oblates resulted in their departure. In 1900 they were replaced first by lay teachers, then the Sisters of St. Joseph of St. Hyacinthe in July 1901. The first principal of the school was Oblate Théophile Campeau (1897–1900). When the school was granted federal government funding as a residential school for 40 children in 1901, Oblate Siméon Perreault (1900–1912) was principal.

In 1903, Oblate Perreault requested 40 acres of land from the Cowessess for a school and mission and received verbal permission. As formal paperwork was done, Perrault increased the request to 350 acres. The surrender of land was signed in November 1908 under condition that if it ceased use for a school or mission, it would revert to the band.

In 1908 the establishment of a post office under the name of "Marieval" set the area's official name, and Perreault became its first postmaster—administering Cowessess access to mail. With the exception of Principal Jean-Baptiste Beys (1912–1918), for over 60 years Oblates served as parish priest, principal, and postmaster for the community, including: Gustave Fafard (1918–1920), Joseph Carrière (1920–1933), Placide Châtelain (1933–1938), Vincent de Varennes (1938–1944), Jean Lemire (1944–1952), Regalis (Royal) Carrière (1952–1961), and Gaston (Garry) Gélinas (1961–1964). After Gélinas' resignation in 1964, the postmaster role was filled by the community. Oblates Gérard Nogue (1964–1971) and Adéodat Ruest (1971–1972) were the last Oblate principals at Marieval, as its administration shifted to the government.

==== Fort Alexander Indian Residential School ====
Oblate Arthur Masse was arrested on June 16, 2022, charged with indecent assault of a student at OMI-administered Fort Alexander Residential School. The crime was alleged to have been committed between 1968 and 1970 when the student was 10 years old. The arrest of Masse, aged 92, was the culmination of a decade-long RCMP criminal investigation that included over 80 agents, who conducted over 700 interviews and analyzed thousands of historical documents, resulting in 75 statements from witnesses and victims of abuse at the school. Masse was released pending trial on July 20, 2022.

== List of Canadian Indian residential schools ==
As part of its mission in Canada, the OMI ran at least 57 residential schools with locations in seven provinces and territories. During a penitential pilgrimage to Canada in July 2022, Pope Francis reiterated the apologies of the Catholic Church for its role in running those schools, acknowledging the system as genocide.

=== British Columbia ===
OMI residential schools in British Columbia included locations in Cranbrook, Kakawis (Meares Island), Kamloops, North Vancouver, and Williams Lake.

- St. Mary's Indian Residential School, Mission (1863–1984). Its aim was to bring Indigenous Sto:lo people to a Catholic and agrarian lifestyle. Later, the school became a federally mandated residential school named St. Mary's. Closed in 1984, it was the last residential school in British Columbia. It is now a cultural centre operated by the Sto:lo people. There an operating OMI cemetery on site with graves of priests and nuns dating back to at least 1880.
- Kamloops Indian Residential School, Kamloops (1890–1969). Subject of widespread outrage beginning May 26, 2021, after 215 officially undocumented unmarked graves were discovered on the property via ground-penetrating radar, resulting in lowering of flags across the country, a call to examine all former residential school grounds across Canada, and plans to honour the deceased and reunite them with their relatives.
- Kootenay Indian Residential School, Cranbrook (1912–1970)
- Lejac Residential School, Fort St. James (1874–1976)
- St. Paul's Indian Residential School, North Vancouver (1899–1958)
- Lower Post
- Alexis Creek
- Christie School, Kakawis
- Sechelt

=== Alberta ===
OMI residential schools in Alberta included locations in Brocket, Cardston, Cluny, Wabasca (Desmarais), Dunbow (High River), Fort Vermilion, Maskwacis (Hobbema), Joussard, St. Albert, and St. Paul.

- Lac La Biche Residential School, Lac La Biche (1893–1898)
- Ermineskin School, Maskwacis
- Crowfoot School

=== Saskatchewan ===
OMI residential schools in Saskatchewan included locations in Beauval, Delmas, Duck Lake, Lebret, Marieval, Sturgeon Landing, and Onion Lake Cree Nation.

- Beauval Indian Residential School, Beauval (1895–1983)
- Qu'Appelle Indian Residential School, Lebret (1884–1969)
- St. Michael, Duck Lake
- Onion Lake

=== Manitoba ===
OMI residential schools in Manitoba included locations in Cross Lake, Sagkeeng First Nation (Fort Alexander), Pine Creek First Nation, The Pas, Sandy Bay, and Winnipeg.

- Pine Creek School, Camperville
- Cross Lake

=== Ontario ===
OMI residential schools in Ontario included locations in Fort Albany First Nation, Fort Frances, McIntosh and Spanish.

- St. Anne's Indian Residential School, Fort Albany (1902–1976)
- Spanish Indian Residential Schools, Spanish (1874–1965)
- Sandy Bay School

=== Quebec ===
OMI residential schools in Quebec included locations in Amos, Mashteuiatsh (Pointe-Bleue), and Sept-Îles.

=== Nova Scotia ===
- Shubenacadie Indian Residential School, Shubenacadie (February 5, 1930 – June 22, 1967). This was the only residential school in Atlantic Canada.

=== Northwest Territories ===
OMI residential schools in the Northwest Territories included locations in Chesterfield Inlet, Fort Chipewyan, and Fort Resolution.

- Aklavik
