= Fontaine et al. v Canada (Attorney General) et al., 2015 SKQB 220 =

- Coat of arms of Saskatchewan
- Court: Court of Queen's Bench for Saskatchewan
- Decided: July 16, 2015
- Citations: Fontaine v Canada (Attorney General), 2015 SKQB 220, 389 DLR (4th) 749

Court membership
- Judge sitting: Gabrielson J.

Case opinions
- Enforceable settlement relating to IRSSA obligations of CCEPIRSS and Catholic Entities

Keywords
- Indian Residential Schools Settlement Agreement; Consensus ad idem

Fontaine et al. v Canada (Attorney General) et al., (Note: The case names "Fontaine et al. v. Canada (Attorney General) et al." and "Fontaine v. Canada (Attorney General)" can also refer to a variety of other cases related to the Indian Residential Schools Settlement Agreement. Some sources have referred to this case with the citation Fontaine v Saskatchewan (Attorney General), 2015 SKQB 220.) 2015 SKQB 220, 389 DLR (4th) 749, is a decision of the Court of Queen's Bench for Saskatchewan which found that the Government of Canada, the Catholic entities party to the Indian Residential Schools Settlement Agreement (IRSSA), and the Corporation of Catholic Entities Party to the IRSSA (CCEPIRSS) had reached "an enforceable settlement of all issues between these parties relating to CCEPIRSS' obligations under the Settlement Agreement." The case became controversial because The Globe and Mail, and subsequently CBC News, claimed that the decision had enabled the Catholic entities to escape one or more of their IRSSA obligations that allegedly had not been met. Canadian Catholic authorities have maintained that all the obligations were met.

The government began an appeal of the judgment, then dropped it; this decision became a further topic of controversy because their reason for not pursuing the appeal remained obscure for years. Documents released under the Access to Information Act in 2022 revealed that the lawyer who argued the case on behalf of the government had expected to lose, and that the government had concluded that an appeal would be unlikely to succeed.

== Background ==
As part of the Indian Residential Schools Settlement Agreement, approximately 50 Catholic entities, such as dioceses and religious congregations, agreed to make financial and in-kind contributions with a value of $54 million to $79 million to support healing and reconciliation programs. They had three specific obligations:

- A cash contribution of $29 million. $8,344,575 paid out in compensation for residential school abuse claims before the IRSSA was counted as part of this contribution, leaving a further $20,655,425 (the "Net Amount") to pay.
- In-kind services valued at $25 million.
- A seven-year "best efforts" fundraising campaign with a target of $25 million. The seven-year period for the campaign began in September 2007 with the implementation of the IRSSA and ended in September 2014. (Note: The end date for the fundraising obligation can be calculated using Schedule O-3, §3.9; it is referred to by the following sources: The Anglican, Presbyterian and United Church agreements state that calculations shall assume that the "Catholic fundraising campaign will terminate seven years from the date this Agreement comes into force", unless a subsequent agreement changes that; In January 2014, CCEPIRSS chair Archbishop Gérard Pettipas expressed "frustration" that the campaign was "not going to meet" its $25 million goal: "Short of a miracle, I don't think we're going to be able to make it." He said that "[a]ll the elements of the settlement" were "supposed to conclude in September 2014", though "the work of the Truth and Reconciliation Commission" had been "extended another year to 2015."; In February 2014, AANDC senior analyst Pamela Stellick deposed that the campaign was "to end in 2014"; In May 2014, Anglican leaders anticipated that the campaign would end in September 2014; its failure would release them from paying the portion of the Anglican IRSSA contribution that was proportional to the outcome of the campaign; A November 5, 2014 decision note for Minister of Aboriginal Affairs and Northern Development Bernard Valcourt gives an end date of September 19, 2014; A letter from AANDC Assistant Deputy Minister Andrew Saranchuk to Ron Kidd states that the "seven-year period" for the campaign "concluded October 19, 2014" (one-month difference from other sources); An April 21, 2016 memo for Minister of Justice Jody Wilson-Raybould prepared by Assistant General Counsel Duaine Simms states that the "seven-year period" for the fundraising obligation "ended in September 2014"; A 2017 Anglican Journal article states that the "Roman Catholic campaign ended in September 2014") "Best efforts" would be "deemed to have been made where the fund-raising campaign demonstrates on a Canada-Wide level in each of the seven years an approach and means that is consistent with the approach and means used by professionally managed national fundraising campaigns, including those operated by universities and hospital foundations".

The Catholic entities established the Corporation of Catholic Entities Party to the IRSSA (CCEPIRSS), a not-for-profit corporation, "for the exclusive purpose of implementing and carrying out the Catholic Entities’ obligations under the Settlement Agreement."

=== First Request for Directions ===
On December 24, 2013, the Government of Canada submitted a Request for Directions (Note: Justice Gabrielson described the Request for Directions process as follows: "The RFD process was established by the Implementation Orders made by each of the nine courts that approved the IRSSA. The SKQB Implementation Order is dated March 8, 2007. The Implementation Orders are substantially identical. Appended to each is the 'Court Administration Protocol', which provides for what it terms 'a streamlined process for addressing all matters that require court orders, directions or consideration during the course of the administration (of the Settlement Agreement)'.") (RFD #1) to the Court of Queen's Bench for Saskatchewan objecting to an attempt by CCEPIRSS to deduct what Canada considered to be excessive and inappropriate administrative costs of $2 million from the Net Amount of $20,655,425. It was possible under the IRSSA for CCEPIRSS to use interest accrued on the funds it held to pay "reasonable administration costs"; if the interest was insufficient, CCEPIRSS could deduct such costs from the "capital amount" it held with the written consent of the government, which the government could not "unreasonably withhold". It was also specified that at least 80% of the money paid toward the Net Amount was to be transferred to the Aboriginal Healing Foundation (AHF). CCEPIRSS wanted to pay the AHF 80% of the money remaining after deducting administrative costs from the Net Amount; with a $2 million deduction, that would give the AHF $14,924,340 (80% of $18,655,425). Canada contended that the IRSSA did not permit CCEPIRSS to compute the amount owing to the AHF in this fashion, and that the AHF was owed $1.6 million more ($16,524,340, which is 80% of the full Net Amount of $20,655,425). Canada also argued that CCEPIRSS was inappropriately including legal fees in its administrative costs (in a January 27, 2014 response, CCEPIRSS denied including legal fees.)

In the following months, the parties compiled affidavits setting out their views of the evidence in the case and cross-examined each other's witnesses. On May 15, the government submitted a factum expanding its case against CCEPIRSS, alleging that CCEPIRSS had "breached its obligations" under the IRSSA and had a "large number of serious accounting discrepancies". The factum asked the Court for an oppression remedy under the Saskatchewan Non-profit Corporations Act, seeking an order that would, among other things, direct CCEPIRSS to pay the disputed amount to the AHF, direct CCEPIRSS to "recover all amounts paid to any law firm that had a partner occupying a formal position with the Corporation", declare CCEPIRSS to be "in default as per Section 3.16 of Schedule O-3", and launch a "forensic investigation into the financial affairs of CCEPIRSS" at CCEPIRSS' expense. On May 24, Minister of Aboriginal Affairs and Northern Development Bernard Valcourt "provided instructions to enter into mediation", but the May 29–30 mediation was unsuccessful. On June 12, Justice Gabrielson rescheduled a hearing for the case from June 16 to July 17–18, granting a motion for adjournment brought by CCEPIRSS on the grounds "that the dispute underlying Canada's Request for Direction has grown and that its complexion has changed", and that CCEPIRSS needed a "more complete evidentiary record." The hearing was later postponed to October 9–10 at CCEPIRSS' request.

=== Settlement negotiations ===
In a June 26, 2014 letter to Department of Justice lawyer Alexander Gay, CCEPIRSS' lawyer, Gordon Kuski, offered to "settle all matters between the parties" by paying $1 million in exchange for "a General Release with respect to all matters between the Parties," and "more specifically", "a Release and an Indemnity in accordance with the terms contemplated by Section 4.5 and Section 4.6 of the Settlement Agreement, Schedule 'O-3'".

According to an August 7, 2014 Aboriginal Affairs and Northern Development Canada (AANDC) decision note, the government subsequently consulted the AHF, which "indicated that a settlement of $1 million or more would be acceptable." According to an August 12, 2015 decision note, the Assembly of First Nations was consulted before Canada and CCEPIRSS agreed on a figure of $1.2 million.

On September 18, 2014, Gay emailed Kuski: "The clients accept $1.2M as a quantum. The thing that needs to be resolved is the paperwork and the wording on the release documents. How do you propose to proceed?" Kuski replied: "Thanks for this. We have a deal. I'll call you today to discuss logistics." Kuski followed up with a letter describing the settlement, including language about a release under §4.5 and §4.6. Gay replied by email:

I received your letter of today's date.

For the moment, we have agreement on quantum. We have no agreement on the terms of the settlement. I have not seen the paper that you propose. Paras. 4.5 and 4.6 of Schedule O-3 say what they say and the Catholic Entities benefit from these terms, regardless of what is said in the eventual release. I am not sure that we need to re-state what has been agreed to in the Settlement Agreement. In any event, I am sure that we will be able to discuss and get this thing finalized. I am open to suggestions.

Later that day, Kuski sent a draft General Final Release, which was mostly consistent with his previous letter of June 26, but added a release under §4.7 as well.

On September 30, 2014, Gay sent Kuski an amended draft General Final Release that would release the Catholic entities only from matters related to RFD #1. He did not redline Kuski's draft or explicitly advise him of the significant difference between versions. Kuski replied on October 1 advocating for the broader release; Gay's response included the sentence, "We may have a problem." On November 10, Canada refused to consent to the broader release. CCEPIRSS and the Catholic entities commenced a second RFD (RFD #2) arguing that an enforceable settlement had been reached. RFD #2 was heard by Justice Gabrielson on June 3, 2015.

== Opinion of the Court ==
Justice Gabrielson found that an enforceable settlement did exist: in exchange for a payment of $1.2 million, the Catholic entities were entitled to releases and indemnities under §4.5 and §4.6 of the IRSSA, but not §4.7. He rejected Canada's position that the parties had agreed only on the amount to pay, and would deal "with quantum first and terms second":

Canada's interpretation of the communications between the parties presumes that CCEPIRSS and the Catholic Entities would agree to pay a significant sum of money in a settlement without knowing precisely what it was they were settling. In my view, that is not a reasonable interpretation of what transpired. The fact of a settlement implies a release, and it is not logical to say that the quantum of the settlement was agreed to but the fundamental and essential scope of the release was not. That is not how reasonable parties negotiate settlements.

If Canada's position during settlement negotiations was that it would only accept $1.2 million to settle the narrower matters raised by RFD #1, then one would have expected Canada to say so very clearly at a much earlier time. The balance of the record before me proves that, despite the relatively narrow issues raised by RFD #1, the parties were negotiating with respect to all matters at issue between them in relation to the Settlement Agreement. ...

== "Protective" notice of appeal and negotiations over release ==
Heavily redacted documents released under the Access to Information Act provide evidence of how government staff reacted to the decision and what they did next. On the day the case was decided, Department of Justice lawyer Wayne Schafer, who had represented Canada for RFD #2, forwarded the decision to five people at AANDC with the comment, "It went almost exactly as we thought it might". On July 20, an email with "initial thoughts" from Nancy Joyes at AANDC included this sentence: "The outcome is not a huge surprise, Canada was in a very weak position going into the hearing." On July 28, Ronald Schmalz at AANDC responded to an update from his colleague Duaine Simms on "Justice's assessment of Decision" with the comment: "Thanks for the update ... look very much forward to receiving it. I gather it will recommend not appealing the decision."

An August 12 AANDC decision note for the Deputy Minister sought instructions on whether to appeal. The recommended course of action is redacted in the ATI release. Deputy Minister Colleen Swords concurred with the recommendation on August 13. On August 14, an email from Joyes stated: "We've just had confirmation and received the signed BN from the Deputy that Canada will file a 'protective' notice of appeal." Around this time, (Note: The Notice of Appeal is dated August 14, 2015. The September 3, 2015 Decision Note for the Minister states that the appeal was filed on August 19.) Canada filed a Notice of Appeal in the Court of Appeal for Saskatchewan. The grounds specified for the appeal were that the judge had allegedly "erred in law" by finding that there was an enforceable settlement and that Canada's counsel had the authority to bind Canada to a settlement, and "made palpable and overriding errors in his assessment of the facts relating to the negotiations of a prospective agreement".

A September 3 AANDC decision note for the Minister expressed concern that the court decision was "unclear on the scope of the release, specifically whether [CCEPIRSS] was released from all further obligations (financial and non-financial)." The note states that the "protective notice of appeal" had been filed "to enable Canada and [CCEPIRSS] to discuss the terms of the Order and the content of the release". The recommendation in the decision note, with which Minister Bernard Valcourt concurred on September 4, was that the Department of Justice should "be instructed to seek a court order and release that would include the reimbursement of the previously agreed $1.2 million in return for a release from all three financial obligations", and that if they failed to "secure a release limited to the financial obligations", the Department of Justice should pursue the appeal. According to the "Considerations" section of the note, "[i]ncluding all three financial obligations in the order and the settlement" would not "create significant issues": the cash and in-kind obligations had "been met", and with respect to the fundraising obligation, Canada was "not in a position to take enforcement measures" (as Canada's affiant Pamela Stellick had previously admitted), and "the likelihood of compelling the Catholic Entities to meet their remaining fund-raising obligations" was "very low". However, "releasing [CCEPIRSS and the Catholic Entities] from some of the non-financial obligations could pose significant risks for Canada": "Of particular concern to Canada would be releasing the Catholic Entities from obligations such as cooperating in the defence or resolution of all Indian Residential Schools abuse claims outside of the settlement agreement."

An October 30 memo for the Deputy Minister stated that CCEPIRSS had "agreed upon the General Final Release" as of October 28. The memo also stated: "October 30, 2015 is Canada's deadline to perfect its appeal in this matter; however, the [remainder of bullet point redacted]". Deputy Minister Swords signed a General Final Release on behalf of Canada on October 30. The release included a recital stating that "Canada and the Catholic Entities and CCEPIRSS have agreed that paragraphs 5 and 45 of the Judicial Ruling are understood to be limited to the matters before Justice Gabrielson, namely the Specific Financial Obligations". On November 10, Canada abandoned the appeal.

In an April 18, 2016 Department of Justice Question Period note, Duaine Simms stated that CCEPIRSS paid $1.2 million to the Legacy of Hope Foundation on January 11, 2016 (Note: According to the Foundation's financial statements, it received the cheque on January 8. An April 21 memo from Simms states that CCEPIRSS delivered the cheque on January 12.) and Canada provided the release to CCEPIRSS on January 12.

== Controversies ==
The decision became a topic of political controversy in April 2016 when The Globe and Mail alleged that it had allowed the Catholic entities to renege on the fundraising obligation. The Globe's reporting on the government's decision to drop its appeal of the judgment created a further controversy that persisted because the government did not explain why the appeal was abandoned. In 2021, the controversy broadened as CBC News and the Globe impugned the Catholic entities' performance of all three financial obligations. (In 2023, CBC and the Globe won the 2021 Michener Award for their reporting.) Canadian Catholic authorities have maintained that all the obligations were met.

=== Fundraising obligation ===
The Court noted that Canada's affiant Pamela Stellick had stated that CCEPIRSS had "failed to meet their $25M fundraising obligation". She admitted that the "obligation to raise funds is subject to best efforts and thus Canada is not in a position to take enforcement measures." Cross-examined on the government's position, she said, "I think there is some concerns perhaps that more efforts couldn't have been made to raise further funding from across Canada." When asked what suggestions the government had for improving the campaign, she answered, "I don't think it is Canada's place to offer or suggest or tell them how to run their fundraising campaign." During RFD #2, Department of Justice lawyer Alexander Gay expressed "some concern" about whether the Catholic entities had satisfied the fundraising obligation, but had "no knowledge" as to whether the government believed the Catholic entities were in default of that obligation.

Redacted AANDC and Department of Justice briefing notes released under the Access to Information Act also give mixed signals about whether government staff thought the legal fundraising obligation had been satisfied. A November 5, 2014 AANDC decision note for the Minister includes the comment, "Of the remaining obligations, there is a question about whether the Entities have made "best efforts" to raise a further $25 million through a charitable campaign." (The remainder of the bullet point is redacted.) The same document summarizes the fundraising obligation as "[b]est efforts to raise $25 million by way of a charitable campaign until September 19, 2014, which is seven years from the Implementation Date of the Settlement Agreement". A September 3, 2015 AANDC decision note for the Minister takes the position that "[i]ncluding all three financial obligations in the order and the settlement" would not "create significant issues": "two of the three obligations" had "been met", and with respect to the fundraising obligation, although only "$3.5 million of the $25 million fundraising commitment" had been raised, and "the July 16, 2015 decision could release the Catholic Entities from the $21.5 million shortfall", Canada was "not in a position to take enforcement measures" (echoing Stellick), and "the likelihood of compelling the Catholic Entities to meet their remaining fund-raising obligations" was "very low". In April 2016, three Department of Justice Question Period notes addressed the issue within the space of two weeks; the first says that Canada had concluded that a court would find that the fundraising obligation had been met, the second says it was "unfortunate that the Church went to court claiming that the settlement discussions relieved the Church of all further fundraising obligations", and the third says that Canada would encourage the Church to "follow the example" of the Protestant parties to the settlement and "fulfil the promises they made...to make financial contributions to Indigenous healing and reconciliation programs."

==== April 2016 Globe and Mail article and subsequent controversy ====
The fundraising campaign fell far short of its $25 million goal, with only $3.7 million raised when it ended in September 2014. In January 2016, The Catholic Register reported on the "failure" of the campaign, commenting that the "$21-million shortfall" had "added another challenge to the task of reconciliation between Canadian churches and Native communities." However, in an April 17, 2016 article, The Globe and Mail posited that the campaign had not merely failed, but that something more sinister had happened: the "Catholic Church" had allegedly reneged on the fundraising obligation by exploiting a "miscommunication by a federal lawyer" to obtain the 2015 Fontaine decision, forcing the government to grant a release from "any obligation it might have had to continue with a dismal fundraising campaign." The article did not mention that the fundraising obligation had any contractually specified time limit, or that it had been scheduled to end in September 2014, approximately ten months before the judicial decision. Some subsequent articles described the campaign as a "seven-year campaign", without explaining that the seven-year duration originated in the contract or stating when the seven-year period ended.

The Globe's reporting gave rise to a political controversy, with NDP Members of Parliament pressing the Liberal government on the issue. The controversy expanded as the Globe reported that the government had launched an appeal of the court decision, then dropped it (see § Government's silence on reason for dropping appeal), and that the failure of the Catholic fundraising campaign had reduced the amounts owed by the Anglican and United Churches. In the Department of Justice, Assistant General Counsel Duaine Simms produced three Question Period notes and a memorandum addressing major elements of the Globe's coverage as they arose; these were not public at the time, but redacted versions are included in a 2022 ATI release. In an April 18 note addressing the April 17 article, the "proposed response" ended by stating that, with respect to the Catholic fundraising obligation, Canada had "determined that an independent arbiter such as a court would conclude that they had met their obligation under the Settlement Agreement". The government's public responses in Parliament came from Minister of Indigenous and Northern Affairs Carolyn Bennett and her Parliamentary Secretary, Yvonne Jones,, who said that the previous Conservative government was responsible for allegedly letting the Catholic Church evade its obligations. On April 19, Bennett declared: "We believe that the Catholic Church has to honour its obligation. This is not the time to get off on a technicality." She also said that "the previous government" had "left no legal recourse".

Simms produced an April 21 Question Period note and a longer memorandum in response to the Globe's article on the dropped appeal (see § Government's silence on reason for dropping appeal.) The "proposed response" in the note stated that it was "unfortunate that the Church went to court claiming that the settlement discussions relieved the Church of all further fundraising obligations." In the "background" section, Simms wrote about the "overall financial contributions to the settlement agreement" from the various church denominations: "the Anglicans raised and paid $20 million, the United Church approximately $3 to $4 million and the Catholic Church paid the $29 million cash plus the $3.7 million." In an April 27 Question Period note responding to the Globe article on the reduction of the Anglican and United Church obligations, the "proposed response" stated that Canada was "encouraging the Catholic Church to follow the example of the other religious entities who were involved in the operation of Indian Residential Schools and fulfil the promises they made in the [IRSSA] to make financial contributions to Indigenous healing and reconciliation programs." Simms had a revised comment on the "overall financial contributions": "the Anglican Entities contributed approximately $13 million, the United Church contributed approximately $4.3 million, the Presbyterian Church contributed approximately $1.7 million, and the Catholic Entities contributed approximately $57.7 million." (The Anglican Church stated that they contributed $12.9 million. The United Church stated that they contributed $6.45 million.)

Approached for comment by the Globe after the initial story broke, former AFN National Chief Phil Fontaine, who helped to negotiate the IRSSA and also assisted the Catholic entities with the fundraising campaign, said, "The government is ultimately responsible for meeting all of the financial obligations [...] I don't know about legally, but there's a moral obligation here [...] We're dealing with close to 80,000 survivors and it's important for them that they be treated fairly and justly." Describing his work with the fundraising campaign, he said, "We tried very hard to meet the commitment that the Catholic church entities faced. We were unsuccessful." Fontaine also said that he believed the "best efforts" required by the IRSSA had been made. Senator Murray Sinclair, who chaired the Truth and Reconciliation Commission (TRC), "pointed out that one of the commission's calls to action was for the parties to the settlement agreement – the churches and the government – to establish permanent funding for healing and reconciliation." He added, "When two of the defendants make a deal between themselves that ends up in a loss of funding to the survivors, then who really suffers?" Minister Carolyn Bennett dismissed the idea that the government should "compensate for the shortfall", saying that the Catholic Church should pay and that the government would "apply deeper pressure" to that end. Fontaine subsequently told the Globe that reconciliation was "not at risk because of the funding issue", and that survivors' interests had been met through financial compensation, an apology from Prime Minister Harper, AHF funding and the TRC. "So anyone who suggests that somehow someone is being shortchanged, there's a real misunderstanding here. Not that I would ever suggest to anyone that the money wouldn't be welcome."

Interviewed in an April 27 Catholic Register article, CCEPIRSS chair Archbishop Gérard Pettipas rejected the idea that the Catholic entities had "used legal trickery to sidestep their obligations", saying, "It isn't accurate. [...] There was a cash contribution. There was in-kind payment. There was a best-efforts campaign. We did all those. There wasn't any weaselling out." (In a separate document dated April 21, Pettipas stated that the government had been "included in conversations dealing with the fundraising plan as designed by the fundraising firm", and had been "informed on a yearly basis of the financial status of the fundraising campaign. ... The status of the campaign was well known so it is difficult to understand what it is represented that there was a misstep which would have taken place.") The Catholic Register also interviewed Joanne Villemaire, senior vice president at Ketchum Philanthropy, the professional fundraising organization hired for the "Moving Forward Together" campaign. She said it was a "very tough project" and "significant effort" was put into it. However, according to the Register, "[w]hile [the campaign] did manage to raise money from Catholic dioceses, religious orders and associations, neither wealthy individuals nor corporations were ready to step up and become lead donors, said Villemaire." Pettipas stated that the Catholic entities dismissed Ketchum in 2013: "Not because they were doing a bad job. They were doing a terrific job, but it wasn't working. We were spending more money doing administration and promotion than we were taking in. On a $25-million campaign, you can expect to spend 10 per cent or $2.5 million on all that. But we had already spent $2 million and got almost nothing. ..." After the departure of Ketchum, the Catholic entities launched a nationwide pew collection, raising "just shy of $1 million".

Central to the April 17, 2016 Globe article was a March 2016 letter about the legal dispute from AANDC Assistant Deputy Minister Andrew Saranchuk to "concerned citizen" Ron Kidd. In a 2017 APTN News article, Kidd, described as a "former provincial tax auditor, self-appointed church watchdog, and gay rights activist", claimed to have been "instrumental in leading Globe reporters to the original story and then working closely with NDP MP Charlie Angus' staff to put detailed questions to the government to access more information about the Church's obligations." Kidd also alleged that $37,875,660 of "$54 million" in Catholic obligations had not been paid; he appears to have calculated this figure by subtracting $16,124,340 (the amount paid to the AHF and its successor organization; see § Payments to healing programs) from $54 million, incorrectly assuming that $54 million was owed to the AHF.

==== 2018 House of Commons motion ====
In May 2018, the House of Commons passed a motion introduced by NDP MP Charlie Angus which, in addition to calling for a papal apology for the Catholic Church's role in the residential school system, called upon "the Canadian Catholic Church to live up to their moral obligation and the spirit of the 2006 Indian Residential School Settlement Agreement and resume best efforts to raise the full amount of the agreed upon funds". The Canadian Conference of Catholic Bishops (CCCB) objected to a draft version of the motion, writing that the Catholic entities "were legally deemed to have fulfilled the requirements of the settlement agreement by a judicial review", and that the entities, "together with other dioceses, institutes, and national Catholic organizations, continue to be involved in efforts across the country to provide in-kind contributions which financially speaking go well beyond the scope of the Settlement Agreement".

==== 2021 to present: renewed controversy and new fundraising campaign ====
In June 2021, CBC News renewed the accusation that the "Catholic Church" had reneged on the fundraising obligation. Law professors Mary Ellen Turpel-Lafond of UBC (Note: Turpel-Lafond's employment as a UBC professor ended in December 2022 after a CBC News investigation cast doubt on her claim to be a "treaty Indian of Cree ancestry" and found that she had made "inaccurate public claims about her academic accomplishments.") and Kathleen Mahoney of the University of Calgary provided support for this thesis. (Mahoney was Chief Negotiator for the AFN for the IRSSA and is married to former AFN National Chief Phil Fontaine, the representative plaintiff in the case.) As paraphrased by CBC, Turpel-Lafond alleged that "the Catholic Church betrayed survivors and used 'legal trickery' to escape paying the full $25-million compensation." Turpel-Lafond, who was also director of the UBC Indian Residential School History and Dialogue Centre at the time, described the case as "an embarrassment to the legal profession in Saskatchewan," calling for a review by the provincial attorney general.

In July 2021, CBC News alleged that "[s]ince signing the landmark [IRSSA] in 2005, Canadian Catholic dioceses have either spent or are fundraising $292 million for cathedrals and other church buildings". (The IRSSA was signed in 2006, not 2005. Nearly $220 million of the alleged spending was attributed to the archdioceses of Moncton, Montreal, Ottawa, and Toronto, and the dioceses of London (Note: CBC News' list has separate entries for London and Windsor. Windsor is not a diocese; the city of Windsor, Ontario is in the Diocese of London.) and Saint John, which were not among the Catholic entities party to the IRSSA. CBC edited its article after publication; the revised version differs from the version originally published on July 6 in that it says that the Archdiocese of Toronto "had no residential schools on its territory" and did not "participate" in the IRSSA.) CBC stated that "[c]ritics" considered the alleged fundraising figures to "throw into question the church's legal claim it gave 'best efforts' to help survivors." (The IRSSA specified that "best efforts" would be "deemed to have been made" if, throughout its seven years, the fundraising campaign was national in scope and used an "approach and means" consistent with those of "professionally managed national fundraising campaigns, including those operated by universities and hospital foundations." In a section of its June 29 article focused on explaining the "best efforts" language, CBC News quoted from the relevant section of the IRSSA in a way that obscured its logical structure, leaving the standard for proving whether "best efforts" were made unclear.) (Note: Schedule O-3, §3.9.1: Best efforts shall be deemed to have been made where the fund-raising campaign demonstrates on a Canada-Wide level in each of the seven years an approach and means that is consistent with the approach and means used by professionally managed national fundraising campaigns, including those operated by universities and hospital foundations. CBC News: Then, in Section 3.9 of Schedule O-3, there was one more promise: Catholic churches across the country promised to come up with another $25 million. They legally agreed to a cross-Canada effort "consistent with the approach and means used by professionally managed national fundraising campaigns, including those operated by universities and hospital foundations." The church was required to prove it gave its "best efforts.")

In an August 2021 response to "recent reporting on [CCEPIRSS]", the CCCB stated that it was their "understanding that the Catholic entities party to the IRSSA honoured all their settlement obligations." They wrote that the fundraising campaign had "represented a sincere, national push to engage Catholics and non-Catholics in fundraising projects that would advance healing and reconciliation", including "outreach to major donors, regional committees tasked with engaging local businesses, and pew collections across the country", but "did not yield the results that many had hoped for." The statement added that Canadian bishops were "looking at creative new ways to support fundraising efforts across the country." In September 2021, the CCCB announced a new national fundraising campaign, with a target of $30 million over five years, "to support healing and reconciliation initiatives for residential school survivors, their families, and their communities." The structure and leadership team for the new Indigenous Reconciliation Fund were announced in January 2022. In July 2023, the CCCB stated that the Fund had raised $11,264,838, awarded grants to "over 50 projects", and was "on track to meet its goal."

=== Cash obligation ===
In 2016, The Globe and Mail had described the cash obligation as having been met. However, in July 2021, the Globe and CBC News obtained the government's May 2014 factum and reported on the allegations of inappropriate expense deductions and "serious accounting discrepancies" contained therein. In August 2021, the Globe reported that it had obtained CCEPIRSS financial statements covering the fiscal years ending 2009 to 2016, (Note: CCEPIRSS was established in 2006, so financial statements for 2009-2016 would not give a complete picture of its total income or expenses.) which showed that "the Catholic entities that were party to the settlement ultimately contributed $24.2-million", with "about $860,000" more contributed by "other outside entities"; CCEPIRSS "deducted $6.46-million for expenses over eight years." According to the Globe, "[h]ealing initiatives for residential school survivors got $18.6-million." The Globe and CBC News subsequently alleged that the cash obligation had not been met, with CBC News noting that the CCCB rejected this allegation. A January 2022 legal analysis commissioned by the CCCB took the position that "CCEPIRSS only recovered $399,999.00 of its administrative costs out of the cash contributions from the Catholic Entities towards the $29,000,000 cash payment."

==== Payments to healing programs ====
The Catholic entities paid $14,924,340 to the Aboriginal Healing Foundation, $1.2 million to the AHF's successor Legacy of Hope Foundation after resolving the legal dispute, and $2,556,000 to Returning to Spirit. (Note: The Stellick Affidavit describes Returning to Spirit as "a program affiliated with the Catholic Church, focused on reconciliation and spiritual healing for aboriginal persons affected by the residential schools." Stellick gives a figure of $2,656,000 in para. 52, citing an email attached as Exhibit "O". The email gives a figure of $2,556,000.) Those payments sum to $18,680,340.

The Catholic entities also said they paid $1,618,809 outside CCEPIRSS for "programs under schedule B". In its May 2014 factum, the government alleged that these payments were "only reported to Canada in April 2014", and that CCEPIRSS and its auditor had improperly reported the payments as having been made by CCEPIRSS. (The government's position was not tested in court because the parties entered into settlement negotiations.)

Adding $1,618,809 to $18,680,340 would give $20,299,149, which is $356,276 less than the Net Amount of $20,655,425.

=== In-kind services obligation ===
The Court noted that Canada's affiant Stellick had deposed that, while there had been some "disagreement over what would be included" with respect to the in-kind services, that had been "resolved", and the government was not disputing that the "in-kind obligation had been met". In 2016, The Globe and Mail described the in-kind services obligation as having been met. On November 19, 2018, Marc Miller, speaking on behalf of Crown-Indigenous Relations and Northern Affairs Canada, told Parliament that "it is our understanding that the Catholic entities have provided more than the $25 million in in-kind services ordered under section 3.5 of Schedule O-3 of the Settlement Agreement..."

In September 2021, The Globe and Mail obtained the in-kind services log from the Department of Justice through an Access to Information request. The Globe reported that former AANDC executive Aideen Nabigon (Note: The Globe and Mail describes Nabigon as a "former director general of policy and partnerships for the Indian Residential Schools Settlement Agreement". The Aboriginal Healing Foundation gave her title as "Director General of Settlement Agreement Policy and Partnerships at Aboriginal Affairs and Northern Development Canada". She was also on the board of directors of the AHF.) had reviewed the log and, in her opinion, many of the entries "look[ed] like charity work the church would have been performing anyway, rather than efforts directly tied to reconciliation." In October 2021, CBC News reported that Mary Ellen Turpel-Lafond believed that the vast majority of the in-kind services in the log were "not legitimate". She claimed to have found "ordinary church religious work repackaged as in-kind services and reconciliation."

In January 2022, the CCCB stated that the in-kind services obligation had been "fully met and exceeded" as of September 2011. They wrote: "These services were overseen and approved by a multi-party panel with appointments from the Assembly of First Nations, Catholic entities, and the Government of Canada. At the time each of these projects was deemed "valuable" by a First Nation band council, Métis Settlement, Friendship Centre, or other similar Indigenous body prior to approval by the multi-party panel." (Note: Section 3.6 of Schedule O-3 to the IRSSA stated: "The determination of qualifying In-Kind Services shall be made in accordance with Schedule B." Schedule B established the "Catholic Healing, Reconciliation and Service Evaluation Committee", which was to be "composed of seven members of which three members will be appointed by Catholic Entities; three members will be appointed by the AFN; and one member shall be appointed by Indian Residential Schools Resolution, Canada.")

=== Government's silence on reason for dropping appeal ===
For years after the government's decision to drop its appeal of the judgment became public knowledge, the government's reason for making that choice remained a mystery. Condemnation of the government's decision flourished, as did speculation about what an appeal might have achieved. The Liberal government emphasized that the previous Conservative government was responsible for the decision, but did not explain why the decision was made.

On April 20, 2016, The Globe and Mail published an article with the headline "Liberal government killed appeal of residential-school settlement ruling"; the word "Liberal" was subsequently replaced with "Federal". On April 21, NDP leader Tom Mulcair asked Minister of Indigenous and Northern Affairs Carolyn Bennett to explain "why the Liberals let the church off the hook". In response, Bennett said that "the headline of the story was wrong", and had been corrected; she pointed out that the release agreement "was signed October 30, five days before the new government took office."

In its article, the Globe sought comment from multiple lawyers. University of Alberta law professor Eric Adams, who had "no involvement in the case", was "surprised Canada didn't appeal it, because Mr. Gay had indicated throughout his discussions with Mr. Kuski that there were details to be worked out and approvals to be sought before the deal was finalized." He said: "Part of the calculus in deciding whether to appeal something is the stakes – and the stakes were huge". Ken Young, "a Winnipeg lawyer who spent 10 years in a residential school", believed that no agreement had been reached with respect to the fundraising obligation and that the government should have appealed. Kirk Baert, a lawyer who had "represented residential school survivors at settlement talks", told the Globe: "I don't get the logic of withdrawing [the appeal]. They're already at zero in terms of what the Catholics have to do. If you win, you may restore these benefits."

In an April 21 Question Period note addressing the Globe's article, Department of Justice Assistant General Counsel Duaine Simms provided a "proposed response" stating that the judge had "agreed with the Church" in the court dispute, and that Canada concluded an appeal would have "little prospect of success." Simms also prepared a longer memorandum for Minister of Justice Jody Wilson-Raybould. With respect to the appeal, he wrote: "[Beginning of sentence redacted] client, was that there would be a low likelihood of success of an appeal from factual findings and conclusions, and even if successful, an even lower chance of success in finding legal levers to force the Catholics to relaunch a moribund fundraising campaign." He also wrote that the "seven-year period" for the fundraising obligation had "ended in September 2014".

In October 2021, the Globe and CBC News obtained court records related to the 2015 decision that had not previously been made public; the reason for dropping the appeal remained undisclosed. Mary Ellen Turpel-Lafond told the Globe that the Attorney General of Canada should revisit the case. She alleged that the Catholic entities had used aggressive legal maneuvers to shed their obligations: "This was largely legal trickery and not a substantive consideration of the obligations and whether they were met." Speaking about the court decision, she said, "I think [Justice Gabrielson] was wrong, and that it was a disgrace." Later that month, NDP MP Charlie Angus wrote to the Prime Minister to ask who was responsible for dropping the appeal. He stated that he had "previously written to Minister Carolyn Bennett to understand why such an egregious abuse of justice was allowed" and had "received an inadequate response."

In November 2021, The Canadian Press reported that newly appointed Minister of Crown–Indigenous Relations Marc Miller had said he was "dumbfounded" that the appeal had been dropped and that he wanted to read the release agreement and "get to the bottom of it". A December 6, 2021 article reported that he had attributed the decision to the Harper government, saying there was no evidence the incoming Liberal cabinet was told about it. "Given the relatively small amount of money in question, and considering the possibility that the matter wasn't seen as political, [Miller] said, 'I can see how it happened.'" He went on to say: "It shouldn't have happened. And so you get into a situation where you want to ascribe blame [and] I don't want to be in that position... It represents a moral failure for both sides. That includes the Catholic Church's decision to limit its compensation but also on behalf of Canada — we should have appealed."

On December 19, 2021, CBC News described the appeal as having been abandoned "for some unknown reason". Crown–Indigenous Relations and Northern Affairs Canada officials had told CBC News that former Deputy Minister Colleen Swords had made the decision, but in an interview, Swords denied it, saying she wasn't sure why the appeal was dropped during the transition period after the October 2015 election. (Swords signed the General Final Release of October 30, 2015.) On December 21, CBC News reported that Miller had "said [he was] 'absolutely open' to the prospect of an independent review of the residential school compensation agreement between the Catholic Church entities and the federal government." He told CBC that Minister Bernard Valcourt had made the decision to drop the appeal, but a document proving this could not be shared due to cabinet confidence. He commented, "There may have been some — I'm only speculating — political motivation for it at the time. I'll be working with my team to see if we can declassify it..."

On April 7, 2022, the Globe reported that it had obtained Simms' April 21, 2016 memo through an Access to Information request, revealing that the appeal had been considered unlikely to succeed or to force a new fundraising campaign. The Globe noted that Indigenous leaders had been seeking answers over the reason for the dropped appeal for almost seven years. Turpel-Lafond told the Globe that the explanation in the memo was "really challenging to accept"; she called for "a public, independent review, commissioned by the Attorney-General of Canada, of the government's decision-making in the case." Asked about the idea of a review, Miller said he would "have to think about it in a little more detail": "'We have to ask ourselves what that review would ultimately yield,' he said, given the fundraising announcements by the Catholic Church last year."
