= Archdiocese of Grouard–McLennan =

Catholic ecclesiastical territory

Coordinates: 55°42′42″N 116°54′34″W

Archdiocese of Grouard–McLennan Archidioecesis Gruardensis–McLennanpolitana
- Coat of arms

Location
- Country: Canada
- Territory: Northwestern part of the Province of Alberta
- Ecclesiastical province: Grouard-McLennan

Statistics
- Area: 223,596 km^{2} (86,331 sq mi)
- Population: Total; Catholics: 112,986; 47,899 (42.4%)

Information
- Denomination: Catholic
- Sui iuris church: Latin Church
- Rite: Roman Rite
- Established: April 8, 1862
- Cathedral: Cathedral of Saint John the Baptist
- Patron saint: Saint Martin of Tours

Current leadership
- Pope: Leo XIV
- Archbishop: Charles Duval; Archbishop of Grouard-McLennan

Map

Website
- archgm.ca

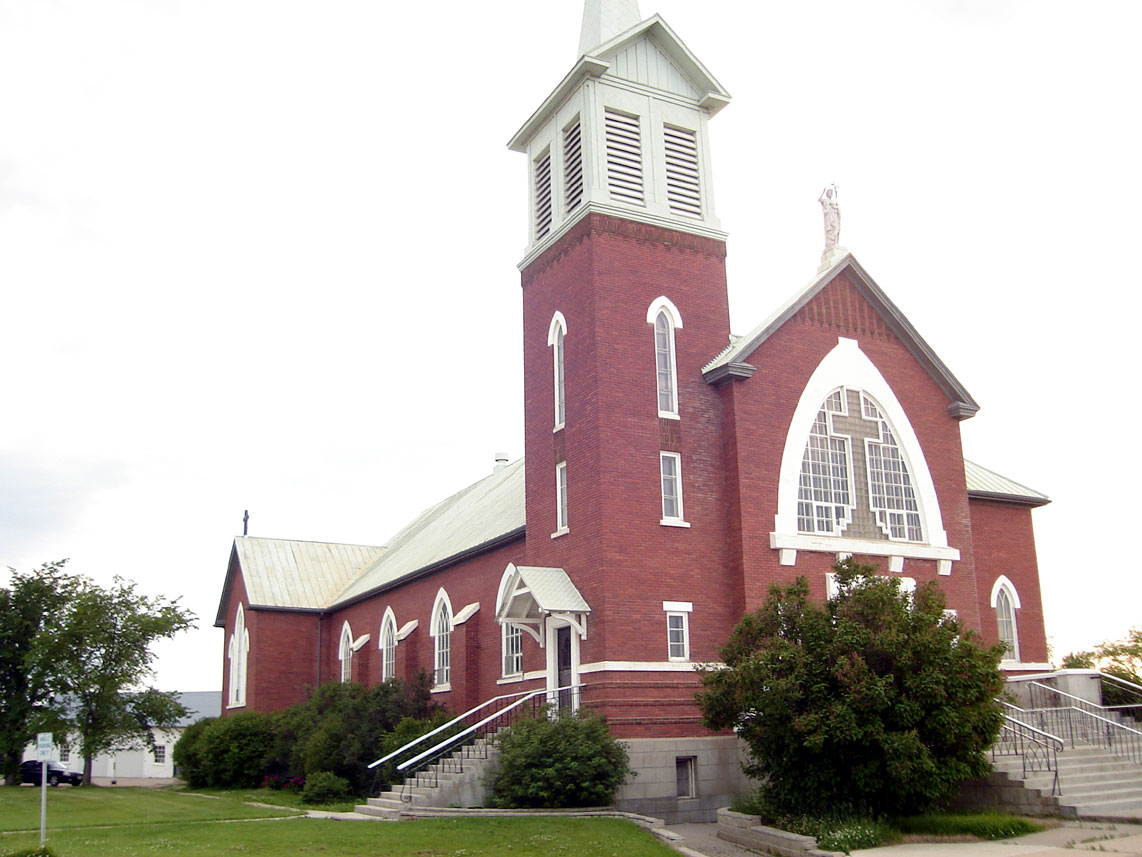
Cathedral of Saint John the Baptist in McLennan, Alberta

The Archdiocese of Grouard–McLennan (Latin: Archidioecesis Gruardensis–McLennanpolitana) is a Latin archdiocese of the Catholic Church in Canada and the metropolitan see of an ecclesiastical province for the Roman Catholic Church in northwestern Canada.

The archbishop is Charles Duval. As archbishop, Duval also serves as pastor of the Cathedral of St. John the Baptist, the mother church and episcopal see of the archdiocese.

== Ecclesiastical province ==
The Metropolitan has two suffragans :

- Roman Catholic Diocese of Mackenzie-Fort Smith
- Roman Catholic Diocese of Whitehorse.

== History ==
The Archdiocese of Grouard–McLennan was erected on April 8, 1862, as the Apostolic Vicariate of Athabaska Mackenzie, on territory split off from the Diocese of Saint-Boniface. A month later on May 8, 1862, Henri Faraud was appointed as apostolic vicar. Faraud served until March 20, 1890, when he resigned. He was succeeded by Émile Grouard who was appointed apostolic vicar on October 18, 1890. Faraud and later Grouard were assisted by Isidore Clut who was appointed auxiliary bishop on August 3, 1864, and who served until his death on July 9, 1903.

On July 3, 1901, the territory of the vicariate was split, remaining as the Apostolic Vicariate of Athabaska, which comprised what is today the northwestern area of the Province of Alberta, but losing the then Apostolic Vicariate of Mackenzie, which comprised what today is the Northwest Territories as well as northeastern area of the Province of Alberta. Grouard remained as the Apostolic Vicar of Athabaska and Gabriel Breynat was appointed Apostolic Vicar of Mackenzie. A few years after the death of Bishop Clut, Celestin_Henri Joussard was appointed coadjutor apostolic vicar on May 11, 1909.

On March 15, 1927, the name of the vicariate was changed from the Apostolic Vicariate of Athabaska to the Apostolic Vicariate of Grouard. Joussard never ended up succeeding Grouard as Apostolic Vicar of Athabaska and both Grouard and Joussard retired on April 18, 1929. Following the retirement of Grouard, Joseph Guy was appointed Vicar Apostolic of Grouard on December 19, 1929. Guy served until June 2, 1937, when he was appointed the Bishop of Gravelbourg.

The following year on March 30, 1938, Ubald Langlois was appointed Apostolic Vicar of Grouard. On June 15, 1945, Henri Routhier was appointed coadjutor apostolic vicar. In 1946 Langlois transferred the seat of the vicariate from Grouard to McLennan. The town of Grouard, taking its name from Bishop Grouard when it was incorporated as a town on September 27, 1909, was a thriving community of approximately 1,200 people. This changed when the Edmonton, Dunvegan and British Columbia Railway built its new line south of Lesser Slave Lake instead of going through Grouard which was on the north shore of Lesser Slave Lake. The majority of Grouard's population moved to High Prairie, the newly established town on the railway. Bishop Grouard had originally established a mission at the Lesser Slave Lake settlement, the original name of Grouard, under the patronage of Saint Bernard, in 1872.

Shortly after the seat of the vicariate was transferred to McLennan, work began on a new cathedral dedicated to Saint John the Baptist. Langlois served as Apostolic Vicar of Grouard until his death on September 18, 1953. Upon Langlois death, Bishop Routhier immediately succeeded him as Apostolic Vicar of Grouard. On July 13, 1967, the Apostolic Vicariate of Grouard was elevated to the Archdiocese of Grouard–McLennan and made the Metropolitan See of northwestern Canada with the newly elevated Dioceses of Prince George, Mackenzie-Fort Smith and Whitehorse as suffragans, but the Diocese of Prince George was later transferred to the Ecclesiastical Province of British Columbia. On this date all the Apostolic Vicariates in northern Canada were elevated to dioceses.

Routhier served until his resignation on November 21, 1972, he was succeeded by Henri Légaré, who had been Bishop of Labrador-Schefferville. Archbishop Légaré served until his retirement on July 16, 1996. On the same day Henri Goudreault, who had also served as Bishop of Labrador City-Schefferville, was appointed to succeed him. Archbishop Goudreault died suddenly of a heart attack on July 23, 1998. The Archdiocese of Grouard–McLennan remained vacant until the appointment of Arthé Guimond, who had served as archdiocesan administrator, on June 9, 2000. Archbishop Guimond retired on November 30, 2006, and Gérard Pettipas was appointed to succeed him on the same day.

== Bishops ==
=== Episcopal ordinaries ===
(all Roman Rite, mostly members of Latin congregations)

Apostolic Vicars of Athabaska Mackenzie

- Henri Faraud (8 May 1862 – death 20 March 1890), Titular Bishop of Anemurium (1863.05.16 – 1890.09.26)
  - Auxiliary Bishop Isidore Clut (1864.08.03 – death 1903.07.09), Titular Bishop of Arindela (1864.08.03 – 1903.07.09)
- Émile Grouard (18 October 1890 – 3 July 1901 see below), Titular Bishop of Ibora (18 October 1890 – 28 February 1930).

Apostolic Vicar of Athabaska

- Émile Grouard (see above 3 July 1901 – 15 March 1927 see below)
  - Coadjutor Vicar Apostolic Célestin-Henri Joussard (1909.05.11 – retired 1929.04.18), Titular Bishop of Arcadiopolis (1909.05.11 – death 1932.09.20).

Apostolic Vicars of Grouard

- Émile Grouard (see above 15 March 1927 – retired 18 April 1929), emeritate as Titular Archbishop of Ægina (1930.02.28 – death 1931.03.07)
- Joseph Guy (19 December 1929 – 2 June 1937), Titular Bishop of Photice (1929.12.19 – 1937.06.02); later Bishop of Gravelbourg (1937.06.02 – retired 1942.11.07), emeritate again as Titular Bishop of Photice (1942.11.07 – death 1951.12.08)
- Ubald Langlois (30 March 1938 – death 18 September 1953), Titular Bishop of Risinium (1938.03.30 – 1953.09.18)
- Henri Routhier (18 September 1953 – see elevated 13 July 1967 see below), succeeding as previous Coadjutor Vicar Apostolic of Grouard (1945.06.15 – 1953.09.18) and Titular Bishop of Naissus (1945.06.15 – 1967.07.13).

Metropolitan archbishops of Grouard–McLennan :

- Henri Routhier (see above 13 July 1967 – retired 21 November 1972), died 1989
- Henri Légaré (21 November 1972 – retired 16 July 1996), also President of Canadian Conference of Catholic Bishops (1981 – 1983); previously Bishop of Labrador–Schefferville (Canada) (1967.07.13 – 1972.11.21); died 2004
- Henri Goudreault (16 July 1996 – death 23 July 1998), previously Bishop of Labrador–Schefferville (Canada) (1987.04.27 – 1996.07.16)
- Arthé Guimond (9 June 2000 – retired 30 November 2006), died 2013
- Gérard Pettipas (30 November 2006 – 6 September 2025), retired
- Charles Duval (6 September 2025 – ...).

=== Coadjutor bishops ===
- Célestin-Henri Joussard (1909-1929), as Coadjutor Vicar Apostolic; did not succeed to see
- Henri Routhier (1945-1953), as Coadjutor Vicar Apostolic
- Charles Duval (Feb 2025-Sep 2025)

=== Auxiliary bishop ===
- Isidore Clut (1864-1890)

== Extent and statistics ==
Its ecclesiastic territory includes the northwest section of the Province of Alberta, the boundaries of which are, on the north the 60th parallel north, separating it from the Northwest Territories and the Diocese of Mackenzie-Fort Smith. To the south the 55th parallel north, separating it from the Diocese of Saint Paul. On the east the 113th meridian west, separating it from the Diocese of Saint Paul (to the 58th parallel north) and the Diocese of Mackenzie-Fort Smith (to the 60th parallel north). To the west the 120th meridian west, separating it from the Province of British Columbia, and the Diocese of Prince George.

As per 2014, the archdiocese pastorally served 59,927 Catholics (37.7% of 159,081 total) on 224,596 km^{2} in 33 parishes with 26 priests (17 diocesan, 9 religious), 2 deacons, 20 lay religious (9 brothers, 11 sisters) and 3 seminarians.

The archdiocese is organized into five Deaneries: Deanery 1 (centered on McLennan and predominantly French-speaking), Deanery 2 (centered on Peace River), Deanery 3 (centered on Grande Prairie), Deanery 4 (centered around Grouard and Slave Lake and predominantly Cree and Metis) and Deanery 5 (containing the farthest-north communities of Alberta)

== See also ==
- Robert Jacobson

== Sources and external links ==
- Archdiocese of Grouard–McLennan
- GCatholic with Google map and - satellite photo
