= Bonami =

Bonami is a French surname meaning "good friend". Notable people with the surname include:

- Alexis Bonami (1796–1890), Canadian voyageur and boat brigade leader
- Aline Bonami, French mathematician
- Francesco Bonami (born 1955), Italian art curator and writer
