= Cathedral of St. John the Baptist (McLennan) =

Catholic cathedral in Alberta, Canada

- Cathédrale Saint-Jean-Baptiste
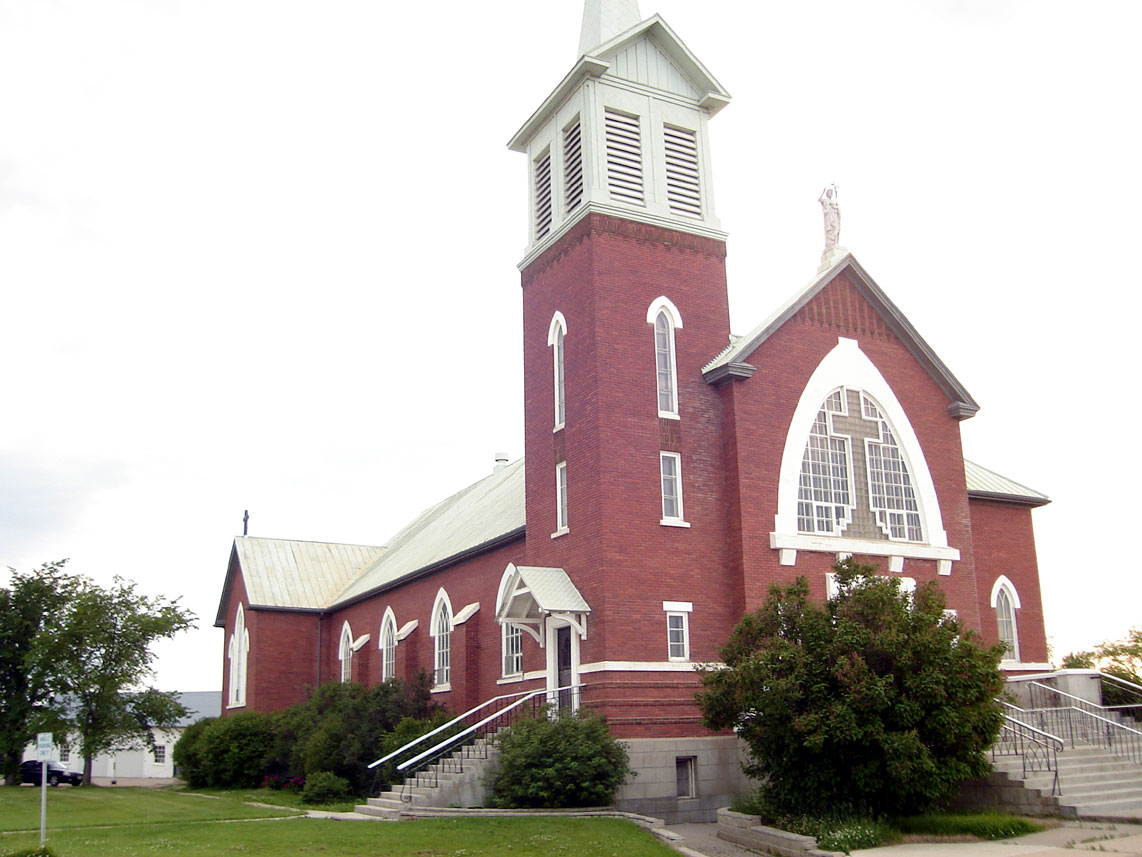
- St. John the Baptist Cathedral
- Cathedral of St. John the Baptist
- 55.7110416°N 116.9090204°W
- Location: McLennan, Alberta
- Country: Canada
- Denomination: Catholic Church
- Sui iuris church: Latin Church

Clergy
- Archbishop: Gérard Pettipas
- Pastor: Eucharius C. Ndzefemiti

The Cathedral of St. John the Baptist, also referred to as Saint-Jean-Baptiste Cathedral, (French: Cathédrale Saint-Jean-Baptiste) is a Catholic cathedral located in the town of McLennan in northwestern Alberta, Canada.

The cathedral is the seat of the Archdiocese of Grouard–McLennan which was created in 1862 as an apostolic vicariate and was elevated to an archdiocese in 1967 by the bull "Adsiduo perducti" of Pope Paul VI.

The current building was completed in 1947, the year in which it obtained its current status. The current Archbishop is Gérard Pettipas.

== See also ==
- List of cathedrals in Canada
