= Émile Grouard =

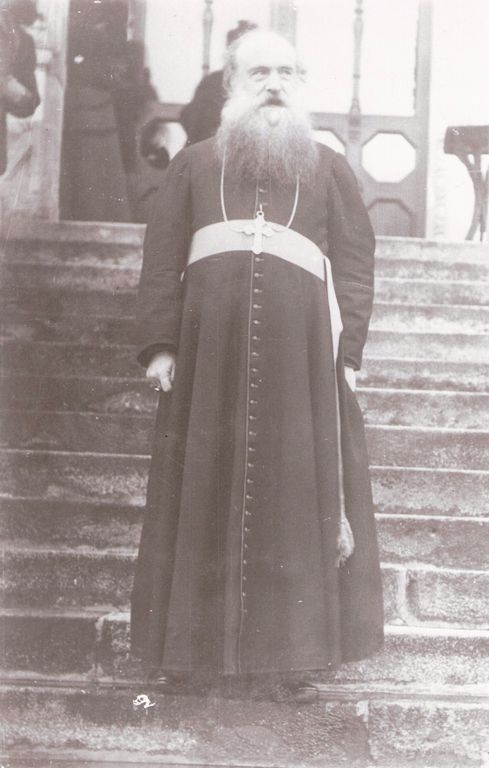
- Bishop Émile Grouard
- Born: Émile Jean-Baptiste Marie Grouard; February 2, 1840; Brulon, France
- Died: March 7, 1931 (aged 91); Grouard, Alberta
- Education: Laval University, Quebec
- Occupation: Priest

Émile Jean-Baptiste Marie Grouard O.M.I., "one of the most influential clerics in northern Alberta," was Apostolic Vicar of Athabasca. A gifted linguist, Grouard learned a number of languages of the indigenous peoples.

== Life ==
Grouard was born at Brulon, in Brittany, France February 1, 1840, the son of André and Anne Ménard Grouard; his father was a gendarme. Vital-Justin Grandin O.M.I. was his cousin.

He began seminary training at Le Mans, before emigrating in 1860 to Canada, where he completed his theological studies at the Séminaire de Québec. In May 1862, he was ordained by Alexandre-Antonin Taché, Bishop of the Diocese of Saint Boniface in Manitoba.

=== First journey North ===
In June 1862, newly ordained Father Grouard then 22 years old, was in Fort Garry with Father Émile Petitot, both having travelled there from Montreal with Bishop Taché, and fellow Oblates, Constantine Scollen and John Duffy.The two then travelled north with the Portage La Loche Brigade. He described his experience in his book "Souvenirs de mes soixante ans d'apostolat dans l'Athabaska-Mackenzie" (Memories of my sixty years of ministry in the Athabaska-Mackenzie)

"Monsignor Taché had made arrangements for our passage, Father Petitot and I, with the Hudson's Bay Company on the boats leaving that afternoon of Pentecost for Portage La Loche. On the morning of this great feast day, we received our religious habit from the Monsignor and I began my novitiate that I would spend at Lake Athabasca under the direction of Father Clut. During the journey my superior would be Father Petitot. The rule would be loosely followed. On the afternoon of the Pentecost, a brigade of eight York boats would leave Fort Garry and one would have Father Petitot and I as passengers. We each had our travel case, and Monsignor Taché had supplied for our voyage: thick wool blankets wrapped in oilskin, a tent, a stove, a tea kettle, plates and iron pans, knives and forks, a bag of dried meat, a large sack of pemmican, a barrel of biscuits, some ham, tea, sugar. We were to live on this for two months. Monsignor had also arranged for a Métis to do our cooking and to help us set up our tent every night and take it down every morning. He suggested that we be quick to obey the guide's signal: "Lève ! Lève!" in the morning and not to delay getting into the boat. He led us to the river's edge, gave us his benediction, embraced us tenderly like a father would and we took our place on the boat." (translation)

Grouard began his novitiate with the Missionary Oblates of Mary Immaculate at Saint Boniface, and made his final profession the following year. He grew a beard in order to appear older. Grouard had a talent for languages, and learned Cree, Chipewyan and Beaver. In 1863, he preached his first sermon in Chipewyan. He would later print the Bible in the Chipewyan language.

He served as a missionary in such places as Fort Chipewyan, Fort Providence, Lac La Biche and Dunvegan. In 1870, during a stay at Fort Simpson, he decorated the small chapel and made an oil-painting of the Crucifixion. He returned to France for medical treatment, and while there took lessons in drawing and painting from the Christian Brothers in Paris. Upon his return, he decorated a side chapel in the church at St. Albert, and an altarpiece for Notre Dame des Victoires at Lac Ia Biche.

He published several books in the Cree, Chipewyan and Beaver languages with a Stanhope printing press he acquired on a trip to France in 1874. In 1877 he and Bishop Faraud printed in syllabic type the first book published in Alberta.

=== Bishop ===
He was appointed the vicar apostolic of Athabasca-Mackenzie and titular bishop of Ibora in 1890 and in 1891 he was ordained bishop of the new diocese of Athabasca.

In order to improve the supply of provisions, he had steamboats built to travel on the Peace, Mackenzie, Slave and Athabasca Rivers. The boats were constructed and operated by the Oblate brothers. The mission at Dunvegan ran the first sternwheeler, the St. Charles, in 1902. Built for Bishop Grouard, her primary purpose was to aid him in his missionary work. She also carried goods for the North-West Mounted Police and the HBC.

During the negotiations of Treaty 8 in 1899 he advised the First Nations of Lesser Slave Lake.

In 1924, the French government made him a chevalier of the Legion of Honour. He died in Grouard, Alberta on March 7, 1931.

== See also ==
- Roman Catholic Archdiocese of Grouard–McLennan
- Apostolic Vicariate of Athabasca
- Dunvegan Provincial Park
- Western Canadian steamships of the Oblate Order of Mary Immaculate
