= Isidore Clut =

Catholic bishop (1832–1903)

- Auxiliary Bishop of Athabaska Mackenzie, Alberta
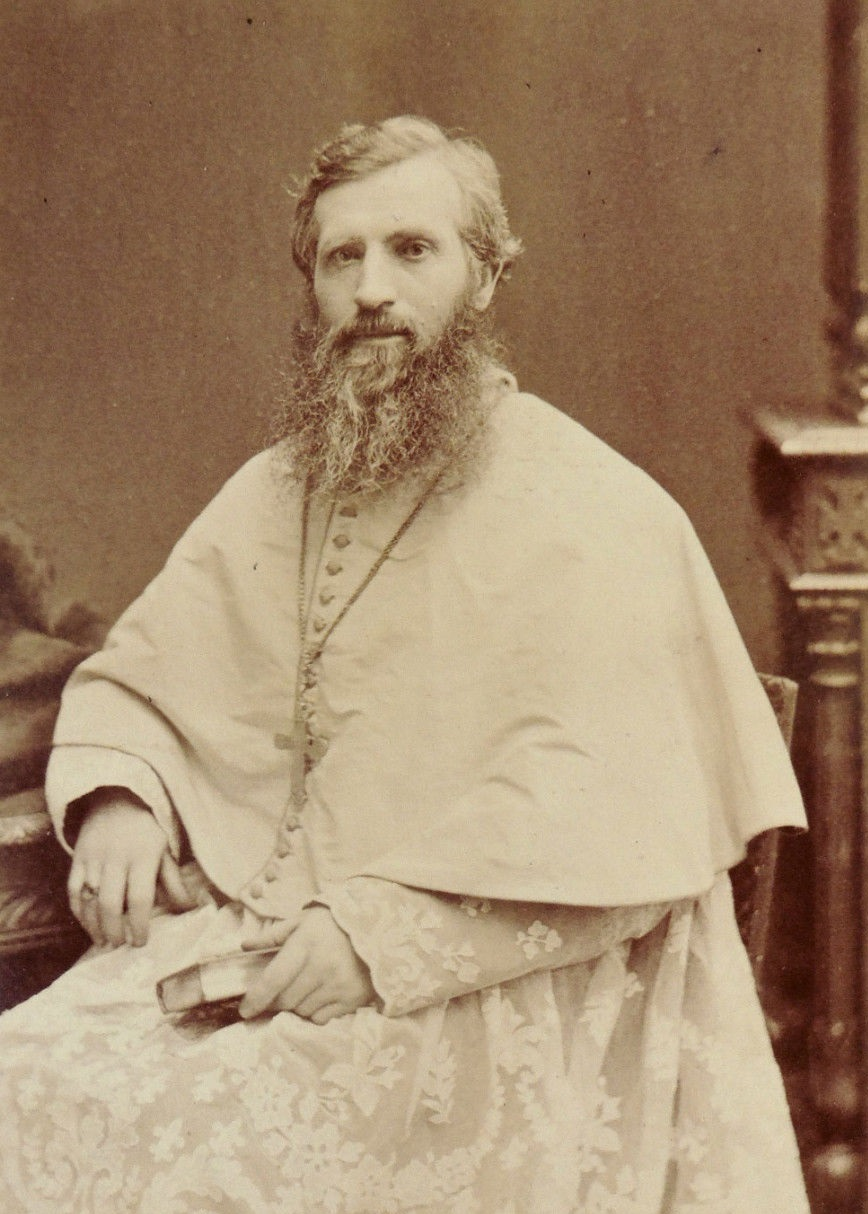
- Isidore Clut
- Diocese: Athabaska Mackenzie
- Installed: August 3, 1864
- Term ended: July 9, 1903
- Predecessor: N/A

Orders
- Ordination: December 20, 1857

Personal details
- Born: February 11, 1832 Saint-Rambert-d'Albon, France
- Died: July 9, 1903 (aged 71) Saint-Bernard mission (Grouard Mission, Alberta)

Isidore Clut (February 11, 1832 – July 9, 1903) was a Canadian Roman Catholic priest, Oblate of Mary Immaculate, and Auxiliary Bishop of Athabaska Mackenzie from 1864 to 1903.

== Life ==
Clut was born 4 February 4, 1832 in Saint-Rambert-d'Albon, France; his parents were farmers. He entered the Oblate novitiate at Notre-Dame-de-l'Osier in 1853 and studied theology at Montolivet in Marseilles, where he took his vows the following year.

In 1857 Clut went to Canada at the invitation of Bishop Alexandre-Antonin Taché of St Boniface, who ordained him that same year. Taché sent him to La Nativité mission at Fort Chipewyan, where he served there from 1858 to 1869. La Nativité was the episcopal see of Bishop Henri Faraud, apostolic vicar of the Vicariate of Athabasca-Mackenzie. Faraud had become expert in the Chipewyan language and a book he had compiled was a great help to Clut.

In 1864, Faraud, for whom traveling had become difficult due to rheumatic pain, received permission to name an auxiliary bishop, and chose Clut. Clut was assigned to Providence Mission in order to supervise the various mission stations, and spent a good deal of time traveling from one to another.

In 1876, the mission at Salt River was moved from to Fort Smith, since the latter was growing. Faraud named it "St. Isidore", after his auxiliary. Émile Grouard succeeded Faraud as Apostolic Vicar in 1890; Clut continued as auxiliary bishop under Grouard. He died on July 9, 1903, at St. Bernard Mission, Grouard, Alberta.
