= Apostolic Vicariate of Athabasca =

The Vicariate Apostolic of Athabasca (Latin: Vicariatus Apostolicus Athabascensis) was a suffragan of the Roman Catholic Archdiocese of Saint-Boniface in Canada.

The Vicariate Apostolic originated as the Vicariate Apostolic of Athabaska Mackenzie, which was established in 1862 during the papacy of Pius IX. It was located in the North-West Territories. The first vicar Apostolic was Bishop Henri Faraud. He was succeeded by Bishop Emile Grouard. The Oblates of Mary Immaculate were the predominant Order in the jurisdiction.

On July 3, 1901, the Vicariate Apostolic of Athabaska Mackenzie was split into the Vicariate Apostolic of Athabaska and the Vicariate Apostolic of Mackenzie. The former would later be renamed as the Vicariate Apostolic of Grouard on March 15, 1927.

On July 13, 1967, the Vicariate Apostolic was elevated to the Archdiocese of Grouard-McLennan.
