= Arthé Guimond =

Canadian Roman Catholic bishop

- Archbishop of Grouard–McLennan
- Church: Catholic Church
- Archdiocese: Archdiocese of Grouard–McLennan
- In office: 9 June 2000 – 30 November 2006
- Predecessor: Henri Goudreault
- Successor: Gérard Pettipas

Orders
- Ordination: 23 June 1957 by Henri Routhier
- Consecration: 15 August 2000 by Paolo Romeo

Personal details
- Born: May 22, 1931 Rimouski, Quebec, Dominion of Canada
- Died: February 6, 2013 (aged 81)

Arthé Guimond (May 22, 1931 – February 6, 2013) was the Roman Catholic bishop of the Diocese of Grouard-McLennan, Canada.

Ordained to the priesthood in 1957, Guimond was named bishop in 2000 and retired in 2006.
