= Portage La Loche Brigade =

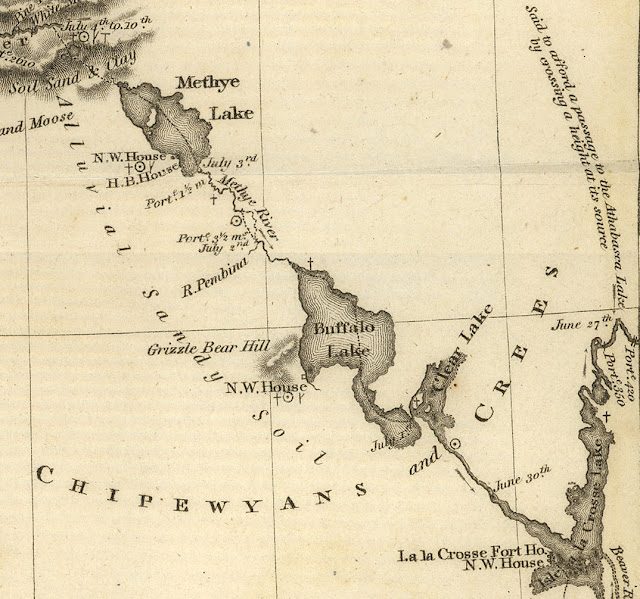
John Franklin's Coppermine Expedition map of 1819–1822 showing the fur trade route from Île-à-la-Crosse to Methye Portage

The La Loche Brigade route from Lake Winnipeg to Methye Portage

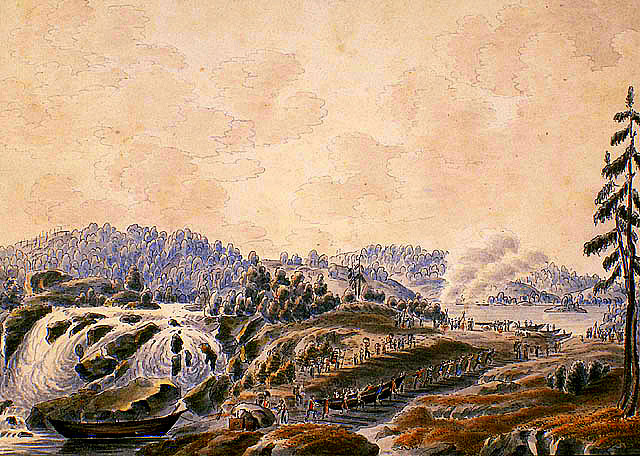
A brigade of York boats at a portage by Peter Rindisbacher in 1821

The Portage La Loche Brigade was a York boat fur brigade that travelled between Fort Garry, the Methye Portage and York Factory in Rupert's Land. This famous brigade travelled 4000 miles every year and was part of the Hudson's Bay Company transportation system during the North American fur trade. Their trip from Fort Garry to Portage La Loche (known also as Methye Portage) would begin around 1 June and end around 8 October. Only one other brigade had a longer route. The York Factory Express brigade travelled 4200 miles from York Factory to Fort Vancouver until 1846.

By the 1820s the Hudson's Bay company had several York boat brigades travelling distinct routes. Permanent trading posts had been built at strategic sites along the main brigade routes and as soon as the waterways were free of ice the fur brigades would carry trade goods and food supplies to replenish the various trading posts along their route and pick up the accumulation of furs caught during the winter season. They also carried mail and passengers.

The boat brigades were mostly crewed by Métis as were almost all the men employed by the Hudson's Bay Company's Northern Department (now the Prairie Provinces and the North-West Territories). In 1862 Father Émile Petitot quoted William J. Christie then the chief factor of Fort Edmonton as saying in French; "We are almost all Métis in the Company. Among the chief factors there is not a single Englishman, and maybe not ten Scots with pure blood." (translation)

== History ==
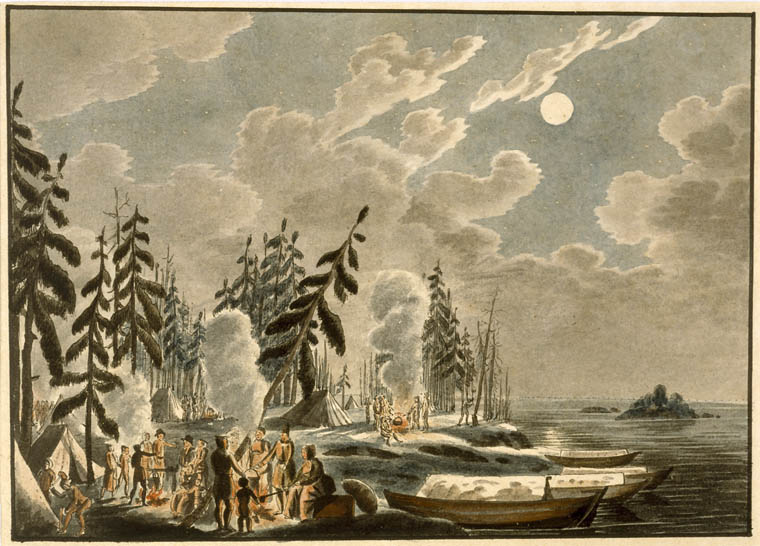
Brigade of York boats camping on Lake Winnipeg by Peter Rindisbacher in 1821 showing sails being used as boat coverings.

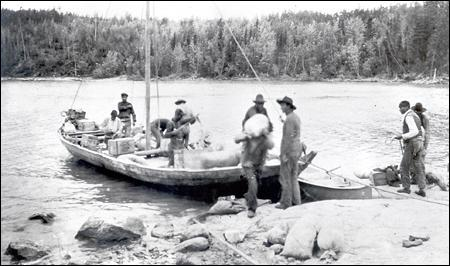
A York boat in use in 1910

Men from the Red River Settlement recruited by the Hudson's Bay Company formed the first Portage La Loche brigade of 1826. The brigade consisted of 7 York boats with Laurent Cadotte as guide. The guide in 1833 was Alexis L'Esperance (Alexis Bonami) who retired in 1866. In 1848 two Portage La Loche Brigades were formed. Each brigade had seven boats, each with a guide. One brigade was still guided by Alexis L'Esperance (Alexis Bonami dit Lesperance), the other by Jean Baptiste Bruce. In 1866 the HBC increased the Portage La Loche Brigades to three with seventeen boats in total. The last Portage La Loche Brigade arrived at Norway House in 1873.

=== Leaving Fort Garry ===
In his book En route pour la mer Glaciale Father Emile Petitot recounts his 1862 trip with the Portage La Loche Brigade. He left Fort Garry on 8 June as a passenger with the Lesperance brigade. The other brigade guided by Jean Baptiste Bruce had left a week earlier. He arrived at the Portage 42 days later on 20 July. In the following translation Petitot describes leaving Fort Garry.

"The distance from Fort Garry to Portage La Loche was 482 French leagues (1446 miles) which we would undertake in a small vessel called a York boat. York boats are flat bottomed, pointed at both ends and displace 8 to 9 tonnes, which give them a capacity of 4 to 5,000 kilos. The keel measures normally 30 to 36 feet. It is rowed or sailed and steered with a long ‘aviron’ called a sweep and a rudder. The York boat is crewed by nine to ten men, a helmsman called a 'gouvernail', a bossman or ‘devant de barge’, and eight rowers called the ‘milieux’. These milieux were also the porters. Our guide was an old French Canadian called Alexis Lesperance. At 80 years old his actions were slowed but not his voice. His boat, always the first, was guided by his son. A kind of guide, the Metis Michel Dumas, led our boat. Our cook and porter was another Metis called Baptiste Boucher, ‘mangeur de lard’ (greenhorn) like us who was forced to come out of need. Our brigade had seven boats, all crewed by French Metis with a few Swampy Cree and Chippewa Christians.

A great cry: “Aoh! Aoh!” Pousse au large!” came from the lungs of Lesperance, made me understand that the old guide, however white haired he may be, was nevertheless still green and full of energy. A savage cry: “Wi ! Wi !” uttered by the crews, answered this order, and the seven York boats took their leave on the ‘Miskwa-Kamaw Sipiy’. Twenty five years later I still seem to see the pitiful figures that Grouard and I made in our boat filled with sugar boxes, barrels of powder, bolts of cloth and cases of tobacco, with only a felt hat for shade, seated on the first piece of baggage we found."

At the Stone Fort, Petitot bought more provisions for his journey. His complete list of supplies included 125 kilos of flour, two bags of sea biscuits, 25 kilos of pemmican, 4 smoked and cooked hams, 6 large loaves of bread, a big bag of buffalo tongues and smoked meat, a small case of eggs, a little bag of onions, 3 pounds of Congo tea, a small barrel of maple syrup; some sugar, ground coffee, salt, pepper and butter. Two blankets rolled in an oil skin bag, a hatchet and a case of clothes completed his baggage.

Father Émile Grouard who was travelling with Petitot also described the experience in his book "Souvenirs de mes soixante ans d'apostolat dans l'Athabaska-Mackenzie"

"Monsignor Taché had made arrangements for our passage, Father Petitot and I, with the Hudson's Bay Company on the boats leaving that afternoon of Pentecost for Portage La Loche."

"We each had our travel case, and Monsignor Taché had supplied for our voyage: thick wool blankets wrapped in oilskin, a tent, a stove, a tea kettle, plates and iron pans, knives and forks, a bag of dried meat, a large sack of pemmican, a barrel of biscuits, some ham, tea, sugar. We were to live on this for two months. Monsignor had also arranged for a Métis to do our cooking and to help us set up our tent every night and take it down every morning. He suggested that we be quick to obey the guide's signal: "Lève ! Lève!" in the morning and not to delay getting into the boat. He led us to the river's edge, gave us his benediction, embraced us tenderly like a father would and we took our place on the boat." (translation)

The following are Joseph James Hargrave's estimates of the dates when the brigades arrived and left each section of the route. The dates are from his 1871 book, Red River, a history of the Red River Colony.

== Route ==
1 June	The brigade left Fort Garry in early June, went down the Red River, traveled the length of Lake Winnipeg and
10 June	arrived at Norway House. There they picked up supplies that had been stored there the year before from York Factory
12 June	They left Norway House crossed Lake Winnipeg and entered the Saskatchewan River system at Grand Rapids
24 June	They passed Cumberland House then entered the Churchill River System by crossing over the Frog Portage via the Sturgeon-Weir River.
9 July	They passed Ile a la Crosse
17 July	arrived at Portage La Loche unloaded and portaged supplies and loaded furs brought there by the Athabasca and Mackenzie brigades.
1 August	They left Portage La Loche (Methye Portage)
5 August	passed Ile a la Crosse
15 August	passed Cumberland House and
21 August	arrived at Norway House and continued on to York Factory by the Oxford House/ Hayes River Route.
31 August	They arrived at York Factory unloaded furs and reloaded supplies bound for Norway House and Fort Garry.
10 September	They left York Factory and returned to
30 September	Norway House where supplies were unloaded to be picked up again next year.
8 October	They arrived at Fort Garry with supplies and mail.

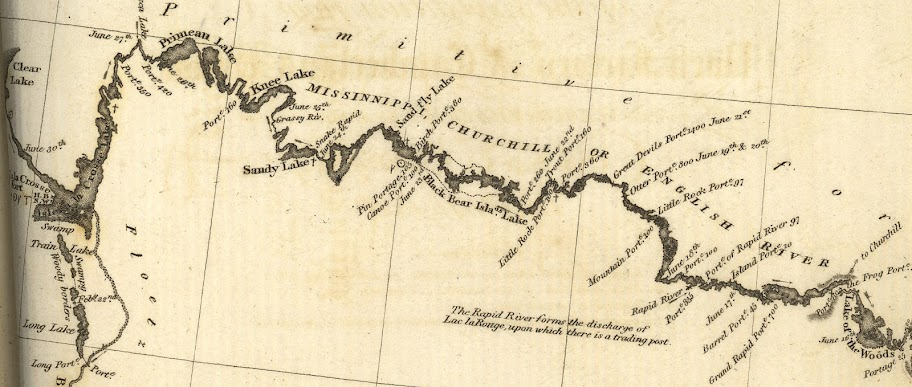
John Franklin's 1819-1822 expedition map detailing the Churchill River fur trade route from Frog Portage to Lac Île-à-la-Crosse
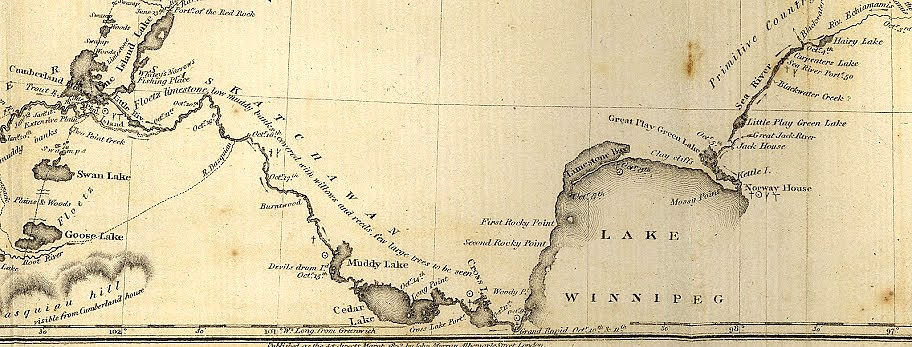
John Franklin's 1819-1822 expedition map detailing the Lake Winnipeg and Saskatchewan River portion of the fur trade route from Norway House to Grand Rapids to Cumberland House
