= Western Canadian steamships of the Oblate Order of Mary Immaculate =

In the late 19th Century the Oblate Order of Mary Immaculate operated a fleet of steamboats on rivers in the Canadian west. The order is an organization of Christian missionaries. They had established small missions to proselytize to Canada's First Nations people throughout the west. The Hudson's Bay Company was granted a Royal Charter to all the land that drained into Hudson's Bay Company in 1670 - a vast tract of land, known as Rupert's Land. They administered Rupert's Land until the 1860s, when it was transferred to the new country of Canada. The Canadian Pacific Railway had crossed Canada, and other railways had been constructed in the west, but many remote areas were only accessible by riverboat—riverboats operated by the Hudson's Bay Company

The Oblate Order with the local leadership of Bishop Grouard started constructing their own fleet of riverboats, one each for isolated stretches of river. The order included skilled carpenters, who constructed the riverboats, on-site, from local timber. The engines were shipped from eastern Canada.

Their fleet included:

St. Joseph	1893	Navigated the Athabasca River, the lower Peace River, and the upper Slave River.
St. Alphonse	1894	Navigated the Mackenzie River and the lower Slave River.
St. Emile	1902	Navigated Lesser Slave Lake.
St. Charles	1903	Navigated the upper Peace River.
