= Alexis Bonami =

Canadian fur trader

Alexis Bonami (dit L'Esperance (Lesperance))
- Born: 27 November 1796; Saint-Michel d'Yamaska Yamaska, Quebec
- Died: 11 December 1890; St. François Xavier, Manitoba.
- Occupation(s): voyageur, guide. brigade leader

Alexis Bonami (27 November 1796 – 11 December 1890) was a voyageur and boat brigade leader based at the Red River settlement. He achieved historical significance for his leadership of the Portage La Loche brigade. During the War of 1812 he served in a regiment commanded by Lieutenant-Colonel James Cuthbert.

== See also ==
- Methye Portage
