= St. Charles (ship) =

Canadian steamboat

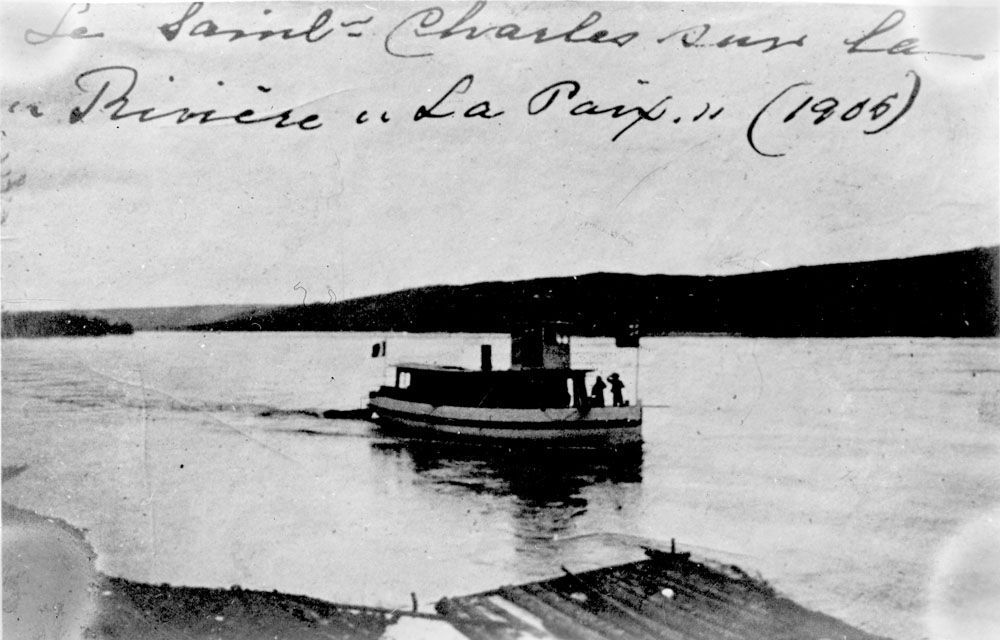
- St. Charles at Peace River Crossing 1906

History
- Name: St. Charles
- Owner: Brothers of the Oblate Order of Mary Immaculate (1903–1911); Ford and Lawrence (1911–)
- Launched: 1893
- Fate: Scrapped 1916–1917

General characteristics
- Type: Steamboat
- Tonnage: 28.9 (gross), 19.5 (registered)
- Length: 60 feet (18 m)
- Beam: 12 feet (3.7 m)

St. Charles was a small, screw-driven steamboat that serviced the upper Peace River, from 1903 to 1914. She was built from local timber for Brothers of the Oblate Order of Mary Immaculate, using engines and other fittings brought from Peterborough, Ontario.

She was the first steamboat on the upper Peace River. She was sold in 1911 to Ford and Lawrence. According to Edward L. Affleck, St. Charles was one of a "fleet of pint-sized vessels" the Order operated, so they would not have to rely on the Hudson's Bay Company's monopoly on river shipping.

The Peace River has two long navigable sections, from the mouth on Lake Athabasca to the Vermilion Chutes, and on the upper river, from Fort Vermilion to Hudson's Hope—a distance of 526 miles (847 km). St Charles was confined to the upper reaches.

== See also ==
- Western Canadian steamships of the Oblate Order of Mary Immaculate
