= Gérard Pettipas =

Canadian prelate

The Most Reverend Gérard Pettipas C.Ss.R.
- Archbishop of Grouard–McLennan
- Church: Roman Catholic Church
- Archdiocese: Grouard-McLennan
- See: Grouard-McLennan
- Appointed: 30 November 2006
- Term ended: 6 September 2025
- Predecessor: Arthé Guimond
- Successor: Charles Duval

Orders
- Ordination: 7 May 1977 by Thomas Benjamin Fulton
- Consecration: 25 January 2007 by Luigi Ventura

Personal details
- Born: Gérard Pettipas; 6 September 1950 (age 75); Halifax, Nova Scotia, Canada
- Motto: Voluntas Dei sanctificatio vestra
- Coat of arms

Gérard Pettipas, C.Ss.R. (born September 6, 1950) is a Canadian prelate of the Roman Catholic Church. He is a member of the Congregation of the Most Holy Redeemer (Redemptorists). He was archbishop of the Archdiocese of Grouard-McLennan from 2006 to 2025.

== Biography ==
Pettipas was born in Halifax, Nova Scotia. At the age of 26, he was ordained a priest on May 7, 1977, by Bishop Thomas Benjamin Fulton, who at the time was the Titular Bishop of Cursola.

At the age of 56, he was appointed as archbishop of Grouard-McLennan by Pope Benedict XVI on November 30, 2006. He received his episcopal consecration on January 25, 2007, by Archbishop Luigi Ventura, who at the time was the Apostolic Nuncio to Canada; Bishop Denis Croteau, O.M.I., Bishop Emeritus of the Diocese of MacKenzie-Fort Smith, North West Territories, Canada; and Bishop Gary Gordon, who at that time was Bishop of the Diocese of Whitehorse, Yukon, Canada.

Pettipas was the primary consecrator of Bishop Mark Andrew Hagemoen and Bishop Jon Hansen, C.Ss.R., both Bishops of the Diocese of MacKenzie-Fort Smith, North West Territories, Canada. And Pettipas was the co-consecrator of Bishop Héctor Felipe Vila, Bishop of the Diocese of Whitehorse, Yukon, Canada.
