= Apostolic Vicariate of Mackenzie =

Roman Catholic district in Canada (1901–1967)

The Vicariate Apostolic of Mackenzie (Latin: Vicariatus Apostolicus Mackenziensis) was formerly part of the Athabaska-Mackenzie Vicariate and became a separate entity in 1901. It encompassed the Yukon with the remainder of the territory being renamed the Vicariate Apostolic of Athabasca. It was elevated to the episcopal see of Mackenzie-Fort Smith in 1967.

== Diocesan bishops ==
- Gabriel-Joseph-Elie Breynat, O.M.I. (1901-1943), "The Bishop of the Winds", Titular Bishop of Adramyttium (1901) and Titular Archbishop of Garella (1939)
- Joseph-Maria Trocellier, O.M.I. (1943-1958)
- Paul Piché, O.M.I. (1959-1967)
