= St. Alphonse (1894 ship) =

Canadian steamship

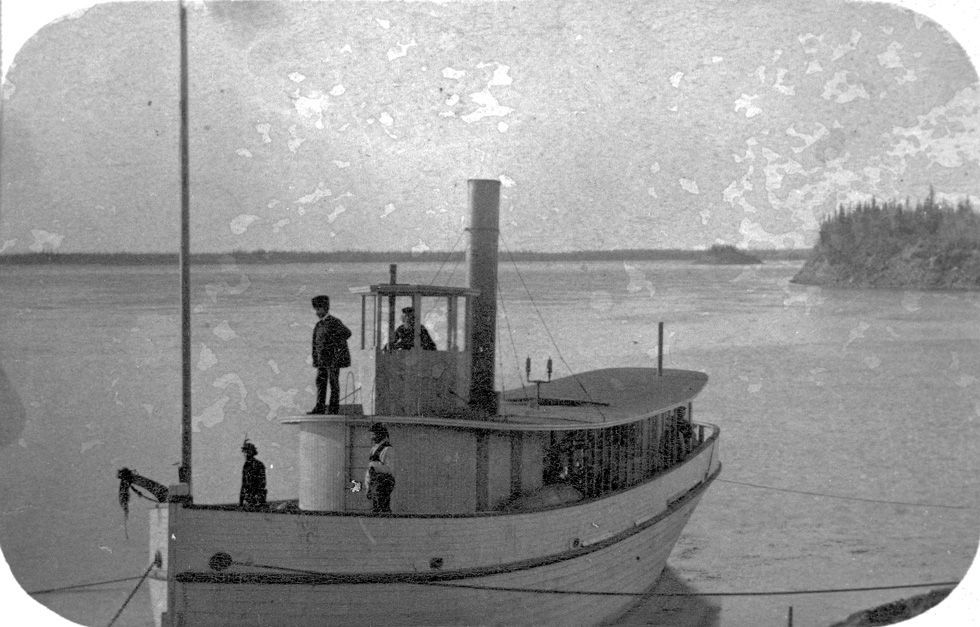
- The Oblate order operated the St. Alphonse on the Mackenzie River, Great Slave Lake and the lower Slave River

History
- Name: St. Alphonse
- Owner: Brothers of the Oblate Order of Mary Immaculate
- Launched: 1895

General characteristics
- Type: Steamboat
- Tonnage: 28.9 (gross), 19.5 (registered)
- Length: 60 feet (18 m)
- Beam: 12 feet (3.7 m)

The St. Alphonse was a small steamship operated by the Brothers of the Oblate Order of Mary Immaculate, in the Northwest Territories of Canada. The order built a small fleet of steamboats to transit the Mackenzie River and its tributaries. Although fastmoving, the Mackenzie River is navigable along its entire length. But the Order required multiple vessels because some of the major tributaries, like the Peace River, Slave River had rapids that were too fast, or too shallow for navigation.

The St. Alphonse traveled on the Mackenzie itself, Great Slave Lake, and the lower Slave River, to the portage near Fort Smith, Northwest Territories.
