= Henri Faraud =

Henri Faraud (17 June 1823 – 26 September 1890), a bishop of the Roman Catholic Church, was the first Vicar Apostolic of Athabasca-Mackenzie in western Canada.

== Life ==
He was born in Gigondas, France and studied at the minor seminary of Notre-Dame-de-Lumières in Goult. In 1844, he professed vows as an Oblate of Mary Immaculate. He continued his studies at Notre-Dame-de-l'Osier.

Faraud came to Canada in 1846 as a result of a search for missionaries for the northern missions by Bishop Joseph-Norbert Provencher. In 1847 he was ordained at Saint Boniface. He remained there to continue his theological studies and to learn the language and customs of the Ojibwe. He was ordained in May 1847.

Around 1848, Faraud replaced Louis-François Richer Laflèche at Île-à-la-Crosse, but moved farther northwest in 1849, and established the mission of La Nativité at Fort Chipewyan, where he made his base and constructed a church in 1851. He and Sister Default, of the "Grey nuns" painted the murals inside the church. Another mission was established at Lake Athabasca in September, 1851. He visited Great Slave Lake, where no missions had ever been, and ministered to the Indians of Peace River (1858-59).

Bishop Alexandre-Antonin Taché, who had succeeded Provencher in 1853, and in 1855 designated the relocated Lac La Biche Mission as supply base and point of departure for parts north. Taché, with the support of Archbishop Turgeon of Quebec, succeeded in having the Athabasca–Mackenzie district made a separate Apostolic vicariate with Faraud as bishop. On May 8, 1862, Faraud was made titular bishop of Anemour and apostolic vicar of the newly created Vicariate Athabasca-Mackenzie, although due to his remote location he did not know of it before July of the following year. He made the Mission de Notre-Dame-des-Victoires at Lac La Biche his episcopal see.

Bishop Faraud spent the next 25 years in the north, during which he evidenced considerable administrative abilities. He authored several works on his work in the Northwest. In 1835 he repaired to France, for the General Chapter of his Congregation. In 1866 Isidore Clut was appointed auxiliary bishop.

In 1889 he was one of the Fathers of the Provincial Council of St. Boniface, at the termination of which his growing infirmities prevented him from returning to his distant missions in the North. Persuaded to retire, he spent his remaining few months at Saint Boniface, where he died. He was laid to rest in the crypt of Saint Boniface Cathedral next to the remains of Bishop Provencher. By the time of his death, Faraud was recognized as the premier linguist among the Oblates of the Mackensie Basin, having command of Cree, Chipewyan, Beaver, Slave, Dog Rib, and some Inuit.

== Sources ==
- Drouin, E.O. (1982). "Faraud, Hwnri". In Halpenny, Francess G. (ed.). Dictionary of Canadian Biography. Vol. XI (1881–1890) (online ed.). University of Toronto Press.
