= Newman Theological College =

Catholic college in Alberta, Canada

- Other name: NTC
- Motto: Faith Seeking Understanding
- Established: 1969
- Religious affiliation: Roman Catholic
- Academic affiliations: St. Joseph Seminary
- President: Darren E. Dahl
- Location: Edmonton, Alberta, Canada; 53.5387°N 113.4579°W
- Colours: Blue; yellow
- Website: www.newman.edu

Newman Theological College (NTC) is a Roman Catholic school of theology founded in 1969 by the Roman Catholic Archdiocese of Edmonton in Alberta, Canada.

== Founding ==
NTC was founded in 1969 in the wake of the Second Vatican Council. NTC grew out of the existing structure of St. Joseph Seminary which had already opened its doors in 1967. NTC is a private, Catholic academic institution dedicated to the study of theology and related disciplines by people who do not intend to become priests, or who have already graduated from a seminary. Its charter to confer degrees was originally granted by the Legislative Assembly of Alberta on April 29, 1969. NTC has been an accredited member of the Association of Theological Schools in the United States and Canada since 1992.

NTC carries out its mission for the Church in an ongoing partnership with St. Joseph Seminary, whose particular mission is the human, spiritual and pastoral formation of future diocesan priests. Both institutions remain distinct, interdependent, and complementary. Lay men and women, diocesan clergy from western Canada, along with several religious orders of men and consecrated women work together to fulfill the mission of NTC.

== John Henry Newman ==
John Henry Newman (21 February 1801 – 11 August 1890) was an English theologian and poet, first an Anglican priest and later a Catholic priest and cardinal, who was an important and controversial figure in the religious history of England in the 19th century. He was known nationally by the mid-1830s, and was canonised as a saint in the Catholic Church in 2019.

== Accreditation ==
- NTC is considered a non-affiliated private college within the post-secondary educational system of Alberta. It has been empowered to confer academic degrees, diplomas and certificates in the field of religious sciences. The charter was granted on April 29, 1969, during the second session of the 16th Legislature (Private Bill #4).
- In 1972, NTC became an associate member of the ATS in the United States and Canada. In 1988, NTC was granted the status of candidacy in view of a self-study and ATS visitation. Initial accreditation as a member of ATS was granted in January 1992. Accreditation was extended in 1996, and again in 2007, 2016, and 2023 with approval of the following degrees:
  - Master of Divinity
  - Master of Religious Education
  - Master of Theological Studies and Master of Theology [discontinued in 2025]
- In 2020, NTC launched a Bachelor of Arts in Catholic Studies, approved by Alberta's Minister of Advanced Education

== Presidents ==
- Rev. Oswald Fuchs, OFM 1969 – 1970
- Rev. Michael O’ Callaghan 1970 – 1973 and 1975 – 1976
- Rev. Dr. Don MacDonald, OFM 1973 – 1975, 1976 – 1978 and 1991 – 1993
- Rev. Michael McCaffery 1978 – 1983
- Rev. Wilfred Murchland 1983 – 1990
- Most Rev. Gerald Wiesner, OMI 1992
- Kevin Carr 1993 – 2001
- Dr. Christophe Poworowski 2001 – 2003
- Rev. Jack Gallagher, CSB 2003 – 2005
- Dr. Bryn Kulmatycki 2005 – 2010
- Rev. Shayne Craig 2010 – 2012
- Most Rev. Paul Terrio 2012
- Dr. Jason West 2012 – 2024
- Dr. Jo-Ann Badley 2024 - 2025
- Dr. Darren E. Dahl 2025 - Present
