= St. Joseph Seminary (Edmonton) =

Roman Catholic seminary in Alberta, Canada

Saint Joseph Seminary
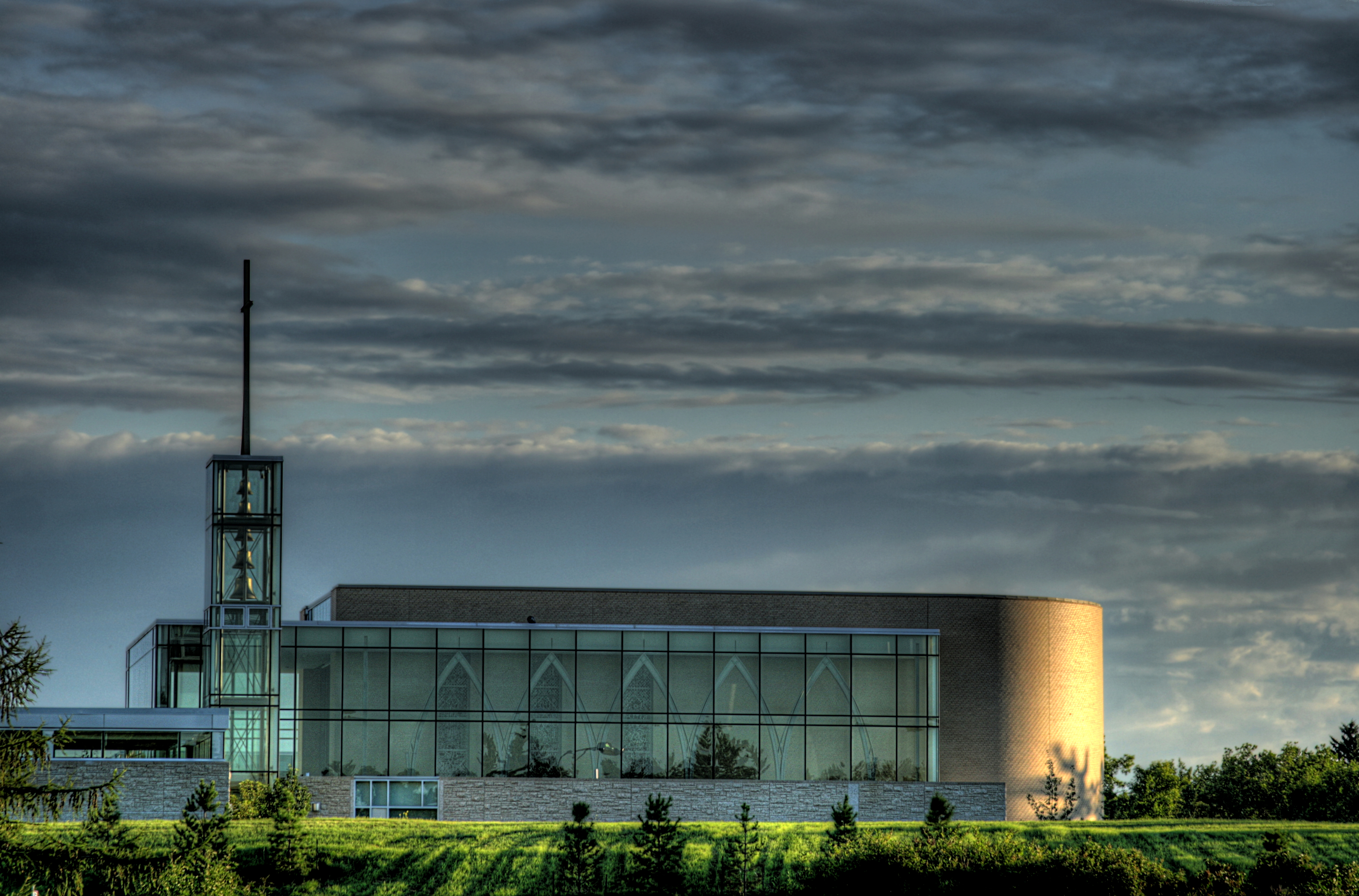
- Motto: Exiit Qui Seminat
- Motto in English: The Sower Went Out
- Established: 1927
- Affiliations: Newman Theological College
- Religious affiliation: Roman Catholic
- Rector: Rev. Sylvain Casavant
- Location: Edmonton, Alberta, Canada; 53.538696°N 113.457865°W
- Website: http://www.stjoseph-seminary.com/

St. Joseph Seminary is a Roman Catholic Seminary located in Edmonton, Alberta.

== History ==
The Seminary opened 1927 under the episcopacy of Archbishop Henry Joseph O'Leary for the training and formation of diocesan priests in what had previously been a Seminary in Downtown Edmonton run by the Oblates of Mary Immaculate. The Seminary moved from downtown Edmonton to St. Albert Trail near St. Albert in 1957. In light of the Second Vatican Council, Newman Theological College was set up in 1969 as a degree-granting institution within the same building and began accepting lay students and students from other denominations, while the seminary continued to be used for the formation of Catholic clergy. Since its inception, Newman Theological College has granted all degrees for St. Joseph Seminary students; the seminary itself does not grant any degrees. In 2007, the province bought the seminary's land in order to build Anthony Henday Drive, requiring the seminary to vacate in June 2009. In the 2010, the seminary, along with Newman, moved to new and separate facilities at the intersection of 98 Avenue and 84 Street near the edge of the North Saskatchewan River valley.

In 1990, Archbishop Joseph McNeil invited the Society of Saint-Sulpice to take charge of the formation of seminarians.

Pope Francis resided in St. Joseph Seminary during his visit to Canada in July 2022.

== Recent Rectors of St. Joseph Seminary ==
- Rev. Lionel Gendron (1990–94) (Currently Bishop of Saint-Jean-Longueuil, Quebec)
- Rev. Marc Ouellet (1994–97) (Currently Cardinal Prefect of Congregation for Bishops, Vatican City)
- Rev. Jean Papen (1997–2000) (Deceased)
- Rev. Luc Bouchard (2000–01) (Currently Bishop of Trois-Rivières, Quebec)
- Rev. Lionel Gendron (2002)
- Rev. Louis-Paul Gauvreau (2002–04) (Deceased)
- Rev. Kevin Beach (2004–05) (Currently Monsignor Beach is Vicar General of Ottawa)
- Rev. Shayne Craig (2005–12)
- Rev. Stephen Hero (2012–2021) (Currently Archbishop of Edmonton, Alberta)
- Rev. Sylvain Casavant (2021-Present)

== Current Formation Team at the Seminary ==
- Rev. Sylvain Casavant, pss (Rector)
- Sr. Dr. Zoe Bernatsky SSMI
- Rev. Andrew Szablewski, pss
- Rev. Dr. Augusto Garcia, pss
- Rev. Murray Kuemper
- Rev. Dr. John Kohler
- Rev. Geoffrey Young
