= Thévenot =

Thévenot (English: /ˈtɛvənoʊ/, French: [tevəno]) is a surname. Notable people with the surname include:

- Albert Privet Thévenot (1945–2025), Canadian Roman Catholic bishop
- Jean de Thévenot (1633–1667), French traveller, nephew of Melchisédech Thévenot
- Laurent Thévenot (born 1949), French sociologist
- Melchisédech Thévenot (1620–1692), French scientist and traveller
- Pascal Thévenot (born 1966), French politician
- Prisca Thévenot (born 1985), French politician
