= Kenneth Thorson =

Canadian Roman Catholic bishop (born 1966)

The Most Reverend Kenneth Reid Thorson O.M.I.
- Bishop of Prince Albert
- Church: Catholic Church
- Diocese: Prince Albert
- Appointed: 28 May 2026
- Installed: 22 August 2026
- Predecessor: Stephen Andrew Hero

Orders
- Ordination: 21 May 1999
- Consecration: 22 August 2026 by Donald Bolen

Personal details
- Born: 19 September 1966 (age 59) Saskatoon, Saskatchewan, Canada
- Education: University of Saskatchewan; Pontifical Gregorian University
- Motto: Augendo in fide, spe et caritate

Kenneth Reid Thorson, O.M.I. (born 19 September 1966) is a Canadian Roman Catholic prelate who has served as bishop of Prince Albert since 2026. He was appointed by Pope Leo XIV on 28 May 2026, and was ordained and installed on 22 August 2026, becoming the ninth bishop of the Diocese of Prince Albert.

== Early life and education ==
Kenneth Reid Thorson was born in Saskatoon, Saskatchewan, on 19 September 1966, to Chester and Joanne Thorson. He is one of five children. In 1979, his family moved to Nipawin, Saskatchewan, in the Diocese of Prince Albert, where he spent his teenage years. He completed a year of seminary formation for the Diocese of Prince Albert before discerning a vocation with the Oblates.

Thorson entered the novitiate of the Missionary Oblates of Mary Immaculate in Arnprior, Ontario, on 26 August 1992. He pursued philosophical and theological studies in Saskatoon, Edmonton, Rome, and Toronto. He holds a Bachelor of Arts from the University of Saskatchewan and a Baccalaureate in Sacred Theology from the Pontifical Gregorian University.

Thorson professed his first religious vows on 14 August 1993, and his perpetual vows on 19 August 1997. He was ordained a deacon on 14 June 1998, and a priest on 21 May 1999.

== Priesthood ==
Following his ordination to the priesthood, Thorson served at St. Patrick's Parish in Saskatoon from 1999 to 2003, initially as assistant pastor and subsequently as pastor. During this period he also served as chaplain at E.D. Feehan Catholic High School.

In 2003, Thorson was assigned to the Anglo-Irish Province of the Oblates and became a member of a community in Birmingham, England, which was exploring Oblate mission in a secular and interfaith context. In 2008, he was assigned to the OMI Lacombe Province's St. Charles Formation Community in Ottawa and appointed vocation director.

Thorson became vicar provincial of the OMI Lacombe Canada Province in 2013. On 24 January 2019, he was appointed provincial superior, serving two terms until completing his service in June 2025. During his tenure he participated in two Oblate General Chapters and represented the congregation in its work at the international level.

As provincial superior, Thorson was involved in the Oblates' response to their historical involvement in Canadian residential schools, including work concerning truth and reconciliation and the release of historical records. The Diocese of Prince Albert described this work as contributing to his commitment to reconciliation with Indigenous peoples in Canada.

== Episcopacy ==
On 28 May 2026, Pope Leo XIV appointed Thorson bishop of the Diocese of Prince Albert. He succeeded Stephen Andrew Hero, who had been appointed archbishop of Edmonton in 2025.

Thorson's episcopal ordination took place on 22 August 2026, at the Sacred Heart Cathedral in Prince Albert, Saskatchewan. He was consecrated by Donald Bolen, archbishop of Regina, with Susai Jesu, O.M.I., archbishop of Keewatin–Le Pas, and Albert LeGatt, archbishop of Saint Boniface, serving as co-consecrators. He was installed as the ninth bishop of Prince Albert during the same celebration.

The ordination celebration included a Treaty 6 land acknowledgement and an Indigenous honour song. The Apostolic Letter appointing Thorson was read during the ceremony, after which he made the customary episcopal promises before receiving the insignia of his office, including the mitre, crozier, and episcopal ring.

Thorson's return to the Diocese of Prince Albert was described as a homecoming, owing to his family's move to Nipawin during his adolescence and his earlier period of seminary formation in the diocese. In his remarks following the ordination, he emphasized his intention to serve the people of the diocese and to walk with them as their bishop.
