= Bethlehem Chapel (disambiguation) =

Bethlehem Chapel is a medieval religious building in Prague.

Bethlehem Chapel may refer to:

- Bethlehem Chapel, Richmond
- Bethlehem Chapel, Mountain Ash
- Bethlehem Chapel (Saint-Jean-de-Boiseau)
