= Diocese of Saint Paul, Alberta =

Catholic ecclesiastical territory

Coordinates: 53.9928°N 111.2970°W

Diocese of Saint Paul, Alberta Dioecesis Sancti Pauli in Alberta
- Coat of arms

Location
- Country: Canada
- Ecclesiastical province: Edmonton

Statistics
- Area: 155,916 km^{2} (60,200 sq mi)
- Population: 105,177 (42.3%)
- Parishes: 20

Information
- Denomination: Catholic
- Sui iuris church: Latin Church
- Rite: Roman Rite
- Established: July 17, 1948
- Cathedral: St. Paul Cathedral
- Secular priests: 24

Current leadership
- Pope: Leo XIV
- Bishop: Gary Anthony Franken
- Metropolitan Archbishop: Stephen Andrew Hero
- Bishops emeritus: Paul Terrio

Map

Website
- www.dioceseofstpaul.ca

The Diocese of Saint Paul in Alberta (Latin: Dioecesis Sancti Pauli in Alberta) is a Latin Church ecclesiastical territory or diocese of the Catholic Church that includes part of the civil province of Alberta. On September 15, 2022, Gary Anthony Franken, was appointed Bishop of Saint Paul, succeeding Paul Terrio.

As of 2018, the diocese contains 20 parishes and 21 missions, 18 active diocesan priests, 6 religious priests, 8 permanent deacons, and approximately 104,000 Catholics. It also has 13 women religious. The Diocese of Saint Paul in Alberta is a suffragan diocese in the ecclesiastical province of the metropolitan Archdiocese of Edmonton.

== Bishops ==
The following is a list of the bishops of the diocese and their terms of service:

- Maurice Baudoux (1948–1952), appointed Coadjutor Archbishop of Saint-Boniface, Manitoba
- Philippe Lussier (1952–1968)
- Édouard Gagnon (1969–1972)
- Raymond Roy (1972–1997)
- Thomas Collins (1997–1999); appointed Coadjutor Archbishop of Edmonton; was Apostolic Administrator here in 2001; future Cardinal
- Luc-André Bouchard (2001–2012), appointed Bishop of Trois-Rivières, Québec
- Paul Terrio (2012–2022)
- Gary Anthony Franken (2022–present)

=== Coadjutor bishop ===
- Thomas Collins (1997); future Cardinal

== List of parishes ==
There are 20 parishes within the diocese.

St. Paul Cathedral, St. Paul, Alberta

- Rector: Gérard Gauthier
  - Associate Rector: André Semusambi
    - Deacon: Greg Ouellette

St. Michael, Elk Point, Alberta

- Pastor: Gérard Gauthier
  - Deacon: Mitch Goulet

St. Gabriel, Athabasca, Alberta

- Pastor: Paulson Kannanaikal, cmi

St. Anne, Barrhead, Alberta
Mission of St. John the Evangelist, Swan Hills, Alberta

- Pastor: John Rohit VC, ims

St. Louis, Bonnyville, Alberta

- Pastor: Rene Realuyo

St. Alphonsus, Boyle, Alberta
Mission of Holy Rosary, Buffalo Lake Métis Settlement, Alberta

- Pastor:

St. Dominic, Cold Lake, Alberta
Mission of Our Lady of the Assumption, Cold Lake, Alberta

- Pastor: Limneo Zamora Jr. (Fr. Nong)

St. John the Baptist, Fort McMurray, Alberta
Mission of St. Gabriel, Janvier, Alberta
Mission of St. Vincent, Conklin, Alberta

- Pastor: Augustine Joseph, cmi
  - Associate Pastor: Antony Thomas, ims
    - Deacon: Raymond Chan

St. Paul Church, Fort McMurray, Alberta
Mission of Nativity of Blessed Virgin Mary, Fort Chipewyan, Alberta
Mission of St. Julien, Fort MacKay, Alberta

- Pastor: Francis of Assisi Khai Phan
  - Associate Pastor: Jayson Durante

St. Catherine, Lac La Biche, Alberta
Mission of Immaculate Heart of Mary, Kikino, Alberta

- Pastor: Aureus Manjares
  - Deacon: Pat Murphy
  - Deacon: Gordon Taylor

St. Raphael, LeGoff, Alberta
Mission of St. Marguerite d'Youville, Elizabeth Métis Settlement, Alberta
Mission of Our Lady of Good Counsel, Frog Lake Reserve, Alberta
Mission of St. Eugene, Fishing Lake, Alberta

- Pastor: Thomas Dieu Hoang Nguyen

St. Emile, Legal, Alberta

- Pastor: Anselmo Landoy

St. Jean de Brebeuf, Mallaig, Alberta
Mission of St. Helen, St. Lina, Alberta
Mission of Our Lady of Mercy, Kehewin, Alberta

- Pastor: Raldy Jhack Diaz (Fr. Jhack)

St. Jean Baptiste, Morinville, Alberta

- Pastor: Trini C. Pinca

St. Isidore, Plamondon, Alberta
Mission of St. Theresa of the Child Jesus, Breynat, Alberta

- Pastor: Jestoni Porras
  - Deacon: Jerry Metz

St. Laurent, Brosseau, Alberta

- Pastor:

St. Matthias, Goodfish Lake, Alberta
Mission of Sacred Heart, Saddle Lake, Alberta

- Pastor:

St. Anne, Thorhild, Alberta
Mission of Our Lady of the Atonement, Smoky Lake, Alberta
Mission of St. Joseph, Radway, Alberta

- Pastor: Sebastian Chittilappilly, cmi

St. Mary of Assumption, Westlock, Alberta
Mission of St. Finnan, Dapp, Alberta
Mission of St. Patrick, Clyde, Alberta

- Pastor: Ambrose Umeohanna, smmm

St. Joseph, Whitecourt, Alberta
Mission of Our Lady of Peace, Fox Creek, Alberta

- Pastor: Benjamin Belgica
