= Blaise-Ernest Morand =

Canadian Roman Catholic bishop (born 1932)

The Most Reverend Blaise-Ernest Morand
- Bishop Emeritus of Prince Albert
- Church: Roman Catholic Church
- Diocese: Diocese of Prince Albert
- Installed: 9 April 1983
- Term ended: 26 May 2008
- Predecessor: Laurent Morin
- Successor: Albert Privet Thévenot
- Previous posts: Coadjutor Bishop of Prince Albert (1981–1983); Vicar General of Saskatoon (1979–1981)

Orders
- Ordination: 22 March 1958 by John Christopher Cody
- Consecration: 29 June 1981 by Laurent Morin, James Patrick Mahoney and Eugène Philippe LaRocque

Personal details
- Born: Blaise-Ernest Morand; 12 September 1932 (age 94) Tecumseh, Ontario, Canada
- Motto: Dum Spiro Spero

Blaise-Ernest Morand (born 12 September 1932) is a Canadian Roman Catholic prelate. He served as the seventh Bishop of the Diocese of Prince Albert in Saskatchewan from 1983 until his retirement in 2008.

== Early life and priesthood ==
Morand was born in Tecumseh, Ontario. He completed his primary education in his hometown, his classical studies at the Collège de l’Assomption in Windsor, and his philosophical and theological studies at St. Peter’s Seminary in London, and was ordained a diocesan priest for the Diocese of London, Ontario on 22 March 1958.

He later moved to Saskatchewan, where he was incardinated into the Diocese of Saskatoon in 1967. While in Saskatoon, he engaged in parish ministry, serving as pastor at St. John Bosco Parish. In June 1979, he was appointed Vicar General of the Diocese of Saskatoon by Bishop James Patrick Mahoney.

== Episcopal ministry ==
On 22 April 1981, Pope John Paul II appointed Morand as the Coadjutor Bishop of the Diocese of Prince Albert. He received his episcopal consecration on 29 June 1981, from Bishop Laurent Morin, with Bishop James Patrick Mahoney and Bishop Eugène Philippe LaRocque serving as co-consecrators.

Upon the retirement of Bishop Morin, Morand automatically succeeded him as the Bishop of Prince Albert on 9 April 1983. During his 25-year tenure, Morand oversaw the diocese's transition through shifting demographics and addressed rural clergy shortages by actively recruiting international priests from countries such as Poland, Ghana, the Philippines, and Vietnam.

== Retirement ==
Upon reaching the mandatory retirement age of 75, Morand submitted his resignation to the Holy See. Pope Benedict XVI accepted his resignation on 26 May 2008, and named Albert Privet Thévenot as his successor.

Following his retirement, Morand assumed the title of Bishop Emeritus.
