= Our Lady of the Rockies High School =

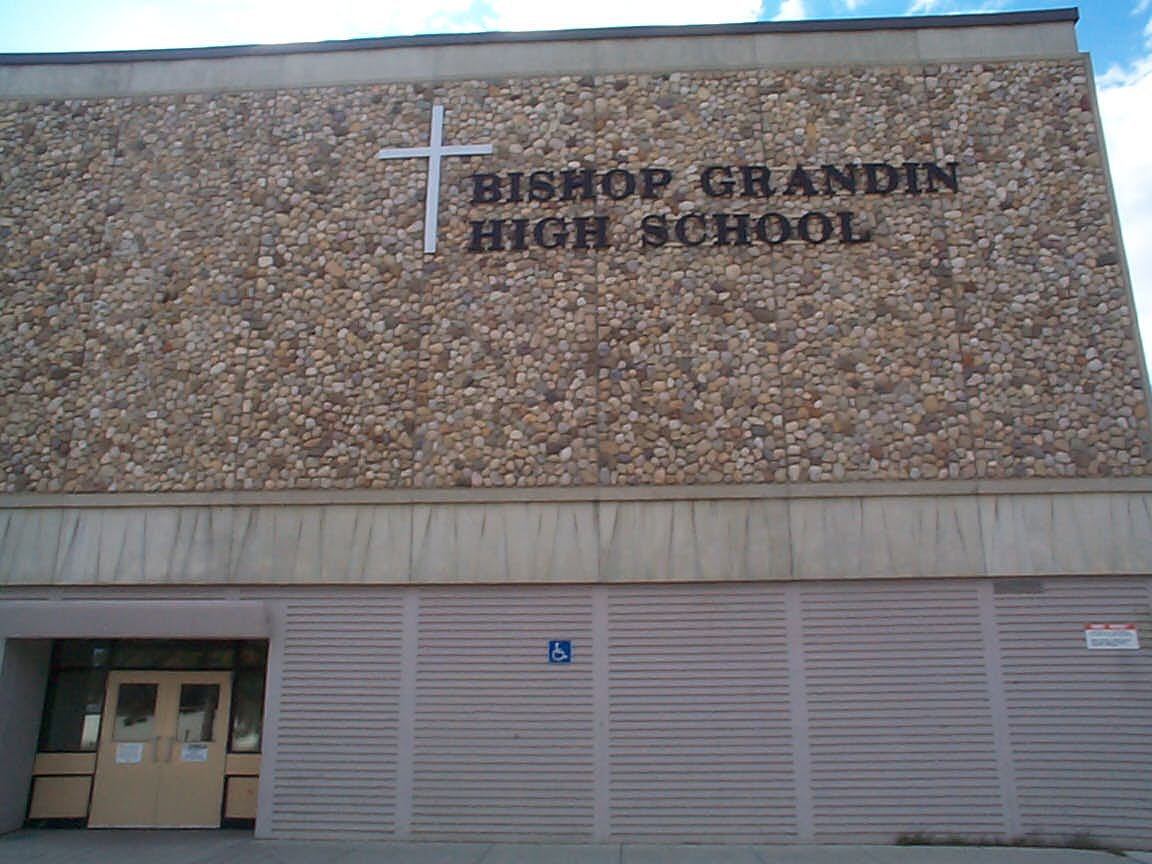

Location
- 111 Haddon Road Sw; Calgary, Alberta, T2V 2Y2; Canada; 50.974911°N 114.07788°W

Information
- Former name: Bishop Grandin High School
- School type: High School
- Religious affiliation: Roman Catholic
- Founded: 1962
- School board: Calgary Catholic School District
- Principal: Marilyn Nasse
- Grades: 10-12
- Enrollment: 1300
- Language: English, French
- Colours: Red, White and Black
- Team name: Grizzlies
- Website: ourladyoftherockies.cssd.ab.ca

Our Lady of the Rockies High School is operated by the Calgary Catholic School District. It is a composite high school and one of the largest in Calgary, serving just under 1300 students in the communities of south Calgary, Alberta. It is located at 111 Haddon Road SW Calgary, Alberta, Canada.

The school was originally named Bishop Grandin High School, after Bishop Vital-Justin Grandin. The Calgary Catholic School District decided to rename the school in June 2021 following the 2021 Canadian Indian residential schools gravesite discoveries, due to the role Bishop Grandin played in the creation of the indigenous residential school system. On 28 June 2021 the school was temporarily renamed Haysboro Catholic High School as new names were being considered.

On October 6, 2021 Our Lady of the Rockies High School was the new permanent name chosen to replace Bishop Grandin High School.

The program offerings include all of the academic disciplines, an Advanced Placement (A.P.) program, extensive art, drama, choir and music programs including an elite marching band, an Extended French program, an Integrated Occupation program, a Registered Apprentice program, International Languages, an Active Life Skills physical education program, and an extensive Career and Technology Studies program.

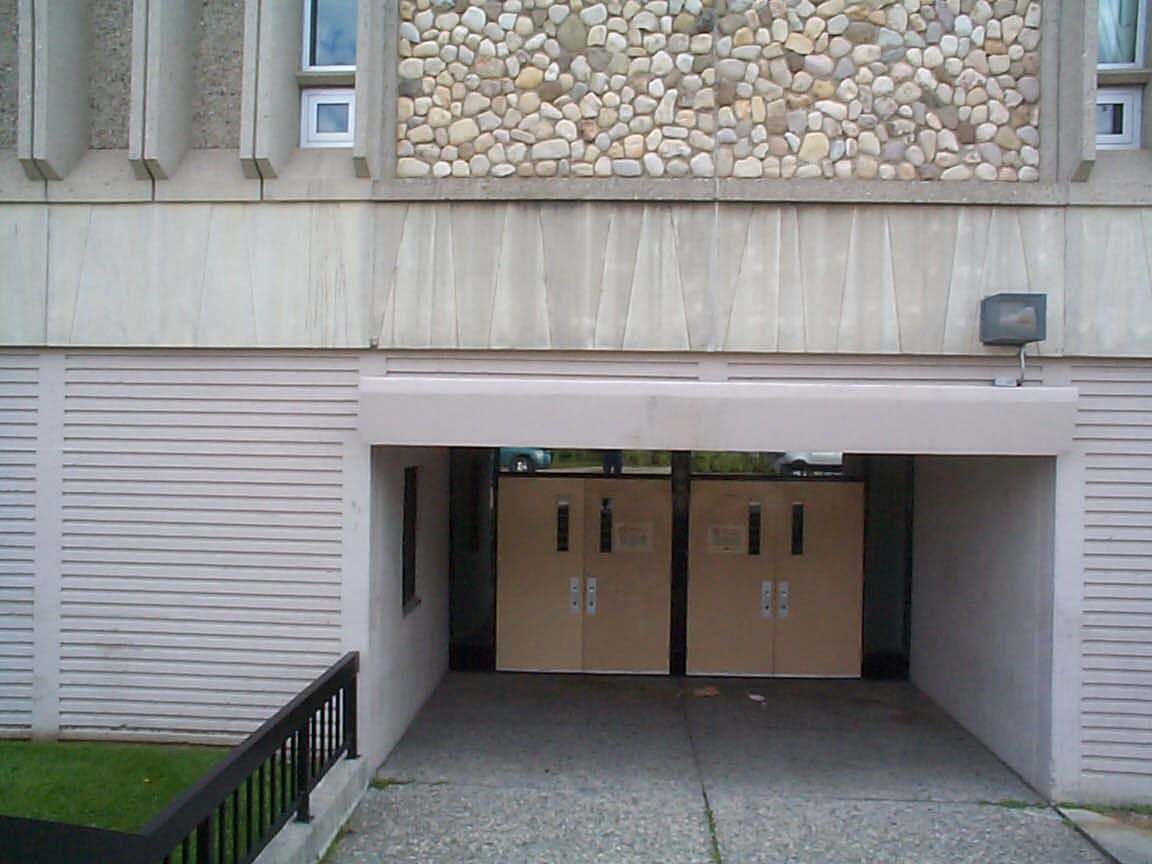
Side doors

== Academics ==
General academics

Our Lady of the Rockies offers a variety of choices in academics with strong English, Sciences, Social Studies and Mathematics departments. Diploma examination results are among the highest in the Calgary Catholic School District and the City of Calgary and rank above the provincial average. Our Lady of the Rockies also features extensive Physical Education, Fine Arts and Languages departments.

Advanced placement

The Advanced Placement Program (AP) is a co-operative educational endeavour between secondary schools and colleges and universities. AP courses allow high school students to experience University level academic learning in addition to the Alberta Education curriculum. Our Lady of the Rockies offers AP courses in the Social Studies, Science, English, Mathematics, Extended French, and Fine Arts departments.

== Performing arts ==
=== Marching Ghosts ===
Our Lady of the Rockies Marching Ghosts is the only Elite High School marching show band in Calgary and all of western Canada. The band was founded in 1986, has over 100 musicians, and has performed internationally including in Europe, Australia, New Zealand, Japan, the United States, and Canada. The Marching Ghosts won their first Canadian National Marching Championship in Regina, Saskatchewan in 1999 performing "The Mask of Zorro". The Marching Ghosts won their first Showbands Live title in 2010 with their "Nightfall" show and got their second Showbands Live title in 2014 with their "Ocean" show. The Marching Ghosts have also won the title of "Best Senior Band" in the 2007, 2009 and 2010 annual Stampede parade; They've also won "Best Canadian Band" and "Best overall Band" in the years of 2007 and 2009.

=== Choir ===
Our Lady of the Rockies Choir performs across Canada and the United States. At the Heritage Festival in New York City on April 27, 2013 the Junior, Senior, and Ensemble choir received top honors and gold awards while competing against some of the best choir groups on the continent. Students wishing to enroll in Our Lady of the Rockies' elite choir must register in Choral Music.

=== Drama ===
Our Lady of the Rockies Drama program hosts two major performances every year. Students interested in the Drama program are able to enroll in Drama 10, 20, or 30 and audition for the semi-annual plays.

=== Dance ===
The Dance program at Our Lady of the Rockies encourages students to express themselves and their ideas through movement while developing strong technique and skills. Students can enroll in Dance Performance 15, 25, or 35. Each semester, the program concludes with a showcase where students perform and share their growth and artistry.

== Extracurricular activities ==
=== Speech and debate ===
Speech and Debate at Our Lady of the Rockies provide students an opportunity to develop and enhance their oratory abilities as well as their argumentation structure. Speech categories include original oratory, impromptu, monologue, duet acting, poetry, and prose.

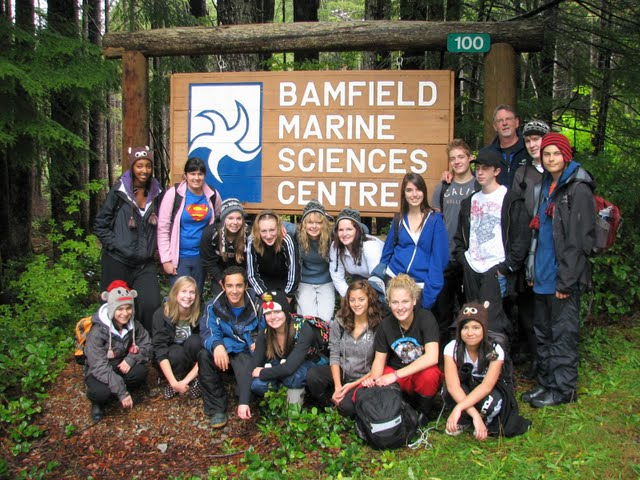
Biology AP at Bamfield

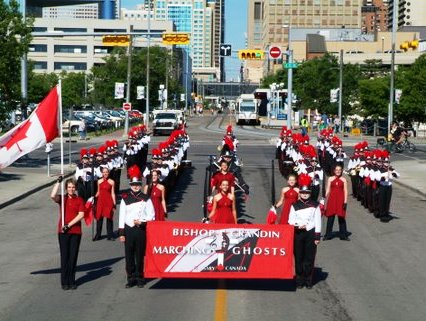
Marching Ghosts

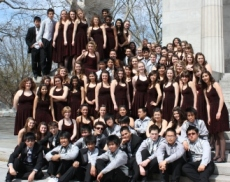
Show Choir

== Historical sexual abuse ==
In 2019, two former students of Bishop Grandin High School settled lawsuits for the sexual abuse they experienced at the hands of Father Frederick Cahill. Cahill was a Basilian priest and a teacher at Bishop Grandin High School. Father Cahill died in 1983.

== See also ==
- Vital-Justin Grandin - Story of Bishop Grandin
