= St. Paul Cathedral (St. Paul, Alberta) =

Church building in Alberta, Canada

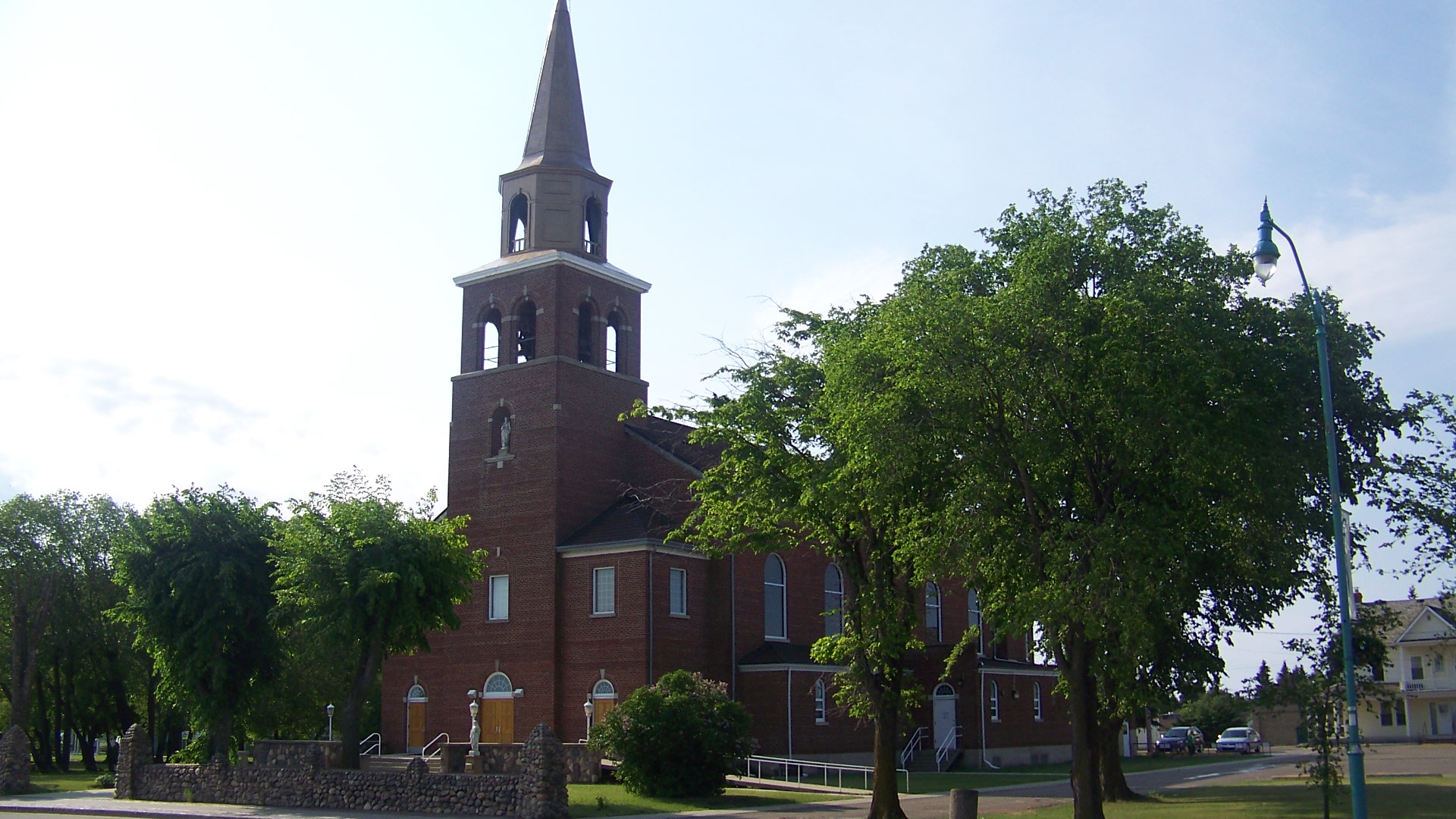
- Saint Paul Cathedral (St. Paul)

Religion
- Affiliation: Roman Catholic Church
- Province: Roman Catholic Diocese of Saint Paul, Alberta
- Rite: Roman Rite
- Leadership: Bishop Gary Franken, Rev. Andrew Schoenberger

Location
- Location: 4625 50th Ave. St. Paul, Alberta; Canada
- Interactive map of St. Paul Cathedral
- Coordinates: 53.99089°N 111.28807°W

Website
- https://www.spcp.ca

St. Paul Cathedral is the mother church of the Roman Catholic Diocese of Saint Paul, Alberta. The cathedral is located in St. Paul, Alberta on Alberta Highway 29 near downtown. The current rector of the cathedral is Rev. Andrew Schoenberger. Services are conducted in both French and English. The church has been the seat of the bishop of the diocese since its formation on August 7, 1948. The parish associated with the church has been in existence since 1859.

On May 9, 2014, John Carlos Quadro, a St. Paul resident, showed up at the Cathedral Rectory and when Father Gilbert Dasna SMMM answered the door, Quadro shot the priest 5 times then dashed into his truck, leaving the priest alone where he succumbed to his injuries.

== Gallery ==
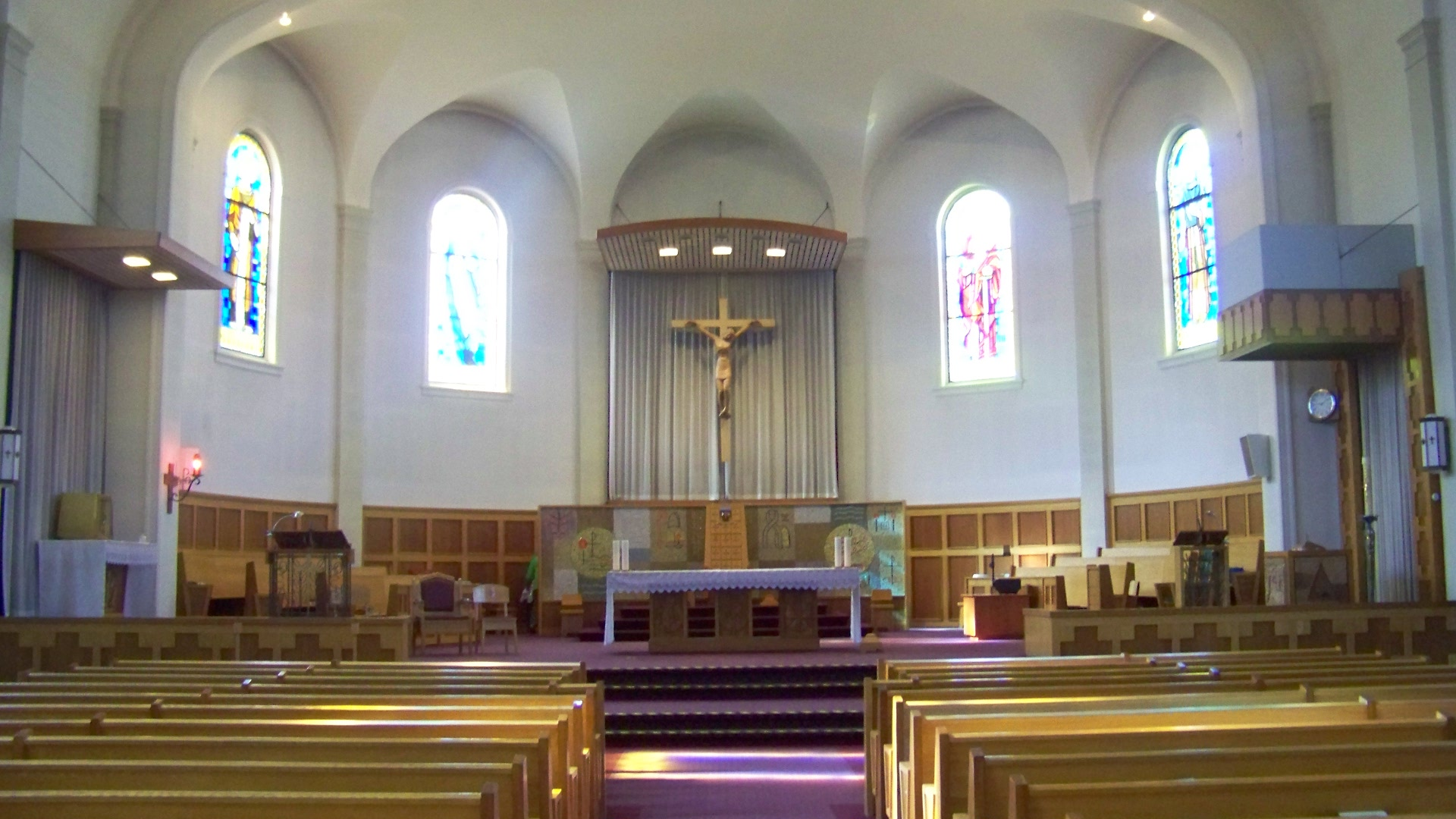
Interior

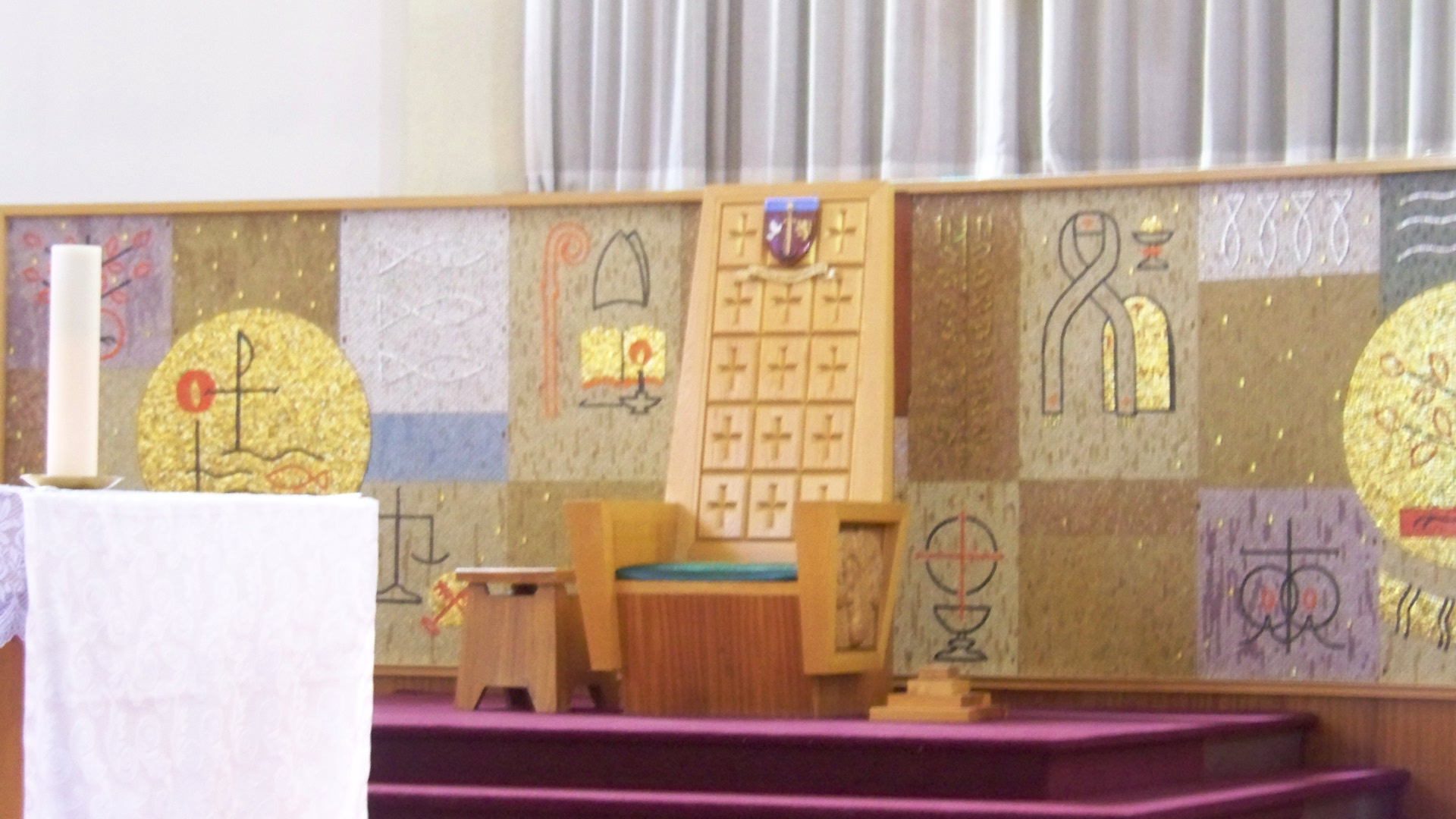
Cathedra (Bishop's Seat)

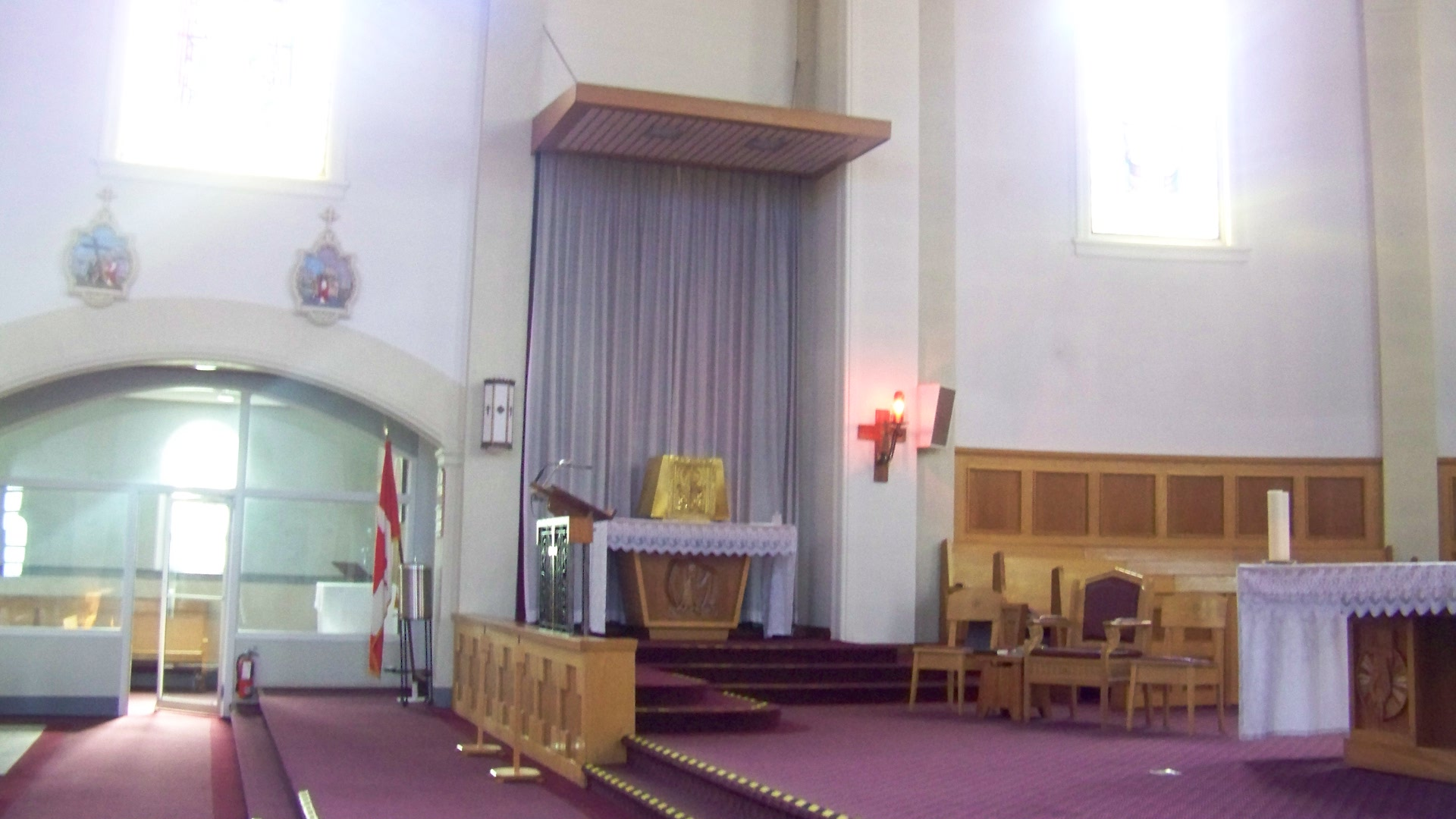
Tabernacle

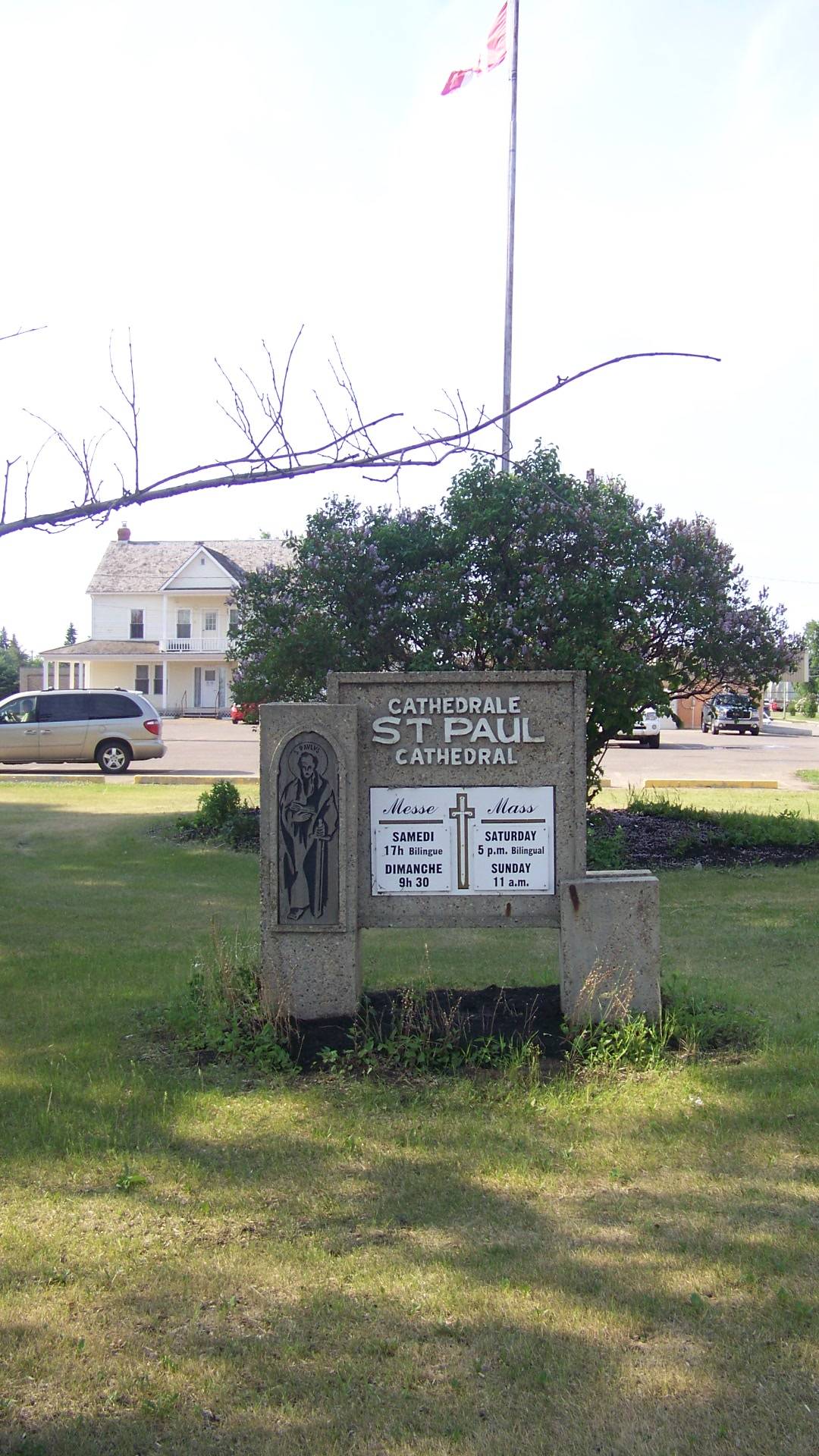
Road Sign

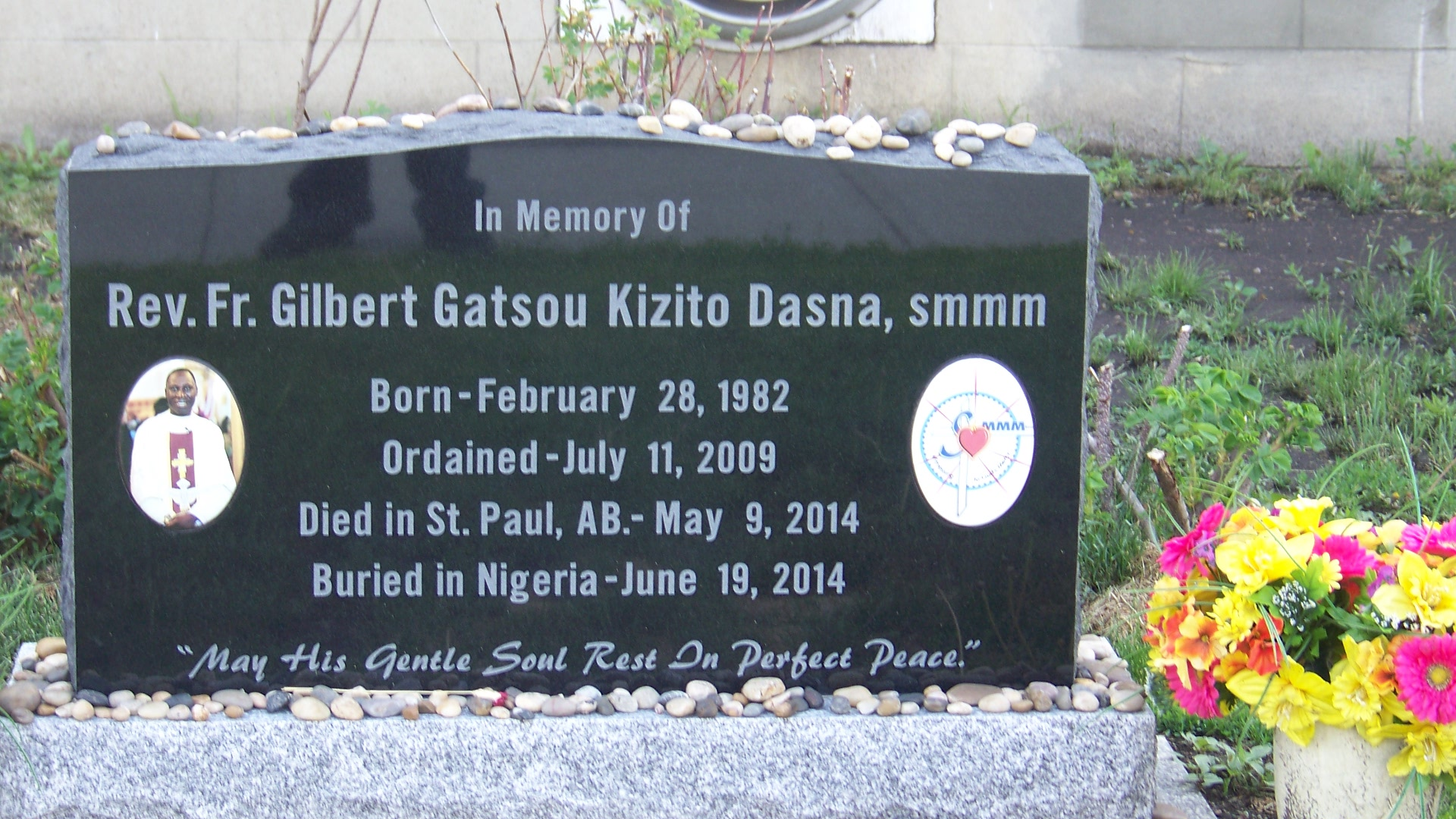
Father Gilbert Dasna Memorial
