= Laurent Morin =

Canadian Roman Catholic bishop

- Bishop of Prince-Albert
- Church: Catholic Church
- Diocese: Diocese of Prince Albert
- In office: 28 February 1959 – 9 April 1983
- Predecessor: Léo Blais
- Successor: Blaise-Ernest Morand
- Previous posts: Titular Bishop of Arsamosata (1955-1959); Auxiliary Bishop of Montreal (1955-1959)

Orders
- Ordination: 27 May 1934
- Consecration: 30 October 1955 by Paul-Émile Léger

Personal details
- Born: 14 February 1908 Montreal, Quebec, Dominion of Canada, British Empire
- Died: 31 December 1996 (aged 88)

Laurent Morin (14 February 1908, in Montreal – 31 December 1996) was a Canadian Roman Catholic bishop. He was ordained a priest for the Archdiocese of Montreal on 27 May 1934 and was appointed to the post of titular bishop of Arsamosata and auxiliary bishop of Montreal on 8 September 1955. His consecration was on October 30 with chief consecrator Paul-Émile Léger, assisted by Joseph-Conrad Chaumont and Lawrence Patrick Whelan.

Morin became bishop of the Diocese of Prince Albert from 28 February 1959 until he retired on 9 April 1983. He participated in the Second Vatican Council.
