= Robert Jacobson =

Joseph Robert Jacobson (born 1940), known as Robert Jacobson, is a former Lutheran bishop who became a Roman Catholic priest upon his conversion from Lutheranism. He was formerly the Bishop of the Alberta Synod of the Evangelical Lutheran Church in Canada.

== Early life and Lutheran ministry ==
Jacobson was born in Milwaukee, Wisconsin, United States, in 1940, the son of a Lutheran minister. He earned his Bachelor of Arts degree from Saint Olaf College and his Bachelor of Divinity degree from the Strasbourg University, France, before graduating from Northwestern Lutheran Theological Seminary in Minneapolis, Minnesota, in 1965.

After serving four Lutheran parishes in Alberta, Canada, and homeschooling in the early 1980s, in 1985 he was elected the first bishop of the Alberta Synod of the Evangelical Lutheran Church in Canada. Jacobson served in missions all over Canada, serving in that position for 10 years.

During his term as Lutheran bishop, Jacobson ordained many women as ministers but he said that doesn't mean he endorses it for the Roman Catholic Church.

== Conversion to Roman Catholicism and ordination to the priesthood ==
In 1998, almost five years after he took "early retirement" as Lutheran bishop, Archbishop Joseph MacNeil invited Jacobson to consider becoming a priest. Jacobson and his wife Carolyne, who live on a farm near Bashaw, Alberta, began the Rite of Christian Initiation of Adults at Immaculate Heart of Mary Parish in Bashaw in 1999 and became Roman Catholics at the Easter Vigil of 2000.

Jacobson's conversion is also due to him to have served as co-chairman of the Lutheran–Catholic theological dialogue for Canada for almost eight years together with Adam Exner, the Roman Catholic Archbishop of Vancouver.

Forty years after he was ordained a Lutheran minister, Jacobson converted to Roman Catholicism and was ordained to the priesthood on February 2, 2007, in the Archdiocese of Grouard–McLennan in Canada.

== Personal life ==
Jacobson also pursues interests in botany and animal life as well as in music and poetry. A prolific writer, he has written several books, the latest being All Nature Sings, a book of poems that speaks about creation and new creation through the eyes of the Scriptures.

In addition to English, Jacobson is fluent in German, French and Spanish.
