= Saint-Jean-de-Boiseau =

- Commune
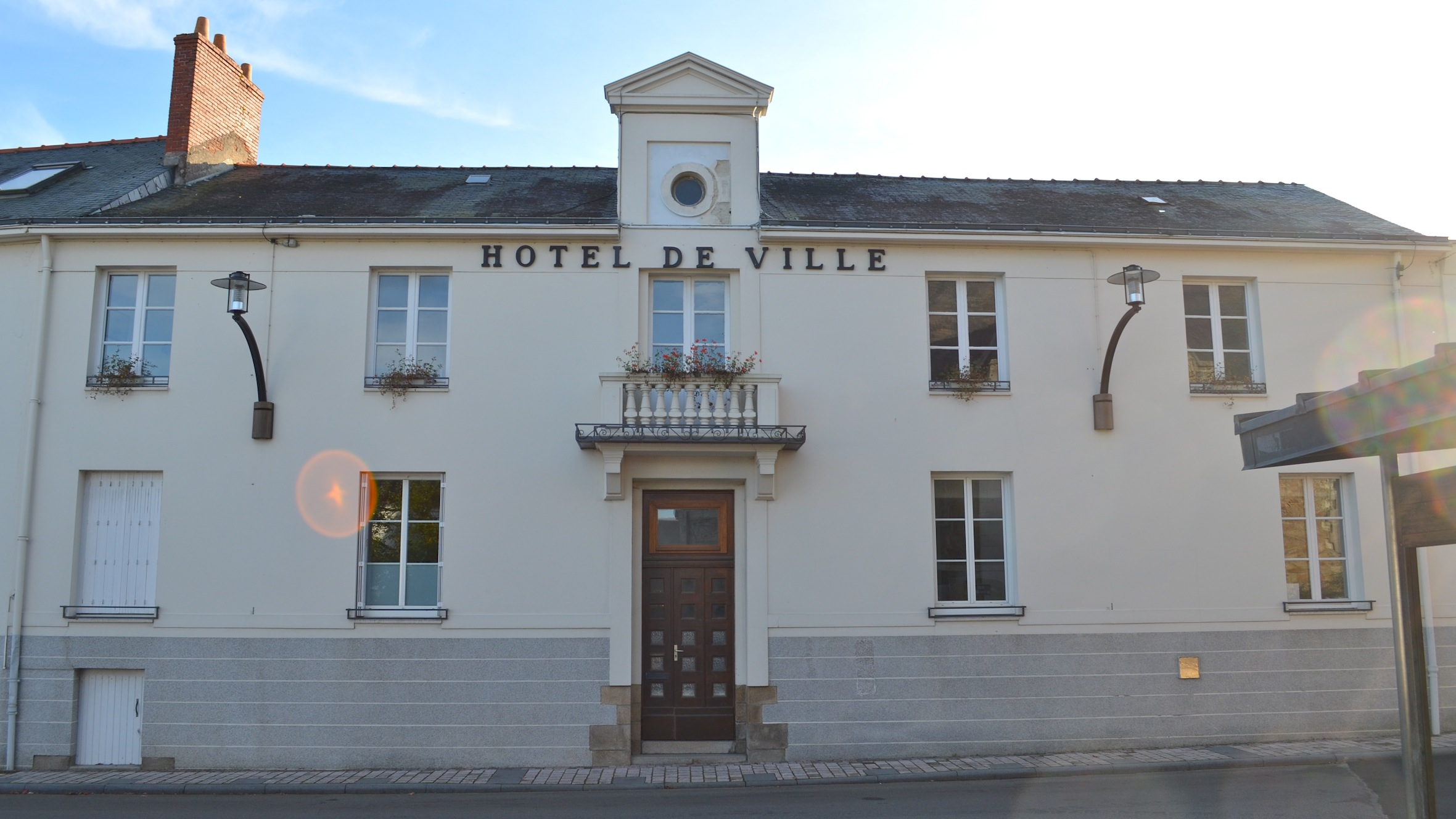
- The town hall in Saint-Jean-de-Boiseau

- Coat of arms
- Location of Saint-Jean-de-Boiseau
- Location within France Location within Pays de la Loire
- Coordinates: 47°11′41″N 1°43′23″W
- Country: France
- Region: Pays de la Loire
- Department: Loire-Atlantique
- Arrondissement: Nantes
- Canton: Saint-Brevin-les-Pins
- Intercommunality: Nantes Métropole

Government
  - Mayor (2020–2026): Pascal Pras
- Area^{1}: 11.4 km^{2} (4.4 sq mi)
- Highest elevation: 34 m (112 ft)
- Lowest elevation: 0 m (0 ft)
- Population (2023): 6,067
  - Density: 532/km^{2} (1,380/sq mi)
- Time zone: UTC+01:00 (CET)
  - Summer (DST): UTC+02:00 (CEST)
- INSEE/Postal code: 44166 /44640
- ^{1} French Land Register data, which excludes lakes, ponds, glaciers > 1 km^{2} (0.386 sq mi or 247 acres) and river estuaries.

Saint-Jean-de-Boiseau (French pronunciation: [sɛ̃ ʒɑ̃ də bwaso]; Breton: Sant-Yann-ar-Granneg) is a commune in the Loire-Atlantique department in western France. It contains the historic Bethlehem Chapel.

== Population ==
Historical population
Year	Pop.	±% p.a.
1968	2,615	—
1975	3,102	+2.47%
1982	3,627	+2.26%
1990	4,120	+1.61%
1999	4,562	+1.14%
2007	4,716	+0.42%
2012	5,344	+2.53%
2017	5,827	+1.75%
2023	6,067	+0.67%
Source: INSEE

== Notable people ==
- Barthélémy Baraille (1882-1970), a member of the criminal anarchist Bonnot gang, was a municipal councillor from Saint-Jean-de-Boiseau around 1945.
- Edmond Bertreux (1911-1991), painter, is buried in the cemetery of Saint-Jean-de-Boiseau, which he often depicted in his art.
- Jean Brochard (1893-1972), actor, resident of Saint-Jean-de-Boiseau after having bought the house that his grandmother lived; he spent the rest of his life there.
- Émile-Joseph Legal (1849-1920), oblate missionnary, founder of the colony of Saint-Paul-des-Métis in the province of Alberta in Canada.
- Mose (1917-2003), designer, was born there.

== See also ==
- Communes of the Loire-Atlantique department
