= 2022 visit by Pope Francis to Canada =

2022 apostolic journey to Canada

Apostolic Journey to Canada
- Official logo by Indigenous graphic artist Shaun Vincent
- Date: July 24–29, 2022
- Location: Alberta Quebec Nunavut
- Website: www.papalvisit.ca

Pope Francis visited Canada from July 24 to 29, 2022, with stops in the provinces of Alberta and Quebec and the territory of Nunavut. The trip mainly focused on apologizing for the Catholic Church's role in the Canadian Indian residential school system and on reconciliation with the country's Indigenous peoples. It was the first papal visit to Canada since World Youth Day 2002, which was held in Toronto.

== Background ==
The visit was announced in May 2022, after Pope Francis had met with a delegation of Canadian Indigenous leaders and residential school survivors at the Vatican six weeks earlier. During that meeting, he apologized for the conduct of church members involved in Canadian Indian residential school system, and received invitations by members of the delegation to make an apology on Canadian soil. The pope described the trip as a "penitential pilgrimage" with the goal of contributing to the "process of healing and reconciliation with the country’s Indigenous peoples".

== Itinerary ==
=== July 24: Arrival in Edmonton, and official welcome ===
Pope Francis landed at Edmonton International Airport shortly after 11 a.m. local time, following a 10-hour flight from Rome. Prime Minister Justin Trudeau and Governor General Mary Simon greeted him before a brief welcoming ceremony inside an airport hangar. During the ceremony, he greeted and spoke briefly with several politicians, residential school survivors and Indigenous leaders, including Confederacy of Treaty Six First Nations Grand Chief George Arcand Jr., Inuit Tapiriit Kanatami president Natan Obed, and Assembly of First Nations Chief RoseAnne Archibald. The pope was then escorted to St. Joseph Seminary in Edmonton, where he stayed while in Alberta.

=== July 25: Apology at Maskwacis and Edmonton visit ===
I am here because the first step of my penitential pilgrimage among you is that of again asking forgiveness, of telling you once more that I am deeply sorry. Sorry for the ways in which, regrettably, many Christians supported the colonizing mentality of the powers that oppressed the [I]ndigenous peoples. I am sorry. I ask forgiveness, in particular, for the ways in which many members of the Church and of religious communities cooperated, not least through their indifference, in projects of cultural destruction and forced assimilation promoted by the governments of that time, which culminated in the system of residential schools.

— Pope Francis, 2022

In the morning, Pope Francis visited Maskwacis, a community south of Edmonton that was once the site of Ermineskin Residential School, one of the largest residential schools in Canada. He attended a private meeting with leaders at a local church and visited the Ermineskin Cree Nation Cemetery, where he led a prayer. A ceremony was then held in a space near the site of the formal residential school, where Francis delivered an apology to residential school survivors; he acknowledged the "devastating" policy of residential schools and asked for forgiveness "for the evil committed by so many Christians" against Indigenous peoples. He also said that an apology was only the first step, and that a "serious investigation" should be conducted into what happened in the past. Pope Francis' remarks were delivered in his native Spanish through a translator in front of spectators counted in the thousands by CBC, including residential school survivors and their family members. Trudeau and Simon were also in attendance, along with other politicians and Indigenous leaders. Willie Littlechild, a residential school survivor and former member of the Truth and Reconciliation Commission of Canada (TRC), presented Pope Francis with a traditional Indigenous headdress.

Later in the day, the Pope returned to Edmonton and visited the Sacred Heart Church of the First Peoples, a church that combines Catholic and Indigenous rituals.

=== July 26: Holy Mass, Lac Ste. Anne Pilgrimage and Liturgy of the Word ===
Pope Francis held an open-air mass at Commonwealth Stadium in Edmonton, on a day marking the Feast of Saints Joachim and Anne, the parents of Mary, Mother of Jesus. The event was his first appearance open to the broader public and drew in an estimated 40,000 to 50,000 attendees, though about 65,000 tickets had been distributed. The Pope first appeared in a modified 2015 Jeep Wrangler Popemobile, which slowly cruised the interior perimeter of the stadium as he blessed and kissed babies who were handed to him. Pope Francis' homily focused on the importance of grandparents, but did not directly address residential schools or Indigenous culture.

In the afternoon, Pope Francis made a pilgrimage to Lac Ste. Anne, a Métis and First Nations community in northern Alberta. The lake is an important site for Catholics and indigenous people, who have made annual pilgrimages since 1889 on the Feast of Saints Joachim and Anne. The pope blessed the lake's water before leading a Liturgy of the Word at the Shrine of Ste. Anne, with the Catholic News Agency estimating about 10,000 people in attendance.

=== July 27: Arrival in Quebec, and meetings at Citadelle of Quebec ===
Pope Francis arrived in Quebec City, landing at Jean Lesage International Airport just before 3 p.m. Quebec Premier François Legault and other officials greeted him, and he proceeded to the Citadelle of Quebec. The event at the Citadelle were postponed by an hour due to a flight delay involving indigenous staff and organizers. At 4:50 p.m., the Pope arrived at the Citadelle, where Trudeau and Simon greeted him before the three entered the building for private meetings.

A ceremony was held at the Citadelle after the meetings, where the three leaders made speeches. Trudeau said that the Pope's apology had "an enormous impact", but implied more had to be done, saying that the TRC had called for "[a]pologies for the role that the Roman Catholic Church, as an institution, played in the mistreatment on the spiritual, cultural, emotional, physical and sexual abuse that Indigenous children suffered in residential schools run by the church". Simon spoke afterwards, saying that the visit showed that the Church was committed to "reconciliation, healing, hope and renewal" with Indigenous people, but that the visit was ultimately the result of the "courage and resilience" of Indigenous people and not a gift from the Church. Pope Francis' speech reiterated his apology for "local Catholic institutions" that were responsible for the residential school system. The Pope, according to the Toronto Star, also "edged further in apology" by mentioning that the Vatican and local churches were committed to promoting Indigenous culture and "spiritual accompaniment"; he also committed to respond in a “fitting way” to the calls to action by the TRC.

=== July 28: Holy Mass, and Vespers in Quebec ===
Pope Francis led a mass at the Basilica of Sainte-Anne-de-Beaupré, a pilgrimage site outside Quebec City. According to the Montreal Gazette, all 1600 seats inside the basilica were filled, which were reserved for Indigenous participants, Catholic delegations, and some government officials. The mass was also broadcast on screens outside the building, on the Plains of Abraham, and in a number of Quebec's movie theatres. Before the service began, two protestors unfurled a banner in front of the pulpit, which called for the Pope to "Rescind the doctrine", referring to the papal bulls of the 15th century authorizing the Doctrine of Discovery, which justified the colonization and conversion of non-Christians in the New World. The banner was then displayed outside the basilica as the service began.

An evening prayer service was held the Cathedral-Basilica of Notre-Dame de Québec, with Catholic cardinals, bishops and other members of the clergy in attendance. In his remarks during the service, he acknowledged for the first time the “sexual abuse of minors and vulnerable people" committed by members of the Catholic Church in residential schools. He went on to say: "Thinking about the process of healing and reconciliation with our Indigenous brothers and sisters, never again can the Christian community allow itself to be infected by the idea that one culture is superior to others, or that it is legitimate to employ ways of coercing others."

=== July 29: Meetings in Quebec, visit to Iqaluit, and departure from Canada ===
The Pope began the day in Quebec City meeting privately at the Archbishop of Quebec’s residence with the Society of Jesus, of which Francis is a member. He then had a 45-minute meeting at the residence with a 25-member delegation with residential school survivors and First Nation representatives from across Eastern Canada. Three Indigenous women carrying cradleboards, traditionally used to transport and protect babies, were asked to leave before the meeting began; organizers later said that there were not enough seats to accommodate the larger-than-planned delegation, and had to move some guests "in an effort to prioritize seats for survivors". Regional Chief of the Assembly of First Nations of Quebec and Labrador Ghislain Picard called the handling of the situation "completely unacceptable and disrespectful", saying there were too many clergy members present in a meeting focused on survivors and their supporters.

In the afternoon, Pope Francis travelled to Iqaluit, the capital of Nunavut. He first met privately with a group of residential school survivors inside Nakasuk Elementary School, which included former Nunavut commissioner Piita Irniq. The Pope then attended a community event outside the school, which featured traditional Inuit dance and throat singing. At the end of the event, he made a address where he again apologized for the "evil" perpetrated by members of the Catholic Church in the residential school system. During the speech, Pope Francis said "I'm sorry" in Inuktitut, which drew cheers from the crowd; he ended the speech by saying “thank you” in Inuktitut. The visit lasted almost four hours, with the Pope's plane leaving for Rome about 90 minutes behind schedule.

=== July 30: Return flight to Rome ===
On his return flight to Rome on July 30, 2022, Pope Francis was asked whether he would use the word 'genocide' to describe what happened in the residential school system. He responded, "It's true, I didn't use the word because it didn't occur to me, but I described the genocide and asked for pardon, forgiveness for this work that is genocidal. For example, I condemned this too: Taking away children and changing culture, changing mentalities, changing traditions, changing a race, let's say, a whole culture. Yes, it's a technical word, genocide, but I didn't use it because it didn't come to mind, but I described it. It is true; yes, it’s genocide. Yes, you all, be calm. You can say that I said that, yes, that it was genocide."

== Reactions ==
Following the papal apology in Maskwacis on July 25, Governor General Mary Simon said, "Today was a day that moved us forward, giving Survivors words that may help them heal. Yet it is also a day that can raise complex emotions, especially as the Papal visit continues". Prime Minister Justin Trudeau said that the gathering at Maskwacîs would not have been possible "without the courage, advocacy, and perseverance of First Nations, Inuit, and Métis Survivors who recounted their painful memories and shared their experiences".

The Pope's apology in Maskwacis drew mixed reactions from residential school survivors, politicians, and Indigenous leaders. The apology was criticized for not directly mentioning the sexual abuse experienced by school victims, and not addressing the role of the Catholic Church as an institution, instead mentioning the "evil" committed by Christians. In an interview with The Canadian Press, Canadian Crown-Indigenous Relations Minister Marc Miller said the "gaps" in the pontiff's apology could not be ignored. He said that the Truth and Reconciliation Commission of Canada clearly called for a papal apology to be similar to the 2010 apology the Vatican gave in response to sexual abuse cases in Ireland involving the Catholic Church. That apology, delivered by Pope Benedict XVI through a letter, directly referred to the sexual abuses suffered by Irish children and the role played by the Catholic Church, which, according to Miller, contrasts with Pope Francis' apology. Indigenous lawyer, activist and professor Pamela Palmater opined in similar fashion: "His failure to acknowledge the church’s role — both at the individual level and as an institution and governing body — not only deflects responsibility, but also serves to put more children at risk." She said "...the Pope has so far refused to officially rescind, repeal and/or repudiate the [Discovery] doctrine. This is despite the fact that he has also acknowledged that this doctrine has been incorporated into various legal systems."

== Aftermath ==
On March 30, 2023, the Vatican's Dicasteries for Culture and Education and for Promoting Integral Human Development jointly repudiated the doctrine of discovery as "not part of the teaching of the Catholic Church". The Vatican's statement pointed to the 1537 papal bull, Sublimis Deus, which affirmed the liberty and property rights of indigenous peoples and prohibited their enslavement.

== See also ==
- Canada–Holy See relations
- Catholic Church in Canada
