= Émile-Joseph Legal =

Canadian Roman Catholic cleric (1849–1920)

- Archbishop of Edmonton, Alberta
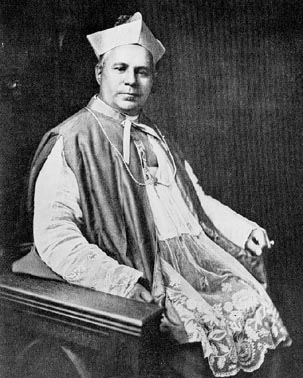
- See: Edmonton
- Installed: June 3, 1902
- Term ended: March 10, 1920
- Predecessor: Vital-Justin Grandin
- Successor: Henry Joseph O'Leary
- Other posts: Coadjutor Bishop of Saint Albert, Alberta

Orders
- Ordination: June 29, 1874

Personal details
- Born: October 9, 1849 Saint-Jean-de-Boiseau, France
- Died: March 10, 1920 (aged 70) Edmonton, Alberta

Émile-Joseph Legal (October 9, 1849 – March 10, 1920) was born in France and went to Lachine, Quebec, where he was ordained a Roman Catholic priest in the Missionary Oblates of Mary Immaculate order in 1880.

Legal worked briefly in the United States where he studied to acquire a knowledge of English. He was sent as a missionary to the Canadian northwest in 1881. He arrived at St. Albert, North-West Territories (NWT), and was sent to carry out missionary work with the Northern Peigan Blackfoot people as well as pastoral duties in Fort Macleod, NWT, to take over from Father Constantine Scollen, who had established the first mission to the Blackfoot people of the southern North-West Territory in 1873, along with Father Leon Doucet, near Calgary, NWT.

He was made a bishop in 1897 and bishop of St. Albert in 1902 on the death of Bishop Vital-Justin Grandin. In 1905, the province of Alberta was created out of the NWT, and in 1912 the Roman Catholic Archdiocese of Edmonton was created, with Legal made archbishop on the 30th of November.

The town of Legal, Alberta, is named in his honour.
