= Archdiocese of Edmonton =

Catholic ecclesiastical territory

Coordinates: 53°32′26″N 113°30′59″W

Archdiocese of Edmonton Archidioecesis Edmontonensis
- Coat of arms

Location
- Country: Canada
- Ecclesiastical province: Edmonton

Statistics
- Area: 81,151 km^{2} (31,333 sq mi)
- Population: Total; Catholics: 1,981,575; 495,393 (25%)
- Parishes: 116
- Schools: 10

Information
- Denomination: Catholic
- Sui iuris church: Latin Church
- Rite: Roman Rite
- Established: 1912-11-30
- Cathedral: St. Joseph's Basilica
- Secular priests: 70

Current leadership
- Pope: Leo XIV
- Archbishop: Stephen Andrew Hero

Map

Website
- caedm.ca

The Archdiocese of Edmonton (Latin: Archidioecesis Edmontonensis) is a Latin Church ecclesiastical territory or archdiocese in the Canadian civil province of Alberta and the seat of its metropolitan archbishop is at St. Joseph Cathedral, a minor basilica in Edmonton. The Metropolitan Archdiocese of Edmonton is the metropolitan see of its ecclesiastical province, which also contains two suffragan dioceses: the Dioceses of Calgary and Saint Paul in Alberta.

From 2007 to 2025, Bishop Richard W. Smith served as the Metropolitan Archbishop of Edmonton, having been appointed by Pope Benedict XVI. On Saturday, July 14, 2012, an official news release from Vatican Information Service (VIS), an arm of the Holy See Press Office, stated that Pope Benedict XVI had appointed Gregory Bittman, who until then had been serving as the Judicial Vicar and as Archdiocesan Chancellor, as an Auxiliary Bishop of the Metropolitan Archdiocese of Edmonton and Titular Bishop of Caltadria. On February 6, 2018, Pope Francis appointed him the seventh Bishop of the Diocese of Nelson in southeastern British Columbia. He left the Metropolitan Archdiocese of Edmonton and took possession of the Diocese of Nelson on April 25 that same year. Archbishop Smith was appointed Metropolitan Archbishop of Vancouver on February 25, 2025. On November 21, 2025, Pope Leo XIV announced the appointment of Stephen A. Hero as the eighth Metropolitan Archbishop of Edmonton. Hero will be installed as metropolitan archbishop on January 23, 2026 at St. Joseph's Basilica.

== Ecclesiastical province ==
The Ecclesiastical province has the following suffragan sees:

- Diocese of Calgary
- Diocese of Saint Paul in Alberta

== History ==
Established on 22 September 1871 as the Diocese of St Albert (Latin Sancti Alberti), on territory split off from the then Diocese of Saint-Boniface, to which it lost territory again in 1889 (meanwhile Metropolitan Archdiocese of Saint-Boniface)

Promoted on 1912.11.30 as Metropolitan Archdiocese of Edmonton / Edmontonen(sis) (Latin), having lost territory to establish the Roman Catholic Diocese of Calgary as its first suffragan.

Lost territory again on 1948.07.17 to establish the Roman Catholic Diocese of Saint Paul, Alberta, which became its second suffragan.

It enjoyed a Papal visit from Pope John Paul II in September 1984.

The Archdiocese of Edmonton was later criticized for its handling of sex abuse allegations against Rev. Patrick O'Neill and was sued by one of O'Neil's alleged victims in 2012.

From 28 March to 1 April 2022, a delegation of 32 Indigenous Elders, knowledge keepers, residential school survivors, and youth – as well as support staff – journeyed together from across the country to meet with Pope Francis, accompanied by a small group of Canadian Bishops. Metis, Inuit and First Nations delegations met with the Pope over three days. The delegation was supported by Archbishop Richard Smith on the Archdiocese of Edmonton's behalf.

Their visit to Rome concluded in a final audience with Pope Francis on 1 April with all three Indigenous groups. At that time, the Pope made an historic apology for the Church's role in the residential school system, and promised to come to Canada to apologize on Canadian soil. During that encounter, Pope Francis said he was very sorry during his Final Audience with all the Indigenous delegates:

"I also feel shame … sorrow and shame for the role that a number of Catholics, particularly those with educational responsibilities, have had in all these things that wounded you, and the abuses you suffered and the lack of respect shown for your identity, your culture and even your spiritual values. For the deplorable conduct of these members of the Catholic Church, I ask for God's forgiveness and I want to say to you with all my heart, I am very sorry. And I join my brothers, the Canadian bishops, in asking your pardon."

His Holiness said it was his hope to visit Canada "soon" and possibly "in the days" around the Feast of St. Anne, which is on 26 July. This date was chosen by Pope Francis because the Lac Ste Anne Pilgrimage has been a traditional place of gathering for Indigenous peoples, and is also the largest annual Catholic gathering in Western Canada. First called Wakamne or God's Lake by the Alexis Nakota Sioux Nation who live on the west end of the Lake, and Manito Sahkahigan or Spirit Lake by the Cree, Lac Ste Anne, about 75 km northwest of Edmonton, is the site of the annual pilgrimage, one of the most unique and memorable spiritual gatherings in North America. This choice thus demonstrated Pope Francis' intent to help reconcile indigenous and settler populations, respecting both cultures simultaneously.

Pope Francis then visited sites across the Archdiocese of Edmonton:

- Sunday, 24 July 2022: Arrival and welcome at Edmonton International Airport
- Monday, 25 July 2022: Meeting with indigenous peoples: First nations, Métis and Inuit at Maskwacis, and meeting with indigenous peoples and members of the Parish Community of Sacred Heart at Edmonton
- Tuesday, 26 July 2022: Holy Papal Mass at Commonwealth Stadium in Edmonton and participation in the Lac Ste. Anne Pilgrimage and Liturgy of the Word at the Lac Ste. Anne

In August 2023, a former student of St. Mary's Salesian Junior High School, Stephen Bounds, filed a lawsuit claiming he was groomed and sexually assaulted as a 12-year-old by a teacher, Marc Desjardins, in the 1980s. Bounds says he asked for "protection" from the school's acting principal, Father Stephen Whelan, who instead "chastised" Bounds for making the allegation of assault. Whelan himself had previously been accused of sexual abuse when he was vice-principal of a California Salesian high school in the 1970s. A year later, three other men came forward with allegations of sexual abuse at the school.

== Diocesan episcopate ==
(all Roman rite)

=== Suffragan bishops ===
- Vital-Justin Grandin, Missionary Oblates of Mary Immaculate (O.M.I.) (1871.09.22 – death 1902.06.03), previously Titular Bishop of Satala (1857.12.11 – 1871.09.22) as Coadjutor Bishop of Saint-Boniface (1857.12.11 – 1871.09.22)
- Émile-Joseph Legal, O.M.I. (1902.06.03 – see promoted 1912.11.30 see below), succeeding as previous Coadjutor Bishop of Saint Albert (1897.03.29 – 1902.06.03) and Titular Bishop of Pogla (1897.03.29 – 1902.06.03)

=== Metropolitan archbishops ===
- Émile-Joseph Legal, O.M.I. (see above 1912.11.30 – death 1920.03.10)
- Henry Joseph O'Leary, (1920.09.07 – death 1938.03.05), previously Bishop of Charlottetown (1913.01.29 – 1920.09.07)
- John Hugh MacDonald, (1938.03.05 – retired 1964.08.11), previously; later Bishop of Victoria 1934.08.11 – 1936.12.16) and Titular Archbishop of Mocissus (1936.12.16 – 1938.03.05) as Coadjutor Archbishop of Edmonton (1936.12.16 – succession 1938.03.05); emeritate as Titular Archbishop of Mediana (1964.08.11 – death 1965.01.17)
- Anthony Jordan, O.M.I. (1964.08.11 – retired 1973.07.02), previously Titular Bishop of Vada (1945.06.22 – 1955.04.27) as Apostolic Vicar of Prince Rupert (1945.06.22 – 1955.04.27), then Titular Archbishop of Silyum (1955.04.27 – 1964.08.11) as Coadjutor Archbishop of Edmonton (1955.04.27 – succession 1964.08.11); died 1982
- Joseph MacNeil, (1973.07.02 – retired 1999.06.07), also President of Canadian Conference of Catholic Bishops (1979 – 1981); previously Bishop of Saint John, New Brunswick (1969.04.09 – 1973.07.02)
- Thomas Collins (1999.06.07 – 2006.12.16), also Apostolic Administrator of suffragan Saint Paul (Canada) (2001.03.16 – 2001.09.08); previously Coadjutor Bishop of Saint-Paul (1997.03.25 – 1997.06.30) succeeding as Bishop of Saint-Paul (Canada) (1997.06.30 – 1999.02.18), Coadjutor Archbishop of Edmonton (1999.02.18 – 1999.06.07); later Archbishop of Toronto (Ontario, Canada) (2006.12.16 – 2023.02.11), created Cardinal-Priest of S. Patrizio (2012.02.18 [2012.10.23] – ...), Member of Commission of Cardinals overseeing the Institute for Works of Religion (2014.01.15 – ...)
- Richard William Smith (2007.03.22 – 2025.02.25), previously Bishop of Pembroke (2002.04.27 – 2007.03.22), later Archbishop of Vancouver (2025.02.25 – ...)
- Stephen Andrew Hero (2025.11.21 - ...), previously Bishop of Prince Albert (2021 – 2025)

=== Coadjutor bishops ===
- John Hugh MacDonald (1936-1938)
- Thomas Collins (1999), future cardinal

=== Auxiliary bishops ===
- Gregory John Bittman (2012-2018), later appointed Bishop of Nelson, British Columbia

=== Other priests of this diocese who became bishops ===
- James Charles McGuigan, appointed Archbishop of Regina in 1930; future Cardinal
- Charles Leo Nelligan, appointed Bishop of Pembroke, Ontario in 1937
- Edward Quentin Jennings, appointed Auxiliary Bishop of Vancouver, British Columbia in 1941
- Michael Cornelius O'Neill, appointed Archbishop of Regina in 1947
- Wilfrid Emmett Doyle, appointed Bishop of Nelson, British Columbia in 1958
- Paul Terrio, appointed Bishop of Saint Paul in Alberta in 2012
- Stephen Andrew Hero, appointed Bishop of Prince Albert in 2021

== Statistics and extent ==
The archdiocese (not including its suffragan dioceses) covers Central Alberta, Edmonton Capital Region and the middle and upper half of the Alberta's Rockies region. The Archdiocese includes the greater Edmonton area but also covers a geographic region stretching from the Rocky Mountains in the west to the Saskatchewan boundary in the east, from Olds in the south to Grande Cache in the north.

It acknowledges that the Archdiocese is situated on traditional lands, parts of which are within Treaty 6, Treaty 7 and Treaty 8 territories of the Alexander First Nation (Cree), Alexis Nakota Sioux Nation (Stoney), Enoch Cree Nation (Cree), Ermineskin Cree Nation (Cree), Louis Bull Tribe (Cree), Montana First Nation (Cree), O’Chiese First Nation (Western Ojibwa), Paul First Nation (Cree/Stoney), Samson Cree Nation (Cree), and Sunchild First Nation (Cree). Mass is celebrated in at least 16 different languages, including Cree, French, Spanish, Polish, Chinese, Croatian, Portuguese, Vietnamese, Italian, Hungarian, Korean, Latin, Sudanese, and American Sign Language.

As of 2020, it pastorally served 436,792 Catholics (26.4% of 1,899,097 total) on 150,000 km² in 122 parishes and missions with 126 priests, 40 permanent deacons, 163 religious sisters, 8 religious brothers, 5 members of lay institutes, 15 lay missionaries and 12 seminarians.

=== Edmonton parishes ===
- Annunciation
- Assumption
- Corpus Christi
- Good Shepherd
- Holy Rosary (Polish)
- Mary Help of Christians (Chinese)
- Nativity of Mary (Croatian)
- Our Lady of Fatima (Portuguese)
- Our Lady of Good Help, Maronite Catholic Community
- Our Lady of Guadalupe (Spanish)
- Our Lady of Loretto (Military)
- Our Lady Queen of Poland (Polish)
- Queen of Martyrs (Vietnamese)
- Resurrection
- Sacred Heart Church of the First Peoples
- St. Agnes
- St. Alphonsa (Syro-Malabar Rite)
- St. Alphonsus
- St. Andrew
- St. Angela Merici (merged with St. Edmund in June 2013)
- St. Anne (French) (merged with St. Joachim in October 2014)
- St. Anthony
- St. Benedict Chapel
- St. Charles
- St. Clare
- St. Dominic Savio
- St. Edmund
- St. Emeric (Hungarian)
- St. Joachim (French)
- St. John Bosco
- St. John the Evangelist
- St. Joseph's Basilica
- St. Joseph's College Chapel
- St. Jung Ha Sang (Korean)
- Santa Maria Goretti (Italian)
- St. Mark's Catholic Community of the Deaf
- St. Matthew
- St. Theresa
- St. Thomas d'Aquin
- St. Thomas More
- Vital Grandin Chaplaincy (Latin Mass)

=== Rural parishes ===
Alberta Beach

- Lac Ste. Anne

Bashaw

- Immaculate Heart of Mary

Beaumont

- St. Vital

Camrose

- St. Francis Xavier

Devon

- St. Maria Goretti

Drayton Valley

- St. Anthony

Edson

- Sacred Heart

Enoch

- Our Lady of Mercy
- St. Alexander Mission

Evansburg

- St. Elizabeth

Fort Saskatchewan

- Our Lady of the Angels

Gibbons

- Sacred Heart

Grande Cache

- Holy Cross

Hinton

- Our Lady of the Foothills

Innisfail

- Our Lady of Peace

Jasper

- Our Lady of Lourdes

Killam

- Killiam-Daysland-Heisler

Lacombe

- St. Stephen

Leduc

- St. Michael

Lloydminster

- St. Anthony

Ma-Me-O-Beach

- St. Theresa

Maskwacis

- Our Lady of Seven Sorrows

Mayerthorpe

- St. Agnes

Onoway

- St. Rose of Lima

Olds

- St. Stephen

Ponoka

- St. Augustine

Provost

- St. Mary

Red Deer

- Sacred Heart
- St. Mary's

Rocky Mountain House

- St. Matthew

Rimbey

- St. Margaret

St. Albert

- Holy Family
- St. Albert Francophone Community
- St. Albert
- St. Peter, Villeneuve

Stettler

- Christ - King

Spruce Grove

- Holy Trinity

Sherwood Park

- Our Lady of Perpetual Help

Sylvan Lake

- Our Lady of the Assumption

Thorsby

- Our Lady of Victory

Trochu

- St. Anne of the Prairies

Wetaskiwin

- Sacred Heart

Wainwright

- Blessed Sacrament

Vermilion

- Holy Name of Jesus

Vegreville

- St. Martin of Tours

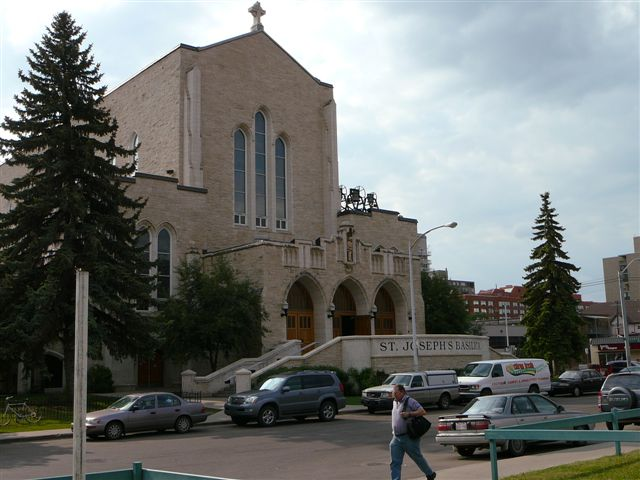
Saint Joseph's Basilica, Edmonton

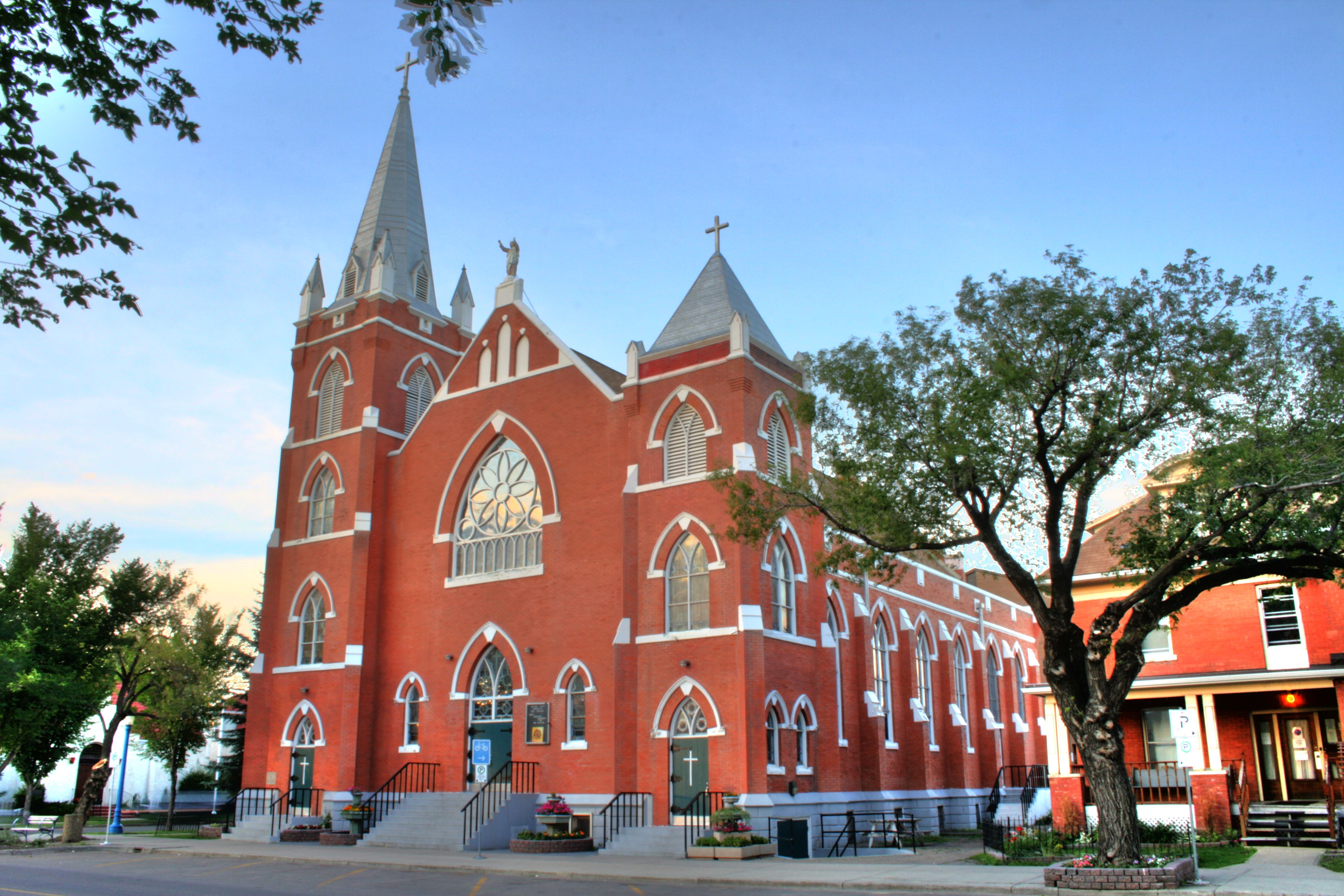
Sacred Heart Church, Edmonton

== Education ==
The following school districts operate Catholic schools within the boundaries of the Archdiocese:

- Conseil scolaire Centre-Nord (francophone)
- East Central Alberta Catholic Schools
- Edmonton Catholic Schools
- Evergreen Catholic Schools
- Elk Island Catholic Schools
- Greater St. Albert Catholic Schools
- Living Waters Catholic Schools
- Lloydminster Catholic Schools
- Red Deer Catholic Regional Schools
- St. Thomas Aquinas Catholic Schools

== Archdiocesan Media ==
The Western Catholic Reporter was a weekly newspaper published in Edmonton, Alberta, Canada that covered the Catholic religion.

The newspaper was owned by the Catholic Archdiocese of Edmonton after it took over operations in October 2013. Its declared mission was to serve its readers by helping them deepen their faith through accurate information and reflective commentary on events and issues of concern to the Church.

The Western Catholic Reporter closed with its last print publication on September 26, 2016, and was replaced in October 2017 by Grandin Media which ran a website and social media on Facebook, Instagram, and YouTube. Grandin Media ended in Spring 2021 shortly after the archdiocese restructured through the "Radical Rethink," which also coincidentally occurred shortly after the renaming of Grandin landmarks such as schools and neighbourhoods in the region. The website with archived media was shut down in early 2024. All stories from the Grandin Media website were then transferred on to the archdiocesan website, .

After the Radical Rethink, the archdiocese launched an email newsletter called The Window with its first publication on September 22, 2021. In addition to a free email subscription, it is also distributed to those without email through Flocknote by SMS text messaging. These weekly editions of The Window current and backdated can be found on the archdiocesan website.

== Sources and external links ==
- The Catholic Archdiocese of Edmonton home page
- Gcatholic with Google map and - satellite photo
- Archdiocese of Edmonton page at catholichierarchy.org retrieved July 13, 2006
- Western Catholic Reporter
- Grandin Media
