= Vital-Justin Grandin =

Catholic bishop

Venerable Vital-Justin Grandin OMI
- Bishop of St. Albert
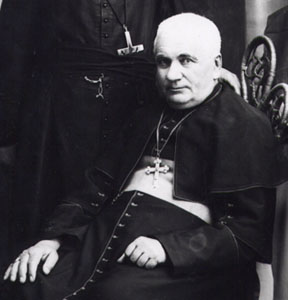
- Vital-Justin Grandin, c. 1900
- Diocese: Diocese of St. Albert
- In office: 1871–1902
- Successor: Émile-Joseph Legal
- Other post: Bishop of Satala (titular)

Orders
- Ordination: 1854 (priest)
- Consecration: 1859

Personal details
- Born: 8 February 1829 Saint-Pierre-sur-Orthe, France
- Died: 3 June 1902 (aged 73) St. Albert, Alberta, Canada
- Denomination: Roman Catholic

Vital-Justin Grandin (8 February 1829 – 3 June 1902) was a Roman Catholic priest and bishop. He has been labelled as a key architect of the Canadian Indian residential school system by contemporary news sources, which has been considered an instrument of cultural genocide. In June 2021, this led to governments and private businesses to begin removing his name from institutions and infrastructure previously named for him. He served the Church in the western parts of what is now Canada both before and after Confederation. He is also the namesake or co-founder of various small communities and neighbourhoods in what is now Alberta, Canada, especially those of francophone residents.

== Early life ==
Grandin was born in Saint-Pierre-sur-Orthe, France, on 8 February 1829. He was the ninth son in a family of fourteen children of Jean Grandin and Marie Veillard. He joined the Missionary Oblates of Mary Immaculate in 1851 and was ordained a priest in 1854; one month later he was sent to Canada to perform missionary work in what was then Rupert's Land. Upon arrival he was sent to Saint-Boniface, where Bishop Alexandre-Antonin Taché was in charge. Having received no specialized preparation in the seminary for work among native populations, he had to develop linguistic skills in the field. Grandin was subsequently assigned to a mission at Fort Chipewyan (now in Alberta). He next served at Île-à-la-Crosse (now in Saskatchewan) for a number of years.

== Bishop ==
On 11 December 1857 Pope Pius IX named Grandin Taché's coadjutor and titular bishop of Satala. He continued to reside at Île-à-la-Crosse. When Taché suggested creating a new vicariate in the Mackenzie River basin, Grandin made an extensive tour of the missions in the area, and worked on the logistics of supply. " Despite having the support of northern missionaries Grandin, characteristically timid and hesitant, presented objections to his candidacy." He recommended Henri Faraud instead. In May 1862, Faraud was made apostolic vicar of the newly created Vicariate Athabasca-Mackenzie.

In 1867, Taché proposed that the vicariate of Saskatchewan be formed with Grandin as vicar of missions. That took place in 1868, and the same year, Taché and Grandin attended the council of Quebec bishops to discuss new religious boundaries in the Canadian northwest. As a result of those discussions, in 1871 St. Boniface was elevated to an archdiocese. The suffragan Diocese of St Albert was created from territory split off from Saint Boniface, and Grandin was appointed its first bishop.

Grandin was an early supporter of the Canadian Indian residential school system and believed that Indigenous Peoples faced extinction and that the best way for them "to become civilized" and to avoid destruction was to educate the young with the "consent of their parents." In 1880 he wrote a letter to then Public Works Minister Hector-Louis Langevin explaining that boarding schools were the best way to ensure children "forget the customs, habits & language of their ancestors".

The 2015 Report of the Truth and Reconciliation Commission of Canada states that he had "led the campaign for residential schooling" and that he was convinced that parents would willingly give their children to boarding schools. He wrote, "The poor Indians wish nothing more than the happiness of their children. They foresee well enough the future which awaits them and often beg of us to take them so that we can prepare them for a better prospect." In a letter to Canada's first prime minister, John A. Macdonald, Grandin stressed the "success" that had been achieved at the missionary boarding schools, and reported, “The children whom we have brought up are no longer Indians & at the time of leaving our Establishments, the boys at least, do not wish to receive even the ordinary grants made to Indians, they wish to live like the whites and they are able to do so." He proposed for the government to "make a trial of letting us have children of five years old and leaving them in our Orphan Asylums & Industrial schools until the time of their marriage or the age of 21 years." For that cause, he made the trip to the nation's capital city, Ottawa, to lobby the government and upper echelons of the Catholic bureaucracy directly. His efforts were later described by commentators in 2021 as an implementation of cultural genocide.

Grandin was never completely healthy; he had been a sickly child and also had a speech impediment, and his health deteriorated during his later years. He also presided over the development and expansion of the Diocese of St. Albert, including the founding of new missions and churches throughout Alberta and the construction of hospitals and schools, which, unusually for the time, were administered by members of female religious orders and lay clergy. Grandin's efforts to increase francophone settlement in Alberta were less successful, but many francophone communities founded at the behest of Grandin (such as Beaumont, Lacombe, and Morinville) still exist in central and northern Alberta.

== Death and legacy ==
Grandin died in office on 3 June 1902. He was succeeded by Bishop Émile-Joseph Legal in the Diocese of St. Albert.

Grandin's spiritual writings were approved by theologians on 20 November 1935, and the cause for his beatification was formally opened on 24 February 1937, granting him the title of Servant of God. He was declared venerable by the Roman Catholic Church in 1966.

Many institutions were named for Grandin during the 20th century, including Edmonton-area businesses, schools, and city infrastructure. That included public murals painted in homage of him, as late as 1989, which were one of the first items related to Grandin to come under scrutiny in 2011, when an Indigenous working group in Edmonton found the mural glorified residential schooling "and of all the horrors of the cultural genocide that entailed." In June 2021, after the discovery of possible unmarked graves of Indigenous children on the grounds of a former residential school site in Kamloops, British Columbia, Edmonton and St. Albert city officials, as well as private businesses, began removing his name in reaction to a strengthening public condemnation of his role in creating the Indigenous residential school system. Similar pushes to remove his name also occurred in other cities, including the Canadian cities of Winnipeg and Calgary, as well as smaller communities like South Indian Lake, Manitoba.

=== Buildings and businesses from which Grandin name has been removed ===
- 9 June 2021: The city of Edmonton votes to rename the Grandin LRT station and remove a mural of Grandin displayed in the station.
- 15 June 2021: Grandin Fish 'n' Chips restaurant renames to Prairie Fish 'n' Chips
- 28 June 2021: Edmonton Catholic Schools votes to rename Grandin School and remove a mural depicting Bishop Grandin on an exterior wall of the school
- 28 June 2021: Calgary Catholic School District votes to rename Bishop Grandin High School to Haysboro Catholic High School
- 28 June 2021: In a Special Public Meeting, Greater St. Albert Catholic Schools' unanimously approved a motion to change the name of Vital Grandin Catholic Elementary School by 30 September 2021. Signage was removed from the school building immediately following the decision.
- 27 October 2022: Calgary Catholic School District confirms final name change of Bishop Grandin High School to Our Lady of the Rockies High School.
- 13 March 2023: Winnipeg announced it would review name changes for streets within its city limits, with Bishop Grandin Boulevard becoming Abinojii Mikanah, Bishop Grandin Trail becoming Awasisak Mēskanow, and Grandin Street becoming Taapweewin Way.
- 18 March 2025: The city council of St. Albert votes in favour of renaming the city's Grandin neighbourhood to "The Gardens".
- 4 September 2025: St. Albert renames their Grandin neighbourhood to The Gardens, and renaming local features like Grandin Road to Garden Road

== See also ==
- Roman Catholic Archdiocese of Edmonton
- Truth and Reconciliation Commission of Canada
