= Albert Privet Thévenot =

Canadian Roman Catholic prelate (1945–2025)

His Excellency Albert Privet Thévenot
- Bishop Emeritus of Prince Albert
- Archdiocese: Regina
- Diocese: Prince Albert
- Appointed: 26 May 2008
- Term ended: 25 March 2021
- Predecessor: Blaise-Ernest Morand
- Successor: Stephen Hero

Orders
- Ordination: 2 August 1980
- Consecration: 6 August 2008 by Luigi Ventura

Personal details
- Born: 6 November 1945 Treherne, Manitoba, Canada
- Died: 13 April 2025 (aged 79) Prince Albert, Saskatchewan, Canada
- Motto: Ut vitam habeant
- Coat of arms: Albert Privet Thévenot's coat of arms

Styles of Albert Privet Thévenot
- Reference style: His Excellency; The Most Reverend
- Spoken style: Your Excellency
- Religious style: Bishop

Albert Privet Thévenot (English: /ˈælbərt priːˈveɪ ˈtɛvənoʊ/, French: [albɛʁ pʁivɛ tevəno]; 6 November 1945 – 13 April 2025) was a Canadian Roman Catholic prelate. He was bishop of Prince Albert from 2008 to 2021. Thévenot died in Prince Albert on 13 April 2025, at the age of 79.

Catholic Church titles
Preceded by Blaise-Ernest Morand	Bishop of Pronce Albert; 2008–2021	Succeeded by Stephen Hero
