= Pogla =

Ancient city in Pisidia

Coordinates: 37°17′55″N 30°14′55″E

Pogla was a town in the late Roman province of Pamphylia Secunda. Its bishopric, which was a suffragan of Perge, is included in the Catholic Church's list of titular sees.

== History ==
Pogla is mentioned by Ptolemy, and possibly by Hierocles, where he speaks of a town called Socla (Σώκλα) in Pamphylia, perhaps a manuscript corruption. The town's name after antiquity came to be Fugla, and was then changed to Çomaklı in the modern period.

Coins of Pogla of the 2nd and 3rd centuries are extant, bearing on the obverse images of emperors, and on the reverse divinities such as Artemis with the inscription ΠΟΓΛΕΩΝ (of the Pogleans).

== Bishops ==
Le Quien mentions two bishops: Paul, present at the Council of Chalcedon (451) and Nicephorus at the Council of Nicæa (787). The Notitiae Episcopatuum continue to mention the see among the suffragans of Perge as late as the 13th century.
