= Bethlehem Chapel (Saint-Jean-de-Boiseau) =

Chapel in Loire-Atlantique, France

- Chapelle de Bethléem
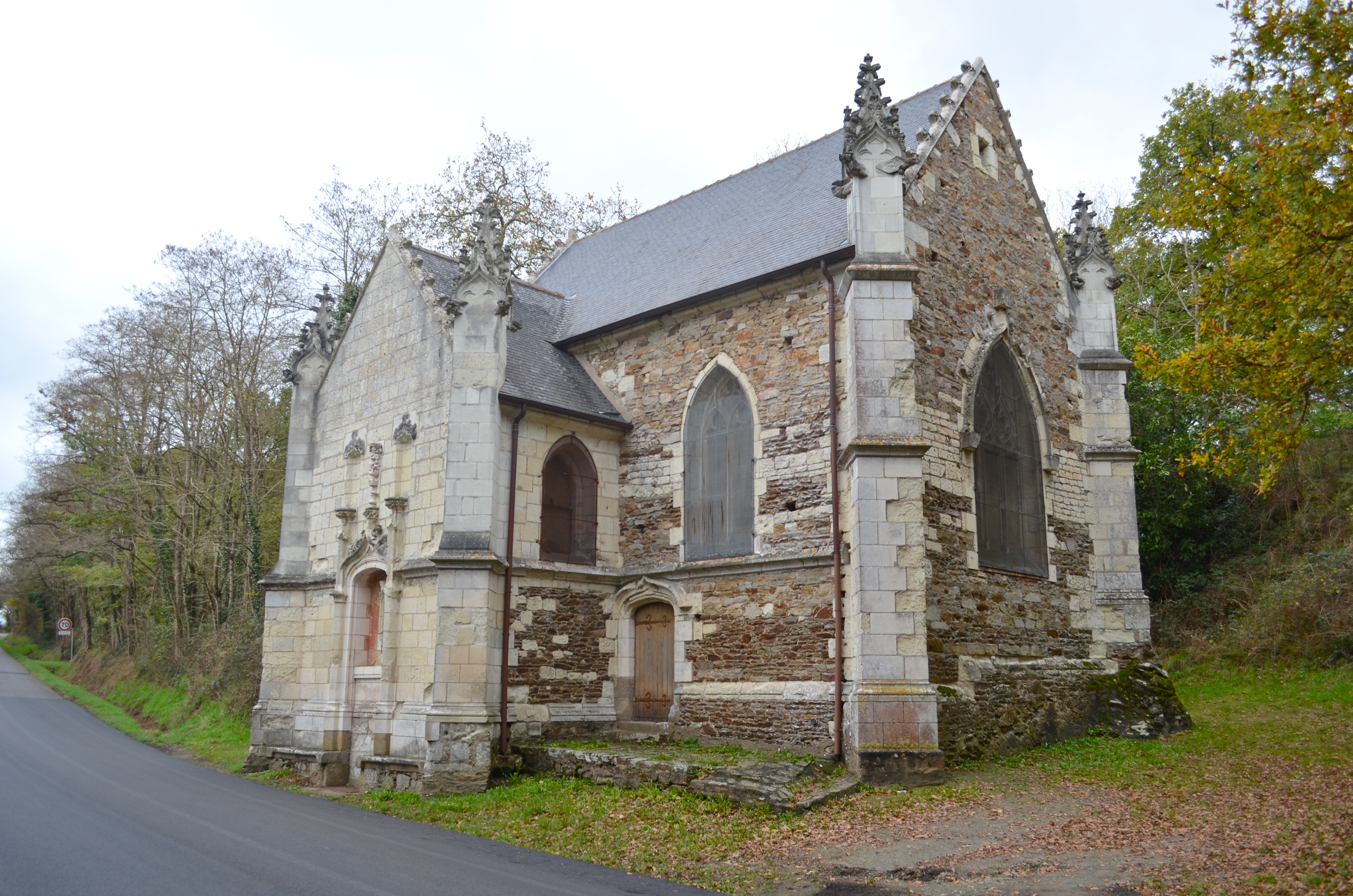
- The front entrance door
- Interactive map of Bethlehem Chapel
- Location: Loire-Atlantique, France
- Coordinates: 47.19547°N 1.73166°W
- Type: Chapel

Bethlehem Chapel (French: chapelle de Bethléem) is a Roman Catholic chapel, located in the French community of Saint-Jean-de-Boiseau in Loire-Atlantique, beside district road 58, between Saint-Jean-de-Boiseau and Le Pellerin.

Classified as a historic monument in 1911, restored from 1993 to 1995, the chapel has pinnacles where certain newly created chimeras resemble products of American film culture and Japanese animation.

== History ==
The sacred origins of the place surround a spring, close to which the Druids held Beltane ceremonies in order to celebrate fertility. In the Middle Ages, Christianity replaced the Druids and established Notre-Dame de Bethléem (Our Lady of Bethlehem). However, the sculptures on the west opening are directly from the Druidic cult.

The chapel has been classified as a historic monument since August 30, 1911.

=== Restoration of the pinnacles ===
During the restoration of the chapel from 1993 to 1995, the question arose about how to replace the missing pinnacles at the corners of the building. The only sources available, a drawing and a note from the Archaeological Society of Loire-Atlantique, date from the nineteenth century and details are not allowed to be revealed. The French architect, Gwénolé Congard, asked the sculptor Jean-Louis Boistel to recreate these pinnacles, including the 28 chimeras that adorn the corners.

Each chimera was created based on the symbolic meaning behind each pinnacle. Jean-Louis Boistel combines ideals of mythology, Christianity and also the modern era to recreate a coherent, iconographic program.

The chimeras are as follows:

- north-west pinnacle, symbolizing the soul of man:
  - a wild boar (tracking the spiritual)
  - a centaur (conflicts between instinct and reason)
  - Sainte Anne at anchor (firmness, solidity, tranquility, fidelity),
  - Adam
- Archivolt, showing the tree of life
- west pinnacle, symbolizing the soul of woman:
  - Eve
  - a triad (Alma, Dahud and Malgwen),
  - a Siren (lust),
  - a snake (the world of fantasy and mystery)
- south-west pinnacle, symbolizing the unconscious;
  - Goldorak (righteousness, a knight of modern times)
  - A Gremlin (evil monster)
  - Gizmo (a good monster)
  - Irony (arrogance of man)
- south pinnacle, symbolizing wisdom:
  - the crazy (poetry)
  - the druid (science, wisdom and strength),
  - the Templar (guardian of the temple, and core values)
  - the contractor (knowledge and understanding);
- South-east pinnacle, of memory
  - The Angel of Saint Matthew
  - The Bull of Saint Luke
  - The Eagle of Saint John
  - The Lion of Saint Mark
- North-east pinnacle, of origins
  - a skinned man (the resurrection)
  - the old man (the ages of man and eternity)
  - Ankou (Death)
  - Leviathan (absolute nothingness, that which does not wake) depicted as a Xenomorph from the film Alien

The proposal to the council of Saint-Jean-de-Boiseau did not win unanimously, but the project was validated through the support of the town's youth. The pinnacles were completed in September 1995.

The chapel was the subject of an installation of Gino de Dominicis, D'Lo, in the festival Estuaire 2009.

== Architecture ==
The chapel is made up of a main rectangular body facing west. The archivolt to the west represents the tree of life. To the south an avant-corps is built beside the road.
