= Diocese of Prince Albert =

Latin Catholic ecclesiastical territory

Diocese of Prince Albert Dioecesis Principis Albertensis

Location
- Country: Canada
- Ecclesiastical province: Saskatchewan
- Metropolitan: Regina
- Population: 40,700 (22.1%)

Information
- Denomination: Catholic
- Rite: Roman Rite
- Established: 9 June 1933
- Cathedral: Sacred Heart Cathedral

Current leadership
- Pope: Leo XIV
- Bishop-Elect: Kenneth Reid Thorson, OMI
- Metropolitan Archbishop: Donald Bolen
- Bishops emeritus: Blaise-Ernest Morand

Website
- padiocese.ca

The Diocese of Prince-Albert (Latin: Dioecesis Principis Albertensis), in Saskatchewan, is a Latin Catholic suffragan in the western Canadian ecclesiastical province of the Metropolitan Archdiocese of Regina.

Its cathedral episcopal see is Sacred Heart Cathedral, at Prince Albert, Saskatchewan. It also has the National Shrine of the Little Flower, in Wakaw, Saskatchewan.

== History ==
- Established on 4 June 1891 as Apostolic Vicariate of Saskatchewan on territory slit off from the Metropolitan Archdiocese of Saint-Boniface.
- Promoted on 1907.12.02 as Diocese of Prince-Albert / Principis Alberten(sis) (Latin)
- Lost territory on 1910.03.04 to establish the Apostolic Vicariate of Keewatin.
- Renamed on 1921.04.30 as Diocese of Prince-Albert–Saskatoon.
- Lost territory on 1921.05.06 to establish the Territorial Abbacy of Saint Peter–Muenster.
- Renamed (back) on 1933.06.09 as Diocese of Prince-Albert, having gained territory from Apostolic Vicariate of Keewatin and lost territory to establish the Diocese of Saskatoon.

== Statistics ==
As per 2014, it pastorally served 40,800 Catholics (20.5% of 198,600 total) on 118,834 km^{2} in 80 parishes with 62 priests (47 diocesan, 15 religious), 1 deacon, 79 lay religious (15 brothers, 64 sisters) and 2 seminarians.

== Bishops ==
(all Roman Rite, often members of Latin congregations)

Apostolic Vicar of Saskatchewan

- Albert Pascal, Missionary Oblates of Mary Immaculate (O.M.I.) (1891.06.02 – 1907.12.02 see below), Titular Bishop of Mosynopolis (1891.06.02 – 1907.12.02)

Suffragan Bishop of Prince-Albert (first time)

- Albert Pascal, O.M.I. (see above 1907.12.02 – death 1920.07.12)

Suffragan Bishop of Prince-Albert–Saskatoon

- Henri-Jean-Maria Prud'homme (1921.06.16 – 1933.06.09 see below)

Suffragan Bishops of Prince-Albert (again)

- Henri-Jean-Maria Prud'homme (see above 1933.06.09 – resigned 1937.01.29), emeritate as Titular Bishop of Saldæ (1937.01.29 – death 1952.01.05)
- Réginald Duprat, Dominican order (O.P.) (1938.03.17 – retired 1952.06.29), emeritate as Titular Bishop of Tremithus (1952.06.29 – death 1954.02.13)
- Léo Blais (1952.07.04 – resigned 1959.02.28); next Titular Bishop of Hieron (1959.03.18 – death 1991.01.21), first as Auxiliary Bishop of Montréal (Quebec, Canada) (1959.03.18 – 1971.05.11), then on emeritate
- Laurent Morin (1959.02.28 – retired 1983.04.09), previously Titular Bishop of Arsamosata (1955.09.08 – 1959.02.28) as Auxiliary Bishop of Montréal (Quebec, Canada) (1955.09.08 – 1959.02.28); died 1996
- Blaise-Ernest Morand (1983.04.09 – retired 2008.05.26), succeeded as former Coadjutor Bishop of Prince-Albert (1981.04.22 – 1983.04.09)
- Albert Privet Thévenot, White Fathers (M. Afr.) (2008.05.26 – retired 2021.03.25)
- Stephen Andrew Hero (2021.03.25 – 2025.11.21), appointed, Archbishop of Edmonton, Alberta
- Kenneth Reid Thorson, O.M.I. (2026.05.28 – Present)

Coadjutor bishop

- Blaise-Ernest Morand (1981-1983)

== Sources and external links ==
- Roman Catholic Diocese of Prince Albert site
- GCatholic with Google map and - satellite photo - data for all sections
