= Stephen Andrew Hero =

Canadian Catholic archbishop (born 1969)

His Grace Stephen Andrew Hero
- Archbishop of Edmonton
- Church: Latin Church
- Appointed: 21 November 2025
- Predecessor: Richard W. Smith
- Previous post: Diocese of Prince Albert (2021–2025)

Orders
- Ordination: 29 June 2000
- Consecration: 11 June 2021 by Donald Bolen

Personal details
- Born: 19 December 1969 (age 56) Lachine, Quebec, Canada
- Coat of arms

Stephen Andrew Hero (born 19 December 1969) is a Canadian prelate of the Catholic Church. He is the Metropolitan Archbishop of Edmonton, having previously served as Bishop of Prince Albert (2021–2025).

== Early life and education ==
Hero was born on December 19, 1969, in Montreal, Quebec. He carried out his philosophical studies at the Seminary of Christ the King in Mission, British Columbia from 1991 to 1994. He then studied theology at Saint Joseph Seminary in Edmonton from 1994 to 1997, and subsequently at the Pontifical Academy of Saint Thomas Aquinas in Rome from 1997 to 2000, where he earned a licentiate in spiritual theology.

== Priesthood ==
He was ordained June 29, 2000 as a priest of the Metropolitan Archdiocese of Edmonton, Alberta, Canada. After several years of parish ministry and service as the Director of Vocations, he earned a second licentiate in liturgical studies from the Pontifical Liturgical Institute at Sant'Anselmo in 2005. Hero was appointed to the formation team at St. Joseph Seminary in Edmonton and began teaching at Newman Theological College. He served at Rector of the seminary for nine years until his nomination as Bishop of the Diocese of Prince Albert, Saskatchewan.

== Episcopal ministry ==
He was ordained Bishop on June 11, 2021, the Solemnity of the Sacred Heart of Jesus, which is the patronal feast of that diocese and its cathedral. On November 21, 2025, he was appointed Metropolitan Archbishop-Designate of the Metropolitan Archdiocese of Edmonton. He was installed as metropolitan archbishop on January 23, 2026 at St. Joseph's Basilica.

== Arms ==
Coat of arms of Stephen Andrew Hero

Notes
Granted 15 December 2021.
Escutcheon
Sable a saltire pommé throughout between in chief and in base six mullets Or and in the flanks two turtledoves respectant Argent.
Motto
Deus Solus
Badge
A Latin cross pommé Or between two turtledoves Argent one in dexter base contourné and the other perched on the sinister limb all ensigned by three mullets in chevron Or.

Catholic Church titles
Preceded by Albert Privet Thévenot	Bishop of Pronce Albert; 2021–2025	Succeeded by Kenneth Thorson
Preceded by Richard W. Smith	Archbishop of Edmonton; 2025–present	Incumbent
