= Joseph MacNeil =

Canadian Catholic prelate (1924–2018)

Joseph Neil MacNeil
- Archbishop Emeritus of Edmonton
- Church: Latin Church
- Archdiocese: Edmonton
- In office: 1973–1999
- Predecessor: Anthony Jordan
- Successor: Thomas Christopher Collins

Orders
- Ordination: May 23, 1948

Personal details
- Born: April 15, 1924; Sydney, Nova Scotia, Canada
- Died: February 11, 2018 (aged 93); Edmonton, Alberta, Canada

Joseph Neil MacNeil (April 15, 1924 – February 11, 2018) was a Canadian prelate of the Catholic Church.

MacNeil was born in Sydney, Nova Scotia, and was ordained a priest on May 23, 1948. MacNeil was appointed bishop of the Diocese of Saint John, New Brunswick, on April 9, 1969, and consecrated on June 24, 1969. MacNeil was appointed bishop of the Archdiocese of Edmonton on July 2, 1973, and served in this office until his resignation on June 7, 1999. He died after a stroke on February 11, 2018, at the age of 93.

== See also ==
- Robert Jacobson
