= Paul Terrio =

- Bishop Emeritus of Saint Paul, Alberta
- Church: Catholic Church
- Diocese: Diocese of Saint Paul, Alberta
- In office: 18 October 2012 – 15 September 2022
- Predecessor: Luc-André Bouchard
- Successor: Gary Anthony Franken

Orders
- Ordination: 23 May 1970
- Consecration: 12 December 2012 by Richard W. Smith

Personal details
- Born: 4 May 1943 (age 83) Montreal, Quebec, Dominion of Canada, British Empire
- Motto: Et Virtutem Resurrectionis Ejus
- Coat of arms

Paul Terrio (born 4 May 1943) is a Canadian prelate of the Roman Catholic Church. He currently serves as bishop emeritus of the Diocese of Saint Paul, Alberta.

== Biography ==
Terrio was born in Montreal. He was ordained a priest on 23 May 1970. He was appointed as bishop of St. Paul by Pope Benedict XVI on 18 October 2012. He received his episcopal consecration on 12 December 2012. On 1 January 2021 it was announced that he was retiring and anticipated a replacement bishop in 2021.
