= Diocese of Saint-Jérôme–Mont-Laurier =

Catholic ecclesiastical territory

Diocese of Saint-Jérôme Dioecesis Sancti Hieronymi Terraebonae
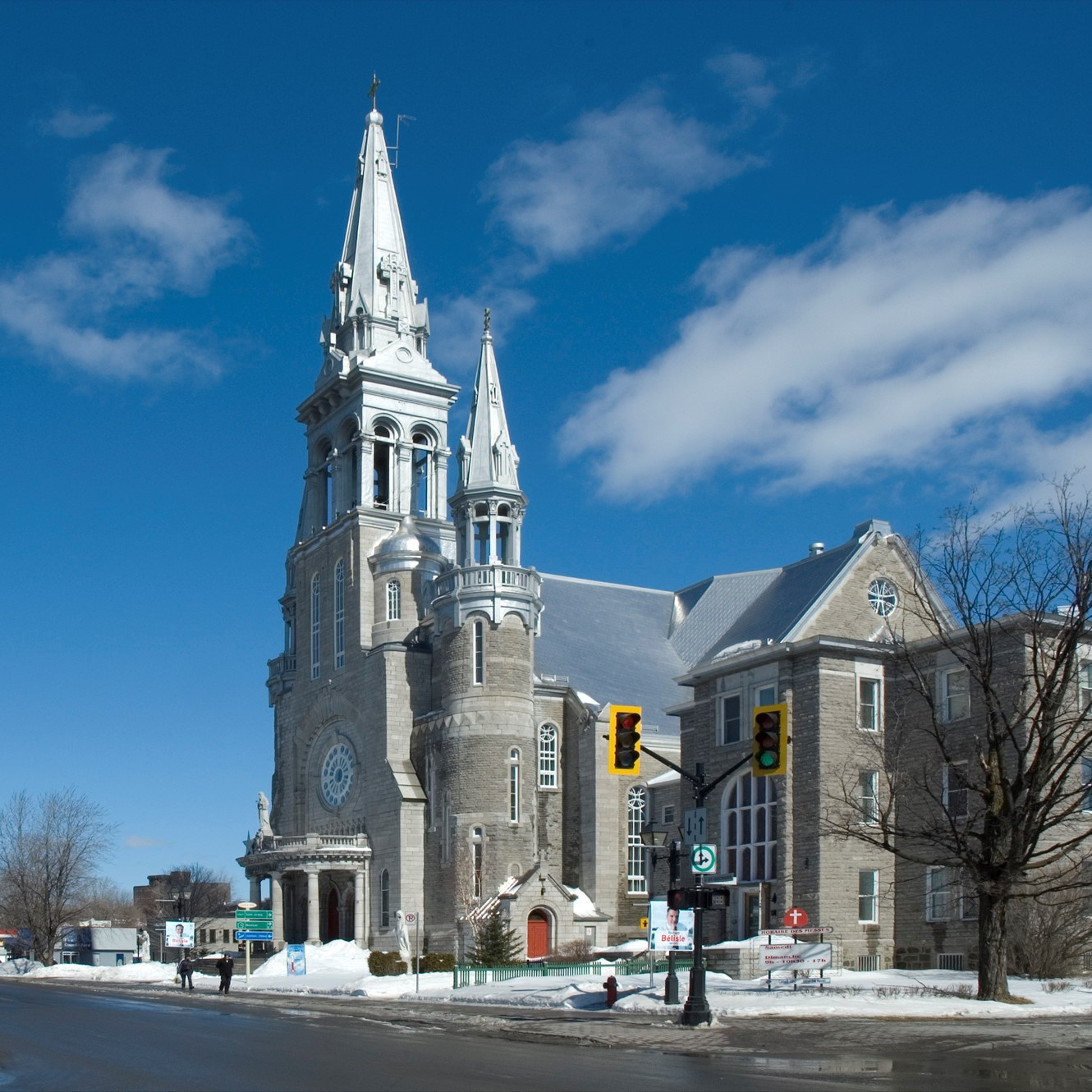

Location
- Country: Canada
- Ecclesiastical province: Archdiocese of Montreal
- Coordinates: 45°46′41″N 74°00′07″W

Statistics
- Population: Total; Catholics: 469,095; 455,952 (97.2%)
- Parishes: 35

Information
- Denomination: Roman Catholic
- Rite: Roman Rite
- Established: 23 June 1951
- Cathedral: St. Jerome's Cathedral, Saint-Jérôme
- Secular priests: 74

Current leadership
- Pope: Leo XIV
- Bishop: Raymond Poisson
- Bishops emeritus: Pierre Morissette; Gilles Cazabon, O.M.I. Donald Lapointe

Website
- ecdl.ca

The Roman Catholic Diocese of Saint-Jérôme (Latin: Dioecesis Sancti Hieronymi Terraebonae) is a Latin rite suffragan of the Archdiocese of Montréal.

Its cathedral episcopal see is Cathédrale Saint-Jérôme, dedicated to Saint Jerome (Hieronumus), in Saint-Jérôme, Quebec.

== History ==
It was erected on 23 June 1951 as Diocese of Saint-Jérôme (Latin: Sancti Hieronymi Terræbonæ), on territories split off from (its Metropolitan) the Archdiocese of Montréal, the Archdiocese of Ottawa and the Diocese of Mont-Laurier.

On 1 June 2022, the Diocese of Saint-Jérôme and the Diocese of Mont-Laurier were united to become the Diocese of Saint-Jérôme–Mont-Laurier.

== Notable bishops ==
=== Suffragan Bishops of Saint-Jérôme ===
- Charles-Omer Valois (1977.06.10 – retired 1997.01.22)
- Gilles Cazabon, O.M.I. (1997.12.27 – retired 2008.07.03) (Note: previously Bishop of Timmins (Canada) (1992.03.13 – 1997.12.27))
- Pierre Morissette (2008.07.03 – 2019.05.21) (Note: Pierre Morissette was also President of Canadian Conference of Catholic Bishops (2009.10.23 – 2011.10.18); previously Titular Bishop of Mesarfelta (1987.02.27 – 1990.03.17) as Auxiliary Bishop of Archdiocese of Montréal (Canada) (1987.02.27 – 1990.03.17), Bishop of Baie-Comeau (Canada) (1990.03.17 – 2008.07.03), Vice-President of Canadian Conference of Catholic Bishops (2007.10 – 2009.10.23).) – incumbent Bishop Emeritus
- Raymond Poisson (2019.05.21 – Present) (Note: previously as Auxiliary Bishop of Diocese of Saint-Jerome and Titular Bishop of Gegi (2012.05.01-2015.09.08) Bishop of Diocese of Joliette (2015.09.08-2018.05.18), Coadjutor Bishop of Saint-Jerome (2018.05.18-2019.05.21), Vice-President of Canadian Conference of Catholic Bishops (2019.09.28-), additionally appointed as Bishop of Diocese of Mont-Laurier (2020.06.01-).)

=== Priests of the diocese who became bishops ===
- Paul-Émile Charbonneau, appointed Auxiliary Bishop of Ottawa, Ontario in 1960
- Luc Cyr, appointed Bishop of Valleyfield, Québec in 2001

== See also ==
- List of Catholic dioceses in Canada

== Sources and external links ==
- Diocese of Saint-Jérôme–Mont-Laurier site (in French)
- GCatholic, with Google map - data for all sections

Bibliography

- "Nos évêques". Diocèse de Saint-Jérôme. Archived from the original on 28 June 2013.
- "Diocese of Saint-Jérôme". Catholic-Hierarchy.
