= Serge Poitras =

Canadian Roman Catholic bishop (born 1949)

The Most Reverend Serge Patrick Poitras
- Bishop Emeritus of Timmins
- Church: Catholic Church
- Diocese: Timmins
- Appointed: 10 November 2012
- Installed: 27 December 2012
- Term ended: 1 May 2026
- Predecessor: Paul Marchand
- Successor: Roch Martin

Orders
- Ordination: 27 May 1973 by Marius Paré
- Consecration: 27 December 2012 by Terrence Prendergast

Personal details
- Born: 27 May 1949 (age 77) Jonquière, Quebec, Canada
- Education: Université du Québec à Chicoutimi; Université Laval; Pontifical Gregorian University
- Motto: Dominus Jesus Christus
- Coat of arms

Serge Patrick Poitras (born 27 May 1949) is a Canadian Roman Catholic prelate who served as Bishop of Timmins from 2012 to 2026. He became bishop emeritus upon his retirement on 1 May 2026.

== Early life and education ==
Serge Patrick Poitras was born on 27 May 1949 in Jonquière, Quebec. He studied at the minor seminary of the Diocese of Chicoutimi from 1961 to 1967 and at its major seminary from 1968 to 1971, completing his theological studies at the Grand Séminaire de Québec from 1971 to 1973. He earned a bachelor's degree in theology from the Université du Québec à Chicoutimi in 1971 and a theology degree from Université Laval in 1973. He subsequently obtained a doctorate in theology from the Pontifical Gregorian University in Rome in 1988.

== Priesthood ==
Poitras was ordained a priest for the Diocese of Chicoutimi on 27 May 1973 by Bishop Marius Paré. He initially served as an assistant pastor at the cathedral parish of Chicoutimi. In 1980 he became a professor at the diocesan minor seminary and was responsible for pastoral ministry with students, positions he held until 1990.

From 1990 to 2000, Poitras taught at the Grand Séminaire de Montréal, where he was a member of the formation team and later director of studies from 1998 to 2000. During this period he also provided pastoral assistance in several Montreal parishes.

On 21 August 2000, he was appointed French-language secretary at the Apostolic Nunciature to Canada. In December 2010, he was appointed Adjunct Under Secretary of the Congregation for Bishops at the Holy See.

== Episcopacy ==
On 10 November 2012, Pope Benedict XVI appointed Poitras Bishop of Timmins, succeeding Paul Marchand. At the time of his appointment, he was serving as Adjunct Under Secretary of the Congregation for Bishops.

He was consecrated a bishop on 27 December 2012 at Saint Anthony of Padua Cathedral in Timmins. His principal consecrator was Archbishop Terrence Prendergast, with Archbishop Gérald Cyprien Lacroix and Bishop André Rivest serving as principal co-consecrators. His episcopal motto was Dominus Jesus Christus.

As a member of the Canadian Conference of Catholic Bishops (CCCB), Poitras served on the Episcopal Commission for Liturgy and the Sacraments in the French sector from 2014 to 2017, becoming its chairman in 2017. From 2017 to 2025 he represented the CCCB at the French-language international episcopal commission for liturgical translations. He was also involved in the formation of priests, the causes of saints in Canada, and the Episcopal Commission for Doctrine.

== Retirement ==
On 1 May 2026, Pope Leo XIV accepted Poitras's resignation from the pastoral care of the Diocese of Timmins and appointed Roch Martin as his successor. Poitras thereby became Bishop Emeritus of Timmins.
