= NCWC =

NCWC may refer to:

- National Council of Women of Canada, a Canadian advocacy organization based in Ottawa, Ontario
- North Carolina Wesleyan University, formerly North Carolina Wesleyan College, a private Methodist liberal arts college in Rocky Mount, North Carolina
- National Catholic Welfare Council, formerly the annual meeting of the American Catholic hierarchy and its standing secretariat
  - National Catholic Welfare Council Press Department, which later became the Catholic News Service
