= St. Jerome's Cathedral (Saint-Jérôme) =

Coordinates: 45.7781°N 74.0025°W

- Cathédrale de Saint-Jérôme
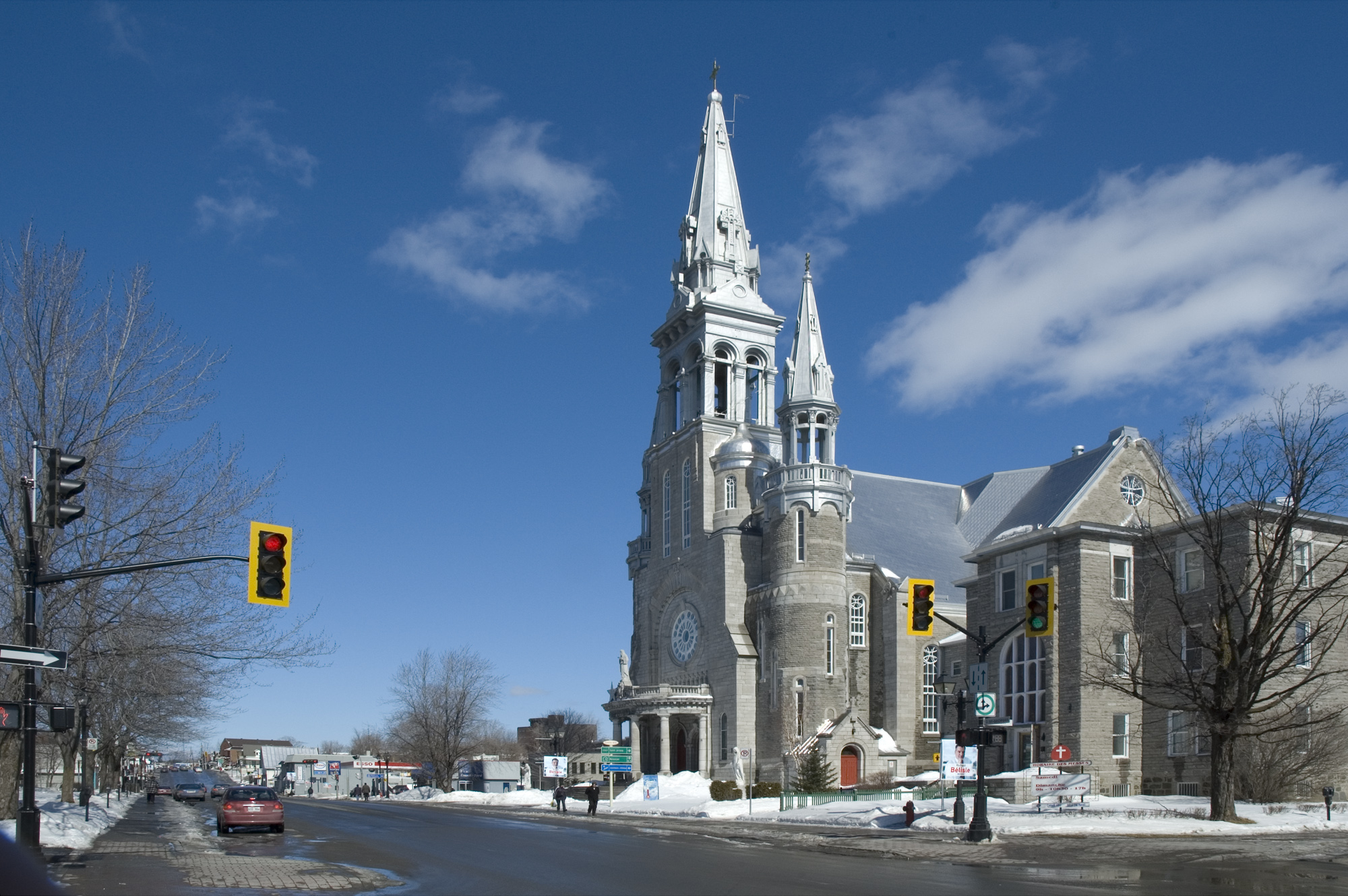
- St. Jerome's Cathedral
- Location: Saint-Jérôme; Quebec
- Country: Canada
- Denomination: Roman Catholic Church

The Cathedral of St. Jerome (French: Cathédrale de Saint-Jérôme) is the seat of the Roman Catholic Diocese of Saint-Jérôme-Mont-Laurier in Canada. The cathedral church is located at 355 Rue St-Georges in Saint-Jérôme, Quebec.

== History ==
The parish was erected in 1834. The current church was built from 1897 to 1900, replacing a smaller predecessor nearby.

The Diocese of Saint-Jérôme was erected on June 23, 1951, and Émilien Frenette, the first bishop, chose this church as the cathedral. It was listed as a historic monument by the town in 1999 and 2005.

== Architecture ==
An eclectic stone structure, it measures 24.6 m high, 76.9 m long and 30.7 m wide. The large narthex is situated below the Casavant organ. A large rose window is located near the rood screen, harmonizing with stained glass windows made in France by Delphis-Adolphe Beaulieu.

The cathedral also houses a museum honouring Antoine Labelle and the history of the diocese.

== See also ==
- Catholic Church in Canada
- St. Jerome
