= Paul Marchand =

Canadian Catholic bishop (1937-2011)

Paul Marchard
- Bishop of the Diocese of Timmins
- Church: Roman Catholic Church
- See: Diocese of Timmins
- In office: 1999 – July 24, 2011
- Predecessor: Gilles Cazabon
- Successor: Serge Poitras
- Previous post: Auxiliary Bishop

Orders
- Ordination: March 17, 1962

Personal details
- Born: April 17, 1937 Lafontaine, Ontario, Canada
- Died: July 24, 2011 (aged 74) Timmins, Ontario, Canada

Paul Marchard (April 17, 1937 – July 24, 2011) was the Roman Catholic bishop of the Roman Catholic Diocese of Timmins, Canada.

Marchand was born in Lafontaine, Ontario and grew up in the area near Georgian Bay.

He attended Montford Fathers at Papineauville, Quebec and joined the Company of Mary in 1956. He continued his studies (philosophy and theology) at Saint John's Scholasticate in Vanier, Ontario and then pastoral theology at Saint Paul University and University of Montreal.

He was ordained to the priesthood in 1962.

After his studies, Marchant was Director of the Centre for Christian Renewal from 1967 to 1973 (again from 1979 to 1982) and Director of the Maison d'Accueil and Director of the Sanctuary of Marie-Reine-des-Coeurs in Montreal from 1973 to 1987. He was appointed Provincial Superior of the Montfort Fathers of Canada in 1990.

He served as Auxiliary Bishop of the Archdiocese of Ottawa in 1993 and eventually became bishop of the Timmins Diocese in 1999 (succeeded Rev. Gilles Cazabon).
