= Sacred Heart Cathedral (Prince George, British Columbia) =

- Sacred Heart Cathedral, Prince George, Canada
- Sacred Heart Cathedral
- 53.9120°N 122.7404°W
- Location: 887 Patricia Boulevard; Prince George, BC; V2L 3V5
- Country: Canada
- Denomination: Roman Catholic
- Tradition: Latin Rite

Administration
- Archdiocese: Archdiocese of Vancouver
- Diocese: Roman Catholic Diocese of Prince George

Clergy
- Archbishop: His Excellency, The Most Reverend John Michael Miller, CSB
- Bishop: The Most Revd. Stephen Arthur Jensen
- Rector: Very Reverend Rectorino Tolentino Jr.

Sacred Heart Cathedral is a Roman Catholic Cathedral in the Canadian City of Prince George, British Columbia.

The Cathedral also serves as the Mother Church for the Roman Catholic Diocese of Prince George.

== Clergy ==
The current rector of the Sacred Heart Cathedral is Very Reverend Rectorino Tolentino Jr, who was the Vicar-General of the Diocese of Prince George

== Episcopal Ordinations at the Cathedral ==
On the 3rd of January, 2013, Pope Benedict XVI appointed Msgr. Stephen Jensen as the Bishop of Prince George.

To celebrate his episcopal ordination, the diocese held a Mass of Installation at 7pm Pacific Time inside the Sacred Heart Cathedral.

== Awards ==
In 2014, the Sacred Heart Cathedral was recognised for 90 years of history within the city by the Prince George Heritage Commission.

== See also ==
- Catholic Church
- Catholic Church in Canada
- Roman Catholic Archdiocese of Vancouver
