= CCCB =

'CCCB' may refer to:

- The Canadian Conference of Catholic Bishops is the episcopal conference of the Roman Catholic Church in Canada.
- The Centre de Cultura Contemporània de Barcelona is a museum adjacent to the Barcelona Museum of Contemporary Art (MACBA).
