= Hubert O'Connor =

Canadian Catholic bishop (1928–2007)

Most Reverend Hubert O'Connor O.M.I
- Bishop
- Province: Vancouver
- Diocese: Prince George
- See: Sacred Heart Cathedral
- Appointed: June 1986
- Term ended: July 1991
- Predecessor: John Fergus O'Grady, O.M.I.
- Successor: Gerald Wiesner, O.M.I.
- Other post: Bishop of Whitehorse (1971–1986)

Orders
- Ordination: 5 June 1955
- Consecration: December 8, 1971

Personal details
- Born: 17 February 1928 Huntingdon, Quebec
- Died: July 24, 2007 (aged 79)
- Buried: Oblates of Mary Immaculate Cemetery, Mission, British Columbia
- Denomination: Roman Catholic
- Children: 1 (given up for adoption)
- Profession: Priest and bishop

Hubert Patrick O'Connor, OMI (17 February 1928 – 24 July 2007) was a Canadian Catholic prelate who served as Bishop of Prince George from 1986 until his resignation following charges of sex crimes stemming from his time as principal of Saint Joseph's Mission Residential School in Williams Lake. At the time, he was the highest ranking Catholic official in the world to be charged with a sex crime. He was a member of the Oblates of Mary Immaculate.

O'Connor was tried twice for the alleged sex crimes. The first trial resulted in a stay of proceedings on constitutional grounds, but that decision was set aside on appeal and a new trial ordered by the Supreme Court of Canada. He was convicted at the second trial on some charges, but the convictions were set aside on appeal by the British Columbia Court of Appeal, which ordered a new trial. Before the new trial was held, O'Connor formally apologised to some of his victims in a First Nations healing circle in 1998. The victims said that they had received a sense of closure from the healing circle and the apology that they had not received from the criminal trial process. Based on the victims' comments, the Crown prosecution service entered a stay of proceedings to avoid revictimising them at another trial.

O'Connor died in 2007. After his death, a new allegation arose that O'Connor had sexually abused a young boy.

== Family and early life ==
O'Connor was born in Huntingdon, Quebec on 17 February 1928. His parents were Patrick O'Connor and Stella Walsh and he had several brothers and sisters.

== Church career ==
O'Connor was ordained to the priesthood on 5 June 1955 with the Oblates of Mary Immaculate after studying in Ottawa, Ontario. He worked within the church until being sent to Williams Lake as the principal of Saint Joseph's Mission from 1961 to 1967. St. Joseph's Mission was a key component of the Canadian Residential School System. It was during his time at St. Joseph's that O'Connor committed multiple sex crimes against underage Indigenous girls and boys and raped multiple Indigenous women.

On 15 October 1971, O'Connor was appointed Bishop of Whitehorse, Yukon. He then served as the Bishop of Prince George, British Columbia from 1986 to 1991 before resigning after being charged with multiple sex crimes.

== Sexual assault charges ==
In 1991, several students from the St. Joseph's Mission Residential School in Williams Lake came forward with allegations of sexual assault and sexual indecency while O'Connor was principal between 1964–1967. O'Connor went on trial in 1992, on four counts of sexual offences. Eight women testified that O'Connor repeatedly molested, raped, coerced, and physically and sexually abused young Indigenous girls at St. Joseph's Mission. Testimonies revealed that O'Connor also entered into sexual relationships with female staff at St. Joseph's who were in their teens and early 20s. O'Connor targeted the all-female bagpipe and dance band in particular because of their frequent field trips across British Columbia and Canada that left them isolated with O'Connor. One woman testified that during these trips, O'Connor would "crawl into girls' bunks and start kissing them". Incidents such as these led to O'Connor fathering at least one child, who was placed for adoption to avoid public scandal.

At trial, the defence raised a constitutional issue, alleging that the Crown prosecutors had failed to disclose evidence to the defence. After hearing submissions from Crown and defence, the trial judge agreed that the Crown had infringed O'Connor's constitutional right to full disclosure, and entered a stay of proceedings. The Crown appealed from that decision. In 1994, the British Columbia Court of Appeal unanimously allowed the Crown's appeal and ordered a retrial. O'Connor appealed to the Supreme Court of Canada, but in 1995 the Supreme Court upheld the decision of the British Columbia Court of Appeal and confirmed the order for a new trial, in R v O'Connor.

At the second trial, in 1996, O'Connor was acquitted on two of the charges, but convicted of rape and indecent assault of two young Indigenous women that occurred at St. Joseph's Residential School. Justice Wally Oppal sentenced O'Connor to two-and-a-half years in prison; he served six months of his sentence before being released on $1,000 bail pending an appeal in 1997.

In March 1998, the B.C. Court of Appeal acquitted O'Connor on the charge of indecent assault, and ordered a new trial on one count of rape. However, three months later, in June, O'Connor participated in a seven-hour healing circle held at Esk'etemc, a Secwepemc First Nations community near Williams Lake (formerly known as Alkali Lake Band). During the healing circle, O'Connor formally apologized to his victims. The victims later reported a sense of closure they had not found in the prior trials. The Crown, having considered the impact of O'Connor's apology and the extent to which the trials had retraumatized his victims, decided to drop the remaining rape charge.

== Death and subsequent allegation ==
O'Connor died suddenly of a heart attack in Toronto on 24 July 2007.

In July 2021, a new sexual assault allegation against the now-deceased O'Connor surfaced. Ronald Wayne Petruk filed a suit with the Supreme Court of B.C. stating that O'Connor sexually assaulted Petruk and other teen boys with fellow priests at St. Joseph's Mission. The suit was ongoing of 2022.
