= CCCB Publications =

CCCB Publications is the official publishing arm of the Canadian Conference of Catholic Bishops.

Its official goal is to assist the bishops in proclaiming the gospel of Jesus Christ and to share the teachings of the Church. It also serves as the official source of papal and curial documents in Canada.

It is sometimes compared to USCCB Publishing, which does related work for the United States Conference of Catholic Bishops.
