= Raymond Poisson (bishop) =

Canadian Roman Catholic prelate

- Bishop of Saint-Jérôme–Mont-Laurier
- Church: Catholic Church
- Diocese: Diocese of Saint-Jérôme–Mont-Laurier
- Installed: 21 May 2019
- Predecessor: Pierre Morissette (Bishop of Saint-Jérôme); Paul Lortie (Bishop of Mont-Laurier)
- Previous posts: Coadjutor Bishop of Saint-Jérôme (2018-2019); Bishop of Joliette (2015-2018); Titular Bishop of Gegi (2012-2015); Auxiliary Bishop of Saint-Jérôme (2012-2015)

Orders
- Ordination: 9 December 1983
- Consecration: 15 June 2012 by Pierre Morissette

Personal details
- Born: 30 April 1958 (age 67) Saint-Hyacinthe, Quebec, Canada
- Coat of arms

Raymond Poisson is a Canadian Roman Catholic prelate. He is bishop of Saint-Jérôme–Mont-Laurier. He served as the president of the Canadian Conference of Catholic Bishops from 2021–2023.
