= St. John Eudes Cathedral (Baie-Comeau) =

Coordinates: 49.1896°N 68.2628°W

- Cathédrale Saint-Jean-Eudes
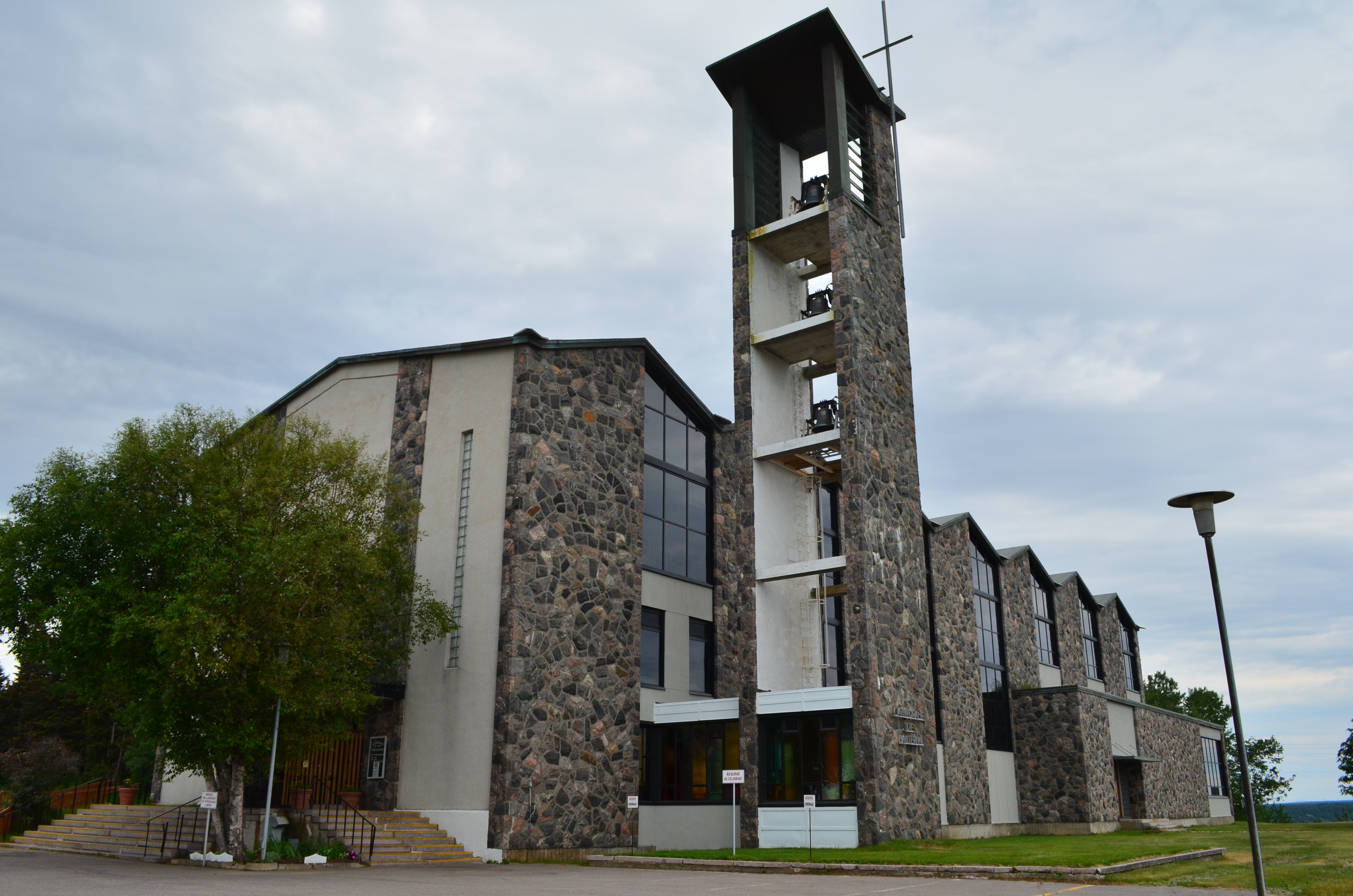
- St. John Eudes Cathedral
- Location: Baie-Comeau; Quebec
- Country: Canada
- Denomination: Roman Catholic Church

The St. John Eudes Cathedral (French: Cathédrale Saint-Jean-Eudes) It is a religious building located in Baie-Comeau, in the province of Quebec, eastern Canada. The cathedral is the seat of the diocese of Baie-Comeau and was built between 1958 and 1960 according to plans by the architects Claude Parent and Roger Moranville.

The facade of the building was built in stone and the side walls are mostly glass. The roof is asphalt shingles.

The plan of the cathedral is of rectangular shape formed by a ship and takes into account the presence of seats in the rear of the building and in the choir. The cathedral also has external rectangular chapels and high windows. The interior walls are plaster and vaulted ceiling, a low arch, it is wood.

== See also ==
- Roman Catholicism in Canada
- St. John Eudes

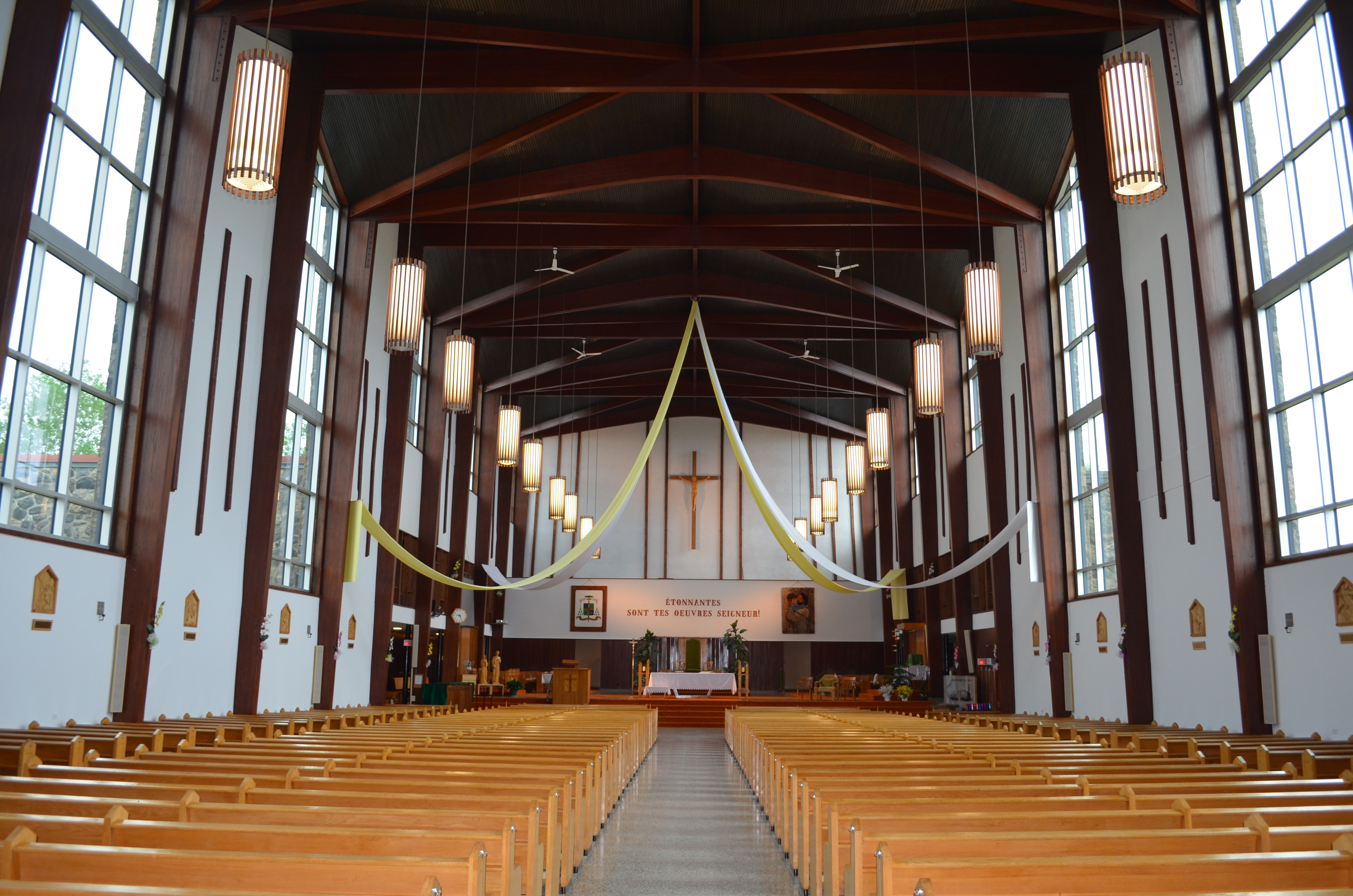
Internal view
