= Stephen Jensen =

The Most Reverend Stephen Arthur Jensen
- Bishop of Prince George
- Church: Roman Catholic Church
- Province: Vancouver
- See: Prince George
- Appointed: January 3, 2013
- Installed: April 2, 2013
- Predecessor: Gerald Wiesner
- Previous post: Vicar General of the Archdiocese of Vancouver (2009–2013)

Orders
- Ordination: May 24, 1980 by James Carney
- Consecration: April 2, 2013 by J. Michael Miller

Personal details
- Born: May 30, 1954 (age 72) North Vancouver, British Columbia, Canada
- Denomination: Roman Catholic
- Residence: Prince George
- Education: St. Peter's Seminary
- Motto: Parare Vias Eius (English: To prepare His ways)
- Coat of arms: Stephen Arthur Jensen's coat of arms

Styles of Stephen Arthur Jensen
- Reference style: The Most Reverend
- Spoken style: Your Excellency
- Religious style: Your Excellency

Ordination history of Stephen Jensen
History
Priestly ordination
- Ordained by: James Carney
Episcopal consecration
- Principal consecrator: J. Michael Miller
- Co-consecrators: David Monroe; Brian Joseph Dunn

Stephen Arthur Jensen (born May 30, 1954) is a Canadian prelate of the Roman Catholic Church. He was ordained a priest on May 24, 1980, by then-Archbishop James Francis Carney. On April 2, 2013, he was ordained Bishop of the Diocese of Prince George.

== Background ==
Jensen was born on May 30, 1954, in North Vancouver. His childhood Parish was Holy Trinity Parish in North Vancouver, which is also the home Parish of fellow-Bishop Mark Hagemoen. He studied at St. Peter's Seminary in London, Ontario, receiving a BA in Philosophy and a Master of Divinity in 1976 and 1979 respectively.

== See also ==
- Catholic Church in Canada

Catholic Church titles
Preceded by Mark Hagemoen	Vicar General of the Archdiocese of Vancouver; 2009–2013	Succeeded by Joseph Phuong Nguyen
Preceded by Gerald Wiesner	Bishop of Prince George; 2013–present	Incumbent
