= Jacques Landriault =

Canadian Prelate of Roman Catholic Church

- Bishop of the Diocese of Timmins (emeritus)
- Church: Roman Catholic Church
- See: Diocese of Timmins
- In office: 1971–1990
- Predecessor: Maxime Tessier
- Successor: Gilles Cazabon
- Previous post: Prelate

Orders
- Ordination: February 9, 1947

Personal details
- Born: September 23, 1921 Alfred, Ontario, Canada
- Died: November 6, 2017 (aged 96) Ottawa, Ontario, Canada

Jacques Landriault (French pronunciation: [ʒak lɑ̃dʁjo]; September 23, 1921 – November 6, 2017) was a Canadian Prelate of Roman Catholic Church.

Landriault was born in Alfred, Ontario and was ordained a priest on February 9, 1947. Landriault was appointed bishop to the Diocese of Alexandria as well as titular bishop of Cadi on May 15, 1962, and consecrated on July 25, 1962. Landriault was appointed bishop of the Diocese of Hearst on May 27, 1964, installed July 14, 1964, and resigned from the post February 8, 1973. Landriault was appointed bishop of Diocese of Timmins on March 24, 1971, and resigned from the diocese on December 13, 1990. He died on November 6, 2017, at age 96.
