= Joseph-Alfred Archambeault =

Canadian bishop (1859-1913)

- Bishop of Joliette
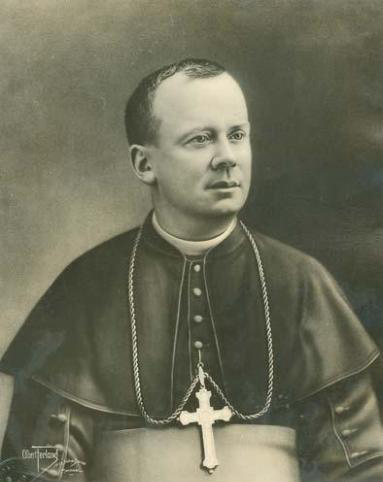
- circa 1900
- Diocese: Joliette
- Installed: 1904
- Term ended: 1913
- Successor: Joseph-Guillaume-Laurent Forbes

Personal details
- Born: Joseph-Hector-Alfred Archambeault; May 23, 1859 L’Assomption, Province of Canada
- Died: April 25, 1913 (aged 53) Saint-Thomas, Quebec, Canada

Joseph-Alfred Archambeault (May 23, 1859 – April 25, 1913) was a Roman Catholic priest and bishop in Canada. He was the first bishop of Joliette, Quebec.

He was born in L'Assomption, Canada Lower Canada and educated at the Grand Séminaire de Montréal. He was ordained in 1882 and obtained doctorates in theology and canon law in Rome. He taught in Montreal and worked as a chancellor. He was ordained as a bishop in 1904 and assigned the newly created diocese in Joliette. He created new educational institutions in Joliette and campaigned for temperance. He published a letter against a book that criticised the Catholic Church's opposition to the theory of evolution, and threatened to excommunicate its author.

== Early life, family, and education ==
Archambeault was born in L'Assomption, Canada, on May 23, 1859. His father was Louis Archambeault, a politician, and his mother was Marguerite-Élisabeth Dugal. His brother was Horace Archambeault. Joseph was baptised Joseph-Hector-Alfred Archambeault.

Archambeault completed classical studies at Collège de l'Assomption from 1870 to 1877 and did his seminary studies at the Grand Séminaire de Montréal. He was ordained as a priest in 1882 and went to Rome to obtain doctorates in theology and canon law.

== Early religious career ==
Archambeault returned to Canada and taught philosophy at Collège de L’Assomption from 1885 to 1888. He moved to Montreal in 1888 to be the vice-chancellor to archbishop Édouard-Charles Fabre, and was promoted as chancellor in 1892. He was also ecclesiastical superior of the Sisters of Charity of Providence from 1891-1904. He started teaching natural law at Université Laval in 1888 and was the university's rector from 1902-1904.

Archambeault became a canon in 1891. In 1896, he was chosen by Fabre to represent his interests in Rome, and a protonotary apostolic in 1902.

== Role of bishop ==
In 1904, Archambeault was ordained as bishop for the newly created diocese of Joliette. He restored the cathedral in Joliette and added decorations. He required candidates for the priesthood to study for three years at the Grand Séminaire and created Collège Joliette. He also created elementary schools in the region and a board of examiners for teachers. He supported temperance, releasing a pastoral letter in 1906 in support of this, and campaigned against events and shows in Joliette that he considered immoral. In 1911 a doctor named Albert Laurendeau published a book criticising the Catholic Church's opposition to the theory of evolution. Archambeault published a circular against the book in 1912, required all parishes to read it out loud, and threatened to excommunicate Laurendeau unless he recanted the book. In Quebec at the time, this would have meant social death. Laurendeau acquiesced to recant in a letter, which Archambeault published against Laurendeau's wishes.

He was the secretary at the first meeting of Canadian prelates and published a pastoral letter about the Eucharist at the 1910 International Eucharistic Congress in Montreal.

== Later life and death ==
Archambeault's health deteriorated after the congress in Montréal. He also postponed a trip to Rome. He attended the Eucharistic Congress in Vienna and visited friends in Rome and Paris in 1912. Archambeault died on April 25, 1913, in Saint-Thomas, Quebec.
