= Roch Martin =

Canadian Roman Catholic bishop (born 1964)

The Most Reverend Roch Martin
- Bishop of Timmins
- Church: Catholic Church
- Diocese: Timmins
- Appointed: 1 May 2026
- Installed: 24 August 2026
- Predecessor: Serge Poitras
- Previous post: Vicar General of Diocese of Sault Ste. Marie (2021–2026)

Orders
- Ordination: 10 November 1995 by Jean-Louis Plouffe
- Consecration: 24 August 2026 by Marcel Damphousse

Personal details
- Born: 26 September 1964 (age 62) Sturgeon Falls, Ontario, Canada
- Education: Laurentian University; Saint Paul University
- Coat of arms

Roch Martin (born 26 September 1964) is a Canadian Roman Catholic prelate who has served as Bishop of Timmins since 2026. He was previously vicar general and moderator of the curia of the Diocese of Sault Sainte Marie in Ontario.

== Early life and education ==
Martin was born on 26 September 1964, in Sturgeon Falls, Ontario. He attended École secondaire Franco-Cité in Sturgeon Falls from 1978 to 1983. He subsequently studied at Laurentian University and the University of Sudbury, earning a Bachelor of Arts from 1983 to 1986. He continued his studies at Saint Paul University in Ottawa, completing a Bachelor of Theology from 1986 to 1988. Before completing his seminary formation, he worked as a teacher in southwestern Ontario from 1989 to 1993. He later obtained a Master of Arts in Pastoral Studies from Saint Paul University and the University of Ottawa from 1993 to 1995.

== Priesthood ==
Martin was ordained to the diaconate on 6 August 1995, at St. Joseph Parish in Chelmsford by Bishop Jean-Louis Plouffe of Sault Ste. Marie. He was ordained a priest for the Diocese of Sault Ste. Marie on 10 November 1995, at Sacré-Cœur Parish in Sturgeon Falls, again by Plouffe.

Martin's early pastoral assignment was as associate pastor of St. Joseph Parish in Chelmsford from 1995 to 1997. He subsequently served as pastor of Notre-Dame-de-la-Merci in Coniston, St. Marc in Markstay, and Notre-Dame-de-la-Rivière in Wahnapitae from 1997 to 2000. He was then pastor in solidum of St-Dominique, St-Augustin, and L'Annonciation in Sudbury until 2001. From 2001 to 2012 he was pastor of St. Jacques Parish in Hanmer, followed by Sainte-Anne-des-Pins Parish in Sudbury from 2012 to 2014 and St. Joseph Parish in Chelmsford from 2014 to 2019. He served at St-Jean-de-Brébeuf Parish in Sudbury from 2019 to 2021.

In 2021, Bishop Thomas Dowd appointed Martin vicar general of the Diocese of Sault Ste. Marie, effective 1 August. The vicar general assists the diocesan bishop in the governance of the diocese and can exercise authority on the bishop's behalf. He subsequently served as vicar general and Moderator Curiae of the diocese.

== Bishop of Timmins ==
On 1 May 2026, Pope Leo XIV accepted the resignation of Bishop Serge Poitras as Bishop of Timmins and appointed Martin as his successor. At the time of his appointment, Martin was serving as vicar general of the Diocese of Sault Ste. Marie.

Martin's episcopal consecration took place on 24 August 2026. Archbishop Marcel Damphousse was the principal consecrator, with Bishop Thomas Dowd of Sault Ste. Marie and Bishop emeritus Serge Poitras of Timmins serving as principal co-consecrators. He thereby became the Bishop of Timmins, succeeding Poitras.

At the time of his appointment, Martin said that he had not expected to be selected as a bishop and accepted the appointment "with the grace of God". He also said that he hoped to draw on the example of Dowd, whom he had assisted as vicar general.
