= Donald Lapointe =

Canadian clergyman of the Roman Catholic Church

Donald Lapointe (born 25 September 1936 in Disraeli, Quebec) is a Canadian clergyman of the Roman Catholic Church and emeritus auxiliary bishop in Saint-Jérôme.

== Life ==
On 23 May 1964 Donald Lapointe received the priestly ordination for the bishopric of Sherbrooke.

Pope John Paul II appointed him on 26 October 2002 as titular bishop of Octabia, and auxiliary bishop in Saint-Jérôme. The Bishop of Saint-Jérôme, Gilles Cazabon, gave him the bishop's ordination on December 13, The co-conquerors were André Gaumond, Archbishop of Sherbrooke, and Vital Massé, Bishop of Mont-Laurier.

On 30 July 2011, Pope Benedict XVI took his age-related resignation.
