= Canadian Conference of Catholic Bishops =

Assembly of Catholic bishops of Canada

- Abbreviation: CCCB
- Formation: 1943
- Legal status: Civil nonprofit
- Purpose: To support the ministry of bishops
- Headquarters: Ottawa
- Region served: Canada
- Members: Active and retired Catholic bishops of Canada
- President: Raymond Poisson
- Vice President: William McGrattan
- Main organ: Conference
- Parent organization: Holy See
- Staff: 40
- Website: www.cccb.ca

The Canadian Conference of Catholic Bishops (CCCB; French: Conférence des évêques catholiques du Canada) is the national assembly of the bishops of the Catholic Church in Canada. It was founded in 1943, and was officially recognized by the Holy See in 1948. Since the Second Vatican Council, it became part of a worldwide network of episcopal conferences, established in 1965. Until 1977, it was called the Canadian Catholic Conference, when the present name was adopted.

According to its statutes, together the bishops exercise certain pastoral functions for Catholics in Canada, respecting the autonomy of each bishop in the service of his particular church.

Through the work of its members, the conference is involved in matters of national and international scope in areas such as ecumenism and interfaith dialogue, social justice, aid to developing countries, the protection of human life, liturgy and Christian education. It also provides the bishops with a forum where they can share their experience and insight on the life of the church and the major events that shape society.

The members of the conference include all diocesan bishops in Canada and those equivalent to them in law, all coadjutor bishops, and auxiliary bishops. Also included in the conference are titular bishops of any rite within the Catholic Church who exercise in the territory a special office assigned to them by the Apostolic See or by the conference.

== General secretariat ==
To assist them in their pastoral work, the bishops have established a permanent bilingual secretariat in Ottawa, which includes various offices and services.

In the Ottawa offices of the CCCB, a staff of about 20 people, laypersons, priests and religious, are at the service of the bishops.

The secretariat assists in coordinating activities and information, and in maintaining contacts with the Holy See and other Episcopal conferences, as well as with churches, ecclesial communities, faith groups and government authorities at the national and international levels. It also works in collaboration with the four regional Episcopal assemblies in Canada.

== Episcopal commissions and Aboriginal Council ==
Episcopal commissions and one council are at the service of the Canadian Conference of Catholic Bishops.

Each commission specializes in one pastoral area, to guide and support the bishops in their ministry. Driven by the work and expertise of four bishops and one secretary (consultants and observers can also join the groups), each commission studies current events, analyses the needs for the Church in Canada, and organizes projects aimed at supporting Christian communities.

Six of the commissions are national – formed by bishops equally distributed between the French and English sectors – while the five others are named "sectoral" because they are divided depending on the language of the member bishops. Three of those commissions are from the English sector, while two originate from the French sector.

The Catholic Aboriginal Council encourages Aboriginal leadership in the Christian community. CCCB Publications is the official publishing arm of the Canadian bishops.

== Indigenous Reconciliation Fund ==
In February 2022, the Canadian Bishops announced the establishment of an Indigenous Reconciliation Fund, which will accept contributions from the 73 dioceses across the country.

The announcement follows the organization's $30 million financial pledge to support healing and reconciliation initiatives for residential school survivors, their families, and communities.

Rosella Kinoshameg, an elder of Ontario’s Wikwemikong Unceded First Nation, will be one of three Indigenous directors of the Indigenous Reconciliation Fund. She said in February 2022 that the fund represented a chance to forge new relationships between the Catholic Church and Indigenous Canadians.

== List of presidents ==
- 2021–2025: William McGrattan, Bishop of Calgary
- 2021–2023: Raymond Poisson, Bishop of Saint-Jerome and Mont Laurier
- 2019–2021: Richard Gagnon, Archbishop of Winnipeg
- 2017–2019: Lionel Gendron, Bishop of Saint-Jean-Longueuil
- 2015–2017: David Crosby, Bishop of Hamilton
- 2013–2015: Paul-André Durocher, Metropolitan Archbishop of Gatineau
- 2011–2013: Richard Smith, Metropolitan Archbishop of Edmonton
- 2009–2011: Pierre Morissette, Bishop of Saint-Jérôme
- 2007–2009: James Weisgerber, Archbishop of Winnipeg
- 2005–2007: André Gaumond, Metropolitan Archbishop of Sherbrooke
- 2003–2005: Brendan O'Brien, Metropolitan Archbishop of St. John's
- 2001–2003: Jacques Berthelet, Bishop of Saint-Jean-Longueuil
- 1999–2001: Gerald Wiesner, Bishop of Prince George
- 1997–1999: Jean-Claude Turcotte, Metropolitan Archbishop of Montreal
- 1995–1997: Francis Spence, Metropolitan Archbishop of Kingston
- 1993–1995: Jean-Guy Hamelin, Bishop of Rouyn-Noranda
- 1991–1993: Marcel Gervais, Metropolitan Archbishop of Ottawa
- 1989–1991: Robert Lebel, Bishop of Valleyfield
- 1987–1989: James Hayes, Metropolitan Archbishop of Halifax
- 1985–1987: Bernard Hubert, Bishop of Saint-Jean-Longueuil
- 1983–1985: John Sherlock, Bishop of London
- 1981–1983: Henri Légaré, Metropolitan Archbishop of Grouard-McLennan
- 1979–1981: Joseph McNeil, Metropolitan Archbishop of Edmonton
- 1977–1979: Joseph Ouellet, Metropolitan Archbishop of Rimouski
- 1975–1977: Gerald Carter, Metropolitan Archbishop of Toronto
- 1973–1975: Jean-Marie Fortier, Metropolitan Archbishop of Sherbrooke
- 1971–1973: William Power, Bishop of Antigonish
- 1970–1971: Joseph-Aurèle Plourde, Metropolitan Archbishop of Ottawa
- 1967–1970: Alexander Carter, Bishop of Sault-Sainte-Marie
- 1964–1967: George Cardinal Flahiff, Archbishop of Winnipeg
- 1960–1964: Joseph Berry, Metropolitan Archbishop of Halifax
- 1959–1960: Paul Bernier, Bishop of Gaspè
- 1958–1959: James Cardinal McGuigan, Cardinal-Priest of S. Maria del Popolo, Metropolitan Archbishop of Toronto

== See also ==
- List of Roman Catholic dioceses in Canada
- Roman Catholic Church in Canada
