= Canadian Catholic Aboriginal Council =

The Canadian Catholic Aboriginal Council (CCAC), established in 1998 by the Canadian Conference of Catholic Bishops, encourages Aboriginal (Indigenous) leadership in the Christian community, supports healing and reconciliation, and advises the bishops on Aboriginal questions. Eight Aboriginal Catholics from all parts of Canada are members, as well as Albert LeGatt, Bishop of Saskatoon, and Claude Champagne, Bishop of Edmundston.

== History ==
The Canadian Conference of Catholic Bishops was recognized by the Holy See in 1948. Some five decades later, in 1998, the CCCB created the council to promote traditional Aboriginal culture while uniting it to Roman Catholicism. The Council establishes relations between Aboriginal and non-Aboriginal Catholics, thereby promoting Aboriginal leaders. In 2007 and 2008, the council has built study programs to identify Aboriginal spirituality and to educate non-Aboriginal Canadians about Aboriginal culture. These educational programs include the study of the Pilgrimage of the Basilica of St. Anne de Beaupré.
