= Catholic News Service =

American news agency

- Current logo
- Abbreviation: CNS
- Founded: 1920; 106 years ago
- Type: News agency
- Website: www.usccb.org/newsroom

Catholic News Service (CNS) is an American news agency owned by the United States Conference of Catholic Bishops (USCCB) that reports on the Catholic Church.

The agency's domestic (United States) service shut down on 30 December 2022, but CNS continues to function and provide reports concerning world events and Catholic news. The news agency's domestic distribution platform and archives were acquired by Our Sunday Visitor and used to launch OSV News.

== History ==
CNS was established in 1920 as the National Catholic Welfare Council (NCWC) Press Department. In the 1960s it became the National Catholic News Service; it later dropped "National" from its name in 1986 to indicate its intention to provide worldwide coverage. It is now owned by the USCCB, the NCWC's successor.

From 2004 to 2016, Tony Spence led CNS as its director and editor-in-chief. He was removed in April 2016 after a number of Catholics criticized his posts on Twitter that favored LGBT rights.

In February 2021, Pope Francis in a meeting with CNS journalists to celebrate the 100th anniversary of CNS, praised CNS as "an invaluable contribution to the English-speaking world".

On 4 May 2022, Catholic News Service announced that it would cease its operations in the United States on 31 December 2022 due to a decision of the USCCB; CNS added that its Rome bureau would continues to operate and "continue to report on Vatican and related international events". The news agency's domestic distribution platform and archives were acquired by Our Sunday Visitor and used to launch the new OSV News.

== Organization ==
In 2015, CNS described itself as the primary source of national and global news that the US Catholic press reports. It then operated as an editorially independent and a financially self-sustaining division of the US Conference of Catholic Bishops. At that time it was based in Washington, DC, United States.

The documentary service of CNS, Origins, "publishes texts from the Vatican, [P]ope, bishops, Congress, Senate, Supreme Court and church leaders around the world".

== See also ==
- America (magazine)
- Catholic News Agency
- Catholic World News
- Crux (online newspaper)
- National Catholic Reporter
- Our Sunday Visitor
- USCCB Publishing
