= René Audet =

- Bishop of Diocese of Joliette
- Church: Roman Catholic Church
- See: Diocese of Joliette
- In office: 1968 - 1990
- Predecessor: Joseph Arthur Papineau
- Successor: Gilles Lussier
- Previous post(s): Auxiliary Bishop

Orders
- Ordination: May 30, 1948

Personal details
- Born: January 18, 1920; Montreal, Quebec, Canada
- Died: June 12, 2011 (aged 91)

René Audet (January 18, 1920 – June 12, 2011) was a Canadian bishop of the Roman Catholic Church.

Audet was born in Montreal, Quebec and ordained a priest May 30, 1948. He was appointed Auxiliary archbishop of the Archdiocese of Ottawa as well as Titular bishop of Chonochora on May 21, 1963, and ordained on July 31, 1963. On January 3, 1968, he was appointed bishop of the Diocese of Joliette. He resigned from that position on October 31, 1990.
