= Pierre Charland =

Canadian Catholic bishop

Monsignor Pierre Charland OFM
- Bishop of Baie-Comeau
- Church: Catholic Church
- Diocese: Baie-Comeau
- Appointed: 18 February 2025
- Predecessor: Jean-Pierre Blais

Orders
- Ordination: 22 June 2012 by Christian Lépine
- Consecration: 28 May 2025 by Denis Grondin

Personal details
- Born: 20 December 1962 (age 63) North Bay, Ontario, Canada
- Coat of arms

Pierre Charland (born 20 December 1962) is a Canadian Roman Catholic prelate who has been the bishop of the Roman Catholic Diocese of Baie-Comeau since 2025.
