= Gerald Wiesner =

Canadian Catholic bishop and theologian

Gerald Wiesner OMI
- Bishop Emeritus of Prince George
- Church: Catholic Church
- Diocese: Diocese of Prince George
- In office: 6 October 1992 – 3 January 2013
- Predecessor: Hubert O'Connor
- Successor: Stephen Jensen

Orders
- Ordination: 23 February 1963
- Consecration: 22 February 1993 by Adam Exner

Personal details
- Born: Gerald William Wiesner; June 25, 1937 (age 88) Denzil, Saskatchewan, Canada

Gerald William Wiesner OMI (born June 25, 1937) is a Canadian prelate of the Roman Catholic Church. He was ordained bishop of the Diocese of Prince George on February 22, 1993 and retired on January 3, 2013. Stephen Arthur Jensen succeeded him as the new bishop of Prince George.

== Ordination ==
Wiesner was ordained a priest in 1963. He taught at Newman Theological College in Edmonton and was named Provincial Superior of the Oblates of St. Mary's Province in Saskatoon in 1984. He was ordained Bishop of Prince George on Feb 22, 1993 and served as President of the Canadian Conference of Catholic Bishops from 1999 to 2001 and a member of its Permanent Council from 1995 to 2001.

== Diocese of Prince George ==
Wiesner served as the bishop of Prince George for 20 years. He initiated opportunities for adult faith development, oversaw the reorganization of the diocese and resolved its debt. On Jan 3, 2013, he retired from his post.

== Post-episcopal life ==
Although he is now retired, Wiesner remains active in teaching and traveling.
