= Gustave Maria Blanche =

French-Canadian Roman Catholic priest

- Vicar Apostolic of Golfe St-Laurent
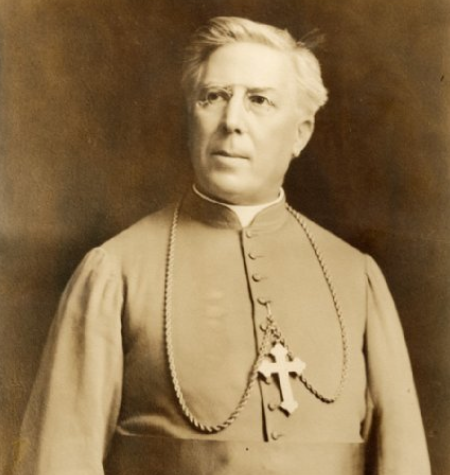
- Diocese: Golfe St-Laurent
- Other posts: Titular Bishop of Sicca Veneria; Founder of Université Sainte-Anne, in Nova Scotia, Canada

Personal details
- Born: 30 April 1849 Josselin, Diocese de Vannes, France
- Died: 26 July 1916 (aged 67) Paris, France

Gustave Maria Blanche (30 April 1849 – 26 July 1916) was a French-Canadian Roman Catholic priest, Bishop, and Vicar Apostolic of Golfe St-Laurent (now Baie-Comeau).

Born in Josselin, Diocese de Vannes, France, the son of L. Blanche and Marie Hayard, Blanche was called to the Bar in France. In 1870, he was a volunteer in the Franco-Prussian War. In 1873, he joined the Eudists. He was ordained a priest in 1878. From 1878 to 1890, he was the director of the Ecole St. Jean in Versailles. In 1890 he founded and until 1899 he was director of Collège Sainte-Anne, which later became Université Sainte-Anne, in Church Point, Nova Scotia. In 1905, he was appointed Titular Bishop of Sicca Veneria and Vicar Apostolic of Golfe St-Laurent.
