= Charles-Omer Valois =

Canadian prelate of the Catholic Church

- Bishop of Diocese of Saint-Jérôme Emeritus
- Church: Roman Catholic Church
- See: Roman Catholic Diocese of Saint-Jérôme
- In office: 1977 - 1997
- Predecessor: Bernard Hubert
- Successor: Gilles Cazabon, O.M.I

Orders
- Ordination: June 3, 1950

Personal details
- Born: April 24, 1924; Montreal, Quebec
- Died: August 4, 2013 (aged 89)

Charles-Omer Valois (April 24, 1924 – August 4, 2013) was a Canadian prelate of the Catholic Church.

Charles-Omer Valois was born in Montreal and was ordained a priest on June 3, 1950. Valois was appointed bishop of the Diocese of Saint-Jérôme on June 10, 1977, and ordained bishop on June 29, 1977. Valois would resign from the diocese on January 22, 1997.

== See also ==
- Diocese of Saint-Jérôme
