= Diocese of Timmins =

Catholic ecclesiastical territory

Diocese of Timmins Dioecesis Timminsensis

Location
- Country: Canada
- Ecclesiastical province: Ottawa–Cornwall

Statistics
- Population: Total; Catholics: (as of 2022); 101,393; 61,206 (60.4%)

Information
- Denomination: Roman Catholic
- Rite: Roman Rite
- Established: 10 December 1938
- Cathedral: St. Anthony of Padua Cathedral

Current leadership
- Pope: Leo XIV
- Bishop: Roch Martin
- Metropolitan Archbishop: Marcel Damphousse
- Bishops emeritus: Serge Poitras

Website
- dioctims.ca

The Roman Catholic Diocese of Timmins (Latin: Dioecesis Timminsensis) in Northeastern Ontario is a suffragan of the Archdiocese of Ottawa–Cornwall. Erected on 21 September 1908, the Vicariate Apostolic of Temiskaming was later elevated as the Diocese of Haileybury on 31 December 1915 and then renamed as the Diocese of Timmins on 10 December 1938.

== History ==
The Vicariate Apostolic of Temiskaming was set up bounded on the north by Hudson Bay and the Great Whale River; on the south by the height of land, or watershed, except in the Temiskaming district, where the southern boundary is 47° N. lat.; on the east by 72° W. long and on the west by 91° W long. It was erected on 22 Sept., 1908, by dividing the Diocese of Pembroke.

Father de Bellefeuille, S.S., and Father Dupuy of Montreal, first preached the Gospel here in 1836. Annual visits were made, missions being held at the Hudson's Bay Company's trading posts. The Oblates of Mary Immaculate were given charge in 1843. Father Laverlochere was the first of these missionaries. They established a residence at Fort Temiskaming in 1863, but removed to Ville Marie in 1886.

Haileybury, Ontario was the residence of the first vicar Apostolic, Elie-Anicet Latulipe. He was born at St. Anicet, Province of Quebec, 3 August 1859. Ordained on 30 May 1885, he was successively curate at St. Henri, Montreal, chaplain at the convents of the Good Shepherd, Montreal, and St. Anne's, Lachine, rector of Pembroke Cathedral, and pastor of Haileybury. He was named Titular Bishop of Catenna and first Vicar-Apostolic of Temiskaming on 1 October 1908, and consecrated on 30 November 1908.

== Bishops ==
=== Ordinaries ===
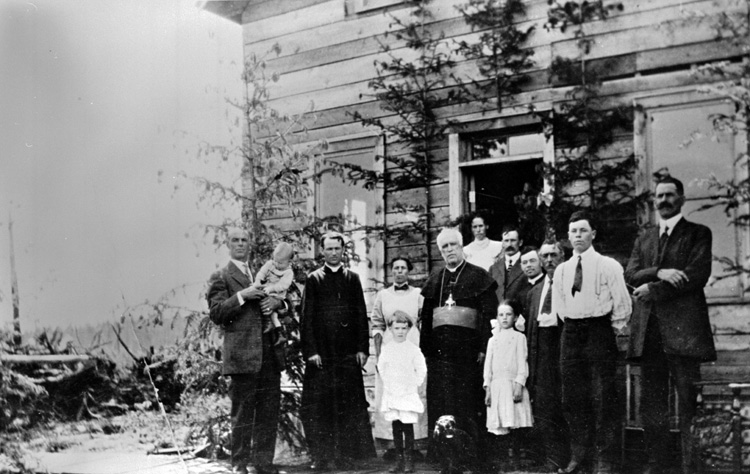
Bishop Élie Anicet Latulipe in 1915

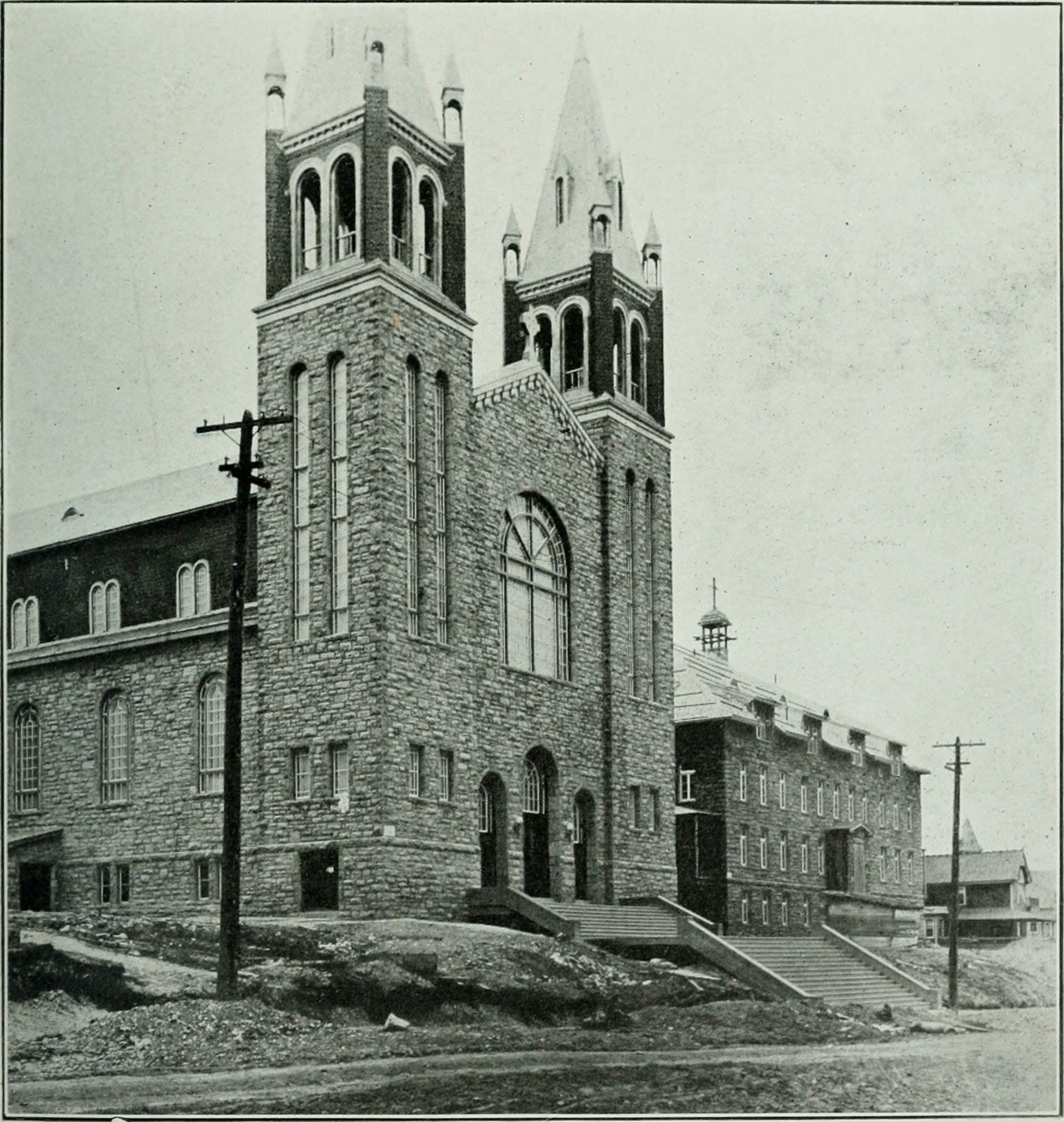
Holy Cross Cathedral, Haileybury in the early 20th century

- Élie Anicet Latulipe (1908–1922)
- Louis Rhéaume, O.M.I. (1923–1955)
- Maxime Tessier (1955–1971)
- Jacques Landriault (1971–1990)
- Gilles Cazabon, O.M.I. (1992–1997), appointed Bishop of Saint-Jérôme, Québec
- Paul Marchand, S.M.M. (1999–2011)
- Serge Poitras (2012–2026) (°1949.05.27)
- Roch Martin (2026–present)

=== Coadjutor bishop ===
- Maxime Tessier (1953–1955)

=== Other priest of this diocese who became bishop ===
- Paul-André Durocher, archbishop of Gatineau

== Territorial losses ==
Year	Along with	To form
1919		Prefecture Apostolic of Northern Ontario
1938		Diocese of Amos
1938	Vicariate Apostolic of Northern Ontario	Vicariate Apostolic of Baie James
1973		Diocese of Rouyn-Noranda

== Bibliography ==
- "Diocese of Timmins". Catholic-Hierarchy.
