= Pierre Morissette =

Canadian Roman Catholic bishop

- Bishop of Saint-Jérôme
- Church: Catholic Church
- Diocese: Diocese of Saint-Jérôme
- In office: 3 July 2008 – 21 May 2019
- Predecessor: Gilles Cazabon
- Successor: Raymond Poisson
- Previous posts: Bishop of Baie-Comeau (1990-2008); Titular Bishop of Mesarfelta (1987-1990); Auxiliary Bishop of Québec (1987-1990)

Orders
- Ordination: 8 June 1968 by Maurice Roy
- Consecration: 12 June 1987 by Louis-Albert Vachon

Personal details
- Born: Joseph Paul Pierre Morissette; 22 November 1944 (age 81) Thetford Mines, Quebec, Canada
- Coat of arms

Joseph Paul Pierre Morissette (born November 22, 1944) is the Roman Catholic bishop of the Roman Catholic Diocese of Saint-Jérôme, Quebec, Canada. He was formerly bishop of the Roman Catholic Diocese of Baie-Comeau.

Morissette was born in Thetford Mines. He was ordained to the priesthood on June 8, 1968. On February 27, 1987, he was appointed auxiliary bishop in the Roman Catholic Archdiocese of Quebec and titular bishop of Mesarfelta. On March 17, 1990, he was appointed bishop of Baie-Comeau, and on July 3, 2008 he was appointed bishop of Saint-Jérôme.
