= Gilles Cazabon =

Canadian Catholic bishop (born 1933)

Gilles Cazabon OMI
- Bishop Emeritus of Saint-Jérôme
- Church: Catholic Church
- Archdiocese: Archdiocese of Montreal
- Diocese: Diocese of Saint-Jérôme
- Appointed: 27 December 1997
- Term ended: 3 July 2008
- Predecessor: Charles Valois
- Successor: Pierre Morissette
- Other post: Bishop of Timmins (1992–1997)

Orders
- Ordination: 11 June 1960 by Alexander Carter
- Consecration: 29 June 1992 by Marcel Gervais

Personal details
- Born: 5 April 1933 (age 93) Verner, Ontario, Canada
- Education: University of Ottawa, UCLouvain
- Motto: In Deum Vivum Speramus

Gilles Cazabon OMI (born 5 April 1933) is a Canadian Catholic prelate who served as Bishop of Timmins from 1992 to 1997 and Bishop of Saint-Jérôme from 1997 until his retirement in 2008.

== Early life and ministry ==
Cazabon was born on 5 April 1933 in Verner, Ontario as the 14th child in the family. He entered the Missionary Oblates of Mary Immaculate and was ordained to the priesthood on 11 June 1960. He has a bachelor's degree in philosophy and theology from the University of Ottawa and a PhD in Philosophy from the UCLouvain, Belgium.

From 1967 to 1973, he was professor and dean of the Faculty of Philosophy at the University of Ottawa, a member of the University Senate and Saint Paul University and President of the Canadian Association of Philosophy. During the same period, he was also involved in the formation of members of his religious family.

From 1973 to 1979, he was superior of the Province of Saint-Joseph of Montreal of the Oblates of Marie Immaculate. In 1980 he became commissioner of the General Chapter of the Oblates. Subsequently he became Rector of Saint Paul Seminary in Ottawa, and in 1986 Vicar General of the Oblates of Mary Immaculate in Rome.

== Episcopal ministry ==
On 13 March 1992, Pope John Paul II appointed Cazabon Bishop of Timmins. He received episcopal consecration on 29 June 1992 from Archbishop Marcel Gervais, with Bishops Jacques Landriault and Henri Goudreault serving as co-consecrators.

On 27 December 1997, Pope John Paul II transferred him to the Diocese of Saint-Jérôme. The Canadian Conference of Catholic Bishops announced his appointment on the same day.

In November 2007, Cazabon was named vice-president of the Canadian Council of Churches.

Pope Benedict XVI accepted Cazabon's resignation as Bishop of Saint-Jérôme on 3 July 2008, upon his reaching the canonical retirement age. He was succeeded by Pierre Morissette.
