= Diocese of Prince George =

Catholic ecclesiastical territory

Diocese of Prince George Dioecesis Principis Georgensis

Location
- Country: Canada
- Territory: Northern British Columbia
- Ecclesiastical province: Archdiocese of Vancouver

Statistics
- Area: 345,600 km^{2} (133,400 sq mi)
- Population: 51,200 (as of 2004) (21.8%)

Information
- Denomination: Roman Catholic
- Rite: Roman Rite
- Established: July 13, 1967
- Cathedral: Sacred Heart Cathedral

Current leadership
- Pope: Leo XIV
- Bishop: Stephen Jensen
- Bishops emeritus: Gerald William Wiesner, O.M.I.

Website
- pgdiocese.bc.ca

The Roman Catholic Diocese of Prince George (Latin: Dioecesis Principis Georgensis) was created as the Vicariate Apostolic of Prince Rupert on January 14, 1944, when the Vicariate Apostolic of Yukon-Prince Rupert was split. It is a suffragan of the Archdiocese of Vancouver. It was elevated on July 13, 1967. As of October 2022, the bishop is Stephen Jensen.

== Diocesan Demographics ==
The diocese consists of 1 emeritus bishop, 1 bishop, 5 religious and 16 diocesan priests, 4 brothers, 17 sisters, all serving 51,200 Catholics in 18 parishes, 20 missions and 8 schools.

== History ==
The first priest to baptise in the area of Fort George was Father Demers in 1842. In 1885, Father Adrien-Gabriel Morice, OMI, served the Carrier and Sekani First Nations from Stuart Lake. He created the first writing system for the Carrier language, the Carrier syllabics, and translated the Carrier prayer book, which is still used today. Father Morice was also credited with the first map of the interior of British Columbia, published by the government in 1907.

On January 14, 1944, the Vicariate Apostolic of Yukon-Prince Rupert split into the Vicariate Apostolic of Prince Rupert and the Vicariate Apostolic of Whitehorse. The Peace Region of BC, which was part of the old Archdiocese of Grouard-MacLennan, became part of the newly formed Vicariate of Prince Rupert. Emile-Marie Bunoz became the first bishop of the newly formed territory.

in 1956, Bishop John Fergus O'Grady, OMI, became the third bishop of the vicariate. Under his leadership, the number of schools was greatly increased to thirteen. The Frontier Apostolate was created by Bishop O'Grady to help staff the schools and administrations. 1960, Prince George College (later known as O'Grady Catholic High School) was built and staffed by the Sisters of Mercy, of Ireland.

On July 13, 1963, Vicariate Apostolic of Prince Rupert was elevated to a diocese and changed its name to Diocese of Prince George. The administration moved from Prince Rupert to Prince George.

During the 1980 and 1990s, the diocese suffered financial setbacks. The diocese had to sell off property and its debt was paid off by 1996. Immigration Canada changed its rules around recruiting from other countries and the Frontier Apostolate, which helped bring immigration to the area, came to an end. Low registration also forced the closure of O'Grady Catholic High School in Prince George in 2001 and, in 2008, St. Joseph's elementary in Vanderhoof.

== Ordinaries ==
- Emile-Marie Bunoz, O.M.I. (1944–1945)
- Anthony Jordan, O.M.I. (1945–1955), appointed Coadjutor Archbishop of Edmonton, Alberta
- John Fergus O'Grady, O.M.I. (1955–1986)
- Hubert Patrick O'Connor, O.M.I. (1986–1991)
- Gerald William Wiesner, O.M.I. (1992-2013) - Bishop Emeritus
- Stephen Jensen (2013–present)

== Churches ==
Prince George

- Sacred Heart Cathedral
- Saint Mary's Parish
- Christ our Saviour Parish
- Immaculate Conception Parish
- St. Theresa’s Mission (Ft. Babine, Ft. Ware, TsayKeh, Takla)

Burns Lake

- Immaculata Parish
- Grassy Plains Mission

Chetwynd

- Our Lady of Peace Parish
- Holy Cross Mission (Tumbler Ridge)
- St. Theresa’s Mission (Camp Emile)

Dawson Creek

- Notre Dame Parish
- St. Anne Mission (Kelly Lake)

Fort St. James

- Our Lady of the Snows
- St. Cecilia Mission (Tache)
- Portage Mission

Fort St. John

- Church of the Resurrection
- Doig Mission
- Halfway Mission
- Blueberry Mission

Fraser Lake

- St. Andrew’s Parish
- Nadleh Mission
- Stellaquo Mission

Kitimat

- Christ the King Parish

McBride

- St. Patrick’s Parish

Mackenzie

- St. Peter’s Parish

New Hazelton

- St. Mary’s Parish
- St. Felix Mission, (Stewart)
- Holy Rosary Mission, (Moricetown)

Prince Rupert

- Annunciation Parish
- Our Lady of the Islands Mission (Queen Charlottes)

Smithers

- St. Joseph’s Parish
- St. Anthony’s Mission (Houston)

Terrace

- Sacred Heart Parish

Vanderhoof

- St. Joseph’s Parish
- Stoney Creek Mission

== Education ==
=== Catholic high schools ===
- O'Grady Catholic High School, of Prince George, was opened in 1960 and closed 2001.

=== Catholic elementary schools ===
School	City	Est.	Website
Sacred Heart	Prince George	1949	http://www.shspg.com/
Immaculate Conception	Prince George	1981	http://www.icschool.ca/
St. Mary’s	Prince George	1960	http://www.stmaryspg.org/
Notre Dame	Dawson Creek	1944	http://www.notredamedc.org/
St. Anthony’s	Kitimat	1957	http://www.stanthonysschoolkitimat.com/
Annunciation	Prince Rupert	1916	https://www.annunciationpr.ca/
St. Joseph’s	Smithers		n/a
Veritas	Terrace		http://www.sacredheartnews.ca/

== See also ==
- Lejac Residential School, the memorial site of Rose Prince.

== Notes ==
- The Northern Catholic News is published by the diocese for the community.
