= Diocese of Baie-Comeau =

Latin Catholic territory in Canada

Coordinates: 49.1896°N 68.2634°W

Diocese of Baie-Comeau Dioecesis Sinus Comoënsis
- Logo of the Diocese

Location
- Country: Canada
- Ecclesiastical province: Quebec

Statistics
- Population: Total; Catholics: (as of 2020); ▲108,150; ▲99,400 ( 91.9%)

Information
- Denomination: Catholic Church
- Sui iuris church: Latin Church
- Rite: Roman Rite
- Established: 1986
- Cathedral: St. John Eudes Cathedral, Baie-Comeau

Current leadership
- Pope: Leo XIV
- Bishop elect: Pierre Charland
- Bishops emeritus: Jean-Pierre Blais

Website
- diocese-bc.net

The Diocese of Baie-Comeau (Latin: Dioecesis Sinus Comoënsis) is a Latin Church diocese of the Catholic Church in Quebec, Canada. It was erected on 29 May 1882, as the Prefecture Apostolic of Golfe St-Laurent. It is a suffragan diocese of the Archdiocese of Rimouski. The organization is based in Baie-Comeau, Quebec.

== History ==
It was elevated as the Vicariate Apostolic of Golfe St-Laurent on 12 September 1905 and as the Diocese of Golfe St-Laurent on 24 November 1945. It became the Diocese of Hauterive in 1960 then the Diocese of Baie-Comeau in 1986, following the fusion of Hauterive and Baie-Comeau in 1982.

== Ordinaries ==
- François-Xavier Bossé (1882–1892)
- Michel-Thomas Labrecque (1892–1903)
- Gustave Maria Blanche, C.I.M. (1905–1916)
- Patrice Alexandre Chiasson, C.I.M. (1917–1920), appointed Bishop of Chatham, New Brunswick
- Julien-Marie Leventoux, C.I.M. (1922–1938)
- Napoléon-Alexandre Labrie, C.I.M. (1938–1956)
- Gérard Couturier (1956–1974)
- Jean-Guy Couture (1975–1979), appointed Bishop of Chicoutimi, Québec
- Roger Ébacher (1979–1988), appointed Bishop of Gatineau-Hull, Québec
- Maurice Couture, R.S.V. (1988–1990), appointed Archbishop of Québec
- Joseph Paul Pierre Morissette (1990–2008), appointed Bishop of Saint-Jérôme, Québec
- Jean-Pierre Blais (2008–2025)
- Pierre Charland, O.F.M. (2025–present)

== Territorial losses ==
Year	Along with	To form
1945	Vicariate Apostolic of Golfe St-Laurent; Diocese of Harbour Grace	Vicariate Apostolic of Labrador
