= Mesarfelta =

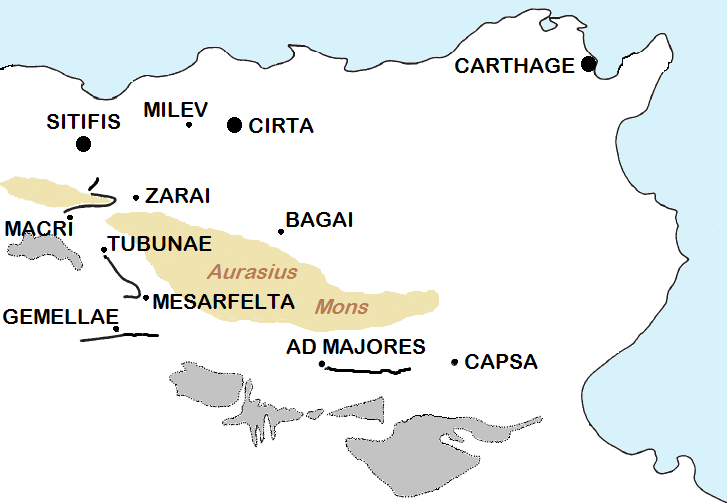
Mesarfelta was located on the "Limes romanus" called Fossatum Africae

Mesarfelta was a Roman–Berber town in the province of Numidia. It was also a bishopric that is included in the Catholic Church's list of titular sees.

== History ==
The historic Mesarfelta is believed to be what are now the ruins of El-Outaïa or those of Tolga, Henchir-El-Ksar, or may be Qastilya in Algeria (according to "Three North-African Topographical Notes (Islamic-Roman)").

The city is believed to have been constructed as a fortification by the Romans (with annexed "vicus"), in the second half of the first century near the Aures Mountains. It had an amphitheatre during Hadrians reign.

A barrier called Fossatum Africae, which marked the frontier between the territory of the Roman Empire and other lands, ran through Mesarfelta.

The city disappeared after the Muslim conquest in the second half of the 7th century.

== Bishopric ==
The city of Mesarfelta was the seat of an ancient bishopric There are two Mesarfelta bishops historically remembered both in the Council of Carthage (411).

=== Ancient bishops ===
- "Lucianus"(Catholic) and "Bennatus"(Donatist).

=== Titular bishops of Mesarfelta ===
- William Edward McManus 1967–1976
- Louis-Albert Vachon 1977–1981
- Basile Tapsoba 1981–1984
- Joseph Paul Pierre Morissette 1987–1990
- Michael Angelo Saltarelli 1990–1995
- Antonio Menegazzo, M.C.C.I. 1995–2019

== See also ==
- Mauretania Caesariensis
- Caesarea
- Thamugadi
- Lambaesis

== Bibliography ==
- J. Baradez (1949). Gemellae. Un camp d'Hadrien et une ville aux confins sahariens aujourd’hui ensevelis sous les sables. Revue Africaine v. 93 p. 1-24.
- P. Trousset (2002). Les limites sud de la réoccupation Byzantine. Antiquité Tardive v. 10, p. 143-150.
