= Catholic Church in Canada =

- French: Église catholique au Canada; Latin: Ecclesia catholica in Canada
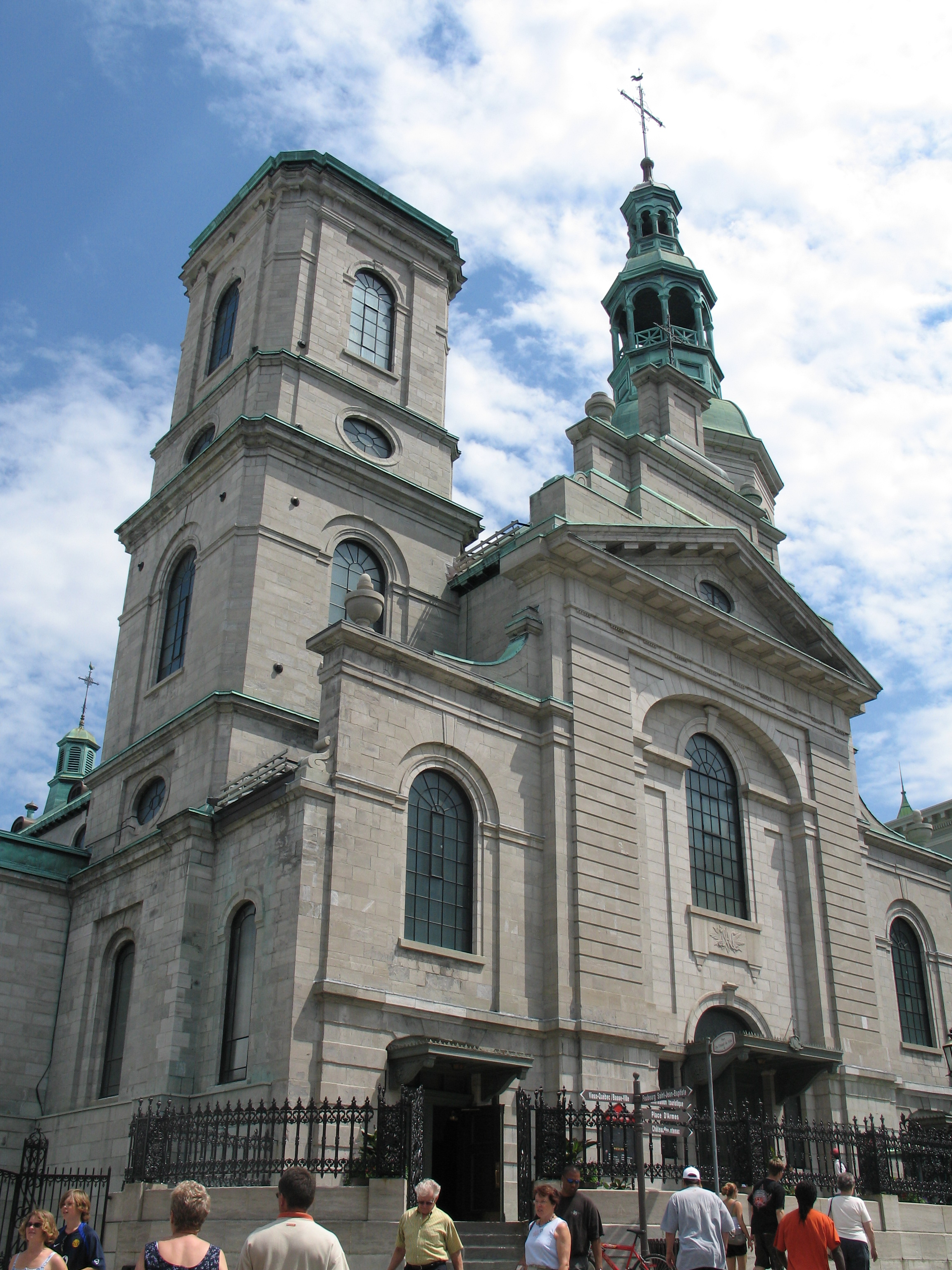
- Cathedral-Basilica of Notre-Dame de Québec
- Type: National polity
- Classification: Catholic
- Orientation: Latin
- Scripture: Bible
- Theology: Catholic theology
- Polity: Episcopal
- Governance: CCCB
- Pope: Leo XIV
- President: William McGrattan
- Primate: Gérald Lacroix
- Apostolic Nuncio: Ivan Jurkovič
- Associations: Canadian Council of Churches
- Region: Canada
- Language: English, French, Latin
- Headquarters: Ottawa, Canada
- Origin: 11th century, Vinland
- Members: 29.9% of Canadians (10,880,360 as of 2021)
- Official website: www.cccb.ca

The Catholic Church in Canada is part of the worldwide Catholic Church and has a decentralised structure, meaning each diocesan bishop is autonomous but under the spiritual leadership of the Pope and the Canadian Conference of Catholic Bishops. As of 2021, it has the largest number of adherents to a Christian denomination or religion in Canada, with 29.4% of Canadians (10.8 million) being adherents according to the census in 2021.

== History ==
=== First Catholics in Canada ===
The first Catholic to set foot in Canada was Norse explorer Leif Erikson in the 11th century in Vinland, modern day Newfoundland. It is highly probable that Catholic masses were held in Vinland during settlement by the Norse. In 1497, when John Cabot landed on the island of Newfoundland on the Avalon Peninsula, he raised the Venetian and Papal banners and claimed the land for his sponsor King Henry VII of England, while recognizing the religious authority of the Catholic Church. A letter of John Day states that Cabot landed on 24 June 1497 and "he landed at only one spot of the mainland, near the place where land was first sighted, and they disembarked there with a crucifix and raised banners with the arms of the Holy Father and those of the King of England". On his third voyage in 1498, he may have been accompanied by Father Giovanni Antonio de Carbonariis, who may have established a missionary church at Carbonear on the Avalon Peninsula.

Missionary work among Indigenous peoples began in the early 1610s as a stipulated condition to the colonization projects of the King of France. Historian Robert Choquette credits secular priest Jessé Fleché as the first to perform dozens of baptisms on Indigenous peoples, which impacted the religious landscape of Mi'kma'ki. Jessé Fleché's ministry was criticized by Jesuits who believed Fleché erred in baptizing neophytes without teaching them the Catholic faith beforehand. In 1611, the Society of Jesus started its missionary work in Acadia. Unlike their predecessor, the Jesuits began their work on Mi'kma'ki by learning the local language and living alongside the Mi'kmaq in order to instruct and convert them to Catholicism.

In 1620, George Calvert, 1st Baron Baltimore purchased a tract of land in Newfoundland from Sir William Vaughan and established a colony, calling it Avalon, after the legendary spot where Christianity was introduced to Britain. In 1627 Calvert brought two Catholic priests to Avalon. This was the first continuous Catholic ministry in British North America. Despite the severe religious conflicts of the period, Calvert secured the right of Catholics to practice their religion unimpeded in Newfoundland, and embraced the novel principle of religious tolerance, which he wrote into the Charter of Avalon and the later Charter of Maryland. The Colony of Avalon was thus the first North American jurisdiction to practice religious tolerance.

=== British Rule in Canada ===
In the wake of the Canada Conquest in 1759, New France became a British colony. Nevertheless, the Catholic Church continued to grow in Canada due to the flexibility imposed on the British regime in Canada by the Treaty of Paris (1763) on sovereigns of the United Kingdom who allowed the favour of the protection of Catholicism and French-speaking people in Canada. This historical perspective still influences Canadian society today.

In 1908, Canada, along with the United States and five Western European countries, were removed from the Propaganda Fide's jurisdiction and placed under a separate hierarchy.

=== Anti-Catholicism ===
Fears of the Catholic Church were quite strong in the 19th century, especially among Presbyterian and other Protestant Irish immigrants across Canada. In 1853, the Gavazzi Riots left 10 dead in Quebec in the wake of Catholic Irish protest against anti-Catholic speeches by ex-monk Alessandro Gavazzi.

The major flashpoint was public support for Catholic French language schools. Although the Confederation Agreement of 1867 guaranteed the status of Catholic schools where they had been legalized, disputes erupted in numerous provinces, especially in the Manitoba Schools Question in the 1890s and Ontario in the 1910s. In Ontario, Regulation 17 was a regulation by the Ontario Ministry of Education, that restricted the use of French as a language of instruction to the first two years of schooling. French Canada reacted vehemently and resisted the implementation of the Regulation. This conflict, which was first rooted in linguistic and cultural questions, transformed into a religious divide. In 1915, Ontario clergy was divided between French Canadian and Irish allegiances, with the Irish supporting the position of the provincial government. Pope Benedict XV asked his Canadian representative to study the divide in order to reestablish unity among the Catholic church in the province of Ontario. Regulation 17 is among the reasons why French Canada distanced itself from the war effort, as its young men refused to enlist.

Protestant elements succeeded in blocking the growth of French-language Catholic public schools. The Irish Catholics generally supported the English language position advocated by the Protestants. Despite this, French language education in Ontario continues today in Catholic and public schools.

=== French versus Irish ===
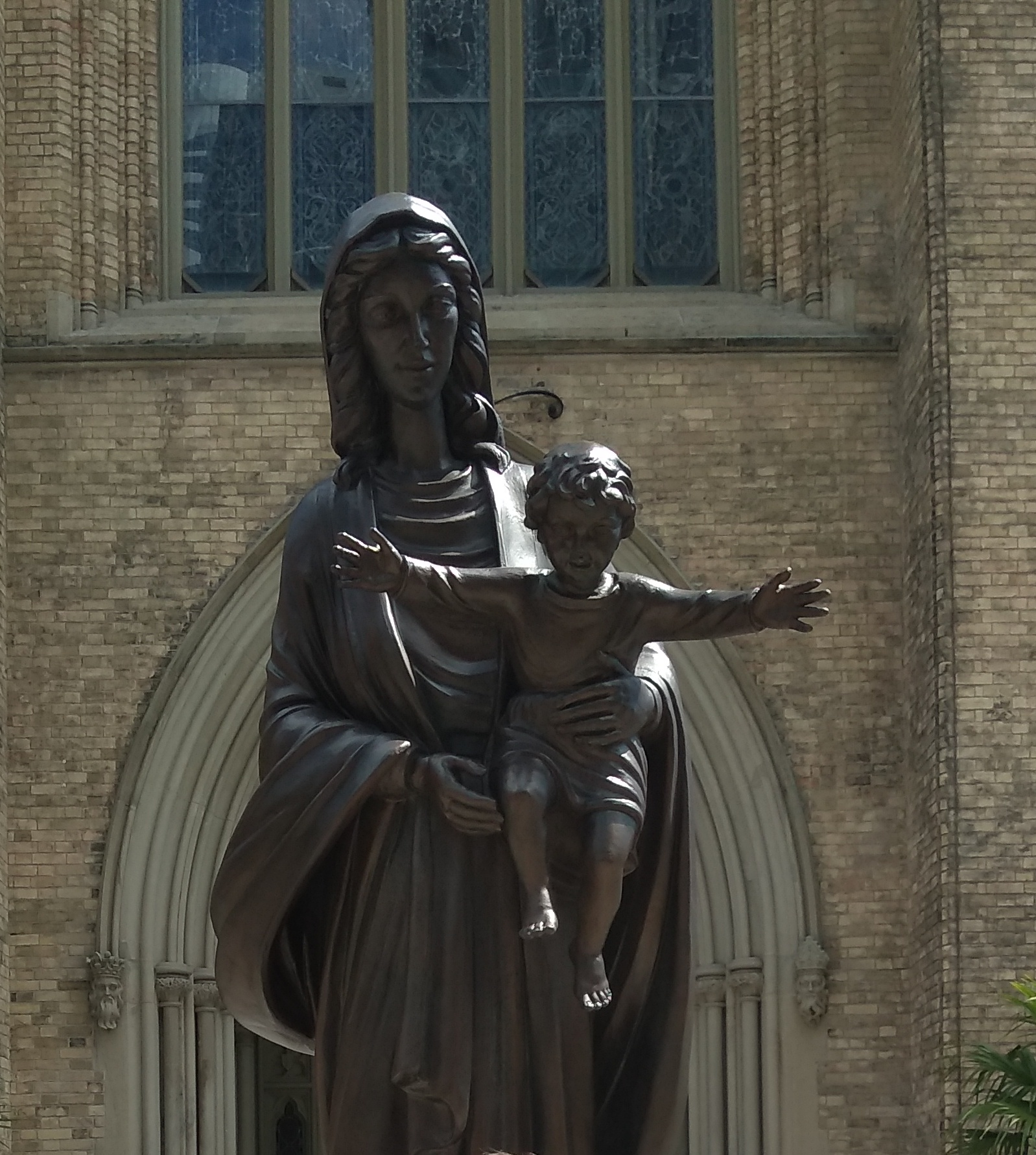
Statue of Mary and Christ child outside St. Michael's Cathedral in Toronto

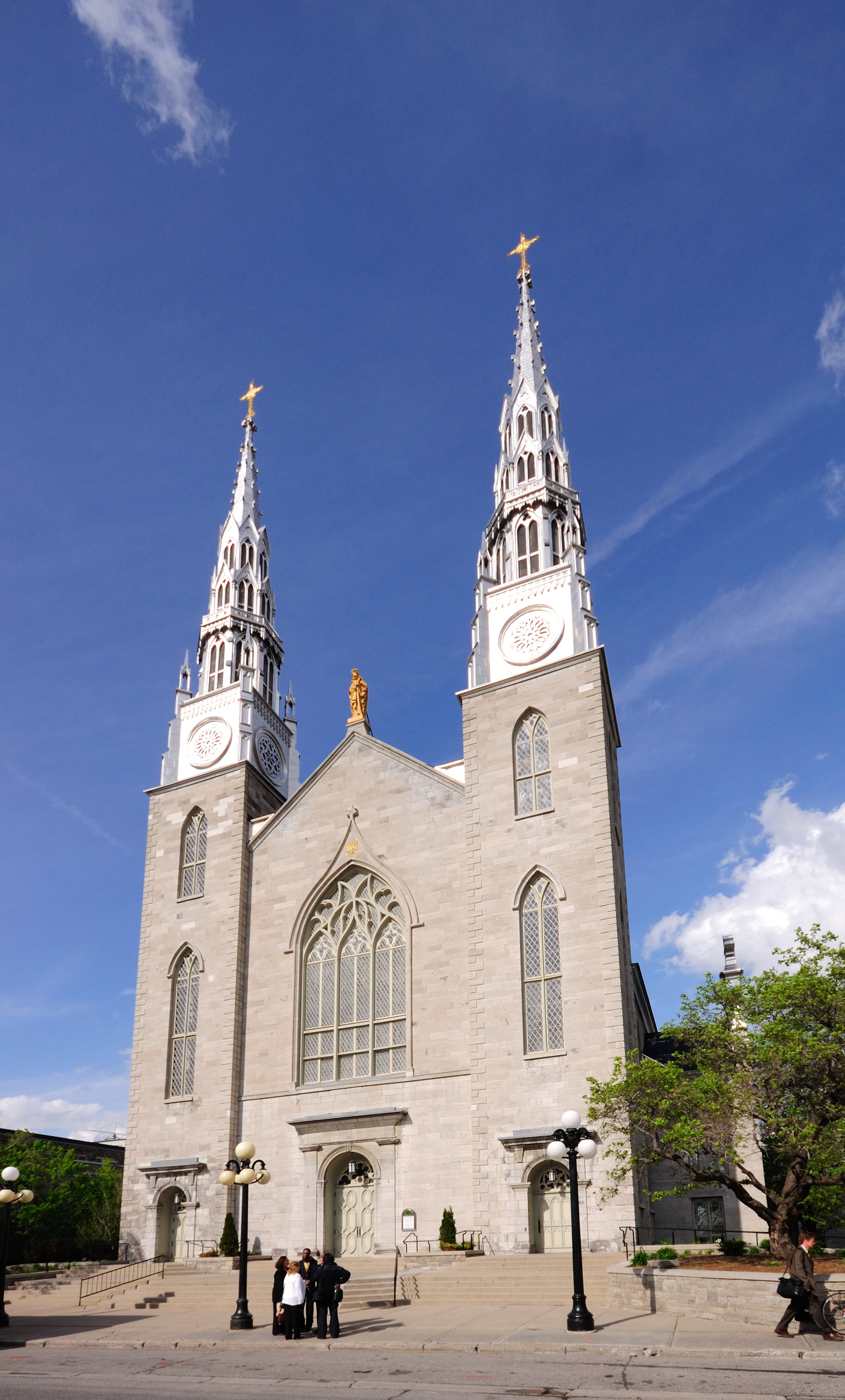
Notre-Dame Cathedral Basilica, Ottawa

The central theme of Catholic history from the 1840s through the 1920s was the contest for control of the church between the French Canadians, based in Quebec, and the English-speaking Irish Canadians (along with smaller numbers of Catholic Scottish Canadians, English, and others) based in Ontario. The French Catholics saw Catholics in general as God's chosen people (versus Protestants) and the French as more truly Catholic than any other ethnic group. The fact that the Irish Catholics formed coalition with the anti-French Protestants further infuriated the French.

The Irish Catholics collaborated with Protestants inside Canada, on the school issue: they opposed French language Catholic schools. The Irish had a significant advantage since they were favoured by the Vatican. Irish Catholicism was "ultramontane", which meant its adherents professed total obedience to the Pope. By contrast, the French bishops in Canada kept their distance from the Vatican. In the form of Regulation 17 this became the central issue that finally alienated the French in Quebec from the Canadian Anglophone establishment during the First World War. Ontario's Catholics were led by the Irish Bishop Fallon, who united with the Protestants in opposing French schools. Regulation 17 was repealed in 1927. The French-speakers remain more liberal than the English-speakers to this day, and in addition are also leaving the faith much more quickly.

One by one, the Irish took control of the church in each province except for Quebec. Tensions were especially high in Manitoba at the end of the 19th century. In Alberta in the 1920s, a new Irish bishop undermined French language Catholic schooling, and removed the Francophile order of teaching sisters.

=== Newfoundland ===
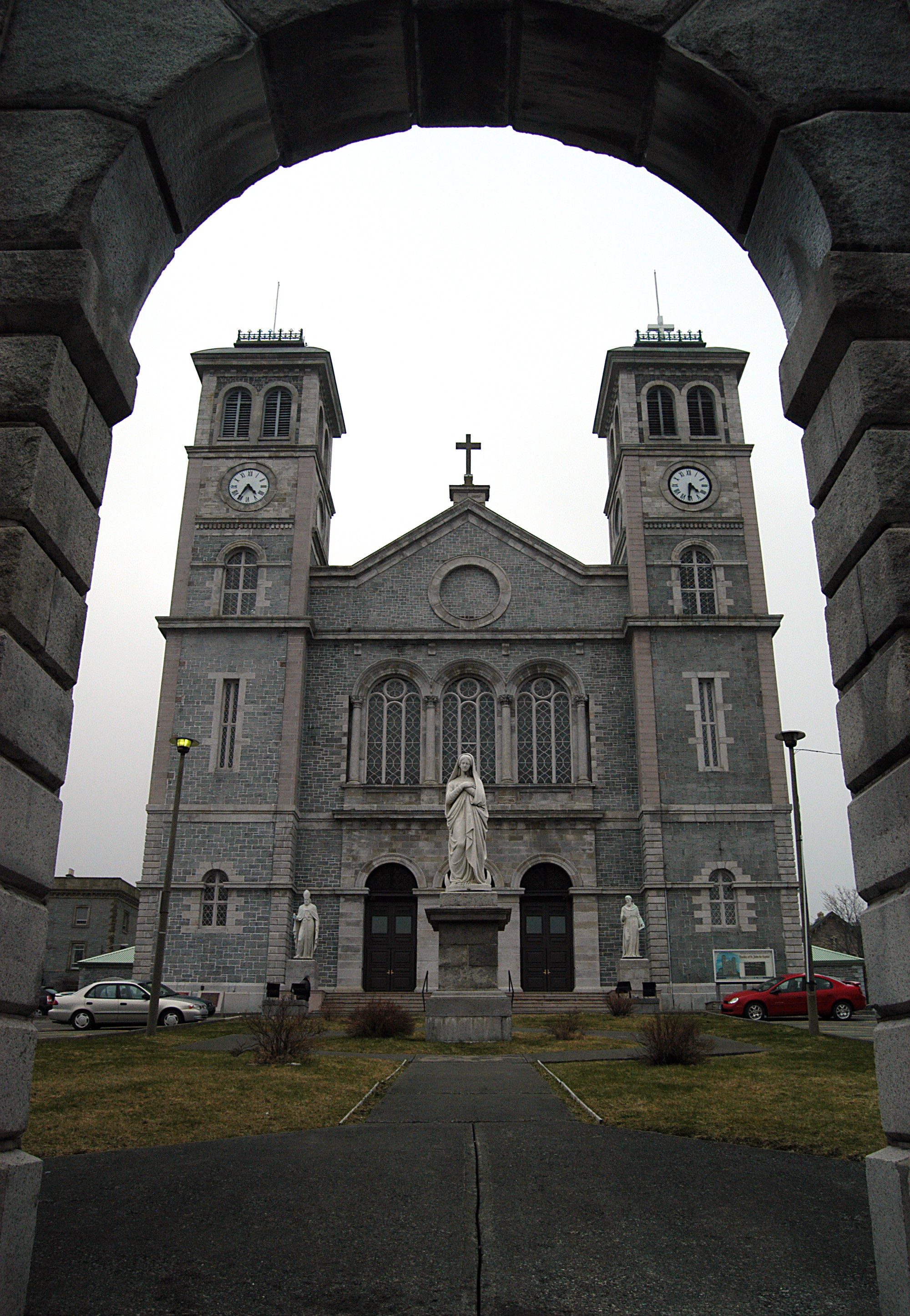
Basilica of St. John the Baptist, St. John's

In the Dominion of Newfoundland (which was an independent dominion before joining Canada in 1949), politics was polarized around religious lines, with the Protestants confronting the Irish Catholics.

The future Archdiocese of St. John's was established on 30 May 1784 as Catholics in Newfoundland gradually gained religious liberty, made explicit by a public declaration by Governor John Campbell. After a request from Irish merchants in St. John's to Bishop William Egan, Bishop of Waterford and Lismore, James Louis O'Donel was appointed Prefect Apostolic of Newfoundland. This was the first Roman Catholic ecclesiastical jurisdiction established in English-speaking North America.

In 1861, the Protestant governor dismissed the Catholic Liberals from office and the ensuing election was marked by riot and disorder with both the Anglican bishop Edward Feild and Catholic bishop John Thomas Mullock taking partisan stances. The Protestants narrowly elected Hugh Hoyles as the Conservative Prime Minister. Hoyles suddenly reversed his long record of militant Protestant activism and worked to defuse tensions. He shared patronage and power with the Catholics; all jobs and patronage were split between the various religious bodies on a per capita basis. This 'denominational compromise' was further extended to education when all religious schools were put on the basis which the Catholics had enjoyed since the 1840s.

A series of sexual abuse incidents at Mount Cashel Orphanage, a home for boys run by the Congregation of Christian Brothers, and a police coverup were disclosed in 1989, resulting in the closure of the facility in 1990 after the last resident was moved to an alternate facility. The property was seized and the site razed and sold for real-estate development in the mid-1990s as part of a court settlement ordering financial compensation to the victims.

Newfoundland's denominational schools were funded by the province until the late 1990s. In the fall of 1998, Newfoundland officially adopted a non-denominational school system, following two referendums and judgements by the Supreme Court of Newfoundland and its Court of Appeal that constitutionally recognized the end of provincially-funded all religious denominational schools.

In July 2021, the Roman Catholic Archdiocese of St. John's, Newfoundland announced plans to sell off assets in order to compensate victims of the Mount Cashel sex abuse scandal.

=== Recent events ===
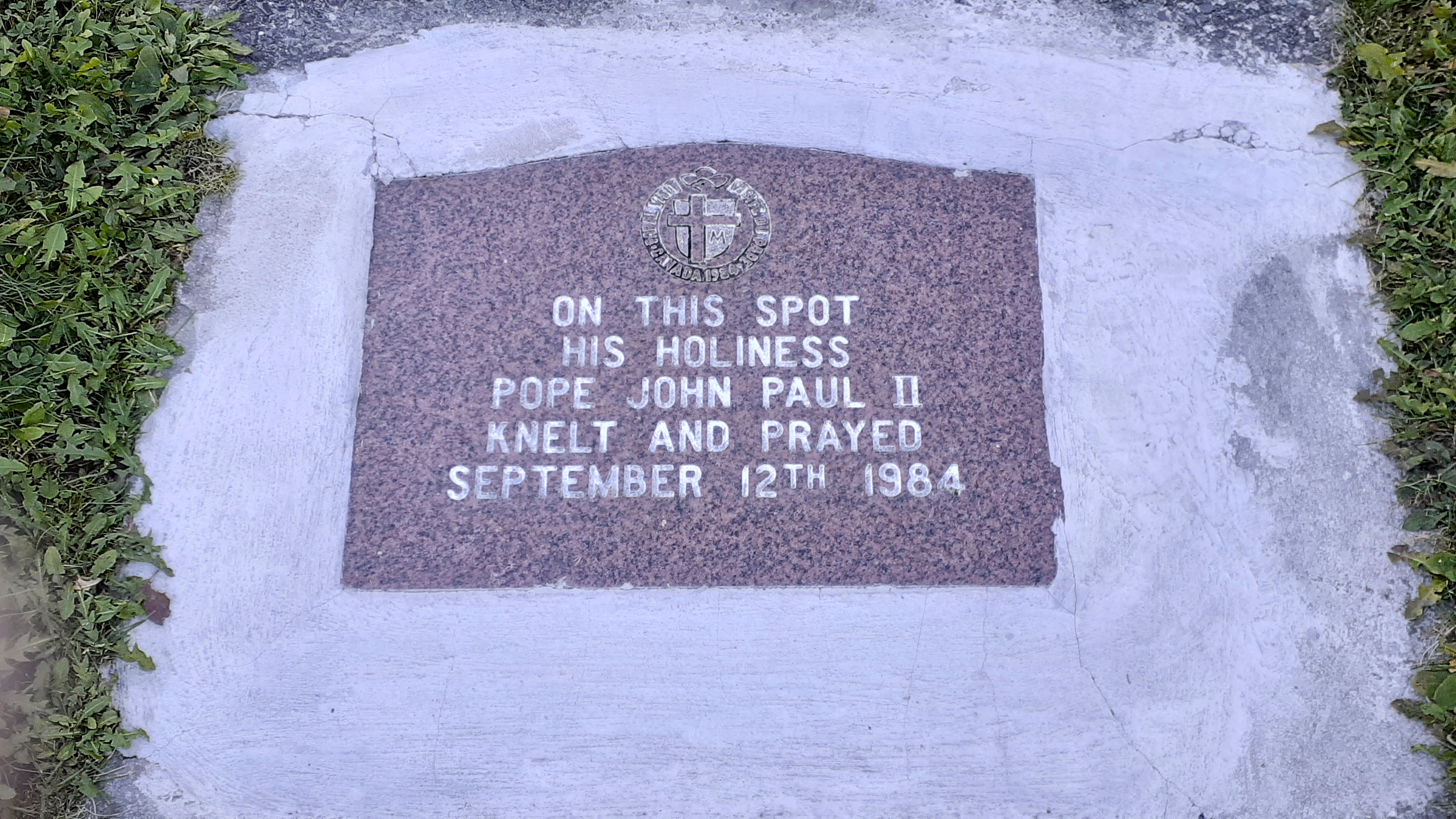
Pope John Paul II prayed at Our Lady of Lourdes Grotto in 1984.

==== Papal visits ====
In 1984, John Paul II became the first pope to visit Canada. He would visit the country for a total of three times, his final visit being for World Youth Day 2002 in Toronto. Pope Francis visited in July 2022 to apologize in the wake of the Residential schools scandal.

==== Decline and recovery ====
Between 2001 and 2013, the population of Canadians identifying as Catholic remained relatively stagnant, with roughly 12.8 million Canadians self-reporting as Catholic. However, Catholics remained the largest single Christian group in Canada. Church attendance across the Canadian Catholic Church declined as society became more irreligious, which resulted in the closures of a number of churches in all provinces and territories in the country. On a normal Sunday, between 15 and 25 percent of Canada's Catholics attended Mass in 2014 (15 per cent weekly attenders and another nine per cent monthly). In Quebec, there was a reported rise in adult baptisms and an increased number of baptisms of people over the age of 7 in 2025. The Catholic Church of Quebec described the increase in baptisms among adults and adolescents in 2025 as a "surprising phenomenon has been gaining momentum" and that interest in baptism in the Catholic faith is "especially present" in young people and in adults from immigrant backgrounds. In 2026 on Holy Saturday, it was reported that young people in Quebec are joining the Quebec Catholic Church due to the presence of priests and young influencers on social media platforms such as Tik Tok and Instagram. Other reasons for young people in Quebec joining the Quebec Catholic Church was reported to be due to many young Quebecers taking an interest in Quebec's religious heritage so that they could "understand their identity." In 2026, the Roman Catholic Diocese of Calgary reported a 50% increase in the number of people wanting to join the church since the COVID-19 pandemic, with Church’s Rite of Christian Initiation of Adults instructor Brian Trafford saying that the Diocese saw a record number of converts in both 2025 and 2026.

==== Indian schools scandal ====
The Catholic church ran three-quarters of the 130 Indian schools in Canada, in which more than 150,000 Indigenous children were forced to attend Christian schools with the aim of assimilating them into Canadian society. Disease and hunger was common, and physical and sexual abuse took place, often at the hands of priests and Catholic laypeople. The church agreed to pay C$29m in compensation to survivors, but has distributed only C$3.9m, citing poor fundraising efforts. During roughly that same period, however, the church raised C$300m for the construction of new church buildings, including cathedrals, and had more than C$4bn in assets.

Prime minister Justin Trudeau expressed frustration that Pope Francis declined to offer an apology for the Catholic church's role in residential schools.

"As a Catholic, I am deeply disappointed by the position that the Catholic church has taken now and over the past many years. We expect the church to step up and take responsibility for its role in this and be there to help with the grieving and healing, including with records".

Ground penetrating radar has since discovered more than 1,300 alleged unmarked mass graves at former Indian schools. Four out of five were run by the Catholic Church. The resurfacing of the residential schools and gravesites, combined with the sexual abuse scandals, has led some Canadians to leave the church.

Bishop Donald Bolen, of Regina, said in 2022 that Catholic involvement in the residential school system had caused deep wounds and trauma. "Relations between First Nation Peoples and the Catholic Church in Canada carry the burden of a complicated history that people are still grappling with. Colonisation and the government-funded Residential Schools System left First Nations Peoples [the earliest known inhabitants] with a legacy of marginalisation, where their languages, cultures, traditions and spirituality were suppressed. Catholic involvement in this system, and the waves of suffering experienced by so many Indigenous Peoples, including physical, cultural, spiritual and sexual abuses, have left deep wounds and trauma. There is much that the Catholic Church, the Canadian government, and society are accountable for." In 2022, during a visit to Canada, Pope Francis apologised for church members' role in the scandal.

==== 2021 church burnings ====
Following the increased public awareness of the alleged graves and residential schools, four Catholic churches on First Nations reserves in western Canada were destroyed by fires that investigators regarded as suspicious. Other churches were damaged by fire and vandalism over June and July 2021, with the burnings drawing condemnation from both the Catholic Church and Canadian indigenous figures.

== Population ==
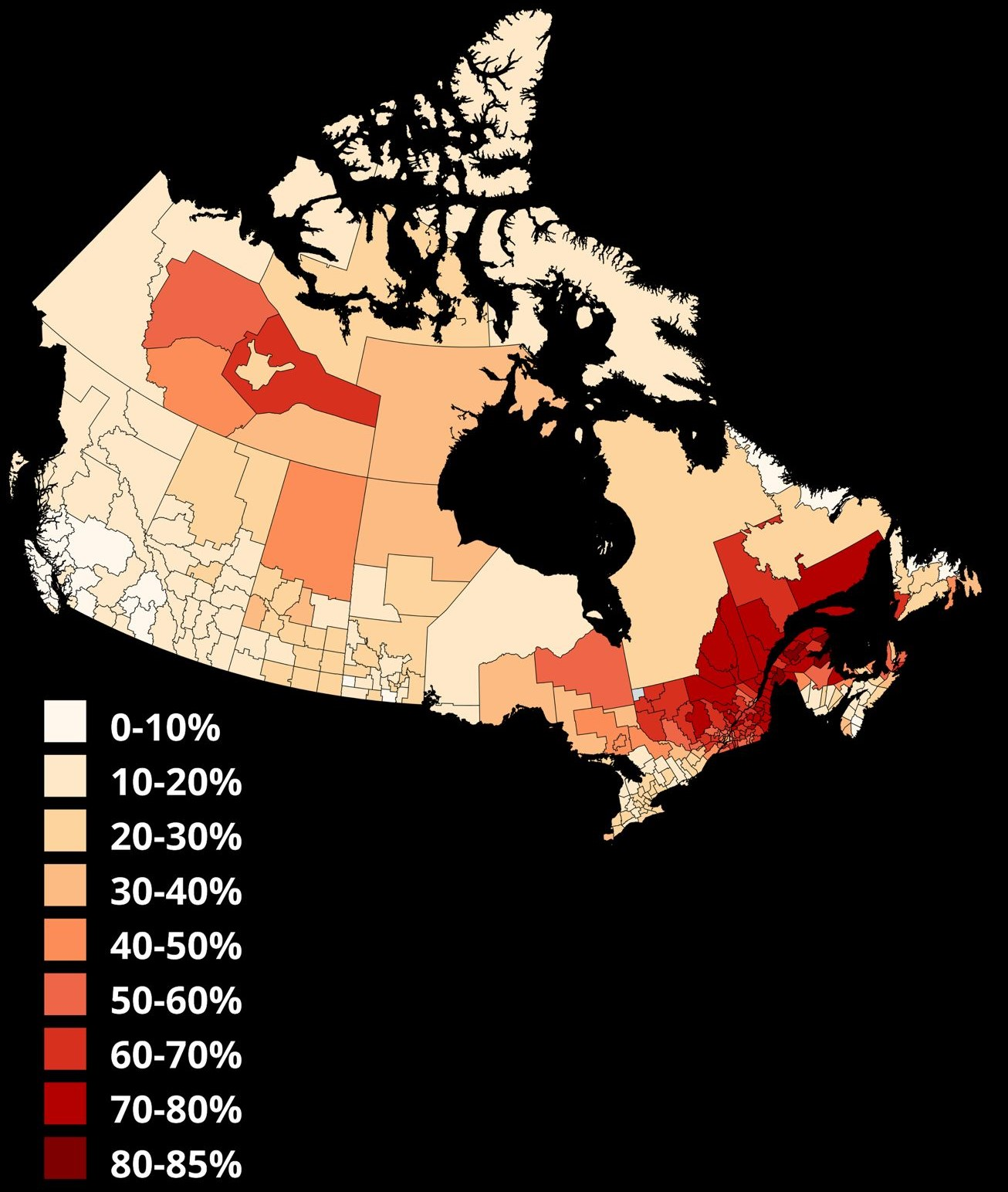
Population distribution of Catholic Canadians by census division, 2021 census

The Catholic population in Canada in 2001, 2011, and 2021.

Historical population
Year	Pop.	±%
1871	1,532,471	—
1881	1,791,982	+16.9%
1891	1,992,017	+11.2%
1901	2,229,600	+11.9%
1911	2,833,041	+27.1%
1921	3,389,626	+19.6%
1931	4,102,960	+21.0%
1941	4,806,431	+17.1%
1951	6,069,496	+26.3%
1961	8,342,826	+37.5%
1971	9,974,895	+19.6%
1981	11,210,385	+12.4%
1991	12,203,620	+8.9%
2001	12,936,910	+6.0%
2011	12,810,705	−1.0%
2021	10,880,360	−15.1%

Province	2001	2011	2021	% Change 2001–2011	% Change 2011–2021	% 2001	% 2011	% 2021	% Change 2001–2011	% Change 2011–2021
Quebec	5,939,715	5,775,745	4,472,555	-2.8%	-22.6%	83.4%	74.6%	53.8%	-8.8%	-20.8%
Ontario	3,911,760	3,976,605	3,654,825	+1.7%	-8.1%	34.7%	31.4%	26.0%	-3.3%	-5.4%
Alberta	786,365	866,305	833,025	+10.2%	-3.8%	26.7%	24.3%	20.0%	-2.4%	-4.3%
British Columbia	675,320	650,360	588,140	-2.5%	-9.6%	17.5%	15.0%	12.0%	-2.5%	-3.0%
New Brunswick	386,045	366,115	305,520	-5.2%	-16.6%	53.6%	49.8%	40.2%	-3.8%	-9.6%
Nova Scotia	328,695	298,275	245,305	-9.3%	-17.8%	36.6%	32.9%	25.7%	-3.7%	-7.2%
Manitoba	323,690	309,450	276,925	-4.4%	-10.5%	29.3%	26.4%	21.2%	-2.9%	-5.2%
Saskatchewan	305,385	297,865	265,530	-2.5%	-10.9%	31.7%	29.5%	24.1%	-2.2%	-5.4%
Newfoundland and Labrador	187,445	181,585	159,875	-3.1%	-12.0%	36.9%	35.8%	31.8%	-1.1%	-4.0%
Prince Edward Island	63,270	58,895	51,790	-6.9%	-12.1%	47.4%	42.9%	34.4%	-4.5%	-8.5%
Northwest Territories	16,990	15,800	12,935	-7.0%	-18.1%	45.8%	38.7%	32.0%	-7.1%	-6.7%
Nunavut	6,215	7,585	8,235	+22.0%	+8.6%	23.3%	23.9%	22.5%	+0.6%	-1.4%
Yukon	6,015	6,120	5,690	+1.7%	-7.0%	21.1%	18.4%	14.4%	-2.7%	-4.0%
Canada	12,936,905	12,810,705	10,880,360	-1.0%	-15.1%	43.6%	39.0%	29.9%	-4.6%	-9.1%

The Catholic population underwent its first recorded drop between 2001 and 2011. Notable trends include the de-Catholicization of Quebec, a drop in the Catholic population in small provinces with stagnant populations, and a rise in Catholics in the large English-speaking provinces of Ontario, British Columbia, and Alberta. There are also adherents of Eastern Catholic Churches who had already migrated to Canada, most notably the Ukrainians.

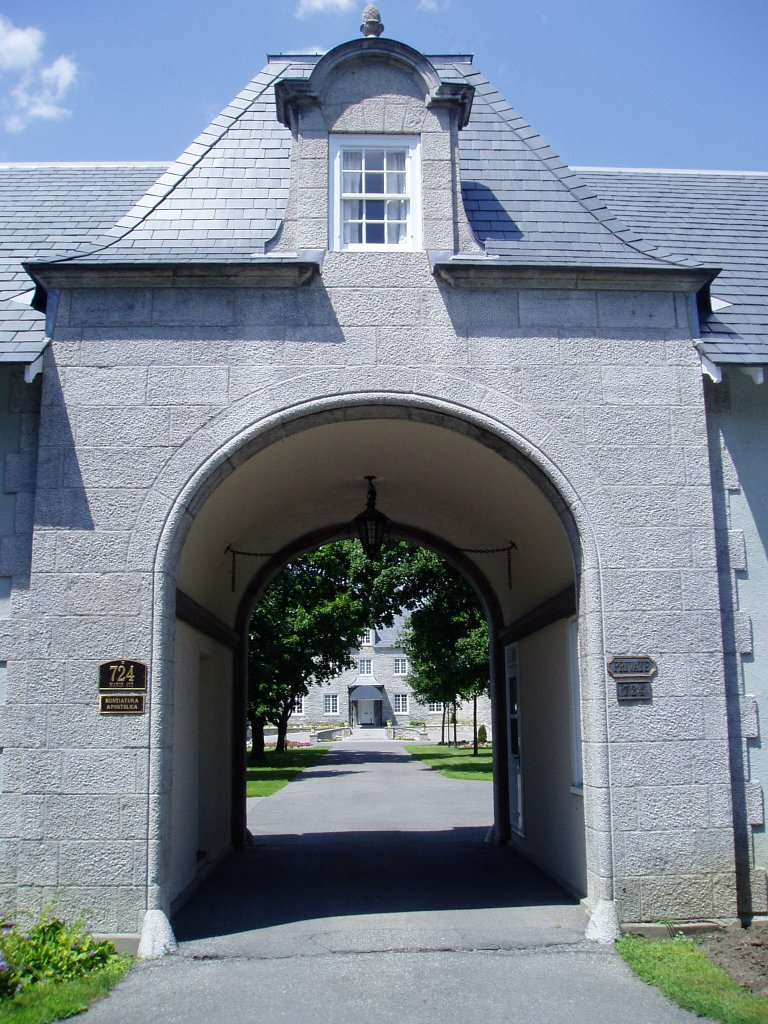
The Pope is represented in Canada by the Apostolic Nunciature to Canada (Ottawa).

== Organization ==
The Catholic Community in Canada is decentralised, meaning each diocesan bishop is autonomous and is related but not accountable to the Canadian Conference of Catholic Bishops (CCCB). According to the Canadian Conference of Catholic Bishops, Canada is divided in four Episcopal assemblies: the Atlantic Episcopal Assembly, the Assemblée des évêques catholiques du Québec, the Assembly of Catholic Bishops of Ontario and the Assembly of Western Catholic Bishops. The Pope is represented in Canada by the Apostolic Nunciature to Canada (Ottawa).

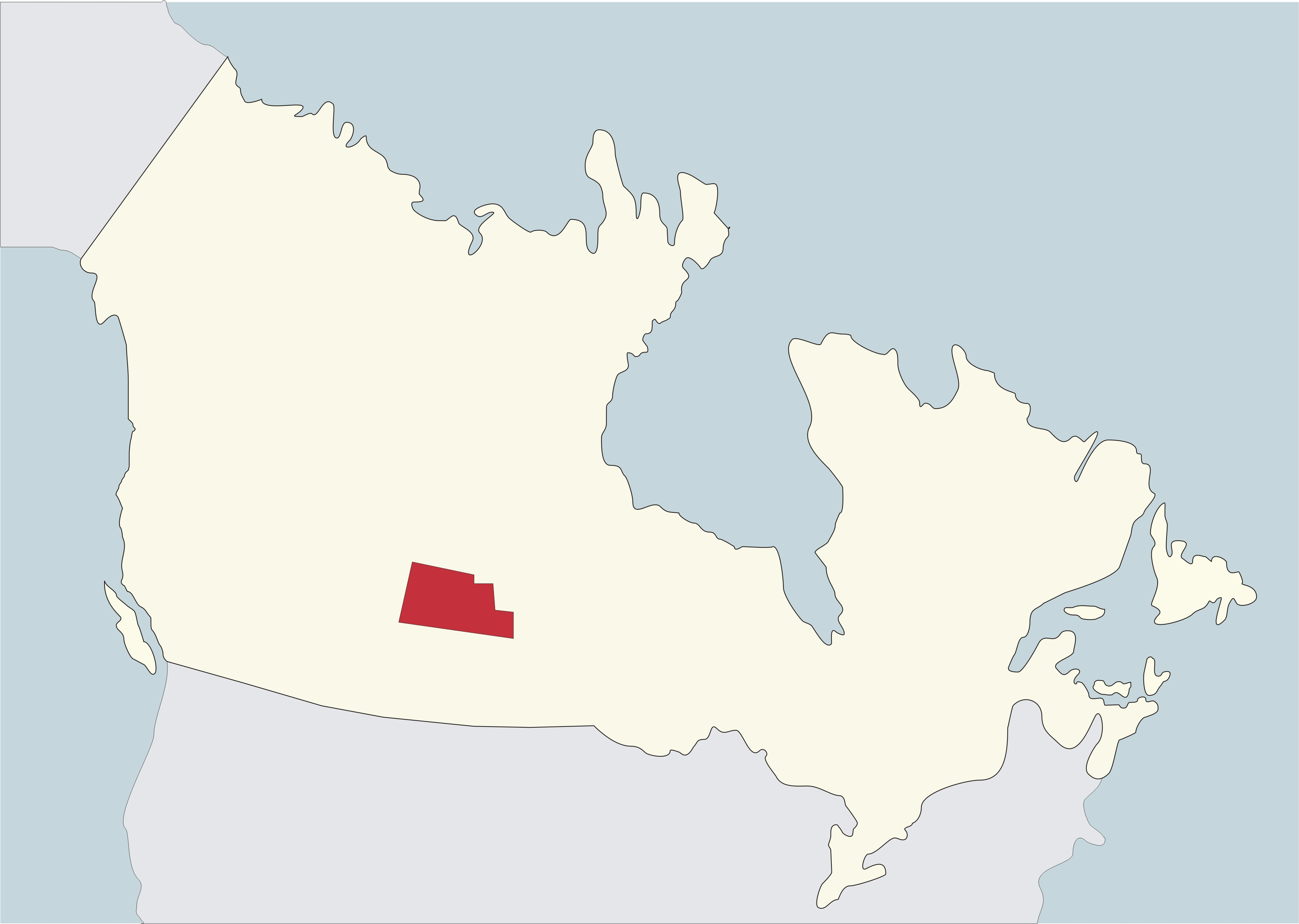
Diocese of Prince-Albert.

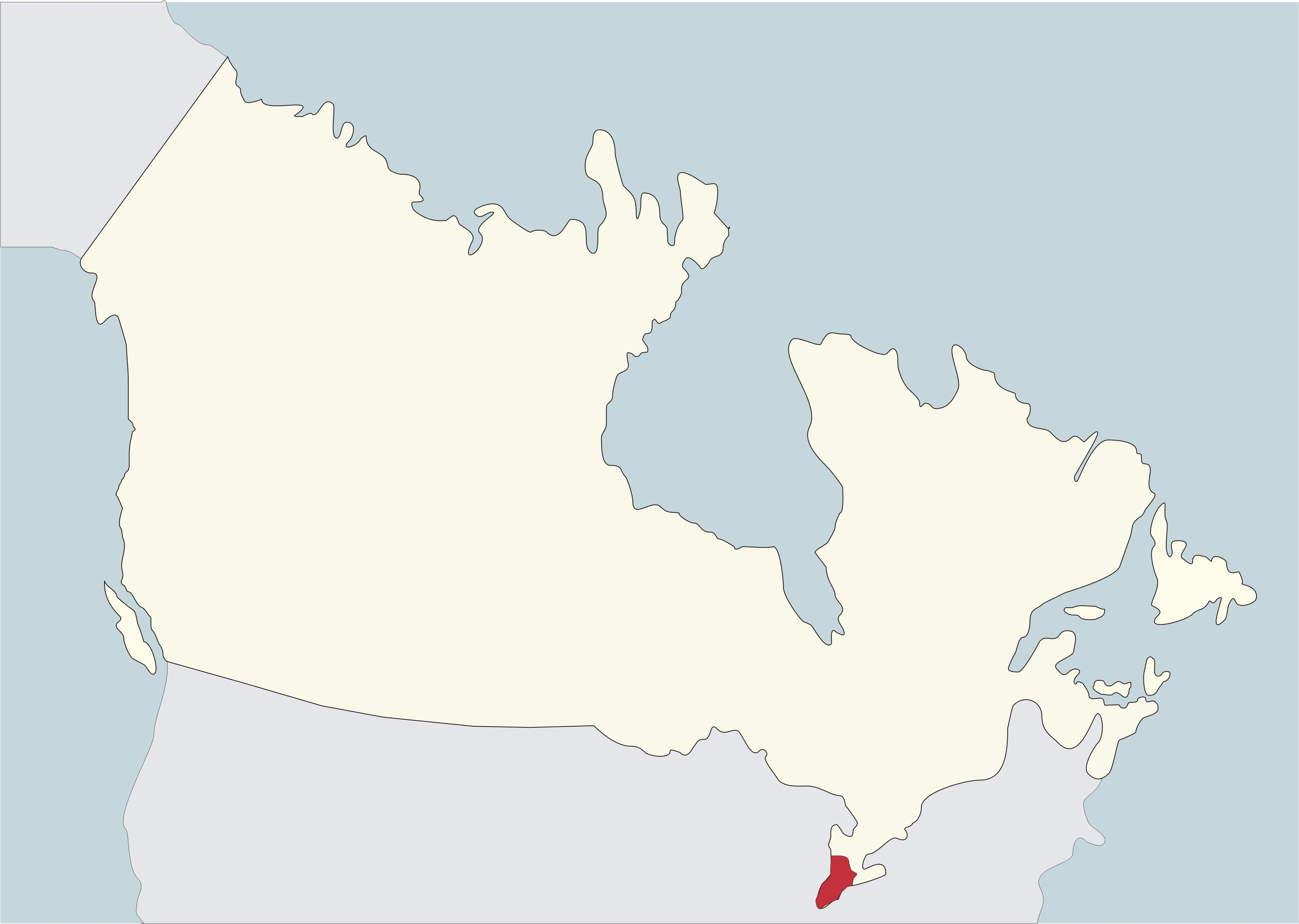
Diocese of London.

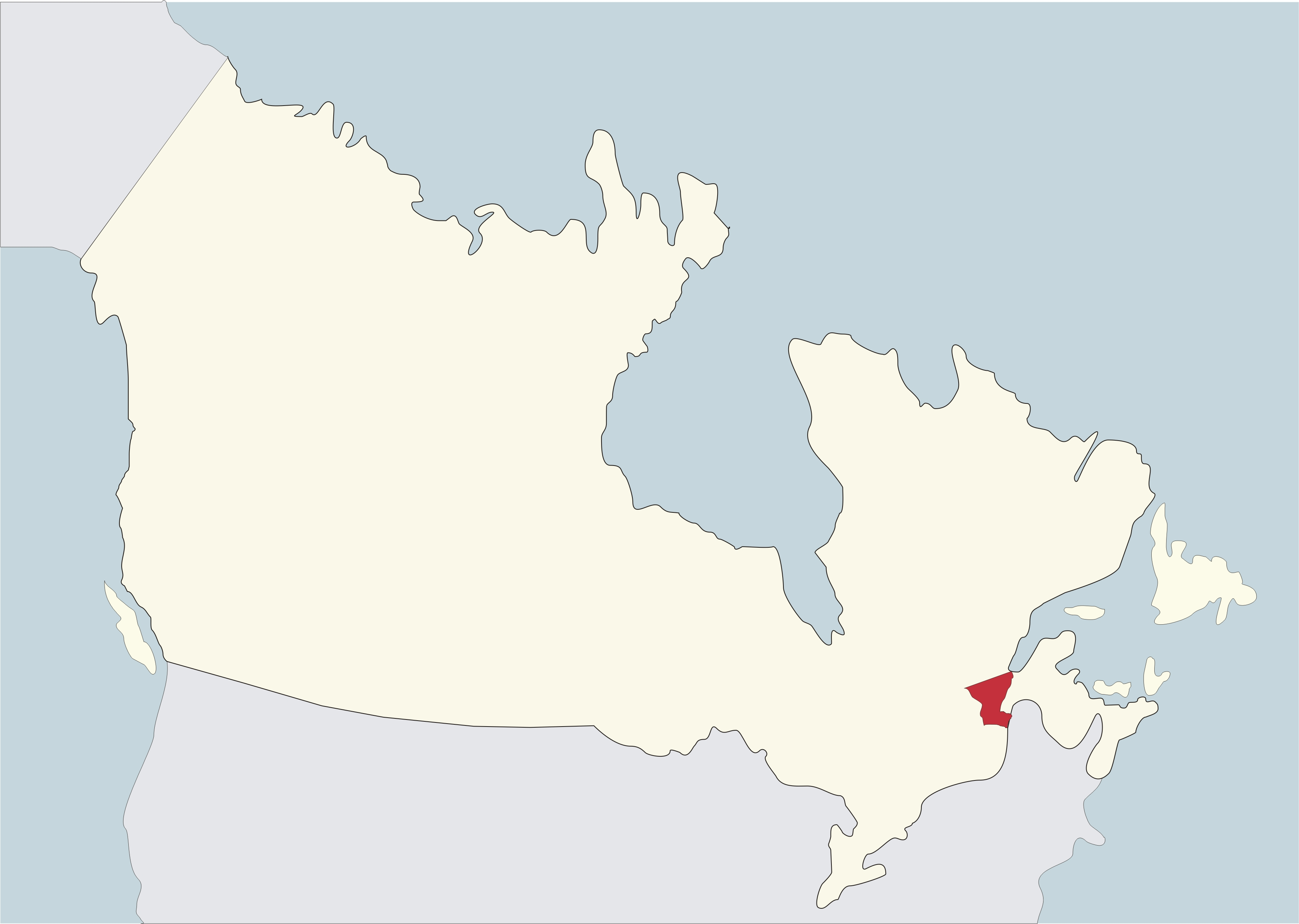
Archdiocese of Québec.

Military Ordinariate of Canada

Within Canada, the Latin hierarchy consists of:

- Archdiocese
  - Diocese

- Edmonton
  - Calgary
  - Saint Paul
- Gatineau
  - Amos
  - Mont-Laurier
  - Rouyn-Noranda
- Grouard-McLennan
  - Mackenzie-Fort Smith
  - Whitehorse
- Halifax-Yarmouth
  - Antigonish
  - Charlottetown
- Keewatin-Le-Pas
  - Churchill-Baie d'Hudson
- Kingston
  - Peterborough
  - Sault Sainte Marie
- Moncton
  - Bathurst
  - Edmundston
  - Saint John
- Montréal
  - Joliette
  - Saint-Jean-Longueuil
  - Saint-Jérôme
  - Valleyfield
- Ottawa-Cornwall
  - Hearst–Moosonee
  - Pembroke
  - Timmins
- Québec
  - Chicoutimi
  - Sainte-Anne-de-la-Pocatière
  - Trois-Rivières
- Regina
  - Prince-Albert
  - Saskatoon
- Rimouski
  - Baie-Comeau
  - Gaspé
- Saint-Boniface
- St. John's
  - Grand Falls
  - Corner Brook and Labrador
- Sherbrooke
  - Nicolet
  - Saint-Hyacinthe
- Toronto
  - Hamilton
  - London
  - Saint Catharines
  - Thunder Bay
- Vancouver
  - Kamloops
  - Nelson
  - Prince George
  - Victoria
- Winnipeg (not Metropolitan)

There is a Military Ordinariate of Canada for Canadian military personnel.

The Anglican use of the Latin Church is served from the United States, based in Houston, Texas, by the Personal Ordinariate of the Chair of Saint Peter.

One former Canadian bishopric, the francophone Diocese of Gravelbourg in Saskatchewan, has since its suppression in 1998 become a titular episcopal see, which may be bestowed on any Latin bishop without proper diocese, working in the Roman Curia or anywhere in the world.

=== Eastern dioceses ===
There is a Ukrainian Greek Catholic (Byzantine Rite) province, headed by the Metropolitan Archeparchy of Winnipeg, which has four suffragan eparchies (dioceses):

- Ukrainian Catholic Eparchy of Edmonton
- Ukrainian Catholic Eparchy of New Westminster
- Ukrainian Catholic Eparchy of Saskatoon
- Ukrainian Catholic Eparchy of Toronto and Eastern Canada in Toronto.

Coptic Catholic Churches in Canada 1) Notre dame D'Egypt in Laval- Quebec 2)Holy family Coptic Catholic church in Toronto – Ontario

There are five other eparchies and an exarchate in Canada:

- also Byzantine rite:
  - Melkite Eparchy of Saint-Sauveur de Montréal, immediately subject to the Melkite Patriarch of Antioch
  - Romanian Catholic Eparchy of St George's in Canton, a Romanian Greek Catholic Church Eparchy covering all of North America (including Canada), with cathedral see in Canton, Ohio
  - Slovak Exarchate of Saints Cyril and Methodius of Toronto, Slovak Greek Catholic Church jurisdiction under the Ruthenian Greek Catholic Church's North American province, the Byzantine Catholic Metropolitan Church of Pittsburgh
- Antiochian Rite: Maronite Eparchy of Saint-Maron de Montréal, immediately subject to the Maronite Patriarch of Antioch
- Chaldean Rite: Chaldean Catholic Eparchy of Mar Addai of Toronto, directly dependent on the Chaldean Patriarch of Baghdad
- Syrian Catholic Apostolic Exarchate for Canada (immediately exempt to the Holy See)
- Syro-Malabar Catholic Eparchy of Mississauga (immediately exempt to the Holy See)

A few Eastern particular church communities are pastorally served from the United States:

- Armenian Rite: Armenian Catholic Eparchy of Our Lady of Nareg in New York, directly subject to the Patriarch of Cilicia

== See also ==
- Canadian Conference of Catholic Bishops
- Catholic Church sexual abuse cases in Canada
- Catholic sisters and nuns in Canada
- Catholic Press Association of the United States and Canada
- List of Catholic dioceses in Canada
- List of Catholic dioceses (structured view)
- List of Canadian Catholic saints
- List of Indian residential schools in Canada
- Indian Mass
- Protestantism in Canada
- Roman Catholic Archdiocese of St. John's, Newfoundland
- Sexual abuse cases in the Congregation of Christian Brothers
- Clerico-nationalism
- Christianity in Canada
