= Diocese of Joliette =

Catholic ecclesiastical territory

Coordinates: 46.0269°N 73.4377°W

Diocese of Joliette Dioecesis Ioliettensis
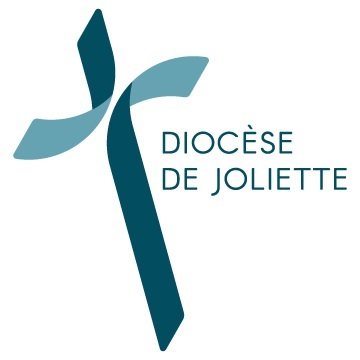
- Logo of the Diocese

Location
- Country: Canada
- Ecclesiastical province: Archdiocese of Montreal

Statistics
- Population: Total; Catholics: 285,500; 257,420 (90.2%)
- Parishes: 23

Information
- Denomination: Catholic Church
- Rite: Roman Rite
- Established: 27 January 1904
- Cathedral: St. Charles Borromeo Cathedral, Joliette
- Secular priests: 45

Current leadership
- Pope: Leo XIV
- Bishop: Louis Corriveau
- Metropolitan Archbishop: Christian Lépine
- Bishops emeritus: Gilles Lussier

Website
- diocesedejoliette.org

The Roman Catholic Diocese of Joliette (Latin: Dioecesis Ioliettensis) (erected 27 January 1904) is a suffragan in Joliette of the Archdiocese of Montréal.

== Gallery ==
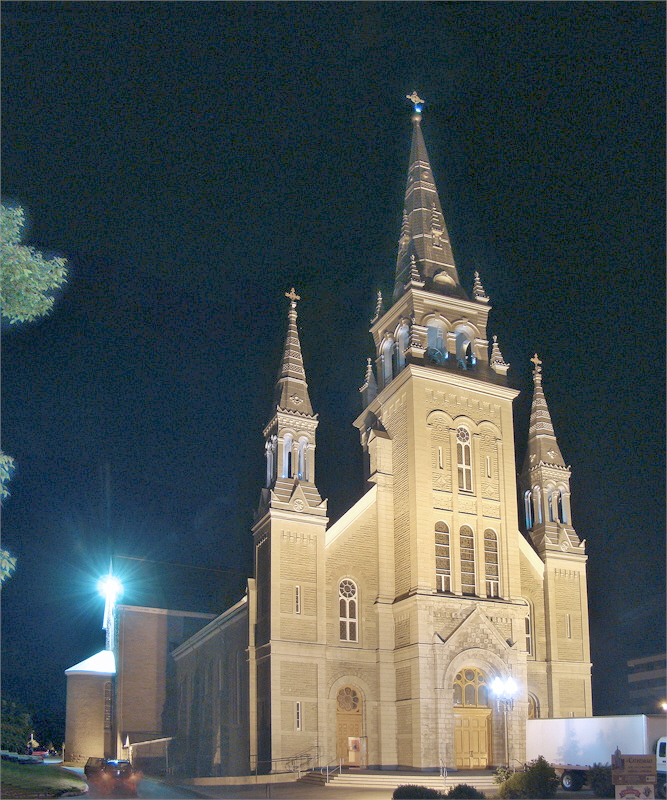
Saint-Charles-Borromée Cathedral

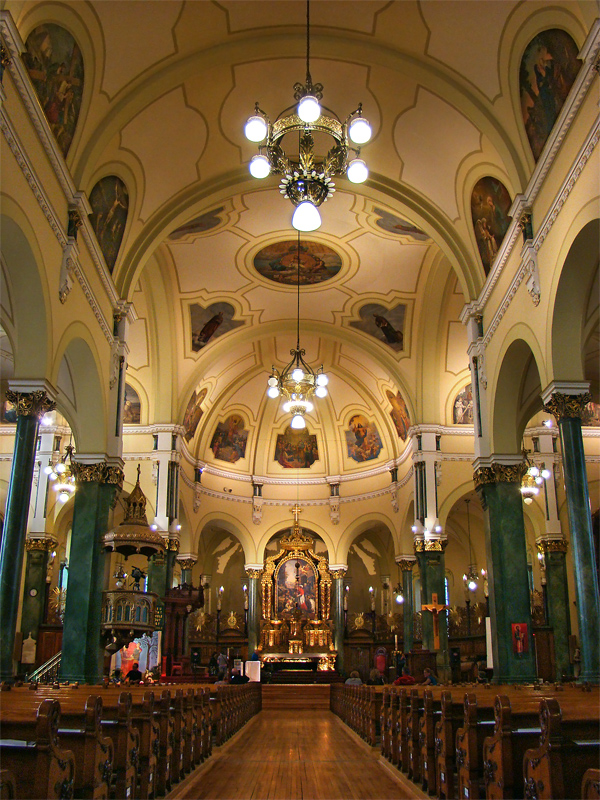
Interior of the Cathedral

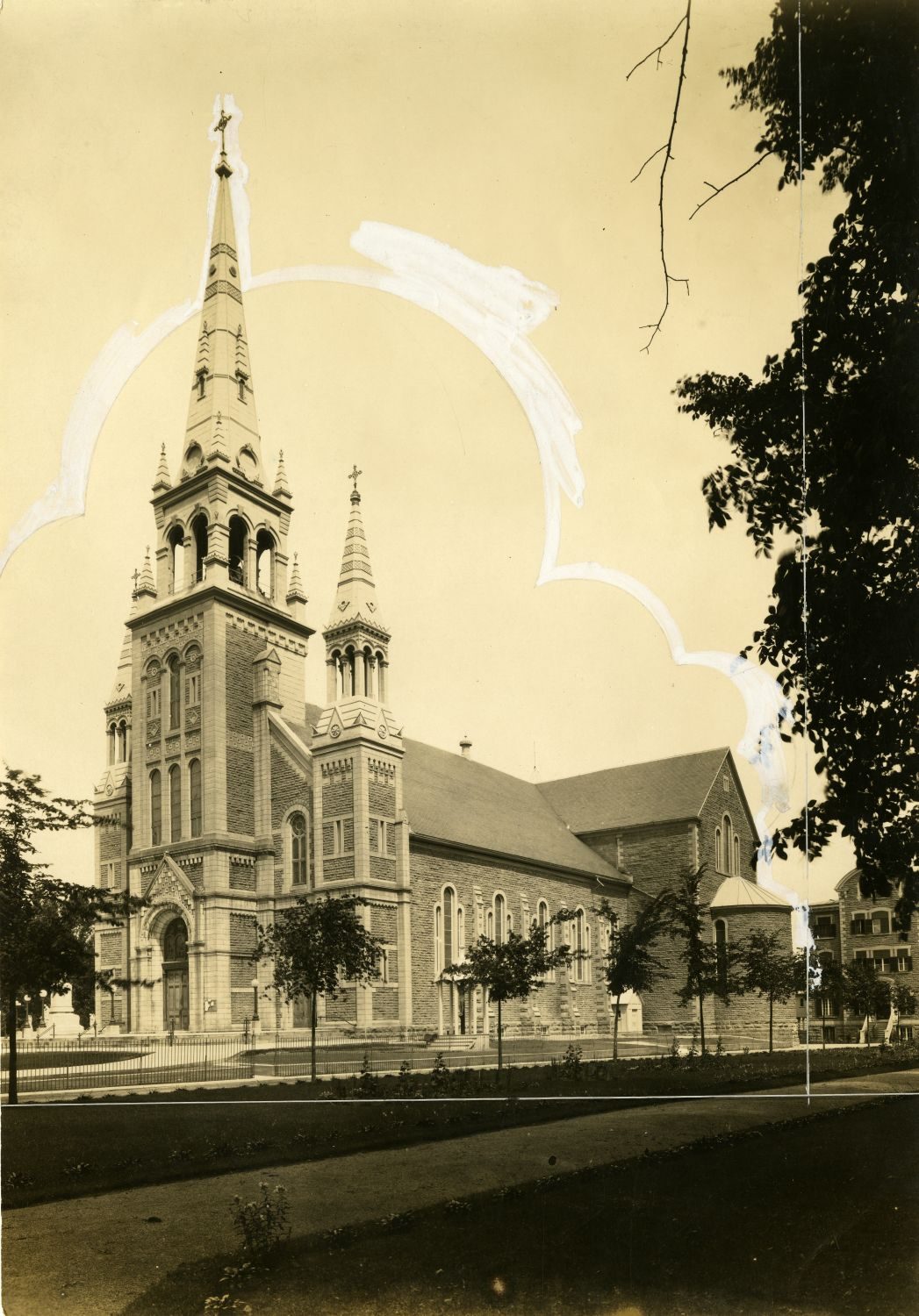
Saint-Charles-Borromée Cathedral in 1900

== Bishops ==
=== Ordinaries ===
- Joseph-Alfred Archambeault (1904–1913)
- Joseph-Guillaume-Laurent Forbes (1913–1928), appointed Archbishop of Ottawa, Ontario
- Joseph Arthur Papineau (1928–1968), retired
- René Audet (1968–1990), resigned
- Gilles Lussier (1991–2015), retired
- Raymond Poisson (2015–2018), appointed Coadjutor Bishop of Saint-Jérôme, Québec
- Louis Corriveau (2019–Present)

=== Auxiliary bishop ===
- Édouard Jetté (1948-1968)

=== Other priest of this diocese who became bishop ===
- Vital Massé, appointed Auxiliary Bishop of Saint-Jérôme, Québec in 1993

== External links and references ==
=== Bibliography ===
- Diocese of Joliette site (in French)
- "Diocese of Joliette". Catholic-Hierarchy.
