= USCCB Publishing =

US Catholic publisher

- Parent company: United States Conference of Catholic Bishops
- Defunct: 2022
- Country of origin: United States
- Headquarters location: Washington, D.C.
- Publication types: books
- Nonfiction topics: Catholicism
- Official website: www.usccbpublishing.org

USCCB Publishing is a publisher that participates in the mission of the United States Conference of Catholic Bishops as a professional publishing resource in the areas of print and electronic media and intellectual property management. It seeks to effectively use resources and technology to assist the bishops in proclaiming the Good News of Jesus and sharing the teachings of the Catholic Church.

In May 2022, the USCCB announced that its news agency, Catholic News Service, would close domestic operations at the end of the year; however the Rome Bureau and Office of Public Affairs would continue. The remaining stock of books was liquidated by Ascension Press.
