= Pedneault =

Pedneault (pronounced [pɛdno]) is a French-language surname found in Canada. Notable people with the surname include:

- Hélène Pedneault (1952–2008), Canadian writer
- Jonathan Pedneault (born 1990), Canadian politician
- Roch Pedneault (1927–2018), Canadian Roman Catholic bishop
- Yvon Pedneault (1946–2023), Canadian sports journalist and broadcaster
