= Martin Veillette =

Catholic Bishop

- Bishop of Trois-Rivières
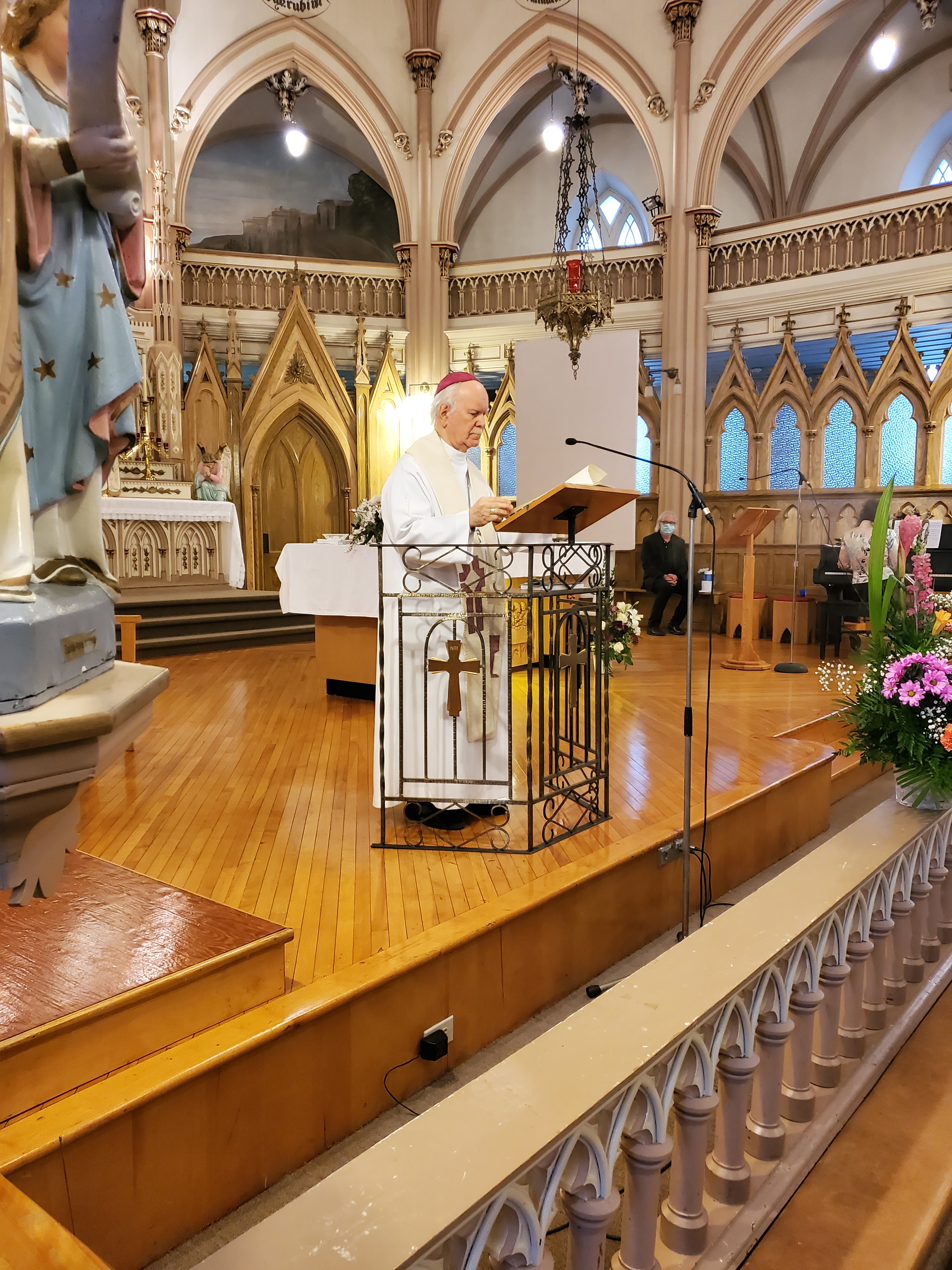
- Mgr Martin Veillette in Saint-Narcisse church (QC, Canada) in 2020
- Province: Quebec
- Diocese: Trois-Rivières
- Predecessor: Laurent Noël
- Successor: Luc-André Bouchard

Orders
- Ordination: June 12, 1960
- Consecration: December 13, 1986
- Rank: Bishop of Trois-Rivières

Personal details
- Born: Martin Veillette; November 16, 1936 (age 89) La Tuque, Quebec, Canada
- Denomination: Roman Catholic
- Parents: Sarto Veillette and Marie Létourneau
- Occupation: Bishop
- Profession: theologian, philosopher, sociologist, professor and clergyman Quebecois.
- Motto: communion craftsman (French: Artisan de communion)

Martin Veillette (born 16 November 1936 in La Tuque, in Quebec) is a Canadian bishop, theologian, philosopher, sociologist and teacher. He was Bishop of Trois-Rivières. He was the eighth bishop of the diocese of Trois-Rivières from 1996 to 2012. He resigned in 2012, according to canon 401.

== Early life and education ==
Born in a family of eleven children, he studied at Saint-Joseph seminar and at Laval University where he obtained a baccalaureate in arts.

After studying Philosophy at the Saint Paul University of Ottawa, he graduated in Social Sciences in 1973.

He teaches at Cégep de Trois-Rivières and becomes parish priest at Sainte-Thèrèse parish.

== Priesthood ==
He was ordained a priest in Trois-Rivières on June 12, 1960. Mgr Laurent Noël gives him several important positions in the diocesan hierarchical organization: he heads the Vocations Office, the Office of the Clergy and the Great Seminary of Quebec and the Diocesan Committee to the permanent diaconate.

On 1986, he is appointed titular bishop of Valabria. Mgr Louis-Albert Vachon is his main consecrator and Mgrs Laurent Noël and Jean-Guy Hamelin are his main coconsecrators.

On November 21, 1996, Pope John Paul II named him Bishop of Trois-Rivières to succeed Laurent Noël. The 1997 takes place its official care of the episcopal see.

At the Canadian Conference of Catholic Bishops, he chairs the Committee on Social Communications and deals with the introduction of a "pastoral ministry of the sea" while dealing with the various secular institutes.

At the Quebec Bishops' Assembly, he corresponds with the Association of Roman Catholic Cemeteries, chairs the legislative and administrative committees and oversees the mission file.

In May 2006, he travels to Rome and meets the Pope Benedict XVI, saying he is impressed by his visit. The pope encourages him to bring back the central place of the Eucharist in the liturgical celebration and to fight subjectivist secularism.

In 2007, he was elected head of the assembly of bishops of Quebec. He presented a testimony to the Bouchard-Taylor commission in favor of open secularism.

== Episcopal Motto ==
- "Artisan of communion"

== Related article ==
- Roman Catholic Diocese of Trois-Rivières

== Bibliography ==
- Hervé Biron. Grandeurs et misères de l'Église trifluvienne (1615-1947), Trois-Rivières, Les Éditions trifluviennes, 1947, 245 pages.(in French)
- Hardy, René (1999). Boréal (ed.). Contrôle social et mutation de la culture religieuse au Québec, 1830-1930 (Social control and change of religious culture in Quebec, 1830-1930) (in French). Montréal. p. 284. ISBN 2-890-52964-9.(in French)
- Georges Panneton et Antonio Magnan sr. Le diocèse de Trois-Rivières 1852-1952, Biographies sacerdotales, organisation diocésaine, notes historiques (Diocese of Trois-Rivières 1852-1952, Priestly Biographies, Diocesan Organization, Historical Notes), Trois-Rivières, Éditions du Bien Public, 1953, 381 pages. (Reviewed and expanded in 1962)(in French)
- Georges Panneton et Antonio Magnan sr. Le diocèse de Trois-Rivières 1962, Biographies sacerdotales, L'organisation diocésaine, Les paroisses et les curés, Les instituts religieux, Les prêtres défunts, Notes historiques - Histoire du diocèse, Les vocations sacerdotales et missionnaires (Diocese of Trois-Rivières 1962, Priestly Biographies, Diocesan Organization, Parishes and Priests, Religious Institutes, Past Priests, Historical Notes - History of the Diocese, Priestly and Missionary Vocations), Trois-Rivières, Les Éditions du Bien Public, 1962, 517 pages.(in French)
- Panneton, Jean (2002). Septentrion (ed.). Le diocèse de Trois-Rivières, 1852-2002: 150 ans d'espérance (The diocese of Trois-Rivières, 1852-2002: 150 years of hope) (in French). Sillery, Québec. p. 259. ISBN 2-894-48336-8.(in French)
- Book “History and genealogy of the Veillet/te families of America” (in French: Histoire et généalogie des familles Veillet/te d'Amérique), 1988, p. 573-574, special biography of Bishop Martin Veillette.(in French)
