= Marius Paré =

Canadian catholic priest

- Bishop of Chicoutimi
- Church: Catholic Church
- Diocese: Diocese of Chicoutimi
- In office: 18 February 1961 – 5 April 1979
- Predecessor: Georges-Arthur Melançon
- Successor: Jean-Guy Couture
- Previous posts: Coadjutor Bishop of Chicoutimi (1960-1961); Titular Bishop of Aegae (1956-1961); Auxiliary Bishop of Chicoutimi (1956-1960)

Orders
- Ordination: 3 July 1927
- Consecration: 1 May 1956 by Maurice Roy

Personal details
- Born: 22 May 1903 Montmagny, Quebec, Dominion of Canada, British Empire
- Died: 16 February 2002 (aged 98) Chicoutimi, Quebec, Canada

Marius Paré (22 May 1903 in Montmagny, Quebec – 16 February 2002) was a Canadian clergyman and bishop for the Roman Catholic Diocese of Chicoutimi. He became ordained in 1927. He was appointed bishop in 1960. He died on 16 February 2002, at the age of 98.
