= Aigai, Anatolia =

Aigai, Anatolia may refer to:

- Aigai (Aeolis), city in ancient Aeolis, member of the Aeolian dodecapolis
- Aigai (Cilicia), city in ancient Cilicia
