= Louis-Nazaire Bégin =

Catholic cardinal from Canada

His Eminence Louis-Nazaire Bégin
- Cardinal, Archbishop of Quebec
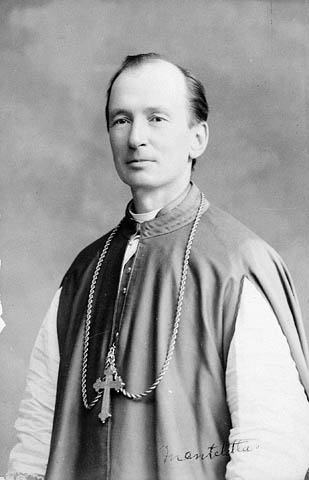
- Church: Catholic Church
- Archdiocese: Quebec
- Installed: April 12, 1898
- Term ended: July 18, 1925
- Predecessor: Elzéar-Alexandre Taschereau
- Successor: Paul-Eugène Roy
- Other post: Cardinal-Priest of Ss. Vitale, Valeria, Gervasio e Protasio
- Previous post: Coadjutor Archbishop of Quebec

Orders
- Ordination: June 10, 1865 by Costantino Patrizi Naro
- Consecration: October 28, 1888 by Elzéar-Alexandre Taschereau
- Created cardinal: May 25, 1914 by Pius X
- Rank: Cardinal-Priest

Personal details
- Born: January 10, 1840 Saint-Joseph-de-la-Pointe-Lévis (Lévis), Canada East
- Died: July 18, 1925 (aged 85) Quebec, Canada
- Coat of arms

Styles of Louis-Nazaire Bégin
- Reference style: His Eminence
- Spoken style: Your Eminence
- Religious style: Cardinal
- Informal style: Cardinal
- See: Quebec

Louis-Nazaire Bégin (January 10, 1840 – July 18, 1925) was a Canadian cardinal of the Catholic Church. Begin held a doctorate in Sacred Theology from the Pontifical Gregorian University in Rome and was later appointed Archbishop of Quebec by Pope Leo XIII (1898) and created cardinal by Pope Pius X (1914).

== Biography ==
Louis-Nazaire Bégin was born in Saint-Joseph-de-la-Pointe-Lévis (now part of Lévis), Quebec, to a family of farmers whose ancestors came from Normandy, France, to Canada in 1655. He completed his primary studies at École modèle in Lévis and later went to collège commercial in Bellechasse. From 1862 to 1863, Bégin studied classics and theology at the seminary in Quebec. He attended Université Laval and then went to Rome, where he studied at the Pontifical French Seminary (September 1863 – 1867). He was ordained to the priesthood by Costantino Cardinal Patrizi Naro on June 10, 1865, in the Lateran Basilica.

Bégin then furthered his studies at the Pontifical Gregorian University from where he obtained his doctorate in theology in 1866. He also studied the Hebrew, Chaldean, Syrian, and Arabic languages. From 1867 to 1868, he studied in the Theological Faculty of the University of Innsbruck, completing his previous studies and learning German. During that time, Bégin also traveled to Palestine and spent five months in the Holy Land.

Upon his return to Canada, he was named professor of dogmatic theology and of ecclesiastical history at the Seminary of Quebec in July 1868, remaining in those posts until 1884. He obtained the agrégation, a competitive examination for positions on the teaching staff of lyceums and universities, in 1869. From October 1870 to 1875, Bégin was Professor of Religious Culture at his alma mater of the Université Laval. He held an array of administrative posts from 1876 to 1883, such as director of the boarding school, of students, of seminarians, and prefect of studies. Bégin took several months for rest and recuperation from the end of 1883 to the beginning of 1884, and acted as the private secretary to Cardinal Elzéar-Alexandre Taschereau on his tour in Europe from April to December 1884. He served as Principal of the Normal School of Laval from January 1885 to October 1888 as well.

On October 1, 1888, Bégin was appointed Bishop of Chicoutimi by Pope Leo XIII. He received his episcopal consecration on the following October 28 from Cardinal Taschereau, with Bishops Louis-François Richer dit Laflèche and Jean-François Laforce-Langevin serving as co-consecrators, in the metropolitan cathedral-basilica of Quebec.

He was promoted to Titular Archbishop of Cyrene on December 18, 1891, and named Coadjutor Archbishop of Quebec on December 22. Illness forced Cardinal Taschereau to delegate his workload to Bégin, who was made Apostolic Administrator of Quebec on September 3, 1894. He eventually succeeded the late Cardinal as Archbishop of Quebec on April 12, 1898. Archbishop Bégin was appointed an Assistant at the Pontifical Throne on April 22, and participated in the First Plenary Council of Canada in June 1909.

Pope Pius X created him cardinal priest l of Ss. Vitale, Valeria, Gervasio e Protasio in the consistory of May 25, 1914. Bégin arrived too late to participate in the papal conclaves of both 1914 and of 1922. As archbishop, he made vehement condemnations of modernism, jazz music, dancing, and cinemas (which he described as offering "serious dangers, if not approximate occasions, of mortal sin"), the clandestine sale of liquours and the frivolous fashions of women.

Stricken by uremia followed by paralysis on June 12, 1925. He died five weeks later, on July 18, at the age of 85. His body lay in state in the chapel of his residence, guarded by a detachment of the Papal Zouaves. He was buried in the crypt of the Cathedral-Basilica of Quebec on July 25.

== See also ==
- Université Laval

Catholic Church titles
Preceded by Dominique Racine	Bishop of Chicoutimi; 1888–1892	Succeeded by Michel-Thomas Labrecque
Preceded by Elzéar-Alexandre Taschereau	Archbishop of Quebec; 1898–1925	Succeeded by Paul-Eugène Roy
