= Dominique Racine =

- Bishop of Chicoutimi
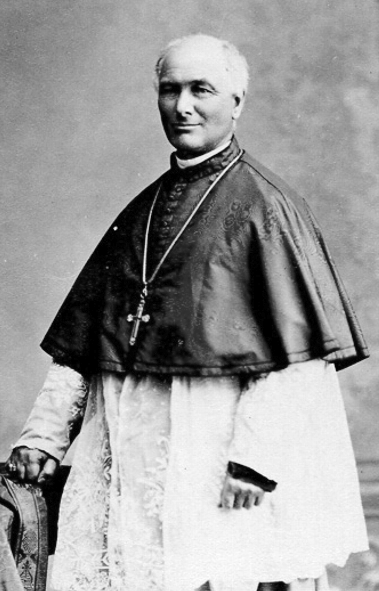
- Diocese: Chicoutimi
- Installed: 1878
- Term ended: 1888
- Predecessor: None
- Successor: Louis Nazaire Bégin

Orders
- Ordination: 1853

Personal details
- Born: January 21, 1828 Jeune-Lorette (Loretteville), Lower Canada
- Died: January 28, 1888 (aged 60) Chicoutimi, Quebec
- Denomination: Roman Catholic
- Residence: Quebec
- Parents: Michel Racine and Louise Pepin
- Spouse: N/A
- Occupation: Bishop

Dominique Racine (January 21, 1828 – January 28, 1888) was a Canadian Roman Catholic priest and Bishop of Chicoutimi from 1878 to 1888.

His brother, Antoine Racine, was the first Bishop of Sherbrooke.
