= Diocese of Rouyn-Noranda =

Catholic ecclesiastical territory

Coordinates: 48.2333°N 79.0000°W

Diocese of Rouyn-Noranda Dioecesis Ruynensis-Norandensis
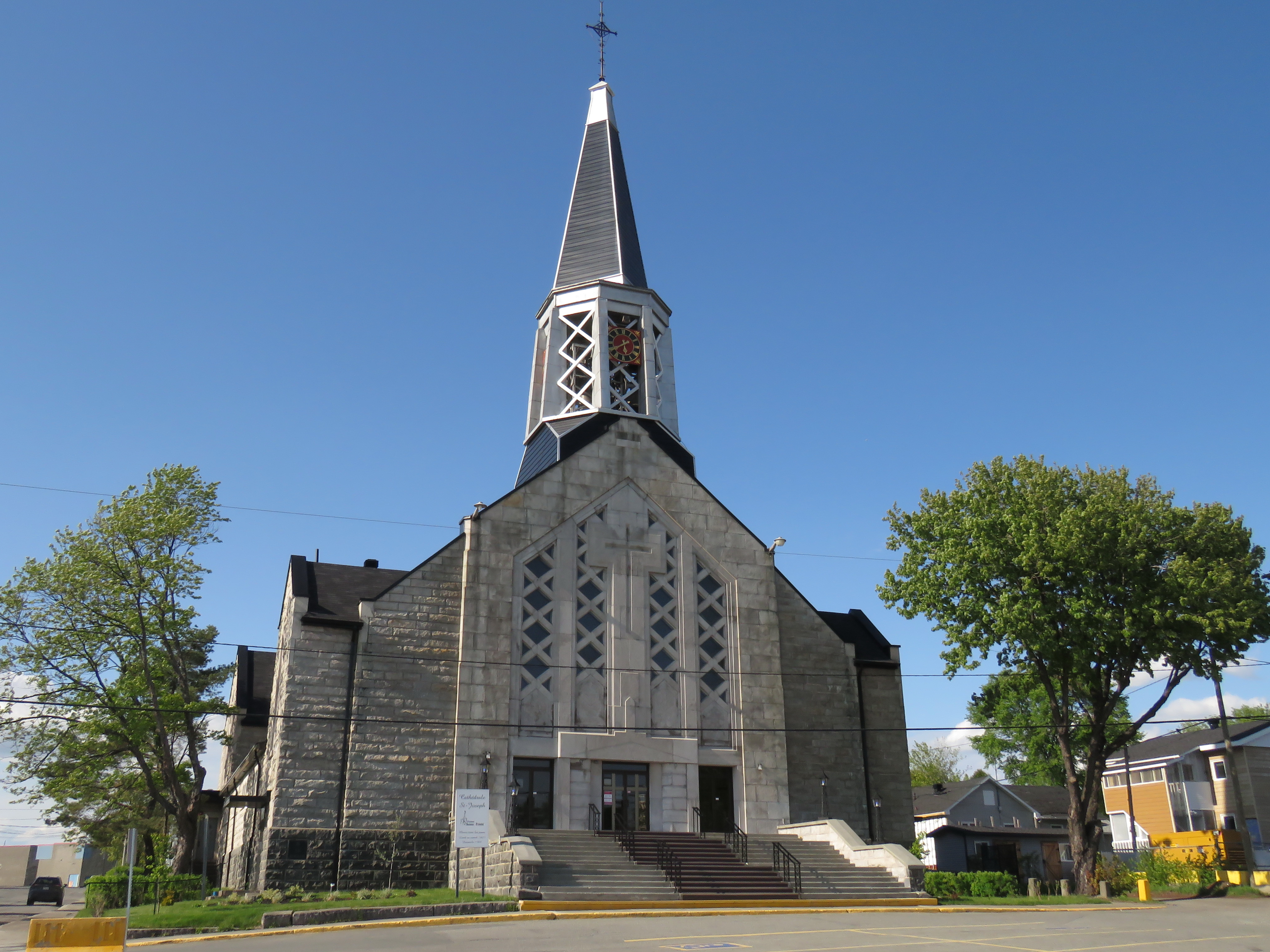
- St. Joseph Cathedral

- Logo of the diocese

Location
- Country: Canada
- Ecclesiastical province: Archdiocese of Gatineau
- Population: 58,900 (97.4%)

Information
- Denomination: Catholic
- Sui iuris church: Latin Church
- Rite: Roman Rite
- Established: 1973
- Cathedral: Cathédrale Saint-Joseph

Current leadership
- Pope: Leo XIV
- Bishop: sede vacante
- Metropolitan Archbishop: Paul-André Durocher

Map

Website
- diocese-rn.ca

The Diocese of Rouyn-Noranda (Latin: Dioecesis Ruynensis-Norandensis) is a Latin Church diocese that includes part of the Province of Quebec in the Gatineau ecclesiastical province. The Diocese was erected in November of 1973 from the territory within Quebec of Diocese of Timmins, with Jean-Guy Hamelin as the first Bishop of Rouyn-Noranda.

== Bishops ==
=== Diocesan bishops ===
The following is a list of the bishops of Rouyn-Noranda and their terms of service:

- Jean-Guy Hamelin (1973 – 2001)
- Dorylas Moreau (30 November 2001 – 25 June 2019)
- Guy Boulanger (31 January 2020 – 10 April 2026)

=== Other priest of this diocese who became bishop ===
- Pierre Goudreault, appointed Bishop of Sainte-Anne-de-la-Pocatière, Québec in 2017
