= Luc-André Bouchard =

Canadian Catholic Bishop

His Excellency Luc-André Bouchard
- Bishop of Trois-Rivières
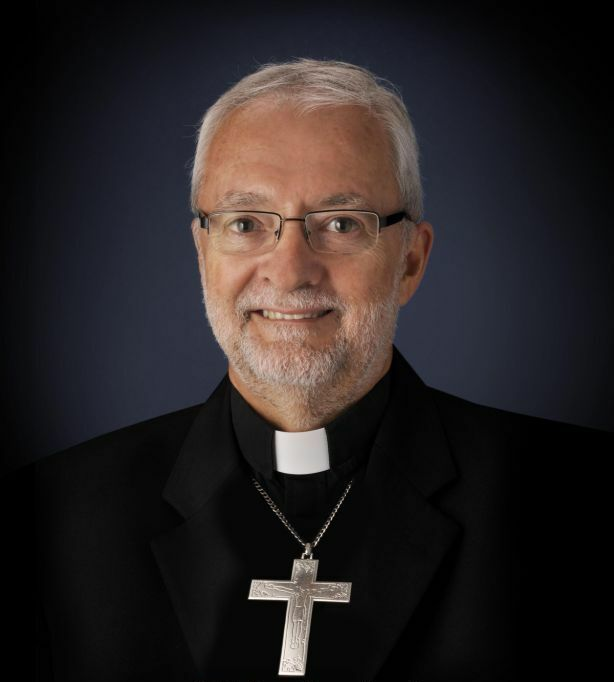
- Diocese: Trois-Rivières
- Installed: March 26, 2012
- Predecessor: Martin Veillette
- Other post: Bishop of Saint Paul in Alberta (2001-2012)

Orders
- Ordination: September 4, 1976
- Consecration: November 9, 2001
- Rank: Bishop of Trois-Rivières

Personal details
- Born: Joseph Luc André Bouchard; November 18, 1948 (age 77) Cornwall, Ontario, Canada
- Denomination: Roman Catholic
- Parents: Gaston Bouchard (Father); Lucienne Morin (Mother)
- Education: The Royal Conservatory of Music (1968); University of Ottawa (1971); Dominican University College (1974, 1977); Pontifical Biblical Institute (1983); École biblique et archéologique française de Jérusalem (1981)
- Motto: Ut Vitam Habeant; (So That They May Have Life)
- Coat of arms

Styles of Luc-André Bouchard
- Reference style: The Most Reverend (English); Monseigneur(French)
- Spoken style: Your Excellency(English); Monseigneur(French)
- Religious style: Bishop

Luc-André Bouchard (born 18 November 1949) is a Canadian bishop of the Roman Catholic Church. Appointed by Benedict XVI, Bouchard is the ninth Bishop of Trois-Rivières.

== Early life and education ==
Born in Cornwall, Ontario, Canada, of Gaston Bouchard and Lucienne Morin, Bouchard studied at The Royal Conservatory of Music of Toronto, where he received a Grade X Certificate for piano in 1968. He received a Bachelor of Arts in 1971 from the University of Ottawa. At the Dominican University College in Ottawa, he received his Bachelor of Theology in 1974 and Licentiate of Theology in 1977.

Continuing his studies, Bouchard studied Sacred Scripture at the Pontifical Biblical Institute in Rome and received his Licentiate of Sacred Scripture in 1983. He then studied in Jerusalem at the École Biblique, where he received his diploma in 1981.

== Priesthood ==
=== Parish work ===
On September 4, 1976, Bouchard was ordained a priest in the Diocese of Alexandria-Cornwall. He was appointed assistant pastor of the Co-cathédral de la Nativité de la Bienheureuse Vierge Marie between 1976 and 1979 and again between 1984 and 1986. He then became administrator of the Co-cathedral in 1986 and then rector between 1986 and 1987. He then became an assistant pastor at Sainte-Thérèse-de-Lisieux parish in 1983. Between 1987 and 1990, Bouchard became the parish priest of Saints-Martyrs-Canadiens Parish. Between 1994 and 1999, Bouchard became parish priest of the Sacré-Coeur Parish.

=== Professor ===
Bouchard taught at the Grand Séminaire de Montréal between 1985 and 1990. From 1990 to 1994 and again in 1999, Bouchard was a member of vocation formations of the seminary Saint-Joseph in Edmonton. In 1999, he became director of the seminary and rector in 2000.

== Episcopal career ==
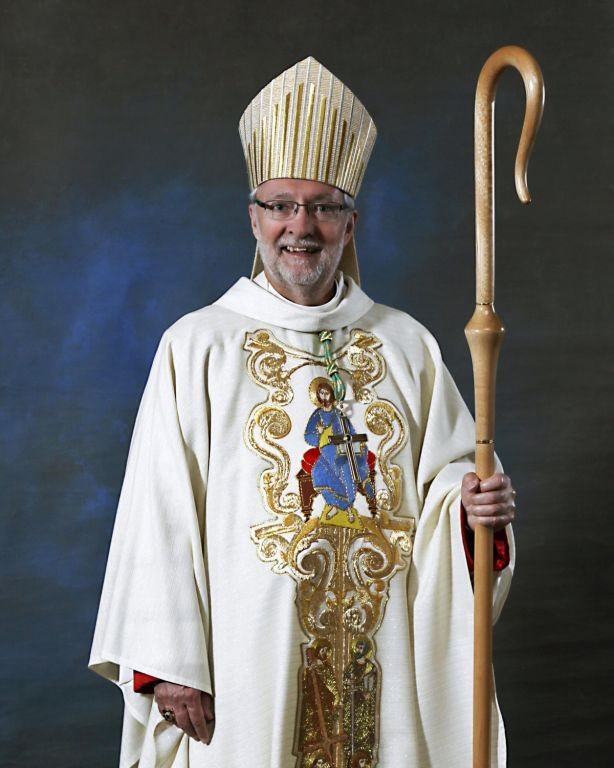
Mgr Luc Bouchard, Bishop of Trois-Rivières

On September 8, 2001, when he was still rector of Saint-Joseph Seminary in Edmonton, Bouchard was nominated to be the Bishop of Saint Paul in Alberta. He was consecrated by Archbishop Thomas Christopher Collins the then Archbishop of Edmonton on November 9, 2001. Within the Canadian Conference of Catholic Bishops Bouchard was a member of the permanent council and of many other Episcopal Commissions. He was also the President of the Episcopal Commission of Theology. In 2008, he was one of the Canadian delegates of the Synod of Bishops on the Bible held in Rome. Currently, he remains a member of the Episcopal Commission of Doctrine. On February 2, 2012, Pope Benedict XVI appointed Bouchard Bishop of Trois-Rivières to succeed Bishop Martin Veillette, who reached the age of 75 and, by Canon Law, must submit his resignation to the Pope. Bouchard's enthronement took place on March 26, 2012, at the Cathédral de l'Assomption de Marie in Trois-Rivières.
