= Maurice Roy =

20th-century Canadian Catholic cardinal

His Eminence Maurice Roy
- Cardinal; Archbishop Emeritus of Québec; Primate Emeritus of Canada
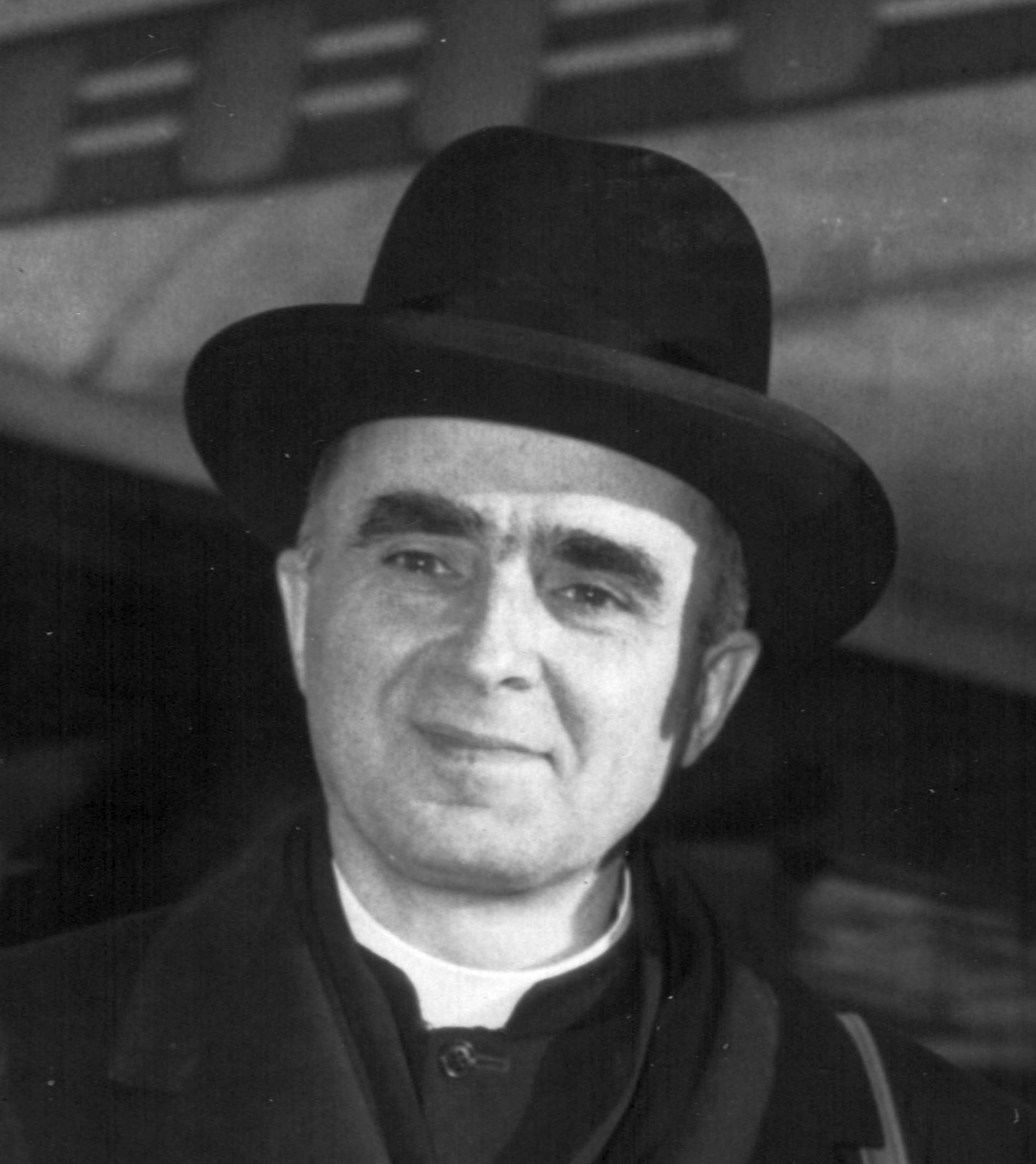
- The then-bishop seen in 1956.
- Church: Roman Catholic Church
- Archdiocese: Québec
- See: Québec
- Appointed: 2 June 1947
- Term ended: 20 March 1981
- Predecessor: Jean-Marie-Rodrigue Villeneuve
- Successor: Louis-Albert Vachon
- Other post: Cardinal-Priest of Nostra Signora del Santissimo Sacramento e Santi Martiri Canadesi (1965-85)
- Previous posts: Bishop of Trois Rivières (1946-47); Military Vicar of Canada (1946-82); President of the Pontifical Council for the Laity (1967-76); President of the Pontifical Commission of Justice and Peace (1967-76); President of the Committee for the Family (1973-76)

Orders
- Ordination: 12 June 1927 by Joseph-Simon-Herman Brunault
- Consecration: 1 May 1946 by Jean-Marie-Rodrigue Villeneuve
- Created cardinal: 22 February 1965 by Pope Paul VI
- Rank: Cardinal-Priest

Personal details
- Born: Maurice Roy; 25 January 1905 Québec City, Canada
- Died: 24 October 1985 (aged 80) Québec City, Canada
- Parents: Ferdinand Roy; Amelie Legendre
- Education: Université Laval; Pontifical University of Saint Thomas Aquinas; University of Paris; Institut Catholique de Paris
- Motto: In Nomine Jesu ("In the name of Jesus")
- Coat of arms: Maurice Roy's coat of arms

Styles of Maurice Roy
- Reference style: His Eminence
- Spoken style: Your Eminence
- Informal style: Cardinal
- See: Quebec

Maurice Roy CC OBE (January 25, 1905 – October 24, 1985) was a Canadian Catholic prelate who served as Archbishop of Quebec from 1947 to 1981. He was elevated to the cardinalate in 1965.

== Early life ==
Roy was born in Quebec City as one of three children. His father was a judge, the dean of the faculty of law at the University of Laval, and a friend of Maurice Duplessis. His mother was a descendant of the poet Napoléon Legendre. Initially homeschooled, he was ordained to the priesthood by Bishop Joseph Brunault on June 12, 1927 after attending the Seminary of Quebec from 1915 to 1923. He obtained his licentiate in theology from the Université Laval in 1927, and then studied at the Angelicum in Rome, receiving a doctorate in philosophy in 1929. From 1929 to 1930, he attended the Sorbonne and the Catholic Institute in Paris. Roy then taught dogmatic and sacramental theology and apologetics at Quebec's Grand Seminary until 1939. He worked as a chaplain to the University of Laval (1935–1937) and to the Canadian Army during World War II. He served in the United Kingdom, Italy, France, Belgium, the Netherlands, and Germany from 1939 to 1943 and attained the rank of colonel. He was awarded the Order of the British Empire for his "extremely courageous conduct" as a chaplain in the war. Resuming his teaching posts upon his return to Canada in 1945, Roy was named superior of the seminary in December of that same year.

== Bishop ==
On February 22, 1946, Roy was appointed Bishop of Trois Rivières by Pope Pius XII. Roy received his episcopal consecration on the following May 1 from Cardinal Jean-Marie-Rodrigue Villeneuve, OMI, with Bishops Albini Lafortune and Arthur Douville serving as co-consecrators, in the Cathedral-Basilica of Notre-Dame. His episcopal motto was In nomine Jesu. Roy became Bishop of the Catholic Military Vicariate of Canada on June 8 of the same year, later resigning from the post on March 12, 1982, after thirty-five years of service.

== Archbishop ==
Ordination history of Maurice Roy
History
Priestly ordination
- Ordained by: Joseph-Simon-Herman Brunault
- Date: June 12, 1927
Episcopal consecration
- Principal consecrator: Jean-Marie-Rodrigue Villeneuve
- Co-consecrators: Albini Lafortune, Arthur Douville
- Date: May 1, 1946
- Place: Cathedral-Basilica of Notre-Dame de Québec, Québec City, Canada
Episcopal succession
Bishops consecrated by Maurice Roy as principal consecrator
- Jean-Louis Jobidon: May 22, 1961
- Laurent Noël: August 29, 1963
- Charles Henri Lévesque: December 27, 1965
- Francis John Spence: June 15, 1967
- Henri Légaré: September 9, 1967
- Bertrand Blanchet: December 8, 1973
- Jean-Guy Hamelin: February 9, 1974
- Roch Pedneault: June 29, 1974
- Jean-Guy Couture: August 15, 1975
- Louis-Albert Vachon: May 14, 1977
- Jean-Paul Labrie: May 14, 1977
- Gérard Drainvile: June 12, 1978
- Raymond Saint-Gelais: July 31, 1980

A little over a year after Roy's first episcopal appointment, Pope Pius raised him to Archbishop of Quebec on June 2, 1947. He was made Primate of the Canadian Church upon Quebec's elevation to that ecclesiastical rank on January 24, 1956.

Roy condemned the supposed miracles of Saint-Sylvestre in 1949, and prohibited Fr. Georges-Henri Lévesque from sitting on Parliament in 1955, fearing that a priest with such a position would bring embarrassment to the Church. Participating in the Second Vatican Council (1962–1965), Roy was created Cardinal-Priest of Nostra Signora del Ss. Sacramento e Santi Martiri Canadesi by Pope Paul VI in the consistory of February 22, 1965. He was named the first President of the Pontifical Council for the Laity and of the Pontifical Council for Justice and Peace on January 6, 1967, and then first President of the Pontifical Council for the Family on January 11, 1973.

As President of the Pontifical Council for the Laity and of the Pontifical Council for Justice and Peace, it was to Roy, that Pope Paul VI addressed his apostolic letter of 14 May 1971, Octogesima adveniens commemorating the eightieth anniversary of Rerum novarum and discussing the role of the laity and local churches in responding to situations of injustices.

In 1971 Roy was made a Companion of the Order of Canada, and he resigned all three of his Curial posts on December 16, 1976. He was a cardinal elector in the conclaves of August and October 1978, and stepped down as Quebec's archbishop on March 20, 1981, after a period of thirty-three years.

Roy died in his sleep at a hospital in Quebec, at age 80. He is buried in the crypt of the Cathedral of Notre-Dame. Thus his baptism, confirmation, priestly ordination, episcopal consecration, installment as Archbishop of Quebec, and burial all took place at the Cathedral of Notre-Dame.

=== Honours ===
- Canada:
  - Order of Canada – (early 1970s)
- United Kingdom:
  - Officer of the Order of the British Empire - (late 1940s)

Catholic Church titles
Preceded by Alfred-Odilon Comtois	Bishop of Trois Rivières; 1946–1947	Succeeded by Georges-Léon Pelletier
Preceded by Charles Leo Nelligan	Bishop of Military Ordinariate of Canada; 1946–1982	Succeeded by Francis John Spence
Preceded by Jean-Marie-Rodrigue Villeneuve	Archbishop of Quebec; 1947–1981	Succeeded by Louis-Albert Vachon
Preceded by none	President of the Pontifical Council for the Laity; 1967–1976	Succeeded by Opilio Rossi
Preceded by none	President of the Pontifical Council for Justice and Peace; 1967–1976	Succeeded by Bernardin Gantin
Preceded by none	President of the Pontifical Council for the Family; 1973–1976	Succeeded by Édouard Gagnon
