= Diocese of Trois-Rivières =

Catholic ecclesiastical territory

Coordinates: 46.3500°N 72.5500°W

Diocese of Trois-Rivières Dioecesis Trifluvianensis in Canada
- The Coat of Arms of the Roman Catholic Diocese of Trois-Rivières

Location
- Country: Canada
- Ecclesiastical province: Quebec

Statistics
- Population: Total; Catholics: (as of 2023); 254,000; 250,000 (98.4%)
- Parishes: 62

Information
- Denomination: Roman Catholic
- Rite: Roman Rite
- Established: 8 June 1852
- Cathedral: Cathédral de l'Assomption de Marie
- Patron saint: The Virgin Mary of the Assumption

Current leadership
- Pope: Leo XIV
- Bishop: Pierre Goudreault
- Metropolitan Archbishop: Gérald Lacroix
- Bishops emeritus: Luc-André Bouchard; Martin Veillette

Map

Website
- diocese-tr.qc.ca

The Roman Catholic Diocese of Trois-Rivières (Latin: Dioecesis Trifluvianensis in Canada) (erected 8 June 1852) is a suffragan of the Archdiocese of Québec.

== History ==
The Diocese of Trois-Rivières was erected from the Archdiocese of Quebec on June 8, 1852. Rev. Thomas Cooke was appointed the first bishop. At that time, the diocese extended to the Eastern Townships, and included thirty-nine parishes.

The Collège des Trois-Rivières was founded in 1860; in 1874, it became the diocesan seminary. Also in 1874, the Diocese of Sherbrooke was created from Trois-Rivières. Notre-Dame-du-Cap was designated a national pilgrimage site by the bishops of Canada in 1909.

== Bishops ==
=== Ordinaries ===
- Thomas Cooke (1852 – 1870)
- Louis-François Richer dit Laflèche (1870 – 1898)
- François-Xavier Cloutier (1899 – 1934)
- Alfred-Odilon Comtois (1934 – 1945)
- Maurice Roy (1946 – 1947), appointed Archbishop of Québec
- Georges-Léon Pelletier (1947 – 1975)
- Laurent Noël (1975 – 1996)
- Martin Veillette (1996 – 2012)
- Luc-André Bouchard (2012 – 2021)
- Martin Laliberté, P.M.E. (2022 – 2026), appointed coadjutor bishop of the Diocese of Saint-Jean–Longueuil
- Pierre Goudreault (2026 – present)

=== Coadjutor bishop ===
- Louis-François Richer dit Laflèche (1866-1870)

=== Auxiliary bishops ===
- Pierre Olivier Tremblay, O.M.I. (2018- )

=== Other priests of this diocese who became bishop ===
- Jean-Guy Hamelin, appointed Bishop of Rouyn-Noranda, Québec

== Territorial losses ==
Year	Along with	To form
1874	Archdiocese of Québec; Diocese of Saint-Hyacinthe	Diocese of Sherbrooke
1882	Diocese of Ottawa; Archdiocese of Saint-Boniface	Vicariate Apostolic of Pontiac
1885		Diocese of Nicolet

== Bibliography ==
- "Diocese of Trois Rivières". Catholic-Hierarchy.
