= Saint-François-Xavier Cathedral =

Coordinates: 48.4280°N 71.0531°W

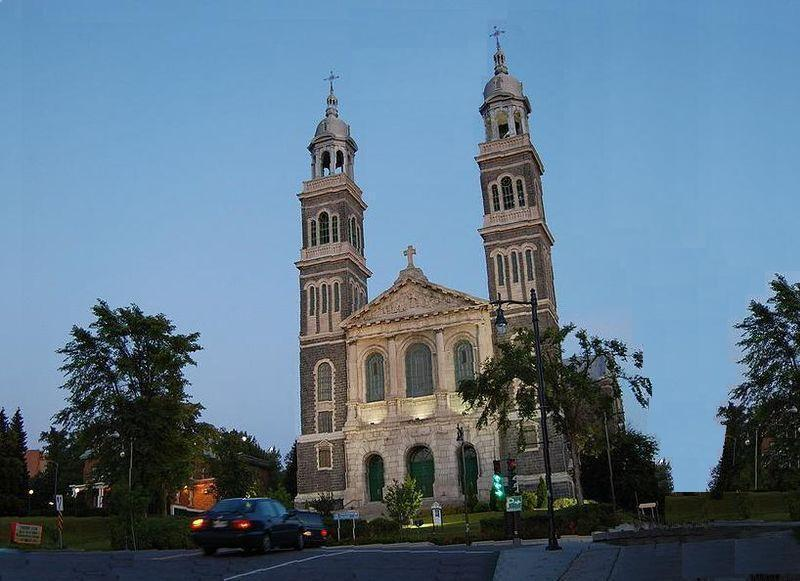
- Saint-François-Xavier Cathedral
- Saint-François-Xavier Cathedral
- Location: 514, rue Racine Est; Saguenay, Quebec, Canada; G7H 1T9
- Denomination: Roman Catholic

History
- Status: Cathedral
- Dedication: 1922

Architecture
- Functional status: Active
- Architect(s): Rene-P. Lemay, Armand Gravel and Alfred Lamontagne
- Architectural type: Norman-Gothic
- Style: Renaissance revival

Administration
- Diocese: Roman Catholic Diocese of Chicoutimi

The Cathedral of St. Francis Xavier (French: Cathédrale Saint-François-Xavier) is the cathedral church of the Roman Catholic Diocese of Chicoutimi, Quebec, Canada. It is located at 514, rue Racine Est in the Saguenay borough of Chicoutimi, overlooking the old port area of the town.

The current structure is the fourth church to occupy this site and the third to serve as cathedral for the diocese. It has seating capacity for 1,500 worshippers.

The first cathedral opened in 1878 and was destroyed by fire June 24, 1912. Its replacement opened in 1915, but also succumbed to fire on January 16, 1919. The current sanctuary opened in 1922 and was designed by architects Rene-P. Lemay, Armand Gravel and Alfred Lamontagne in the Renaissance revival style.
