= Assumption Cathedral (Trois-Rivières) =

Assumption of Mary Cathedral
- Cathédrale de l'Assomption de Trois-Rivières
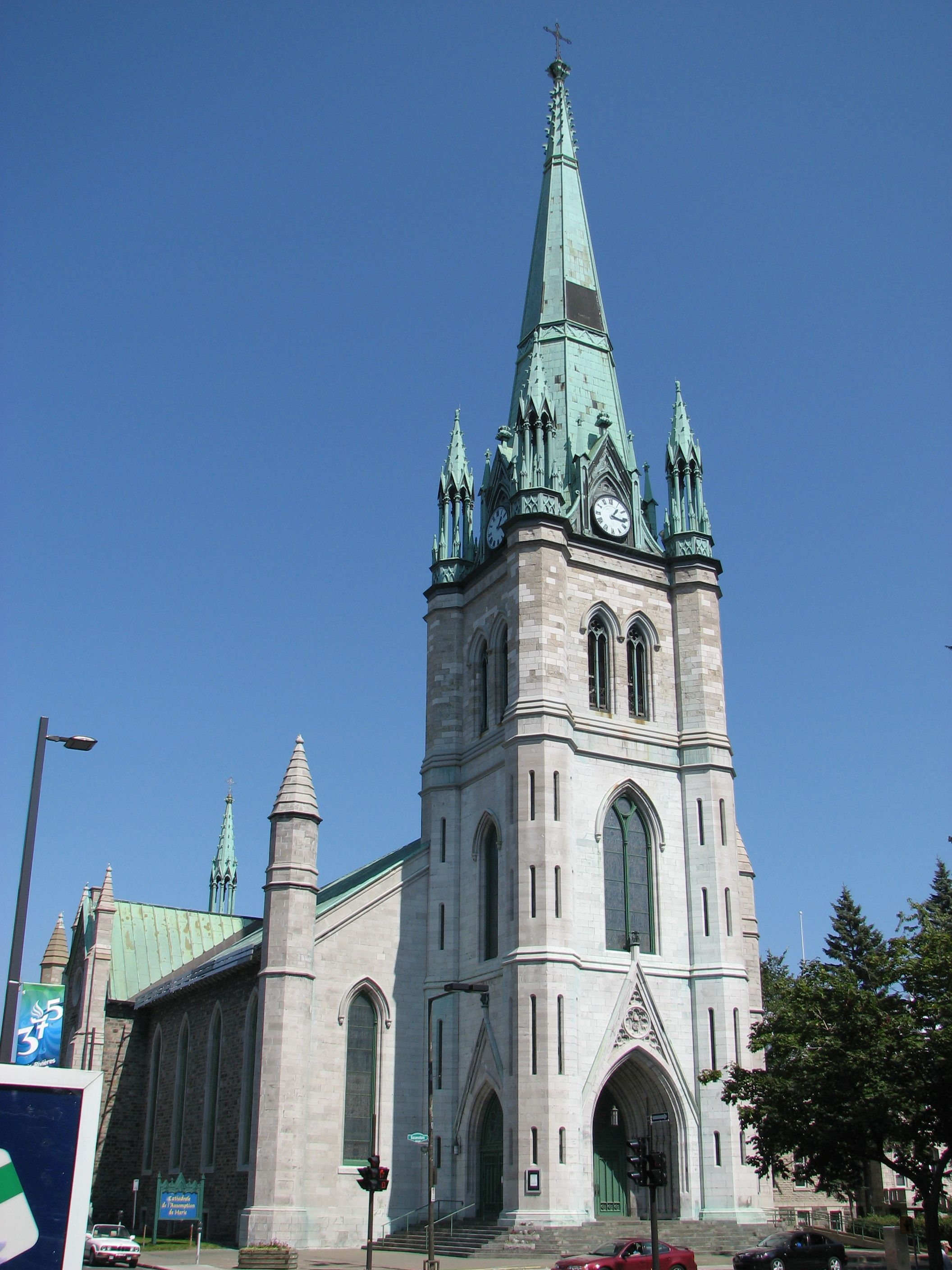

- Location of Assumption Cathedral in Québec
- 46°20′40″N 72°32′34″W
- Location: Trois-Rivières, Quebec
- Country: Canada
- Denomination: Roman Catholic Church

The Assumption Cathedral (French: Cathédrale de l'Assomption de Trois-Rivières) also called Paroisse Immaculée-Conception of Trois-Rivières, is the mother church of the Roman Catholic Diocese of Trois-Rivieres in Quebec, Canada, since the nineteenth century.

The parish of the Immaculate Conception of the Blessed Virgin (paroisse of L'Immaculée-Conception-de-la-Sainte-Vierge) also includes, besides the cathedral, churches (or local communities) of Our Lady of the Seven Joys, St. Philip, St. Francis and St Cecilia.

The first Mass was celebrated in the local soil on July 26, 1615, held by the Recollect Father Denys Jamet. The Immaculate Conception (fr: Immaculée-Conception) of Trois-Rivières was later erected as a parish on October 30, 1678, and the construction of the first church of twenty meters long and eight meters wide is then undertaken by François Boivin, master carpenter.

On June 8, 1852, Trois-Rivières is canonically erected by Pope Pius IX and Bishop Thomas Cooke became its first bishop. The new bishop sent orders dated March 16, 1854 which launched a construction project for the cathedral. It was inaugurated on September 29, 1858.

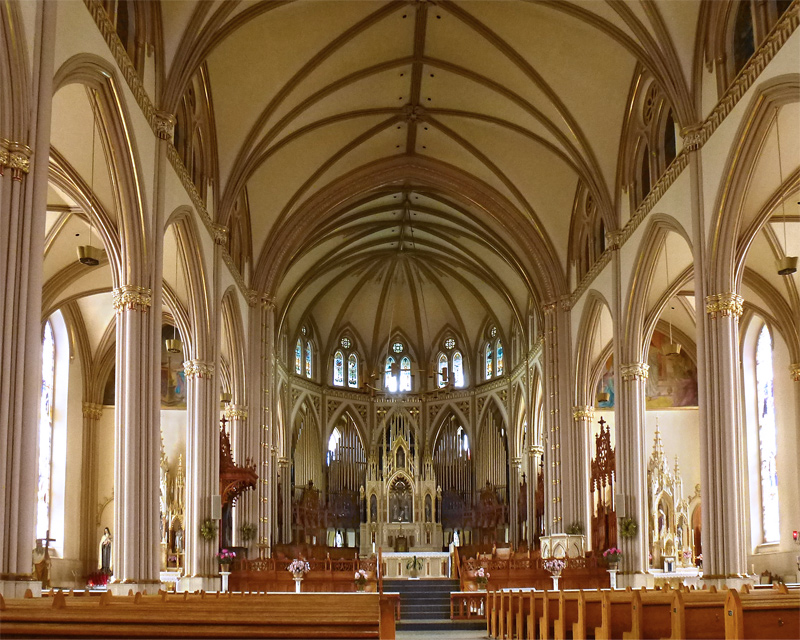
Internal view

== See also ==
- Roman Catholicism in Canada
