= Laurent Noël =

Roman Catholic prelate (1920–2022)

His Excellency Laurent Noël
- Bishop Emeritus of Trois-Rivières
- Church: Roman Catholic Church
- Province: Archdiocese of Quebec
- Diocese: Diocese of Trois-Rivières
- Appointed: November 8, 1975
- Installed: December 13, 1975
- Term ended: November 21, 1996
- Predecessor: Georges-Léon Pelletier
- Successor: Martin Veillette
- Previous posts: Titular Bishop of Agathopolis (1963–1975); Auxiliary Bishop of Quebec (1963–1974); Apostolic Administrator of Hauterive (1974–1975)

Orders
- Ordination: June 16, 1944
- Consecration: August 29, 1963 by Maurice Roy

Personal details
- Born: March 19, 1920 Saint-Just-de-Bretenières, Quebec, Canada
- Died: July 2, 2022 (aged 102) Quebec City, Canada
- Denomination: Roman Catholic
- Motto: In Caritate Dei English: In the Charity of God
- Coat of arms

Laurent Noël (March 19, 1920 – July 2, 2022) was a Canadian prelate of the Roman Catholic Church. He served as bishop of Diocese of Trois-Rivières from 1975 to 1996.

== Life ==
Noël was born in Saint-Just-de-Bretenières, Quebec and was ordained a priest on June 16, 1944 for the Diocese of Sainte-Anne-de-la-Pocatière. He was appointed Auxiliary Bishop of the Archdiocese of Quebec on June 25, 1963 as well as titular bishop of Agathopolis, and was consecrated on August 29, 1963. He was the Apostolic Administrator Diocese of Hauterive from 1974 to 1975. Noël was appointed to the Diocese of Trois-Rivières on November 8, 1975, where he served until his retirement on November 21, 1996. Upon the death of Damián Iguacén Borau on November 24, 2020, he became the oldest living Catholic bishop. Upon the death of Remi De Roo on February 1, 2022, he became the last surviving Canadian bishop to participate in the Second Vatican Council.

Catholic Church titles
Preceded by Georges-Léon Pelletier	Bishop of Trois-Rivières; 1975–1996	Succeeded by Martin Veillette
Preceded by Gérard Couturier	Apostolic Administrator of Hauterive; 1974–1975	Succeeded by Jean-Guy Couture
Preceded by Frane Franić	Titular Bishop of Agathopolis; 1981–1983	Succeeded by Robert Mikhail Moskal
Preceded by —	Auxiliary Bishop of Québec; 1963–1974	Succeeded by —
