= Michel-Thomas Labrecque =

Canadian Roman Catholic bishop (1849–1932)

- Bishop of Chicoutimi, Quebec
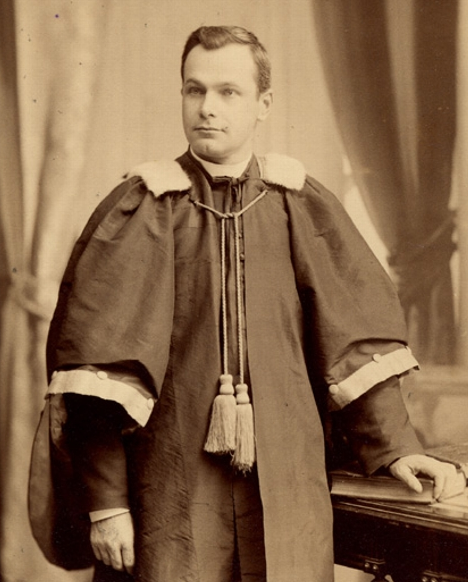
- Diocese: Chicoutimi
- Installed: 1892
- Term ended: 1927
- Predecessor: Louis Nazaire Bégin
- Successor: Charles-Antonelli Lamarche

Personal details
- Born: 30 December 1849 Saint-Anselme
- Died: 3 June 1932 (aged 82)

Michel-Thomas Labrecque (30 December 1849 – 3 Jun 1932) was a Canadian Roman Catholic bishop. He was Bishop of Chicoutimi, Quebec from 1892 to 1927.
