= Dorylas Moreau =

Canadian bishop (1947–2019)

- Bishop Emeritus of Rouyn-Noranda, Quebec
- Diocese: Rouyn-Noranda
- Installed: 2001
- Term ended: 25 June 2019
- Predecessor: Jean-Guy Hamelin

Orders
- Ordination: 20 May 1972

Personal details
- Born: 15 July 1947 Kamouraska, Quebec, Canada
- Died: 22 October 2019 (aged 72)
- Denomination: Catholic
- Occupation: clergy
- Profession: priest, bishop

Dorylas Moreau (15 July 1947 – 22 October 2019) was a Canadian bishop of the Catholic Church and the second Bishop of Rouyn-Noranda, who led that diocese from 2001 to his retirement in June of 2019 due to poor health.

== Biography ==
Moreau was born on 15 July 1947 in Kamouraska, Quebec. He studied at the Collège de Sainte-Anne-de-la-Pocatière, the Campus Saint-Augustin in Cap-Rouge, Quebec City, and the Major Seminary in Quebec. He was ordained a priest for the diocese of Sainte-Anne-de-la-Pocatière on 20 May 1972. He then spent two years as Vice Chancellor and Secretary of the Episcopal Curia. He then completed further liturgical studies in Bruges and Montreal. Returning to the diocese, he was appointed head of the sacramental and liturgical pastoral service and a diocesan liaison with the Charismatic Renewal. Simultaneously with these offices he was the parish priest. From 2000 to 2001 he was a parish priest at Saint Patrick in Rivière-du-Loup.

Moreau was named bishop of the Roman Catholic Diocese of Rouyn-Noranda, Canada on 30 November 2001.

In 2017, citing the shortage of priests in his diocese, Moreau successfully petitioned the Congregation for Divine Worship and the Discipline of the Sacraments to allow a woman, Sister Pierrette Thiffault of Témiscamingue, a member of the Sisters of Providence, to officiate at a wedding.

Within the Canadian Bishops Conference, Moreau served on and then led its Commission on Liturgy and Sacraments (French Sector) and was a member of the Commission for Doctrine. He was also a member of the Episcopal Liturgy Association for French-speaking Countries (AELF) and the French-speaking Episcopal Commission for Liturgical Translations (CEFTL).

Pope Francis accepted his resignation as bishop for health reasons on 25 June 2019, a month before he turned 72. He was reported to be in poor health months earlier.
