= François-Xavier Cloutier =

Canadian Roman Catholic bishop (1848–1934)

- Bishop of Trois Rivières
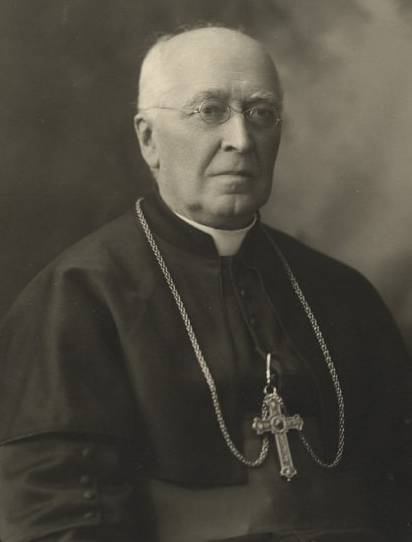
- Diocese: Trois-Rivières
- Installed: 1899
- Term ended: 1934
- Predecessor: Louis-François Richer Laflèche
- Successor: Alfred-Odilon Comtois

Orders
- Ordination: 22 September 1872

Personal details
- Born: 2 November 1848 Sainte-Geneviève de Batiscan
- Died: 18 September 1934 (aged 85)

François-Xavier Cloutier (2 November 1848 – 18 September 1934) was a Canadian Roman Catholic Bishop. He was Bishop of Trois Rivières from 1889 to his death in 1934.
