= Diocese of Chicoutimi =

Catholic ecclesiastical territory

Coordinates: 48.4279°N 71.0530°W

Diocese of Chicoutimi Dioecesis Chicoutimiensis
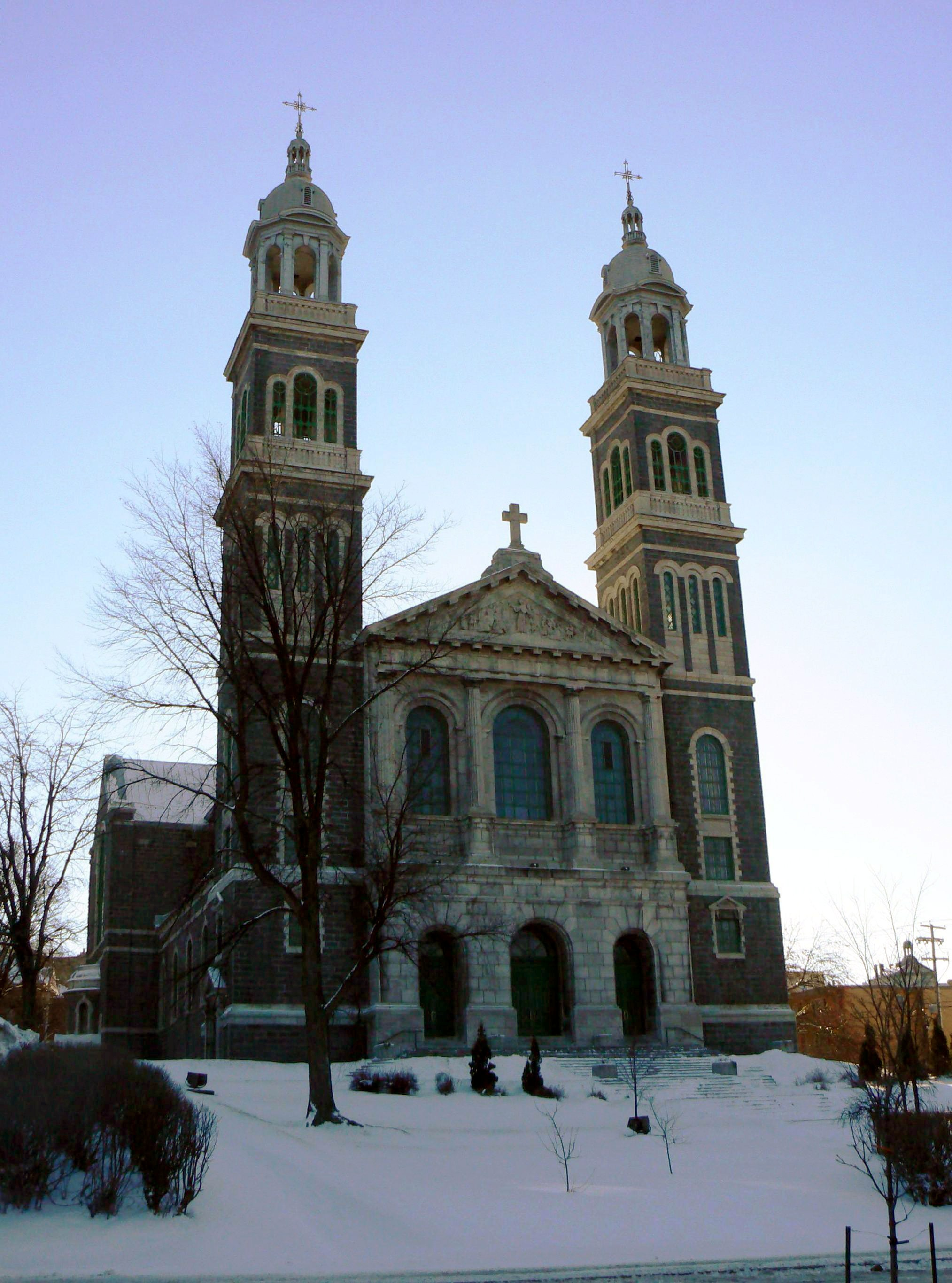

Location
- Country: Canada
- Ecclesiastical province: Québec

Statistics
- Population: Total; Catholics: (as of 2016); 282,000 (est.); 275,000 (est.) (97.5%)
- Parishes: 65

Information
- Denomination: Roman Catholic
- Rite: Roman Rite
- Cathedral: Saint-François-Xavier Cathedral
- Secular priests: 112 (diocesan); 21 (Religious Orders); 43 Permanent Deacons

Current leadership
- Pope: Leo XIV
- Bishop: René Guay
- Metropolitan Archbishop: Gérald Lacroix
- Bishops emeritus: André Rivest

Website
- evechedechicoutimi.qc.ca

The Diocese of Chicoutimi (Latin: Dioecesis Chicoutimiensis) is a Roman Catholic diocese in Quebec, centred on the borough of Chicoutimi in the city of Saguenay. It is part of the ecclesiastical province of Quebec.

On 18 November 2017, Pope Francis appointed René Guay, a priest of Chicoutimi, as the new bishop.

== Bishops ==
- Dominique Racine (1878-1888)
- Louis Nazaire Bégin (1888-1892), appointed Coadjutor Archbishop of Québec; future Cardinal
- Michel-Thomas Labrecque (1892-1927)
- Charles-Antonelli Lamarche (1928-1940)
- Georges-Arthur Melançon (1940-1961)
- Marius Paré (1961-1979)
- Jean-Guy Couture (1979-2004)
- André Rivest (2004-2017)
- René Guay (2017–present)

=== Coadjutor bishop ===
- Marius Paré (1960-1961)

=== Auxiliary bishops ===
- Marius Paré (1956-1960), appointed Coadjutor here
- Roch Pedneault (1974-2002)

=== Other priests of this diocese who became bishops ===
- Bertrand Blanchet, appointed Bishop of Gaspé, Québec in 1973
- Serge Patrick Poitras, appointed Bishop of Timmins, Ontario in 2012
