= Alfred-Odilon Comtois =

- Bishop of Trois-Rivières
- Diocese: Trois-Rivières, Quebec
- Predecessor: François-Xavier Cloutier
- Successor: Maurice Roy

Orders
- Ordination: September 25, 1898
- Consecration: July 28, 1926
- Rank: Bishop of Trois-Rivières

Personal details
- Born: Alfred-Odilon Comtois; March 5, 1876 Trois-Rivières, Quebec, Canada
- Died: 26 August 1945 (aged 69) Trois-Rivières, Quebec, Canada
- Denomination: Roman Catholic
- Motto: Angulari lapide Christo Jesu

Alfred-Odilon Comtois (5 March 1876 – 26 August 1945) was a Canadian bishop who was Bishop of Trois-Rivières from 1934 to 1945. From Trois-Rivières, he was ordained in 1898. He was named bishop by Pius XI and he was consecrated by François-Xavier Cloutier. In 1945, Maurice Roy succeeded him as Bishop of Trois-Rivières, the year of his death.
