= Georges-Léon Pelletier =

Canadian Catholic Bishop (1904–1987)

- Bishop of Trois-Rivières
- Diocese: Trois-Rivières
- Predecessor: Maurice Roy
- Successor: Laurent Noël

Orders
- Ordination: June 24, 1931
- Consecration: September 24, 1943
- Rank: Bishop of Trois-Rivières

Personal details
- Born: Georges-Léon Pelletier; 19 August 1904 Saint-Épiphane, Quebec, Canada
- Died: 24 September 1987 (aged 83) Trois-Rivières, Quebec, Canada
- Denomination: Roman Catholic
- Coat of arms

Georges-Léon Pelletier (19 August 1904 – 24 September 1987) was a Canadian bishop of the Roman Catholic Church. He was Bishop of Trois-Rivières from 1947 to 1975. From Saint-Épiphane, Quebec, he was ordained in 1931. He was named bishop by Pius XII and consecrated auxiliary bishop of Jean-Marie-Rodrigue Villeneuve in Quebec City. He succeeded Maurice Roy as Bishop of Trois-Rivières. In 1975, he resigned and Laurent Noël succeeded him. He died in 1987.
