= Jean-Guy Couture =

Canadian Roman Catholic prelate (1929–2022)

Monsignor Jean-Guy Couture
- Bishop of Chicoutimi
- Archdiocese: Quebec
- Installed: 5 April 1979
- Term ended: 19 June 2004
- Predecessor: Marius Paré
- Successor: André Rivest

Orders
- Ordination: 30 May 1953
- Consecration: 15 August 1975 by Maurice Roy

Personal details
- Born: 5 May 1929; Quebec City, Quebec, Canada
- Died: 2 January 2022 (aged 92)

Jean-Guy Couture (6 May 1929 – 2 January 2022) was a Canadian Roman Catholic prelate. He was a diocesan bishop of Chicoutimi, having served from 1979 to 2004.

== Biography ==
Native to the Paroisse Saint-Jean-Baptiste de Québec, Couture was ordained on 30 May 1953 following his studies at the Petit Séminaire de Québec. He became Bishop of Hauterive, having been consecrated on 15 May 1975 by Maurice Roy. In 1979, Pope John Paul II named him Bishop of Chicoutimi. He retired in 2004, having reached the age of 75. His motto was "Charity, Joy, Peace".

Couture died on 2 January 2022, at the age of 92.
