= Louis-François Richer Laflèche =

- Bishop of Trois Rivières
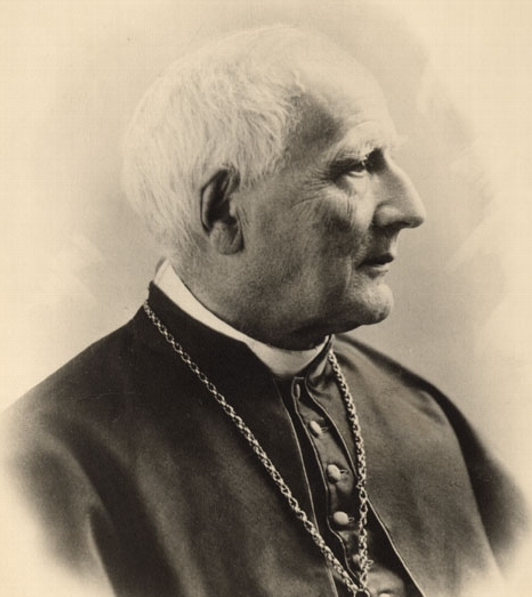
- Photograph of Lafleche
- Diocese: Trois-Rivières
- Installed: April 30, 1870
- Term ended: July 14, 1898
- Predecessor: Thomas Cooke
- Successor: François-Xavier Cloutier
- Other post: Coadjutor Bishop of Trois Rivières

Orders
- Ordination: January 7, 1844

Personal details
- Born: September 4, 1818 Sainte-Anne-de-la-Pérade, Lower Canada
- Died: July 14, 1898 (aged 79) Trois-Rivières, Quebec

Louis-François Laflèche (September 4, 1818 – July 14, 1898) was a Catholic bishop of the diocese of Trois-Rivières, in the province of Quebec, Canada.

== Early life and career ==
Laflèche was born on September 4, 1818, in the village of Sainte-Anne-de-la-Pérade to Louis-Modeste Richer dit Laflèche and Marie-Anne Richer dit Laflèche (née Joubin dit Boisvert). His family held the secondary surname of Laflèche because their ancestor, Jean Richer, was from an area in France called La Flèche, near Anjou. His grandmother from his mother's side was a Métis.

Laflèche studied at the Nicolet Seminary College in Nicolet, Lower Canada, from 1831 to 1839. Following his education, he taught classics and science while continuing courses in theology. He was ordained a priest on January 7, 1844.

In 1844, he headed a mission near the Red River of the North. As a missionary Oblate Laflèche educated himself in three Native American languages spoken in the North-Western Territory: Cree, Chipewyan, and Anishinaabe. He was the first to reduce the Chipewyan language to grammatical form.

In 1845, Chief Factor Roderick McKenzie wrote to Bishop Joseph-Norbert Provencher, of the Diocese of the North West, to request the establishment of a mission at Île-à-la-Crosse. In 1846, Oblate priest Alexandre-Antonin Taché and Laflèche founded the mission of Saint-Jean-Baptiste at Île-à-la-Crosse. The mission served as a base for Taché's extensive missionary travels to Green Lake, Reindeer Lake, Portage La Loche, and Fort Chipewyan. In 1849, Provencher recalled to Laflèche to Saint Boniface, intending to make him his coadjutor. Laflèche declined the position, arguing ill-health. Provencher then chose Taché. While the now auxiliary Bishop Taché continued his missionary work, Laflèche served as vicar general of the diocese and administrator during Bishop Provencher's absences.

In 1851 he accompanied the Métis buffalo hunters of the parish of St. François Xavier located 25 km west of St. Boniface. The hunting party was made up of 67 Métis men, a number of women who came to prepare the meat, some small children and 200 carts. In North Dakota they encountered a band of Sioux. Lafleche, dressed in his black cassock, white surplice, and stole, directed with the camp commander, Jean Baptiste Falcon, a defence against about 2,000 Sioux combatants, at the Battle of Grand Coteau (North Dakota). After a siege of two days (July 13 and 14), the Sioux withdrew, convinced that the Great Spirit protected the Métis.

When he returned to Canada in 1856, he taught mathematics, astronomy, and philosophy at the Nicolet Seminary College. He was appointed president of the college in 1859.

== Diocese of Trois-Rivières ==
In 1866, Bishop Thomas Cook of Trois-Rivières selected Laflèche to be his coadjutor. The following year, he was elevated to be head of the diocese of Anthedon. In 1869, he blessed the new church of Sainte-Anne-de-la-Pérade. While attending First Vatican Council in 1870, he was appointed Bishop of Trois-Rivières. He used his power and influence to interfere in the affairs of the Province of New Brunswick in an attempt to quash the passage of the Common Schools Act of 1871 that resulted in the separation of church and state in the New Brunswick education system.

Laflèche authored five volumes of pastoral letters and two works concerning religion in the family and a discussion of the encyclical Humanum genus. In 1885, Leo XIII split his diocese, and he was forced to comply with this action and step down from his post. Following this, he became involved in the Manitoba Schools Question from 1890 to 1896, asking the help of Joseph-Adolphe Chapleau and Wilfrid Laurier. His concern was voiced in the encyclical Affari Vos of 1897.

== Influence on politics ==
As bishop of Trois-Rivières, Laflèche gave weekly sermons at the cathedral, often touching upon subjects dealing with political and religious questions of his day. In 1876, he led the ultramontanist movement in Quebec, with the help of Bishop Ignace Bourget. He therefore had many disagreements with Bishop Elzéar-Alexandre Taschereau, who was a liberal.

Laflèche used his religious authority to help the Conservative Party of Quebec. He is associated with the phrase "L'enfer est rouge et le ciel est bleu" ("Hell is red and heaven is blue"). Blue is the color of the Conservatives and red, that of the Liberals. Laflèche's influence was especially strong in the 1890 provincial election. All the Conservative candidates were elected in the Mauricie area even though most of them were overwhelmingly defeated across the province.

== Death ==
He died on July 12, 1898, at 79 years of age. He had been a priest for 54 years and a bishop for 31 years.

== Honor ==
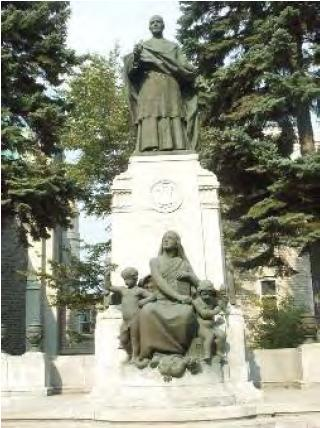
Statue of Laflèche in Trois-Rivières by the sculptor Elzéar Soucy in 1926

The following sites and landmarks were named to honor Laflèche:

- In the Mauricie, Quebec area:
  - Avenue Laflèche, located in Shawinigan, Mauricie;
  - Laflèche College and Rue Laflèche, in Trois-Rivières;
  - Rue Laflèche, in La Tuque;
  - Rue Laflèche, in Louiseville;
  - Rue Laflèche, in Saint-Paulin;
- In the Greater Quebec City area:
  - Rue Laflèche, in Beauport, Greater Quebec City Area;
  - Rue Laflèche, in L'Ancienne-Lorette;
  - Rue Monseigneur-Laflèche, in Sainte-Foy;
- Elsewhere in Quebec:
  - Rue Laflèche, in Montreal;
  - Rue Monseigneur-Laflèche, in Boucherville, Montérégie.

Also, the former federal electoral district of Saint-Maurice—Laflèche and the village of Lafleche, Saskatchewan were named in his honour.
