= Aigai (Aeolis) =

Archaeological site in Turkey

- Αἰγαί, Αἰγαῖαι (Ancient Greek)
- Aigaiai
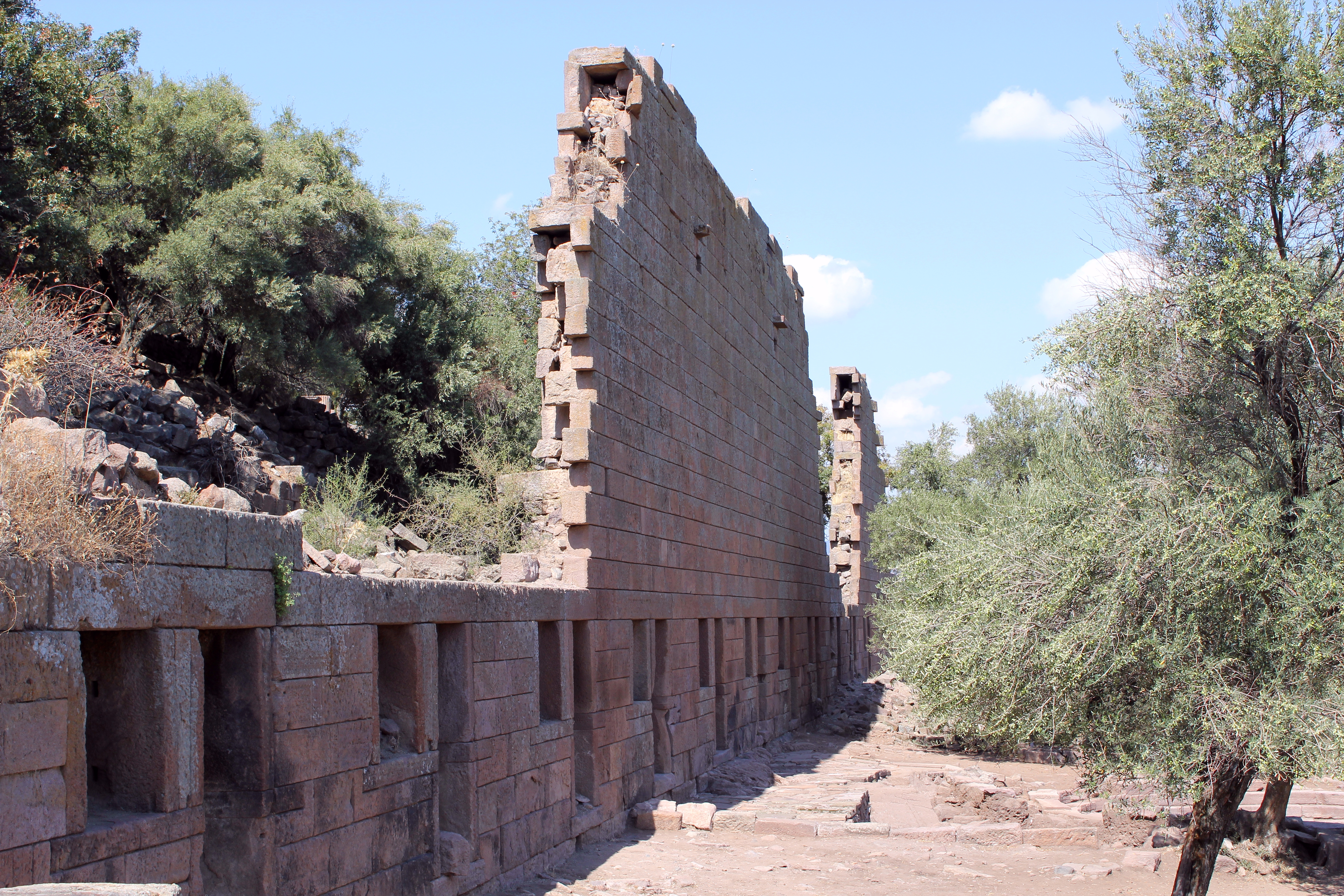
- Facade of Aigai's market hall

- Location within Turkey
- 38°49′52″N 27°11′19″E
- Type: Settlement
- Location: Yuntdağı Köseler, Manisa Province, Turkey
- Region: Aeolis

Site notes
- Condition: Ruins
- Owner: Public
- Public access: Yes

Aigai, also Aigaiai (Ancient Greek: Αἰγαί or Αἰγαῖαι; Latin: Aegae or Aegaeae; Turkish: Nemrutkale or Nemrut Kalesi), was an ancient Greek, later Roman (Ægæ, Aegae), city and bishopric in Aeolis. Aegae is mentioned by both Herodotus and Strabo as being a member of the Aeolian dodecapolis. It was also an important sanctuary of Apollo. Aigai had its brightest period under the Attalid dynasty, which ruled from nearby Pergamon in the 3rd and 2nd century BC.

The remains of the city are located near the modern village of Yuntdağı Köseler in Manisa Province, Turkey. The archaeological site is situated at a rather high altitude almost on top of Mount Gün (Dağı), part of the mountain chain of Yunt (Dağları).

== History ==
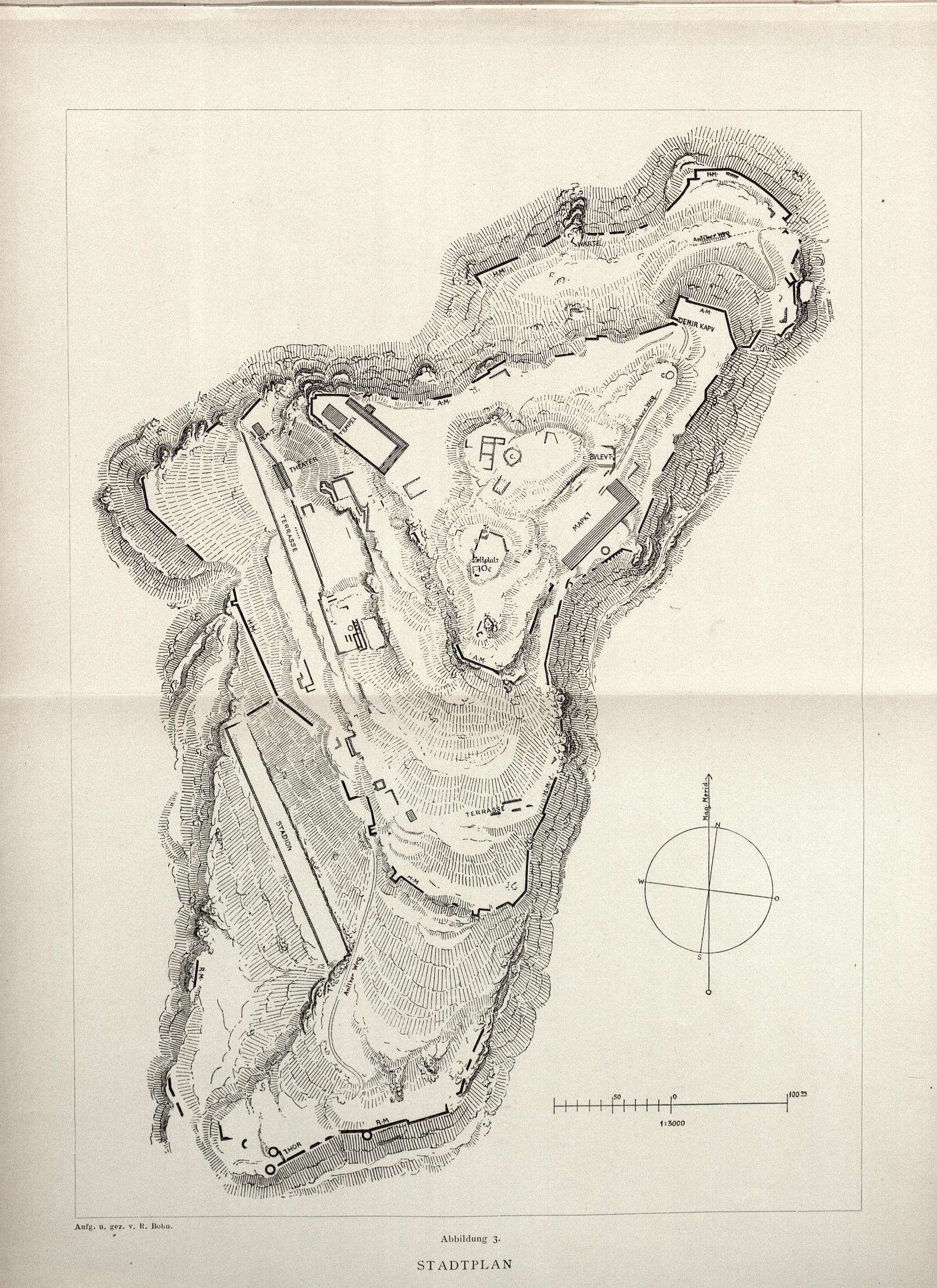
Plan of Aigai drawn by Richard Bohn in 1889

Initially the city was a possession of the Lydian Empire and later the Achaemenid Empire when it conquered the former. In the early third century BC it became part of the Kingdom of Pergamon. It changed hands from Pergamon to the Seleucid Empire, but was recaptured by Attalus I of Pergamon in 218 BC.

In the war between Bithynia and Pergamon, it was destroyed by Prusias II of Bithynia in 156 BC. After a peace was brokered by the Romans, the city was compensated with hundred talents. Under the rule of Pergamon a market building and a temple to Apollo were constructed.

In 129 BC the Kingdom of Pergamon became part of the Roman Empire. The city was destroyed by an earthquake in 17 AD and received aid for reconstruction from emperor Tiberius.

=== Ecclesiastical history ===
Ægæ was important enough in the Roman province of Asia Prima to become one of the many suffragans of its capital Ephesus's Metropolitan Archbishopric; but it was to fade.

=== Titular see ===
The diocese was nominally restored in 1933 as titular bishopric.

It has sat vacant for decades, having had the following incumbents, all of the lowest (episcopal) rank:

- Titular Bishop Gérard-Marie Coderre (1951.07.05 – 1955.02.03)
- Titular Bishop Marius Paré (1956.02.07 – 1961.02.18)
- Titular Bishop Cornélio Chizzini, Sons of Divine Providence (F.D.P.) (1962.04.12 – 1978.05.26)

== Remains ==
=== Layout ===
The city is situated on a plateau at the summit of the steep Gün Dağı mountain, which can be climbed from the north. The plateau is surrounded by a wall with a length of 1.5 kilometers. On the eastern side are the remains of the three-story indoor market with a height of 11 meters and a length of 82 meters. The upper floor of the Hellenistic building was renovated in Roman times. The partially overgrown remains of many other buildings are scattered over the site. These include the acropolis which is laid out in terraces, a Macellum, a gymnasium, a bouleuterion and the foundations of three temples.

About five kilometers to the east the foundations of a sanctuary of Apollo are found on the banks of the river which flows around the ruins. It was an Ionic order peripteros temple from the first century BC. A cella which is six meters high and three monoliths still remain.

=== Excavation history ===
The first western visitors of Aigai were William Mitchell Ramsay and Salomon Reinach in 1880. They reported about their visit in the Journal of Hellenic Studies and the Bulletin de Correspondance Hellénique. They were followed by Richard Bohn and Carl Schuchhardt, who examined the site as a part of the excavations in Pergamon.

Since 2004 the site is being excavated by Ersin Doğer of Ege University in İzmir. By 2010 the access road, the bouleuterion, the odeon, shops, numerous water pipes and large parts of the market hall were uncovered. For the coming years it is planned to re-erect the market hall's facade with the original stones.

In 2016, archaeologists discovered a mosaic depicting the god Poseidon. The mosaic was found in the frigidarium part of the ancient bath. The bottom part of the mosaic contains partly ruined inscription in Greek: "Greetings to all of you bathing." Archaeologists believe that it dates back to the 3rd or 4th century B.C.

In 2018, archaeologists unearthed a Macellum, which is an ancient meat and fish market.

In 2022 a marble inscription of the 2nd century AD during the excavations in the parliament building of Aigai found in 2005 was deciphered and records the people's complaints at Roman tax officials' greed. It also states that they sent a man named 'Fortunatus' to the Roman emperor to report on the various levels of taxes from goat skin by each tax collector and demanding that he solve the problem. The inscription is important in proving that the city's trade was based on goats and goat skins. The Roman Emperor later passed a law to fix the rate of tax from goat skin at 1/6th and threatened to enforce it strictly.

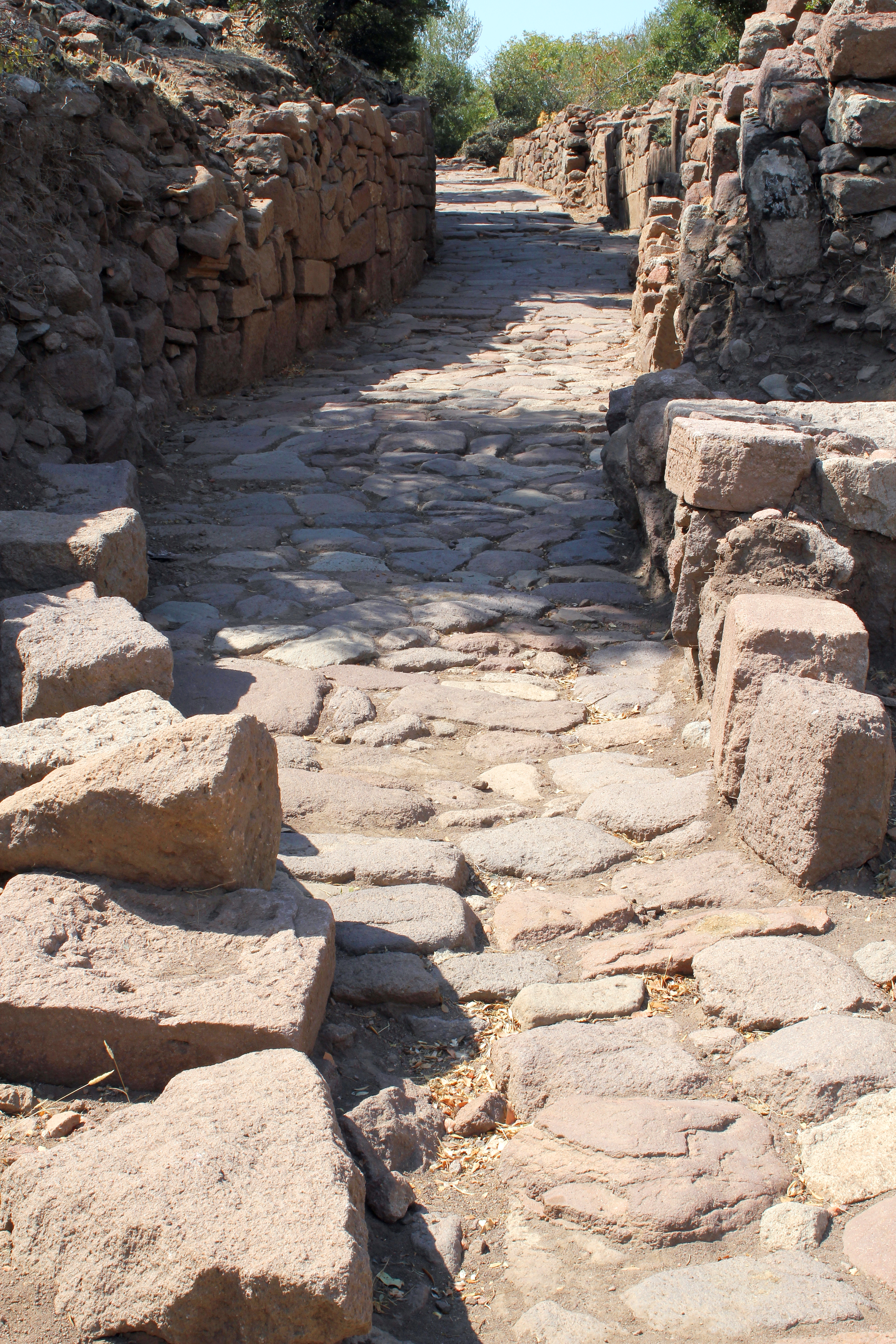
Path to Aigai

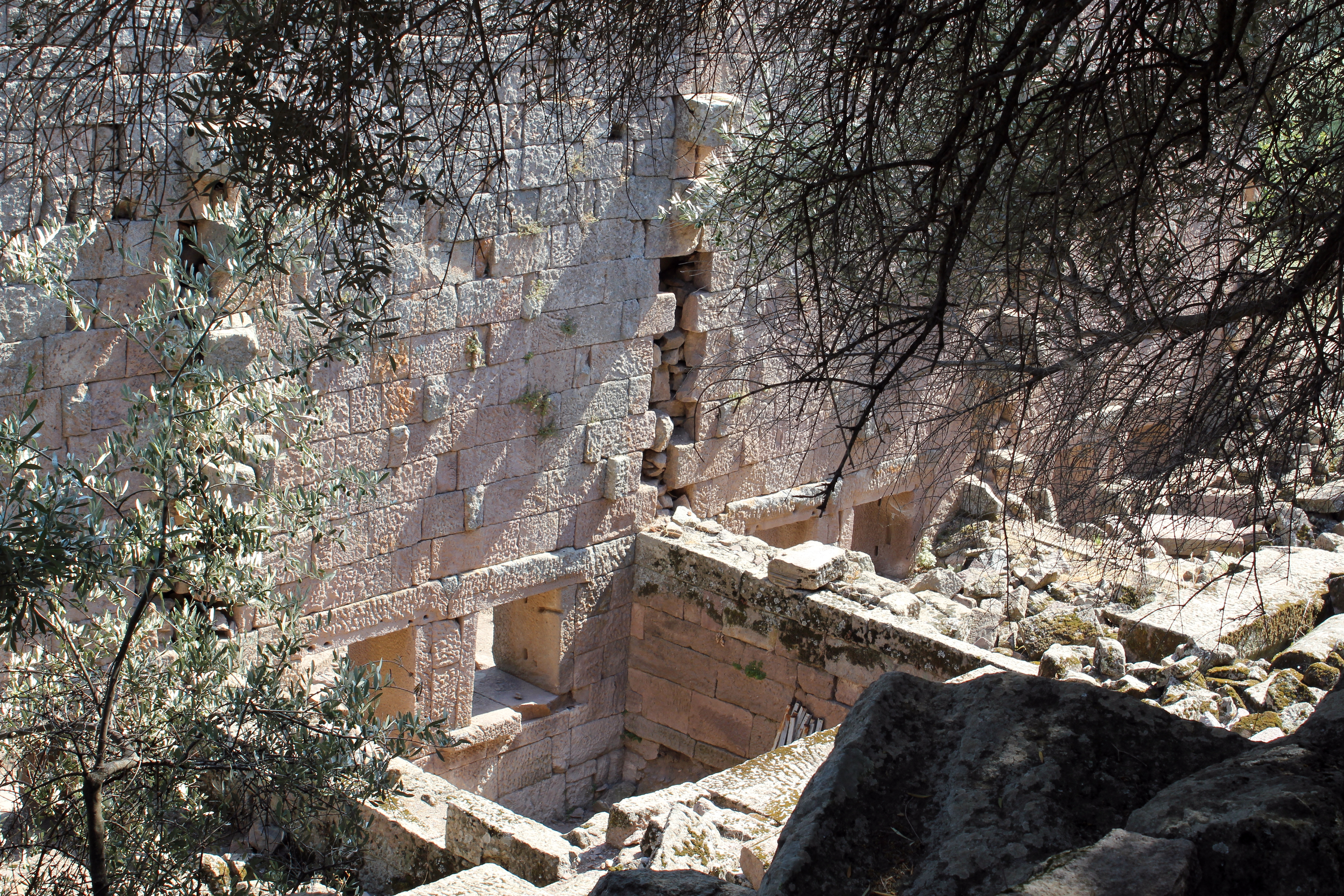
Facade of market hall seen from the interior

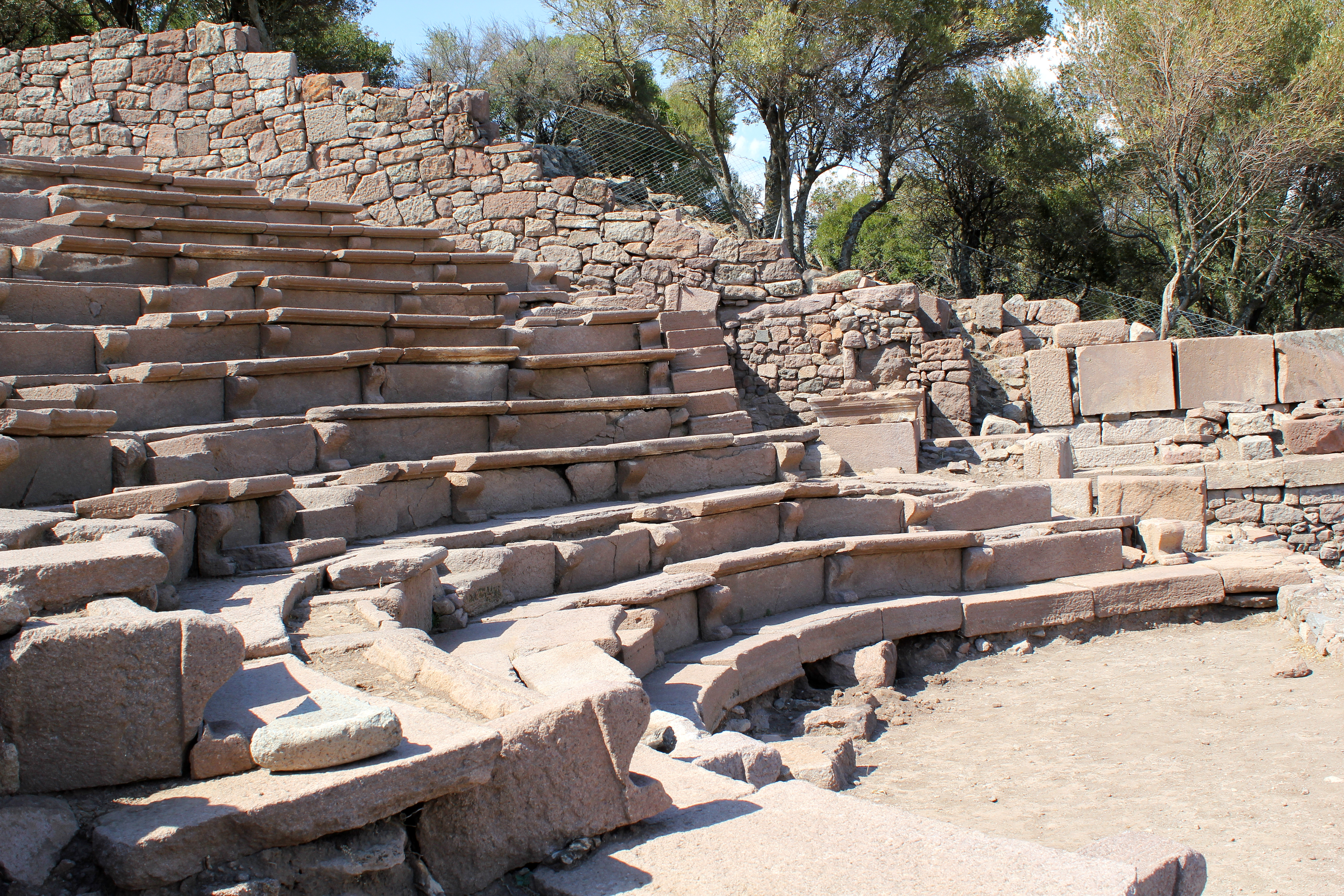
Bouleuterion

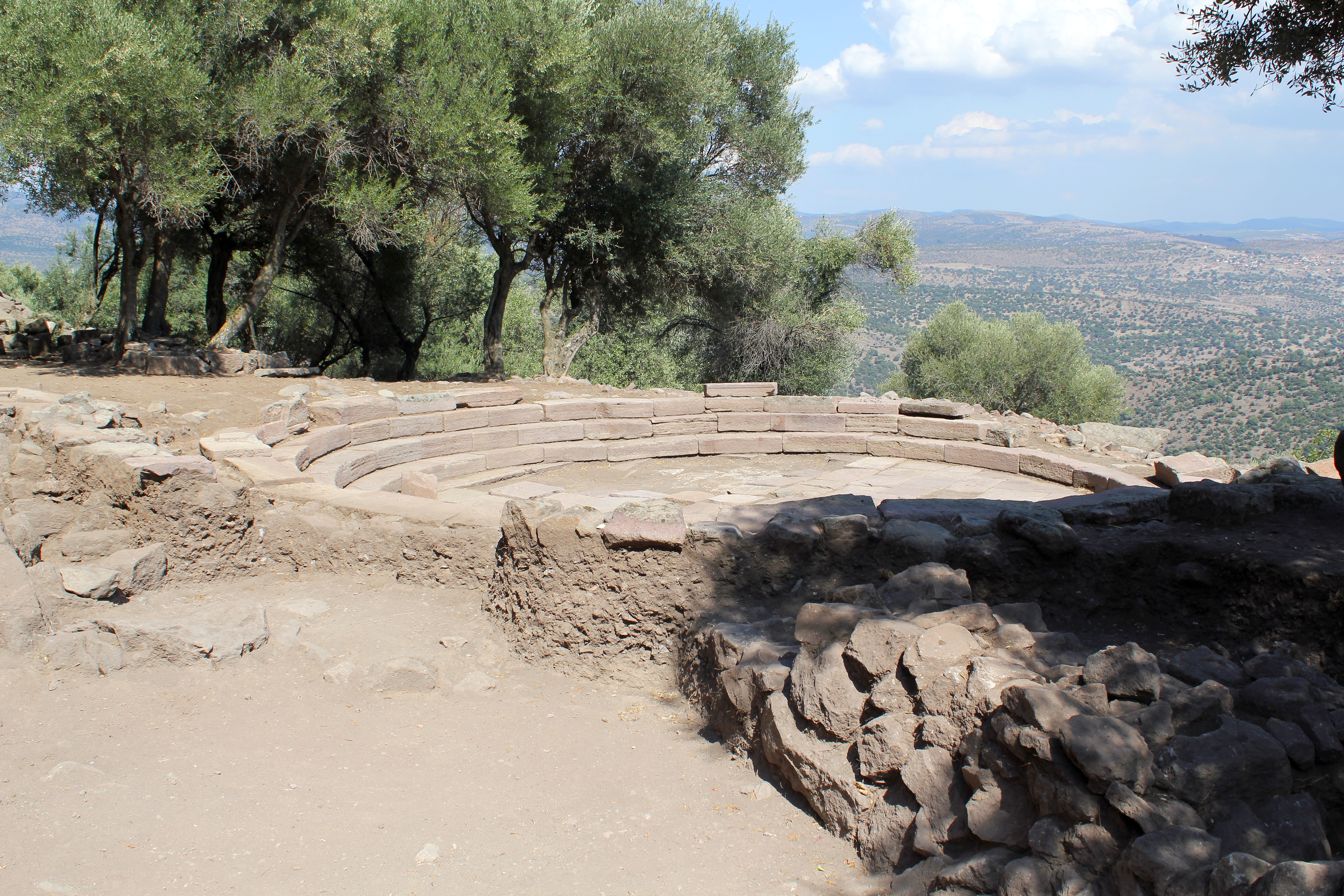
Macellum

== Sources and external links ==
- GCatholic with titular incumebt biography links
- Official website of Aigai Excavations (in Turkish)
- Official website of Aigai Excavations (in English)
- More photos of the site
- Ancient Coinage of Aeolis, Aegae
- Hellenistic Inscriptions from Aigai
- Description of Aigai on Current Archeology in Turkey
