= Thomas Cooke (bishop) =

- Bishop of Trois Rivières
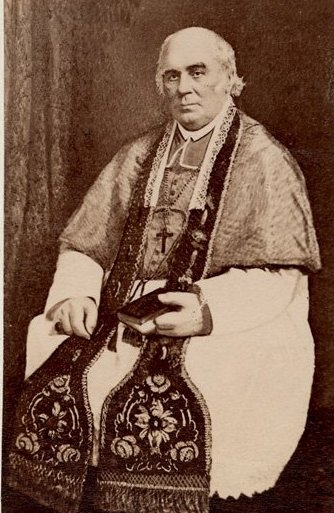
- Diocese: Trois Rivières
- Installed: October 18, 1852
- Term ended: April 30, 1870
- Predecessor: None
- Successor: Louis-François Richer Laflèche

Orders
- Ordination: September 9, 1814

Personal details
- Born: February 9, 1792 Pointe-du-Lac, Lower Canada
- Died: April 30, 1870 (aged 78) Trois-Rivières, Quebec
- Denomination: Roman Catholic
- Parents: John Thomas Cooke and Isabelle Guay

Thomas Cooke (February 9, 1792 – April 30, 1870) was a Canadian Roman Catholic priest, missionary, and the first Bishop of Trois Rivières from 1852 to 1870.
