= Roch Pedneault =

Canadian Roman Catholic bishop

Roch Pedneault (10 April 1927 – 10 March 2018) was a Catholic bishop.

Pedneault was ordained to the priesthood in 1953. He served as titular bishop of 'Aggersei' and as auxiliary bishop of the Diocese of Chicoutimi, Quebec, Canada, from 1974 to 2002.
