= Jean-Guy Hamelin =

Canadian Roman Catholic bishop

- Bishop of Rouyn-Noranda, Quebec
- Diocese: Rouyn-Noranda
- Installed: 1949
- Term ended: 2001
- Predecessor: Diocese erected in 1973.
- Successor: Dorylas Moreau

Orders
- Ordination: June 11, 1949

Personal details
- Born: 1925 Saint-Sévérin-de-Proulxville, Quebec, Canada
- Died: 2018 (aged 92–93) Rouyn-Noranda, Quebec, Canada
- Denomination: Catholic
- Occupation: clergy
- Profession: priest, bishop

Jean-Guy Hamelin (October 8, 1925 – March 1, 2018) was a Canadian Catholic bishop.

Born in 1925 in Saint-Sévérin-de-Proulxville, Hamelin was ordained to the priesthood on June 11, 1949, in Trois-Rivières, Québec and was named first bishop of the Roman Catholic Diocese of Rouyn-Noranda, Canada on November 29, 1973. He retired on November 30, 2001, succeeded by Dorylas Moreau and named Bishop Emeritus.

Hamelin died on March 1, 2018, aged 92 in Rouyn-Noranda.
