= Marymount Academy (Sudbury) =

Location
- 165 D'Youville Street; Greater Sudbury, Ontario, P3C 5E7; Canada

Information
- Funding type: Catholic high school
- Motto: Disce ut Vivas
- Religious affiliation: Catholic Church
- Established: 1956
- School board: Sudbury Catholic District School Board
- Principal: Stephanie Venturi
- Grades: 7–12
- Colours: Navy Blue and Burgundy
- Mascot: lioness with crown
- Team name: Regals
- Website: marymount.sudburycatholicschools.ca

Marymount Academy is a middle and high school in Greater Sudbury, Ontario, which offers Catholic education for girls in Grades 7 through 12. The school serves between 400 and 600 students.

== History ==
The school originally opened in 1956 as Marymount College, an all girls' high school founded by the Sisters of St. Joseph, equivalent to the all boys' St. Charles College. Following St. Charles' conversion to a co-educational school in 1993, enrolment at Marymount began to decline. In 1996. The school added Grades 7 and 8 education, and developed a special focus on enriched academic education for young women, changing its name to the current Marymount Academy.

== Trivia ==
Marymount Academy's motto is 'Disce ut Vivas', which is the Latin version of 'Learn That You May Live'. The school's official colours are navy blue and burgundy. Students wear uniforms, generally a kilt/pants and a top/hoodie in school colours. Grade 12 students enrolled in a Specialist High Skills Major (SHSM) also receive a special uniform for the year.

The school is located at 165 D'Youville Street near the city's downtown core, a facility shared with the head office of the Sudbury Catholic District School Board. Marymount is heavily involved in fundraising for the Sudbury community, and participates and initiates events such as canned food drives, pep rallies, and charity benefits. Several times each year, students and faculty attend mass at Christ The King Church, their parish.

In 2009, The Fraser Institute, an independent research and education organization, ranked Marymount as the fourth best elementary/high school in the province. Marymount ranked a 9.8 out of 10, based on standardized test results and other factors.

== Athletics ==
Marymount offers a wide array of athletics based classes/extracurriculars such as: Hockey, Basketball, Volleyball, Alpine Skiing, Curling, Softball, Flag Football and more.

Their Curling, Cross Country Running, and Alpine Ski team have all competed at OFSAA in the past 5 years.

The Alpine Ski team has brought home 3 consecutive medals (2024, 2025, 2026) in the High School Girls Giant Slalom.

The Cross Country Running team has brought home a gold medal in 2025 and 2 gold medals in 2026 for the Women's 800-Metre Run and 100m Dash in the ambulatory division.

== Arts ==
Marymount has a strong presence in instrumental and dramatic arts. Their Drama Club has a yearly play performance, with the show usually starting in mid April.

Marymount has two distinct concert bands,

Senior Band (10/12) Is a more advanced band, designed for former and current Junior members to elevate their skill.

Heavily focused on performance and competition, they play music from grades 2 - 4. While performing at Kiwanis Music Festival and Canada's Wonderland. They compete at the regional Northern Ontario Music Festival (NOMF) where they are adjudicated by experts. Earning High Silver or Better at NOMF awards an invite to MusicFest Canada, also known as "The Nationals."

Their most recent appearance at Nationals was in 2025, where they earned Bronze.

Junior Band (8/10) is usually the beginning band for students, teaching the grassroots of music such as sightreading, counting time, key signatures, and music terminology.

This band also performs and competes, usually at Canada's Wonderland and at the Northern Ontario Music Festival, Skipping Kiwanis entirely. However, they compete lower than Senior Band, usually at the Level 1 or 2 grade.

Junior Band earned their first-ever invite to MusicFest Canada in April 2026, and competed a month later, earning Bronze.

== See also ==
- Education in Ontario
- List of secondary schools in Ontario
