= SCDSB =

SCDSB may refer to:

- Simcoe County District School Board, Ontario, Canada
- Sudbury Catholic District School Board, Ontario, Canada
