= Thomas Dowd =

Thomas Dowd may refer to:

- Tommy Dowd (baseball) (1869–1933), baseball player
- Tommy Dowd (Gaelic footballer) (born 1969), former Meath player
- Tom Dowd (1925–2002), American recording engineer
- Thomas Dowd (bishop) (born 1970), Canadian Catholic bishop
- Tom Dowd (game designer), role-playing game designer
