= Bishop Alexander Carter Catholic Secondary School =

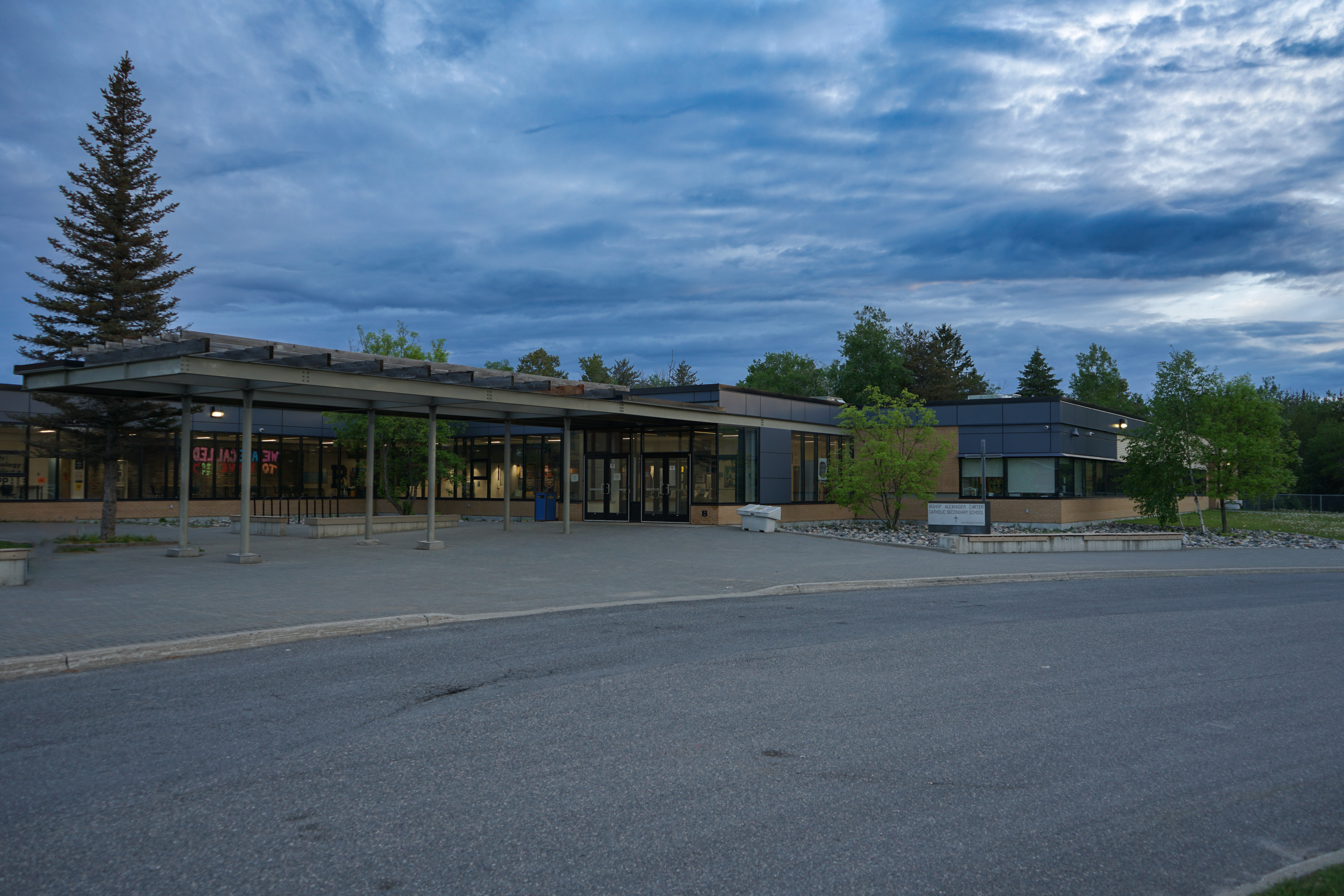
- Front of Bishop Alexander Carter CSS in Hanmer, Ontario.

Location
- 539 Francis Street; Sudbury, Ontario, P3P 1E6; Canada; 46°39′25″N 80°58′00″W

Information
- School type: Public Catholic, Separate high school
- Motto: Because we believe
- Religious affiliation: Catholic
- Founded: 2002
- School board: Sudbury Catholic District School Board
- Superintendent: Terry Papineau
- School number: 689351
- Principal: Karl Dreger (2025)
- Grades: 7–12
- Enrolment: 700+ (March 2025)
- Language: English
- Area: Rayside-Balfour; Valley East
- Colours: Yellow, Blue, White
- Mascot: Alligator
- Team name: Gators
- Website: baccss.sudburycatholicschools.ca

Bishop Alexander Carter Catholic Secondary School is a Roman Catholic high school in Greater Sudbury, Ontario, Canada, located on Francis Street in the community of Hanmer.

The school was established by the Sudbury Catholic District School Board in 2002 as the city's third coeducational Catholic high school. It primarily serves students from the Valley East and Rayside-Balfour areas of Sudbury. The school was named in honour of Alexander Carter, the former bishop of the Roman Catholic Diocese of Sault Sainte Marie, Ontario who had died earlier in 2002.

== See also ==
- Education in Ontario
- List of secondary schools in Ontario
