= Anishinabe Spiritual Centre =

Coordinates: 46.229458°N 81.732781°W

- Ojibwe: Wassean-dimi-Kaning
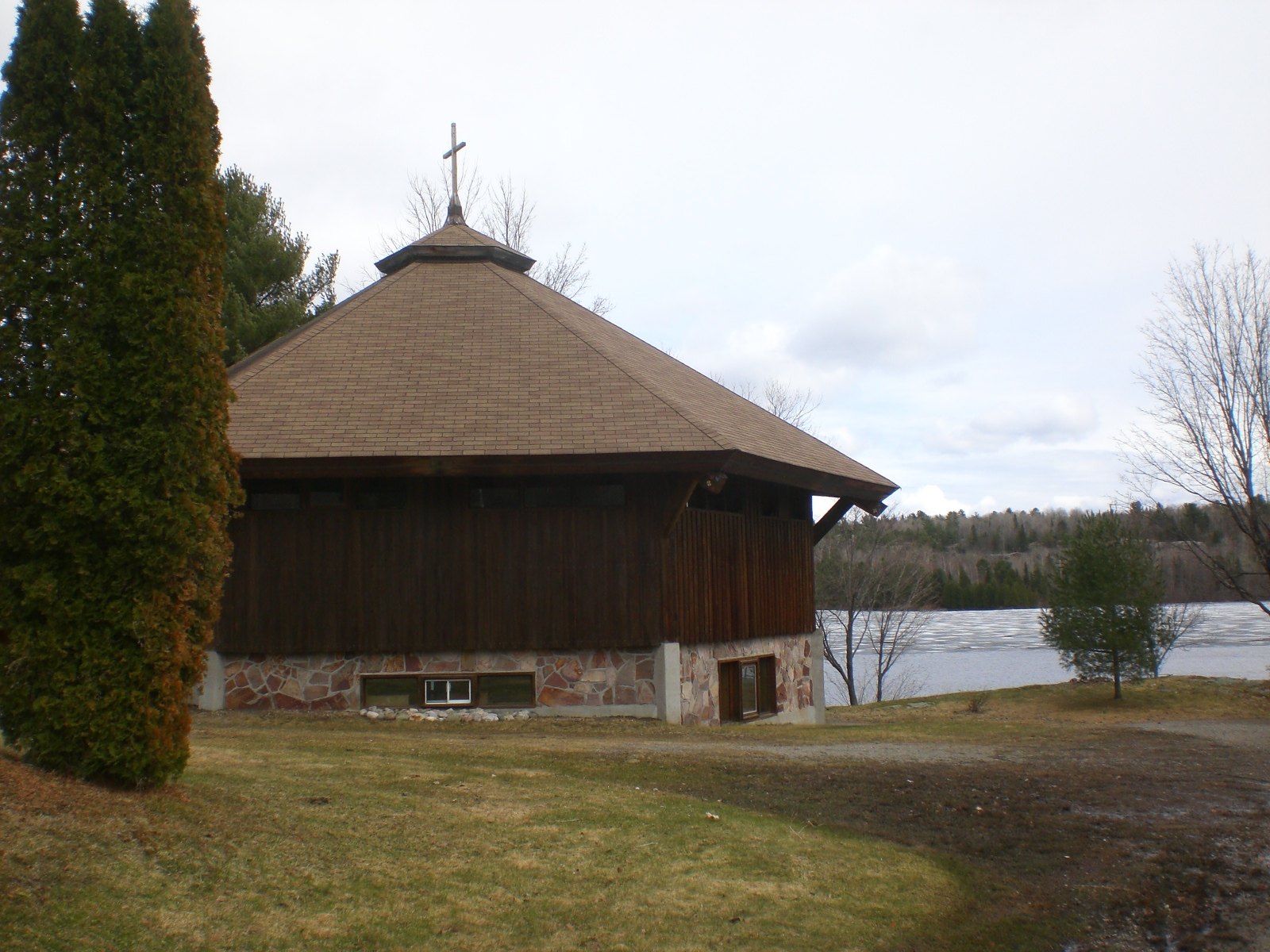
- View of chapel and Anderson Lake

- Location in Ontario
- Location: Espanola, Ontario
- Country: Canada
- Denomination: Roman Catholic
- Website: AnishinabeSpiritualCentre.ca

History
- Status: Active
- Founded: 1972
- Founder: Society of Jesus

Architecture
- Functional status: Training and Spirituality centre
- Groundbreaking: 1982
- Completed: June 1985

Administration
- Province: Kingston
- Diocese: Sault Sainte Marie
- Parish: St. Jude, Espanola

Anishinabe Spiritual Centre (Ojibwe: Wassean-dimi-Kaning) is a Roman Catholic centre for Ignatian spirituality and training in ministry run by the Society of Jesus in Espanola, Ontario, specifically for the local First Nation people in the area. It is situated to the south of Espanola, on the shore of Anderson Lake, just off Ontario Highway 6. Since it was founded, it has been the only place in northern Ontario that has offered Roman Catholic ministerial training to Aboriginal peoples in Canada.

== History ==
=== Foundation ===
After the Second Vatican Council, there were efforts made in Canada to increase the number of permanent deacons. From 1972 until 1979, there was a diaconate training programme, run by the Jesuits, in northern Ontario. It was supported by the Bishop of Sault Sainte Marie Alexander Carter. It only lasted seven years, because of the fatigue of those travelling round offering training. It was decided that a permanent location was needed for the programme.

=== Construction ===
Money was raised to build a site. Funds came from the Jesuits, and the Roman Catholic dioceses of Sault Sainte Marie, Hearst and Thunder Bay. The centre was built by volunteers who also created a sawmill on site to help with the construction. It started in 1982. By 1984, the main building and the chapel were completed. In 1985, the remaining outlying buildings were finished. In June 1985, it was opened by Bishop Carter.

=== Establishment ===
Although its main purpose was to train men for the diaconate. The centre also trained women for the Diocesan Order of Women. Eventually, the Diocesan Order of Women changed to become Diocesan Order of Service, which both men and women could train for. In addition, monthly Ministries weekends are provided at the centre for Roman Catholics across northern Ontario.

In the 1990s, a group of First Nation people from the centre brought the nearby Heaven's Gate trail, back into usage. Originally, it was an old trade route used by their ancestors. It runs 40 kilometres across the spine of the La Cloche Mountain range.

== Parishes ==
From the spirituality centre, the Jesuits travel out to serve various churches in the area, such as:

=== Holy Cross Church, Wiikwemkoong ===
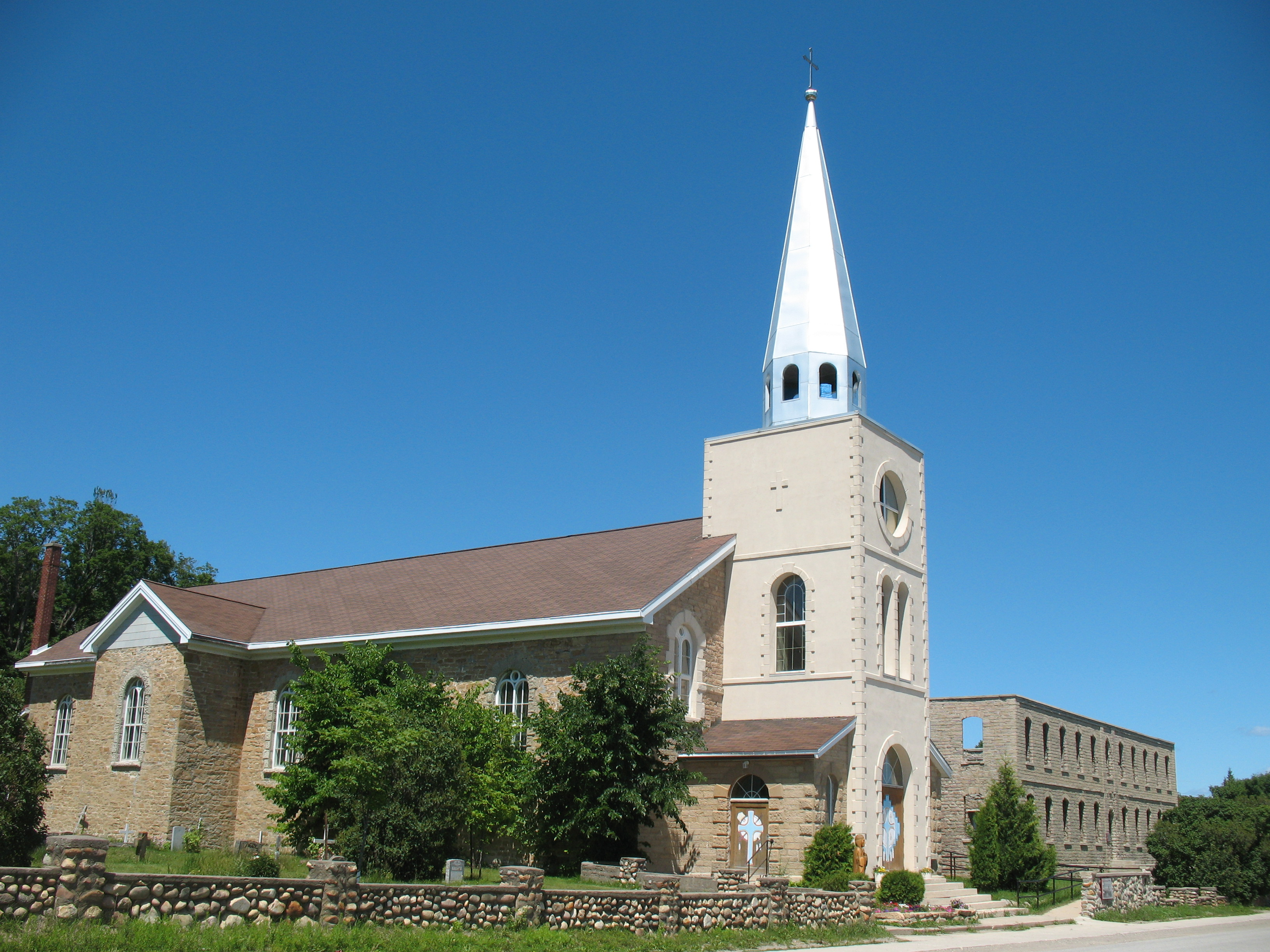
Holy Cross Church, Wiikwemkoong

As well as the spirituality centre, the Jesuits serve the Anishinaabe also through the Holy Cross Church in the Wiikwemkoong Unceded Reserve.

=== St. Raphael Church, Sagamok ===
St. Raphael Church is for the Sagamok Anishnawbek First Nation, a reserve, west of Sudbury, Ontario. The reserve is one of the largest in the region and has a population of 2,200. The reserve is spread across 27,000 acres. The church is a white brick building. The interior walls are white pine. Above the altar is a picture of Jesus Christ appearing in a First Nation person's vision.

=== Our Lady of the Highway Church, Cutler ===
The priest of St. Raphael Church also helps at the Our Lady of the Highway Church of the Serpent River First Nation in Cutler, Ontario. In 2001, the Serpent River community in Cutler consists of 289 people in 142 housing units. It is located by Lake Huron, 40 km east of Blind River, Ontario.

=== Immaculate Conception Church, Manitoulin ===
Within the M'Chigeeng First Nation in Manitoulin District is the Church of the Immaculate Conception. It is situated across the street from the Ojibwe Cultural Museum. The original church structure was founded in 1854, by a Fr. Fremiot, but has its roots in the Jesuit missions to the island in 1648–1650. In 1971, the original building was destroyed in a propane tank explosion. The new building, constructed in 1972, was influenced by the Second Vatican Council's decrees on liturgy. It is a round building, with a conical roof; the shape of a teepee. Inside the church, the stations of the cross were painted by Leland Bell.

=== Immaculate Heart of Mary Church, Gore Bay ===
From the Immaculate Conception Church, the priest travels to Immaculate Heart of Mary Church, which serves the Catholic population of Gore Bay, Ontario. Gore Bay is one of the two incorporated towns in the Manitoulin District.

=== St. Joseph Church, Sheshegwaning ===
The priest from Immaculate Conception Church also travels to St. Joseph's Church in Sheshegwaning on the east coast of Manitoulin. It is situated close to the Kenjgewin Teg Educational Institute.

== Gallery ==
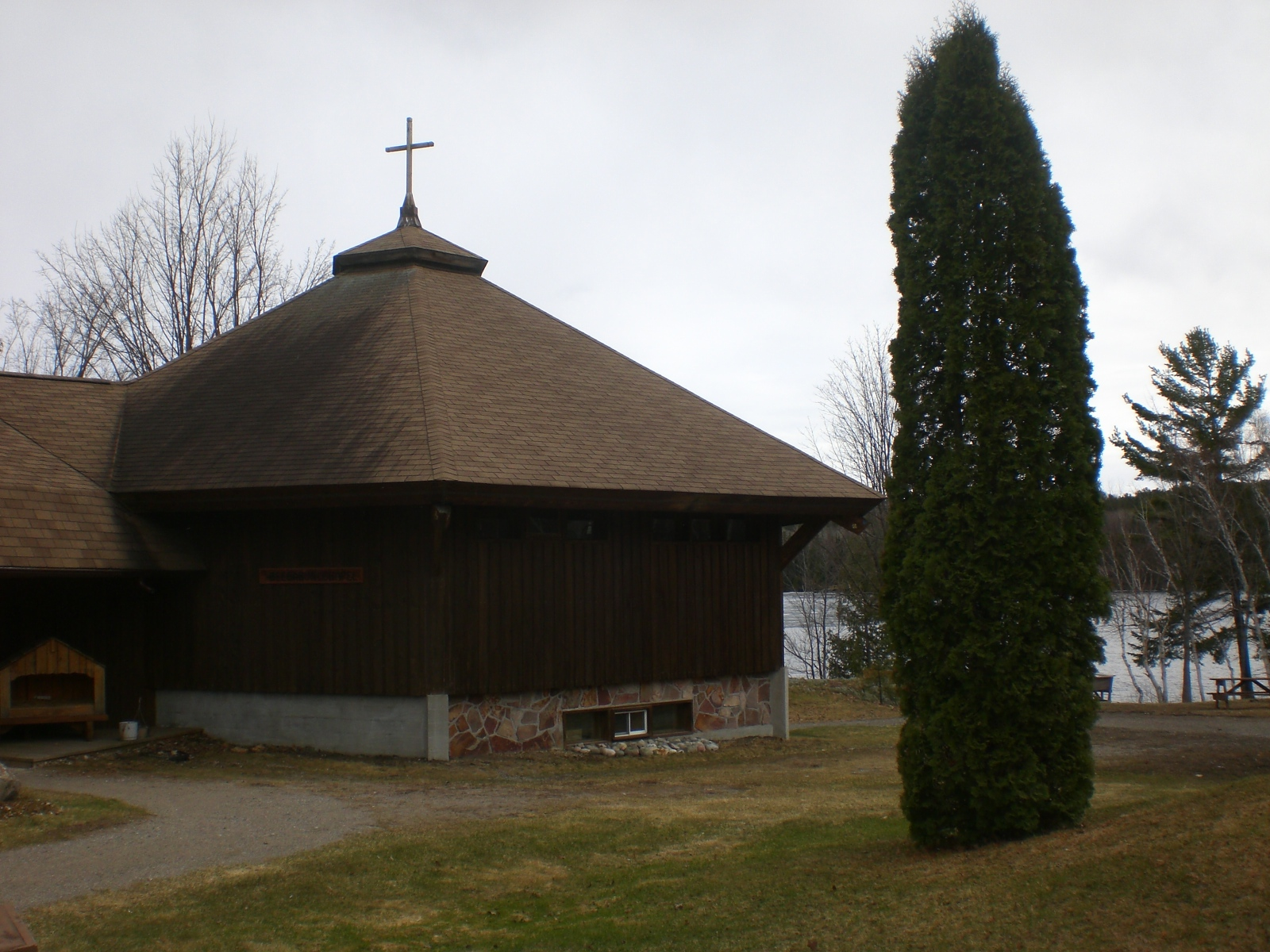
Chapel

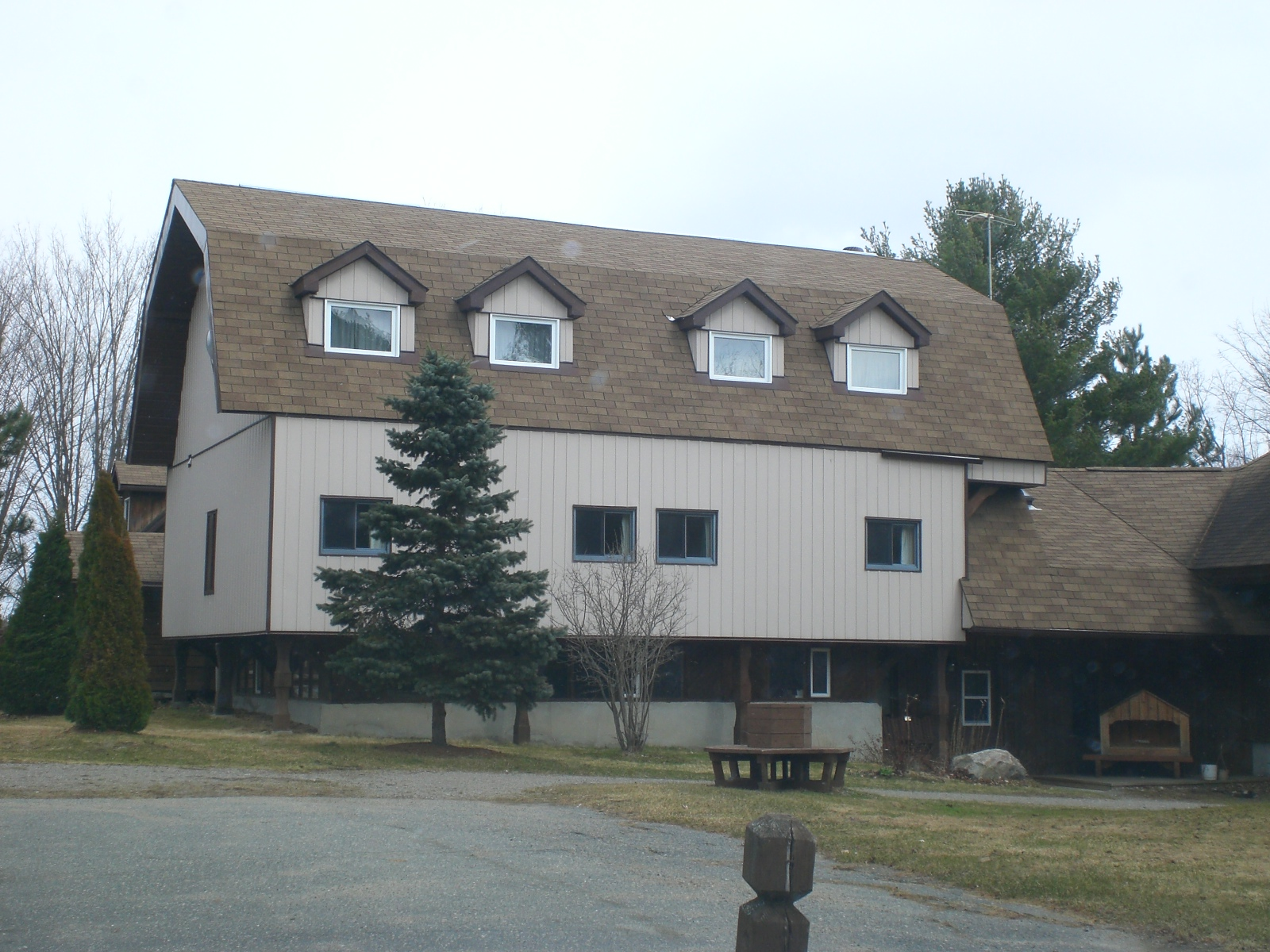
Main building

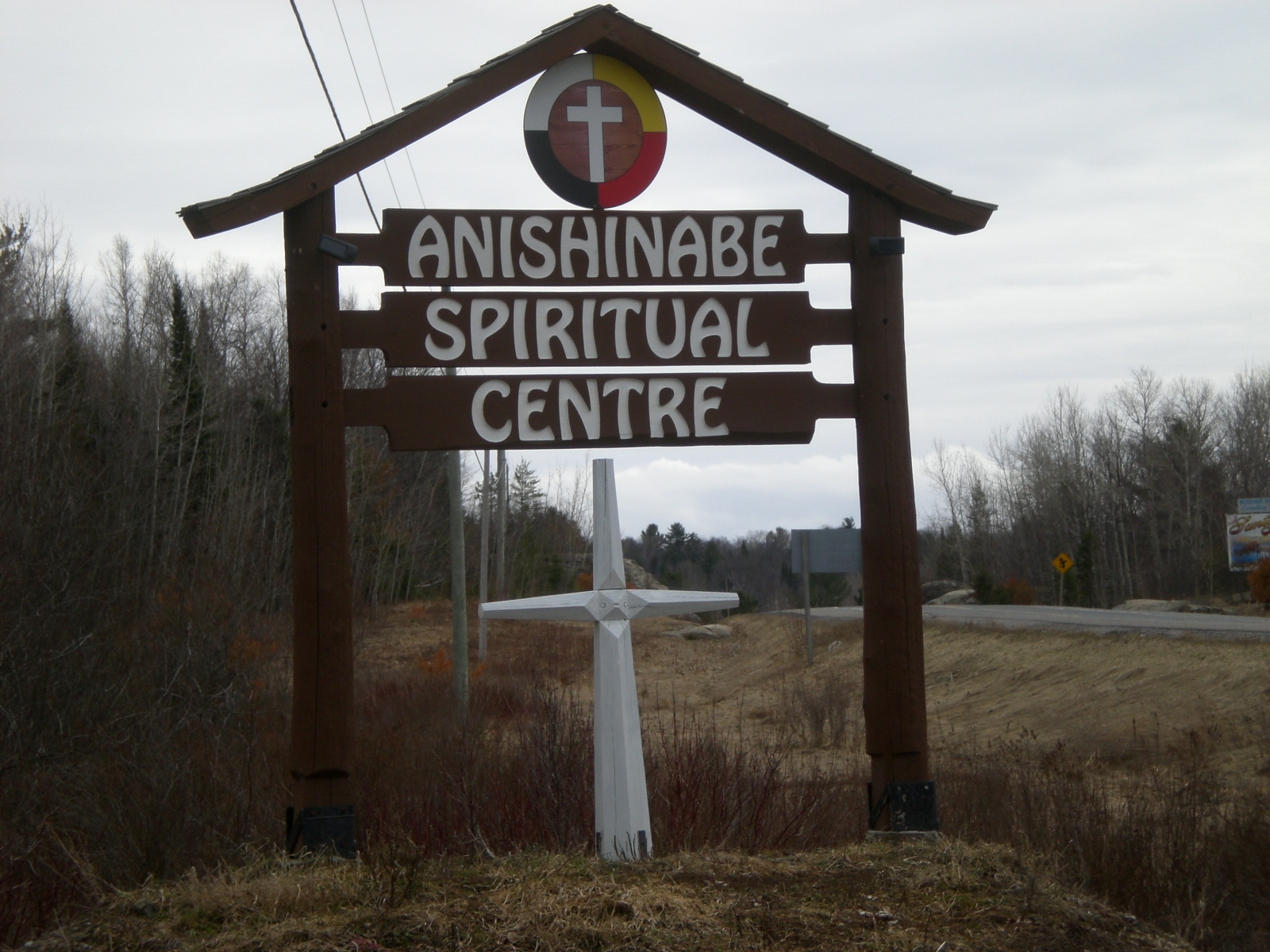
Sign

== See also ==
- List of Jesuit sites
- St. Andrew's Church, Thunder Bay
