= Joseph-Aurèle Plourde =

Canadian Catholic archbishop (1915–2013)

The Most Reverend Joseph-Aurèle Plourde
- Archbishop of Ottawa
- Church: Catholic Church
- Archdiocese: Ottawa
- Province: Ottawa
- Metropolis: Ottawa
- Installed: 1967
- Term ended: 1989
- Predecessor: Marie-Joseph Lemieux
- Successor: Marcel Gervais

Orders
- Ordination: May 7, 1944
- Consecration: August 26, 1964 by Sergio Pignedoli

Personal details
- Born: January 12, 1915 Saint-François-de-Madawaska, New Brunswick
- Died: January 5, 2013 (aged 97) Ottawa, Ontario, Canada
- Denomination: Roman Catholic
- Residence: Ottawa, Ontario Canada
- Parents: Antoine Plourde and Suzanne Albert
- Occupation: clergy
- Education: St. Joseph College Memramcook; Holy Heart Seminary, Halifax, Nova Scotia

Joseph-Aurèle Plourde, OC (January 12, 1915 – January 5, 2013) was a Canadian Roman Catholic bishop. He was the archbishop of the Archdiocese of Ottawa from 1967 to 1989.

== Early life ==
Plourde was born in Saint-François-de-Madawaska, New Brunswick, to Antoine Plourde and Suzanne Albert, the eighth of eleven children. and attended the St. Joseph College in Memramcook, New Brunswick and Holy Heart Seminary in Halifax, Novia Scotia, before becoming ordained as a priest in 1944. Besides his priesthood, Plourde was also professor of social studies and philosophy at Saint-Louis College in Edmundston, New Brunswick.

== Appointments ==
In 1964 he was appointed auxiliary bishop of Alexandria in Ontario and, in 1967, he was made archbishop of the Roman Catholic Archdiocese of Ottawa. In 1966 and 1967, among many other activities during his ministry, Plourde was instrumental in chairing a committee that set up the Canadian bishops' international development agency (the Canadian Catholic Organization for Development and Peace). He attended the Second Vatican Council and helped to restructure the Canadian bishops' conference- the Canadian Catholic Conference, which was renamed the Canadian Conference of Catholic Bishops in 1977 (he served as president of the conference from 1969-1971). Plourde was also a vice president and a founding member of the Ontario Conference of Catholic Bishops, now the Assembly of Catholic Bishops of Ontario. Plourde was also instrumental in establishing a French-speaking secondary school system in Ontario, first public, then Catholic.

He retired as Archbishop of Ottawa in 1989, and was succeeded by Archbishop Marcel Gervais. The same year, Plourde was made an Officer of the Order of Canada.

Plourde, serving as an archbishop emeritus, died on January 5, 2013, in Ottawa, at the age of 98, Ottawa's Archbishop Terrence Prendergast, SJ was scheduled to celebrate his predecessor's Funeral Mass on January 11, 2013, at Notre-Dame Cathedral Basilica. Immediately afterward, Plourde's remains were to be entombed in the Archbishop's Chapel at the cathedral basilica.

== Unexamined role in Ottawa child-sexual abuse cases within the diocese ==
Publicly available records from the 1980s raise serious questions about Plourde's accountability and knowledge of widespread sexual abuse of children by several priests within the Ottawa diocese throughout the 1970s and early 1980s, all occurring under his tenure as archbishop. Newspaper and court records from the 1980s document cases involving at least 11 abuser priests: all of whom were under Plourde's authority as archbishop of the Ottawa diocese.

Newspaper reports from 1986 note that parents of the abuse victims "approached police in March of that year after becoming frustrated by the inaction of Archbishop Plourde and Bishop Beahan". In June 1986, Plourde was quoted on the record blaming the media, parishioners and the victims' families for having come forward with allegations that ultimately led to the criminal conviction of Dale Crampton, among other priests within his diocese. Allegations also surfaced on the public record in 1986 that Plourde had threatened one of the earliest whistleblowers with excommunication for "scandalmongering," should they go public with their claims about Crampton. Questions about Plourde's role were raised in a June 2, 1986 Ottawa Citizen editorial in the wake of Crampton's arrest. "Circumstances surrounding allegations that two local priests have been sexually abusing children compel one to question the way church officials have handled complaints of abuse. The evidence suggests the best interests of children may have been submerged beneath the clergy’s inclination to protect its own."

New allegations surfaced in May 2016, when retired Catholic priest Barry McGrory publicly admitted that he sexually abused three young parishioners at Ottawa's Holy Cross Parish in the 1970s and ’80s. This also occurred under Plourde's tenure as archbishop of the Ottawa diocese. These allegations were reported by The Ottawa Citizen, including McGrory's claims that Plourde was aware of the abuse occurring within his diocese. While McGrory was convicted of multiple counts of sexual assault in 2019, it is unclear whether his specific 2016 claims were tested in court, but were not refuted by the diocese.

Also in 2016--more than 35 years after this series of criminal acts took place--the Ottawa archdiocese and its current archbishop publicly acknowledged "the enormity of evil" in connection to the cases, but have remained mute on Plourde's knowledge of the abuses that occurred under his watch.

To this date, the Ottawa archdiocese refuses to comment on or confirm the total number of sexual abuse cases before the courts in which it is named as defendant. The diocese remains among those in Canada that have, to date, not followed the example set in 2023 by the Jesuits of Canada, which published a list of those in its ranks credibly accused of sexual abuse of minors.
