= St. Benedict Catholic Secondary School (Sudbury) =

Location
- 2993 Algonquin Road; Greater Sudbury, Ontario, P3E 4X5; Canada

Information
- Funding type: Catholic high school
- Religious affiliation: Catholic Church
- Established: 1996
- School board: Sudbury Catholic District School Board
- Principal: Beverley Belanger
- Grades: 7–12
- Colours: Dark blue, darkgreen and white
- Mascot: Polar Bear
- Team name: Bears
- Website: st-benedict.sudburycatholicschools.ca

St. Benedict Catholic Secondary School is a high school in Greater Sudbury, Ontario, run by the Sudbury Catholic District School Board. Located on Algonquin Road in the city's south end, the school opened in 1996. The school has a population of just over 700 students. Its mascot is a polar bear.

== See also ==
- Education in Ontario
- List of secondary schools in Ontario
