= Precious Blood Cathedral =

Cathedral in Ontario, Canada

Coordinates: 46.5075°N 84.3259°W

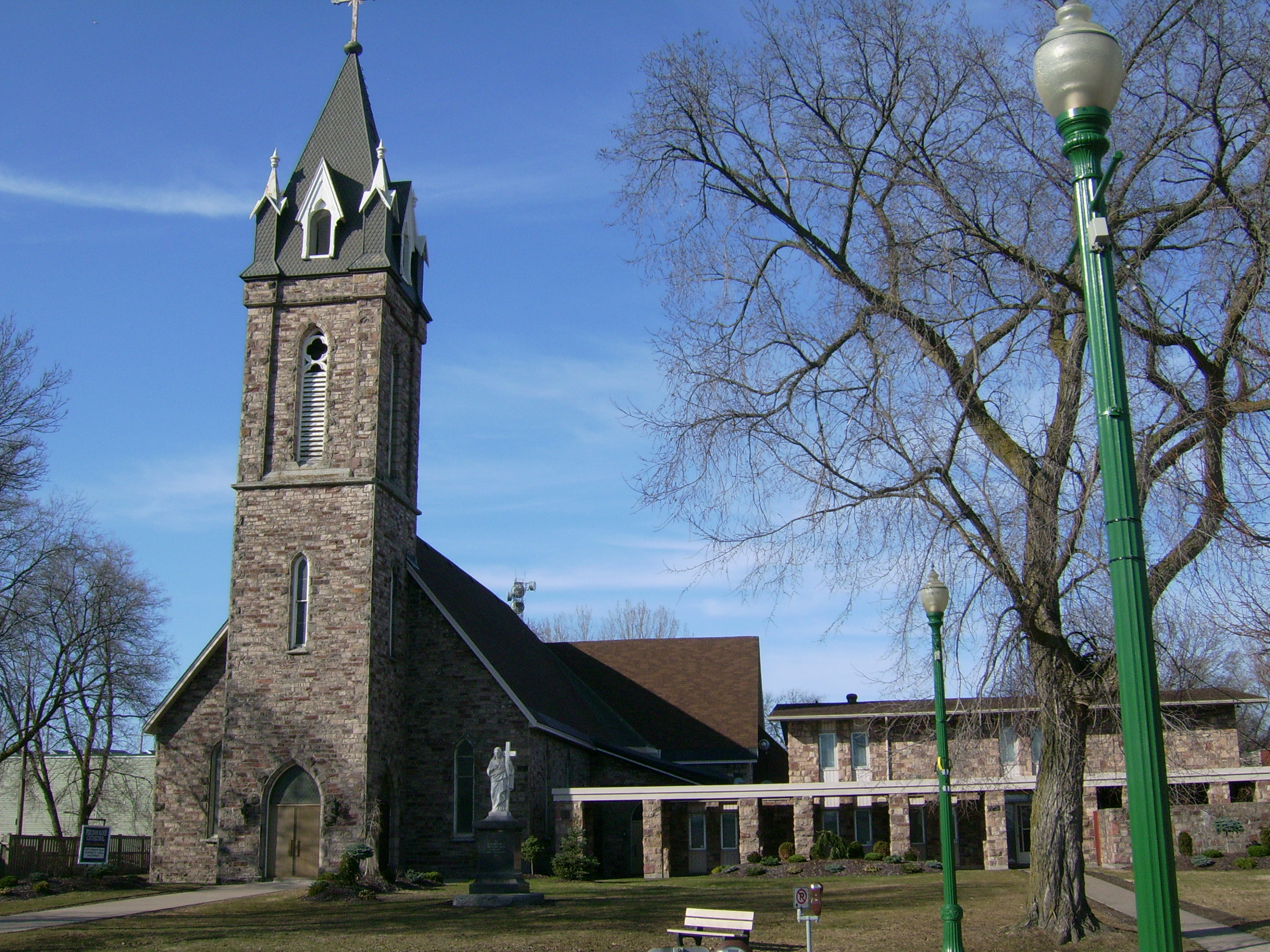

Religion
- Affiliation: Roman Catholic Church
- Province: Roman Catholic Diocese of Sault Sainte Marie, Ontario
- Rite: Roman Rite
- Leadership: Rev. Hamish Currie; Rev. Ignatius Xavier

Location
- Location: 778 Queen Street East; Sault Ste. Marie, Ontario; Canada
- Interactive map of Precious Blood Cathedral

Architecture
- Style: Gothic revival
- Completed: 1875
- Materials: sandstone

Website
- www.preciousbloodssm.com

Precious Blood Cathedral is the mother church of the Roman Catholic Diocese of Sault Sainte Marie, Ontario. The cathedral is located in Sault Ste. Marie, Ontario.

== History ==
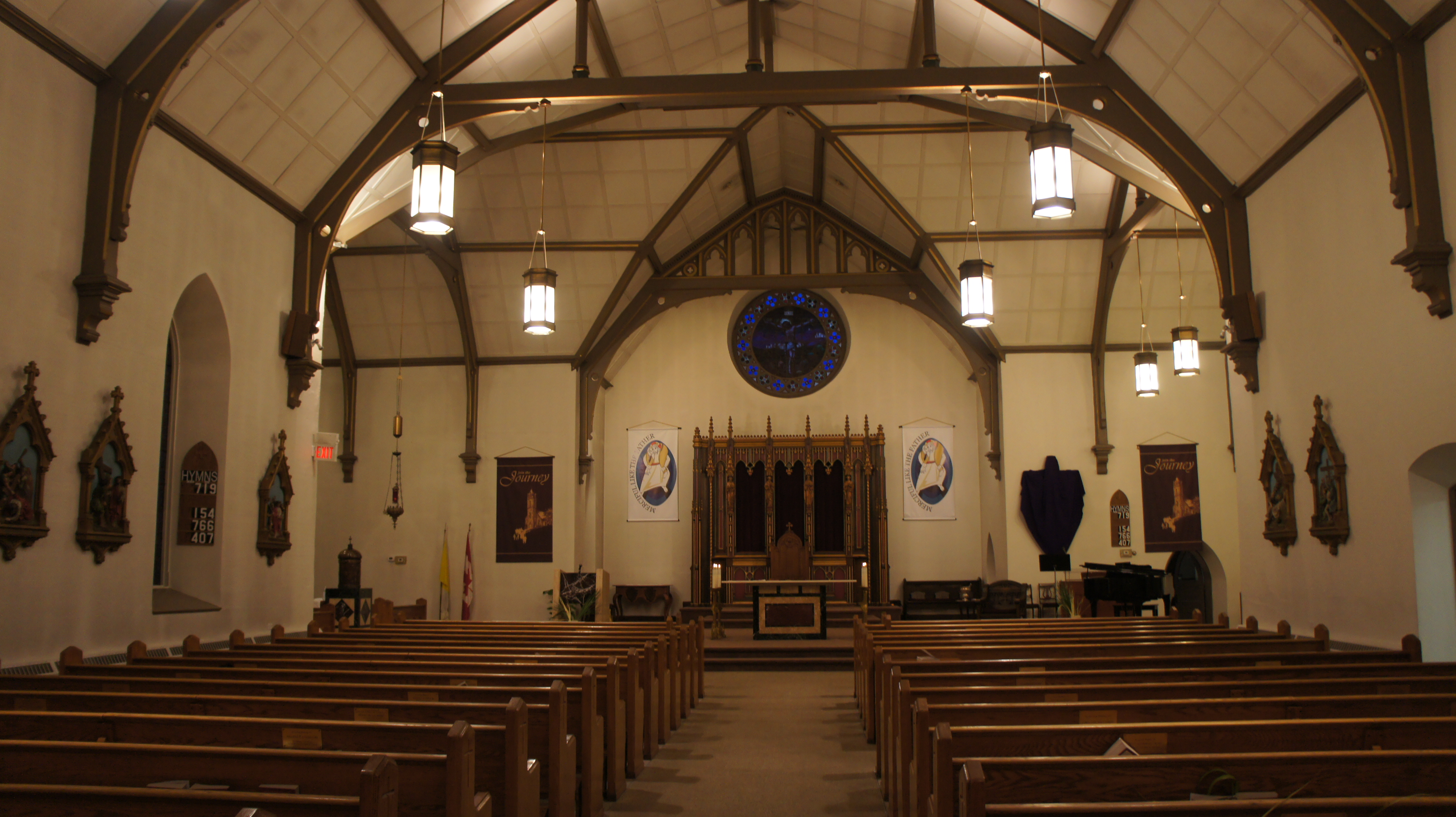
Precious Blood Cathedral - Interior

The first Catholic missionaries arrived in the area in around 1815, at which point Sault was an outpost of the Northwest Company. The Catholic parish in the adjoining city of Sault Ste. Marie, Michigan served Catholics for several years until a wooden church was constructed for the Parish of the Sacred Heart in 1846. In 1875, the present church building opened, as the region's Catholic population, mainly of French Canadian and Irish immigrant origin, began to grow rapidly. Following the creation of the dioceses in 1904, this facility was elevated to cathedral status. In 1936, the parish assumed its current name.

The building was fully renovated in 1963. In 2013, the parish announced plans for a $4 million expansion to church grounds, which will include the construction of a 5,500 square foot multi-use hall that will be the home of the diocese's social ministry programs.
