= Villa Loyola =

Coordinates: 46.404527°N 81.009948°W

- Location in Ontario Villa Loyola (Canada)
- Location: 4951 Long Lake Road; Sudbury, Ontario; P3G 1K9
- Denomination: Roman Catholic
- Website: VillaLoyola.com

History
- Founded: 1962
- Founder: Society of Jesus
- Dedication: Ignatius of Loyola

Administration
- Province: Kingston
- Diocese: Sault Sainte Marie
- Deanery: Sudbury
- Parish: St Mathieu

Villa Loyola is a centre in Ignatian spirituality run by the Society of Jesus in Greater Sudbury, Ontario, Canada. It is the only Canadian French-speaking Jesuit centre outside of Quebec. As well serving as a retreat centre it is also an ecumenical and interfaith conference centre. It is situated on the shore of Long Lake off Municipal Road 80 to the south of Sudbury's urban core.

== History ==
=== Foundation ===
Since the restoration of the Society of Jesus in the early nineteenth-century, French-speaking Jesuits ministered to the Franco-Ontarian population of Sudbury. In the 1960s, the Jesuits had to change their ministries. The creation of Laurentian University in 1960 led to the French-speaking Jesuits in Sudbury to move away from higher education. They handed over Sacred Heart College to the newly created university. The parish that they founded in 1883, Sainte-Anne-des-Pins, was handed over to the diocese. The parish was a local French-speaking cultural centre.

=== Construction ===
Villa Loyola was built in 1962 by French-speaking Canadian Jesuits. It occupies an area of 12 acres on the southern shore of Long Lake. It was originally conceived as a retreat house. It offers courses and retreats in Ignatian spirituality based on the Spiritual Exercises of Ignatius of Loyola. Retreats are for a weekend, or a week, or for the full 30 days. It also offers training for prayer guides and spiritual accompaniment.

=== Renovation ===
In 1996, the centre was renovated and so that it can offer space for seminars and conferences as well as the original program of retreats. It is also a centre for ecumenism and interfaith dialogue.

== See also ==
- Ignatian spirituality
- List of Jesuit sites
