= Marcel Gervais =

Canadian Catholic prelate (1931–2023)

The Most Reverend Marcel Gervais
- Archbishop Emeritus of Ottawa
- Installed: 27 September 1989
- Term ended: 14 May 2007
- Predecessor: Joseph-Aurèle Plourde
- Successor: Terrence Thomas Prendergast
- Previous posts: Auxiliary Bishop of London and Titular Bishop of Rossmarkaeum (1980–1985); Bishop of Sault Sainte Marie (1985–1989)

Orders
- Ordination: 31 May 1958
- Consecration: 11 June 1980 by John Michael Sherlock

Personal details
- Born: Marcel André Joseph Gervais; 21 September 1931 Elie, Manitoba, Canada
- Died: 6 August 2023 (aged 91) Ottawa, Ontario, Canada

Marcel André Joseph Gervais (21 September 1931 – 6 August 2023) was a Canadian Roman Catholic prelate. He was auxiliary bishop of London from 1980 to 1985, bishop of Sault Sainte Marie, Ontario, from 1985 to 1989, and archbishop of Ottawa-Cornwall from 1989 to 2007.

Gervais died on 6 August 2023, at the age of 91.

Catholic Church titles
Preceded by Joseph-Aurèle Plourde	Archbishop of Ottawa; 1989–2007	Succeeded by Terrence Thomas Prendergast
Preceded by Alexander Carter	Bishop of Sault Sainte Marie; 1985–1989	Succeeded by Jean-Louis Plouffe
Preceded by —	Auxiliary Bishop of London; 1980–1985	Succeeded by —
Preceded by Louis-de-Gonzague Langevin	Titular Bishop of Rossmarkaeum; 1980–1985	Succeeded by Donald William Wuerl
