= Pro-Cathedral of the Assumption =

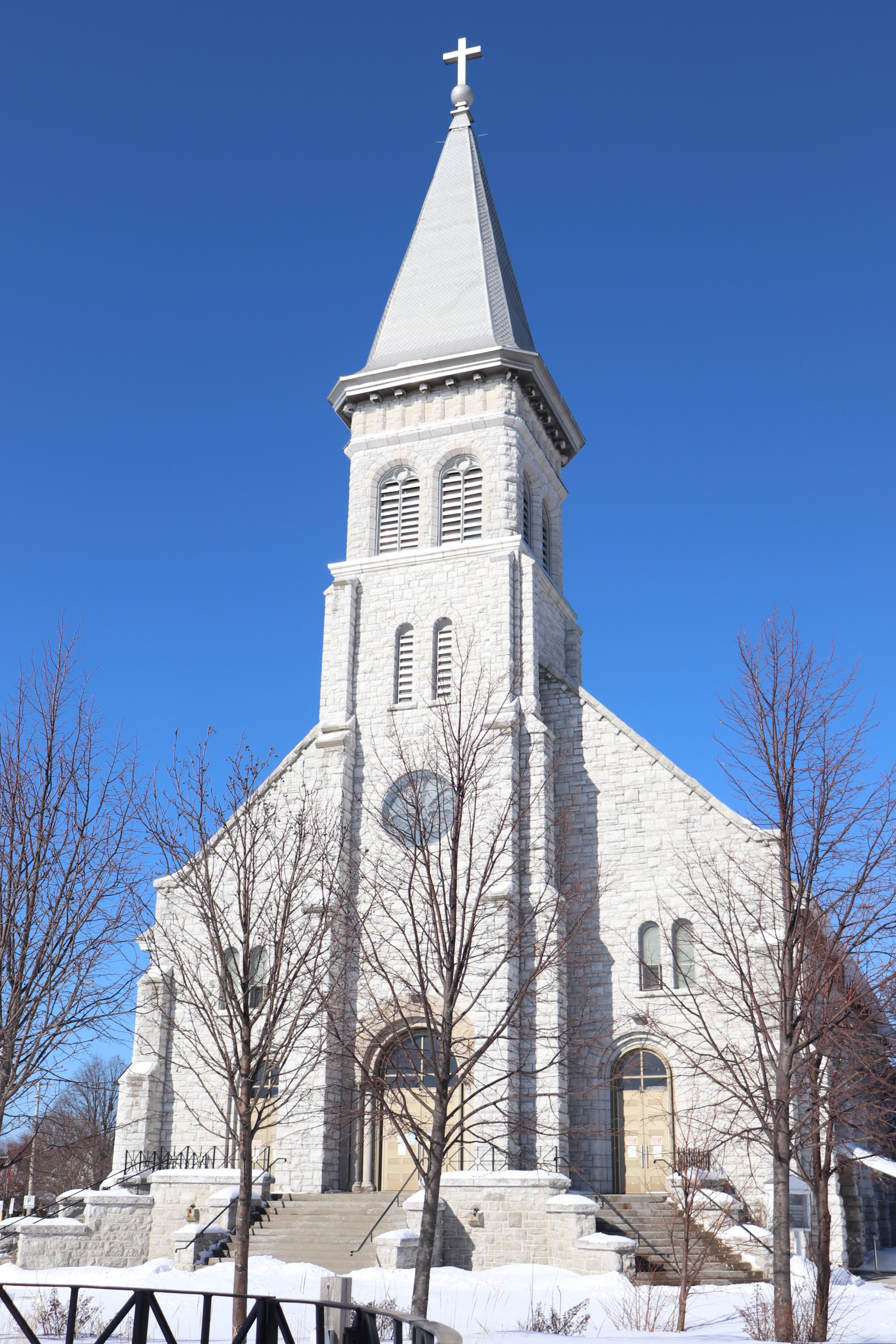
- Southern façade of the Pro-Cathedral seen from Algonquin Avenue
- Pro-Cathedral of the Assumption
- 46°18′56″N 79°27′59″W
- Location: 480 McIntyre Street West, North Bay, Ontario P1B 2Z4
- Denomination: Roman Catholic
- Website: Pro-Cathedral of the Assumption

History
- Former name: Saint Mary's of the Lake
- Status: Parish
- Dedication: Mary

Architecture
- Functional status: Active
- Architect(s): Thomson and Angus Architects
- Style: Roman basilica
- Groundbreaking: 1904
- Completed: 1905
- Construction cost: $65,000

Specifications
- Materials: White Limestone, from quarry in Orillia, Ontario

Administration
- Diocese: Diocese of Sault Ste. Marie

Clergy
- Pastor: Rev. Larry Rymes

The Pro-cathedral of the Assumption ('Pro' meaning 'in place of') is a historical Catholic church in the city of North Bay, Ontario. The white limestone building, built in 1905, speaks to the history of the city as well as a strong faith community that came together to construct a building of impressive scale and craft for the small city in Northern Ontario. The tall church is a landmark, holding a central role as a gathering place, not only for the city, but also for the entire diocese of Sault Ste. Marie.

== History ==
=== St. Mary's of the Lake Parish ===
The first physical church of North Bay can be dated back to 1886, when a small white chapel was built on Main Street West. The new chapel, known as St. Mary's of the Lake, quickly became a central point for the community. The bell was used as a fire alarm as well as a gathering call for important town meetings, while the upper part of the sacristy doubled as a school room. Due to an influx in population caused by the expansion of the Canadian Pacific Railway, St. Mary's of the Lake quickly became inadequate for the growing community.

=== New church ===
The arrival of a new pastor, Father David Joseph Scollard, in 1896, was the catalyst needed for the expansion of the parish. Two years after arriving in North Bay, Father Scollard bought the land that is now the site of the Pro-cathedral. Despite suggestions from parishioners to build the new church up the hill, away from the downtown, Father Scollard saw the downfalls of disconnecting from the center of the community as well as the additional costs that would be required to haul materials up the hill.

In the spring of 1903, during a meeting with the bishop, priest, and men of the congregation, plans to build a new stone church were finalized. The following day, the bishop and Father Scollard met with Harry Angus of Thomson and Angus Architects, and asked him to create plans for a new church that would be able to seat a total of 900 people. In early 1904 the contract for the entire project was given to Isaiah Taillefer of Taillefer and Sons, a contracting company from Sault Ste. Marie. Out of thirteen bids, they offered one of the lowest prices and promised to finish the project quickly.

=== Construction ===
Only a year and a half after construction began, the new St. Mary's of the Lake was completed, an impressive feat that reflected the skillful craftsmanship of the project. Only days before Christmas, on the last Sunday of Advent, December 17, 1905, the new church was blessed and dedicated. Catholics and Protestants came from all over North Bay and the surrounding area, filling the 1100 seats of the building. The final cost was $65,000, including heating, lighting, pews, altars, stained glass windows, and a large sacristy.

=== New name ===
During the same year that construction began on the new church, the northern part of the Diocese of Peterborough, in which North Bay resided, was sectioned into a new diocese, the Diocese of Sault Ste. Marie.

A cathedral is the central church of a diocese and considered the seat of a bishop. Sault Ste. Marie was chosen as the location of the cathedral for the new diocese, due to its geographical centrality. However, the bishop chose to reside in North Bay instead. This was for practical reasons, such as the accessibility that the railway provided to the rest of the diocese, but also due to a personal connection to the new church that had yet to be completed. From this point on, North Bay became the unofficial Episcopal See for the Diocese of Sault Ste. Marie, even resulting in discussions to make it official in 1932. However, the motion was defeated due to the funding the change would require. Not long after, this unofficial importance was realized in a change in name; St. Mary's of the Lake was now the Pro-Cathedral of the Assumption, with 'Pro' meaning 'in place of'.

== Community involvement ==
The generosity and sacrifices of the faith community were vital to the completion of the Pro-cathedral. From the beginning, committees worked alongside the clergymen who dedicated their time toward the project. In 1903, during the same meeting that finalized plans to construct the new church, it was agreed that the congregation would assume responsibility for much of the finances. Upon completion, over $30,000 of the $65,000 needed for the project had been collected from the Catholics of North Bay.

== Architecture ==
=== Style, site, and stone ===
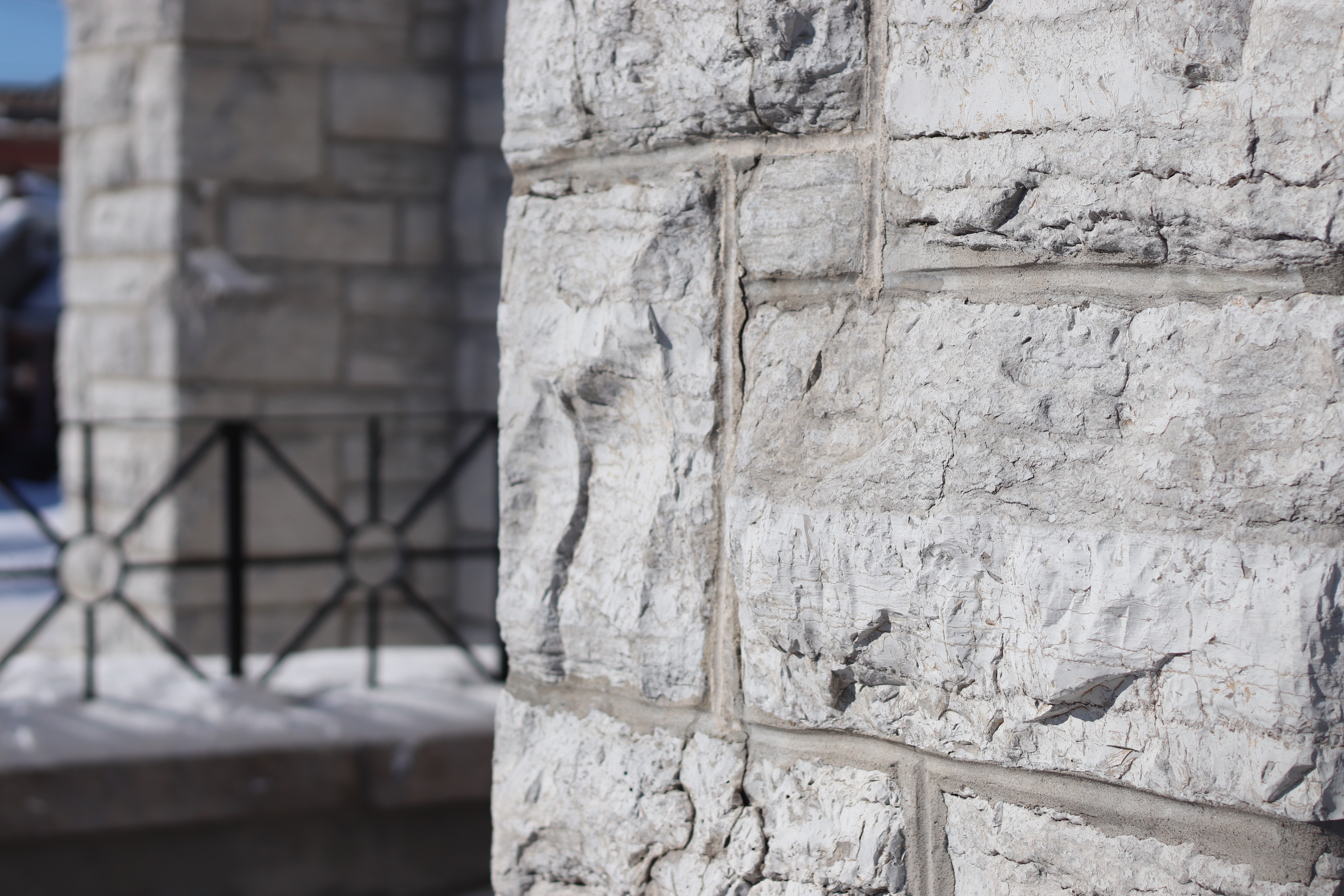
White limestone façade on Southern face of building.

The Pro-cathedral is built in the Roman basilica form, a style that was historically created as a place for public gatherings. Rectangular in shape, the building stretches longitudinally across the site from South to North, including a grand entrance, a long nave, and apse. The building sits on iron rod piles of great lengths to combat the weight of the building as well the layers of quicksand and thin hardpan that run underneath. The foundation is made out of North Bay granite stone, the same material that was considered for the superstructure, but proved to be too costly. Instead, white limestone was imported from a quarry in Orillia, Ontario and John Robertson of North Bay was hired to oversee the stonework.

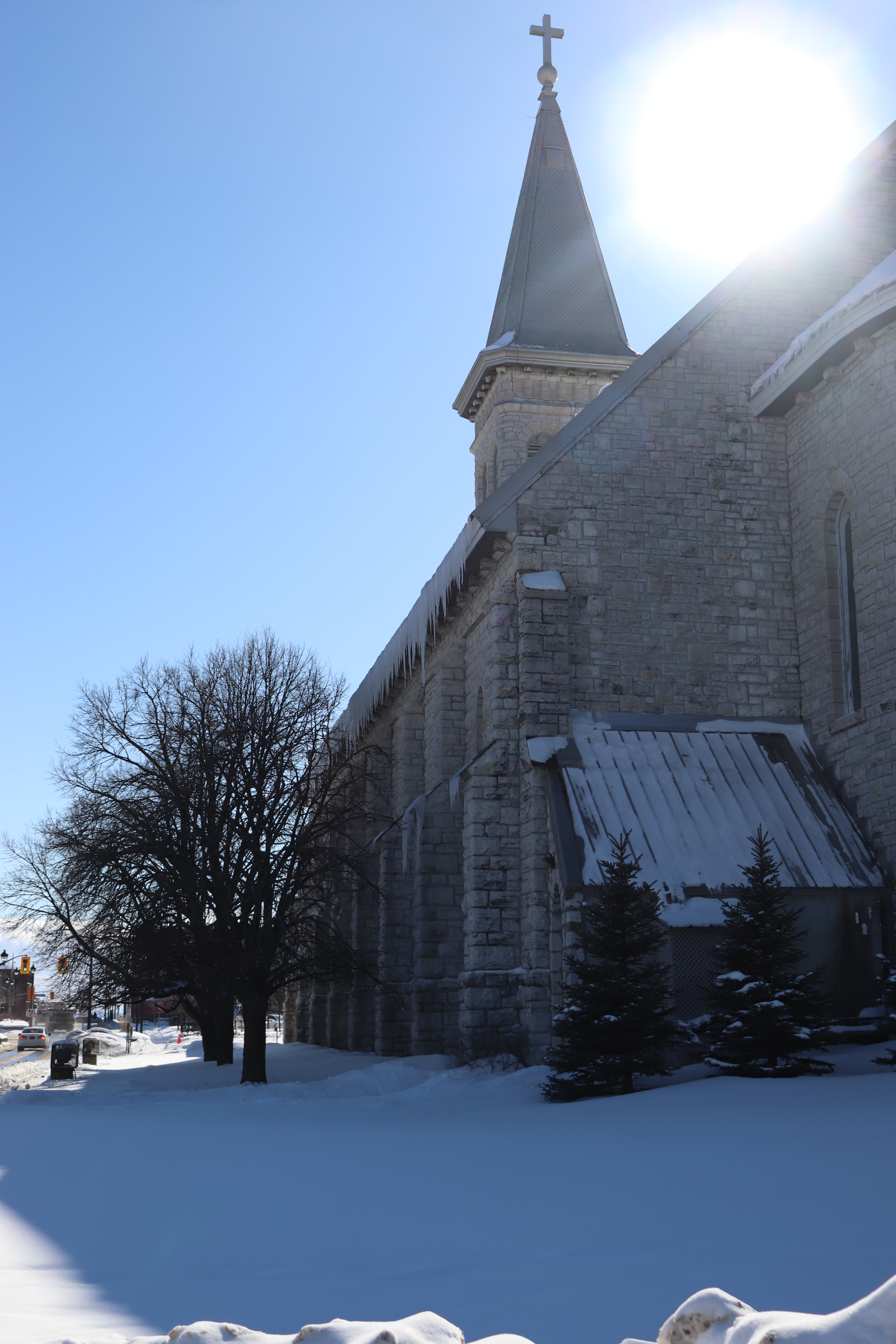
View of steeple from Algonquin Avenue.

=== Steeple and stained-glass Windows ===
As cathedral architecture normally dictates two steeples, the single tower of the pro-cathedral, which is approximately 146 feet in height, is a unique feature. In the 1980s, the steeple underwent major repairs along with the roof and cross. This included repointing the tower, bracing the steeple, and repairing the rose window. The cross was completely restructured and was lifted by helicopter to the top of the steeple adding an additional 20 feet to the total height.

Like the steeple, the stained glass windows have been carefully preserved over the past century. A strong connection exists between these windows and the driven congregation that helped to build the church. Eight windows were gifts from parishioners themselves, including Isaiah Taillefer, the general contractor for the project. The most recent renovation of the Pro-cathedral strove to embrace their beauty and importance, uncovering windows over the apse and accenting them with wood sills.

== Renovations ==
=== Ornamentation ===
Today, the interior of the pro-cathedral bears a close similarity to how it originally appeared in 1905, with dark carved wood panels and pews contrasting to the white plaster on the walls and ceilings. However, when repairs to the plastering were needed in 1923, the church took this as an opportunity to enhance their beloved building, resulting in a $30,000 renovation.

As part of the changes, the entire Cathedral was decorated by the Rambush Company Artist of New York. The walls and ceilings were ornately painted and a marble altar, Baldacchino, and drapery were added to the sanctuary. Other additions included new capitals on the columns and new electric light fixtures and wiring. The interior stayed this way for the next 40 years.

=== Vatican II ===
The 1960s were a significant time for the pro-cathedral community but also for Catholics across the globe. Vatican II, a meeting called by Pope John XXIII, was a controversial ecumenical council that restructured Catholic theology, pushing for greater conservative expression and a renewal of purity. In the spirit of this renewal, the Pro-Cathedral underwent a major renovation in 1967, during which the decorated interior of the Pro-cathedral was covered up. The Byzantine murals on the walls and ceiling were painted over to become pure white, woodwork was removed, and the stained-glass windows in the apse were covered in drywall. The Baldacchino was also removed and the tabernacle was moved into an alcove to the left of the apse. This allowed for more laity participation as the priest was now able to face the congregation without turning his back to the tabernacle.

=== Restoration ===
In 2001, the Cathedral again underwent major renovations and restorations. Many felt that the new interior lacked the warmth and harmony of the old Cathedral. Architect Jean Philippe Larocque of North Bay, was hired to restore the cathedral and bring back what the community had lost.

The large carved oak panels. which sat in the apse in 1905, were returned to their original place and the stained glass windows that had been covered in the 1960s, were found to be intact under the drywall. New front doors, improved lighting and acoustics, as well as painted decorative touches were also added. The result was subtle, but with a clear acknowledgment towards what the community had loved about the old Cathedral.

== Gallery ==
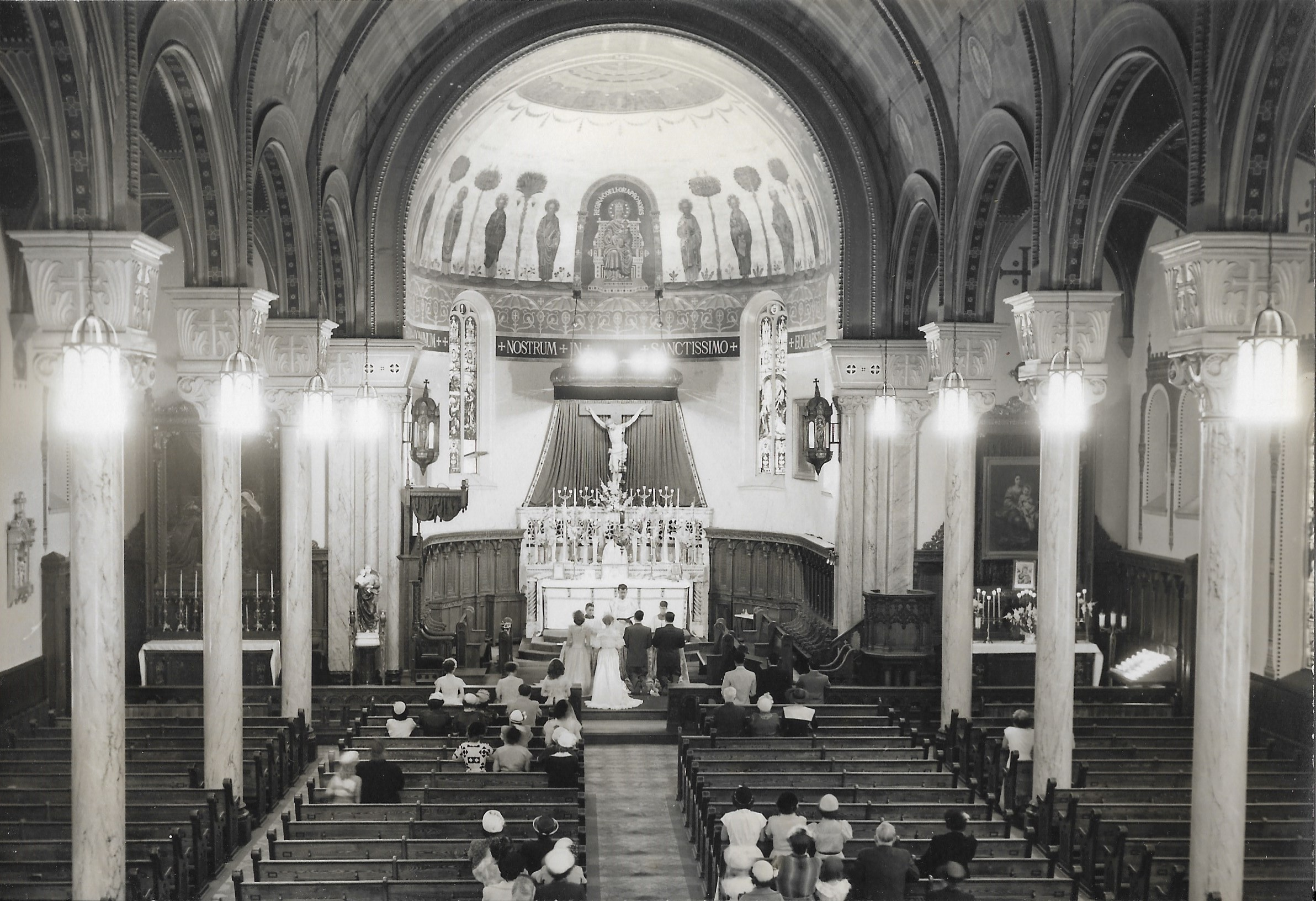
August 6, 1952 wedding photo shows the beautiful ornamentation on the walls and ceiling.

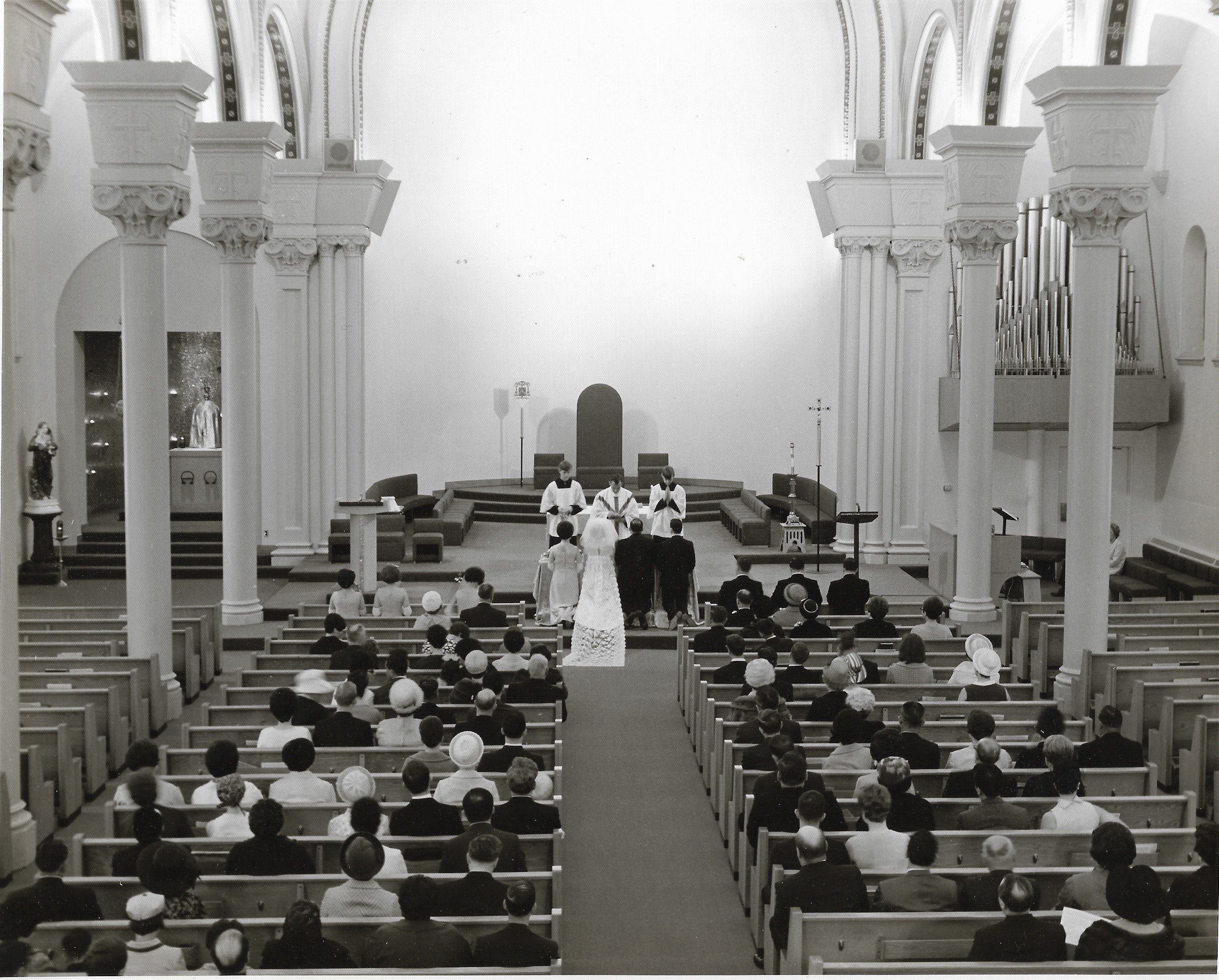
White plaster walls in 1968 wedding photo contrast to the previous ornamentation. Changes were made in the spirit of renewal inspired by Vatican II.

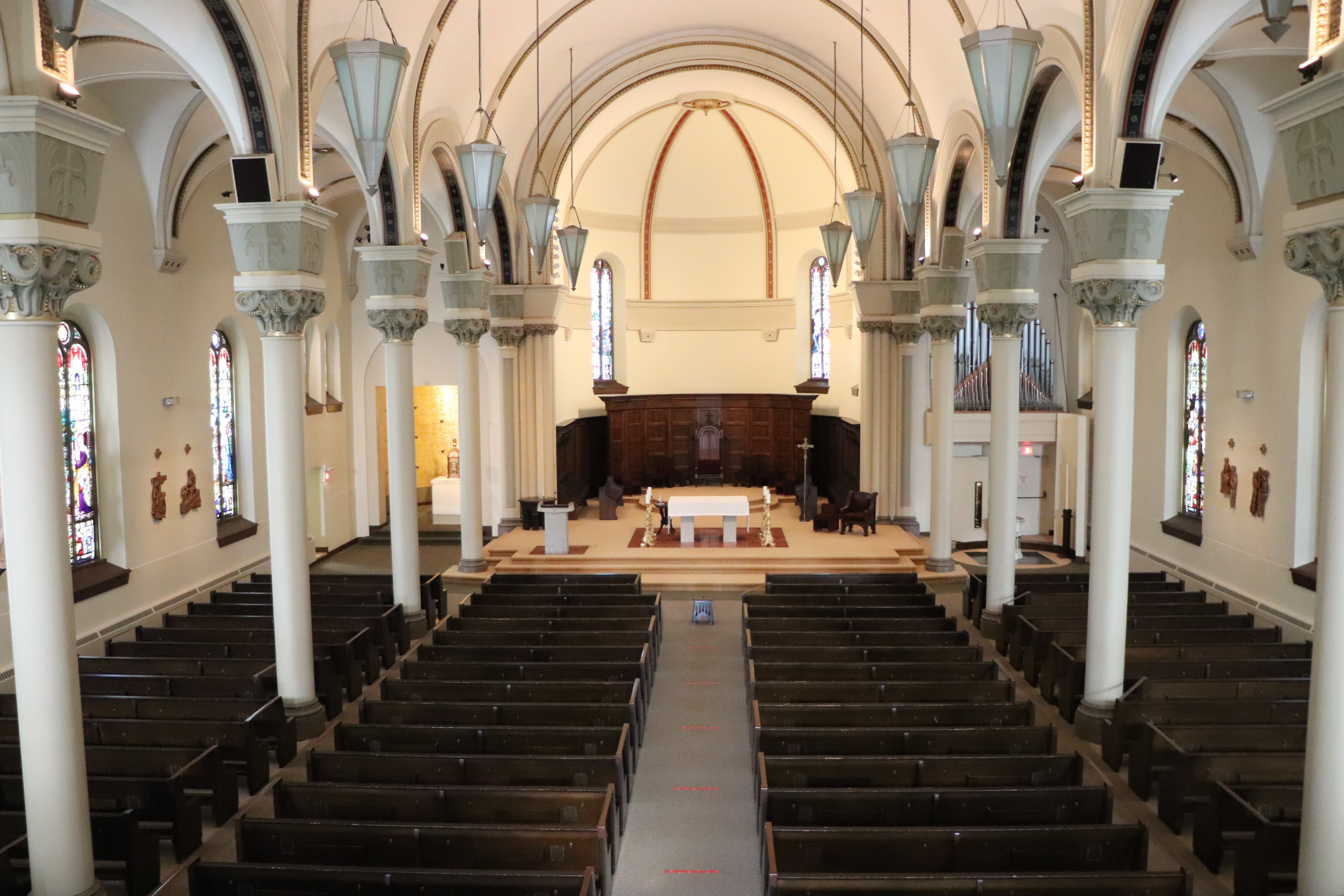
2021 interior of the Pro-Cathedral, with its restored oak panels and new lighting.

== 2001 Restoration Gallery ==
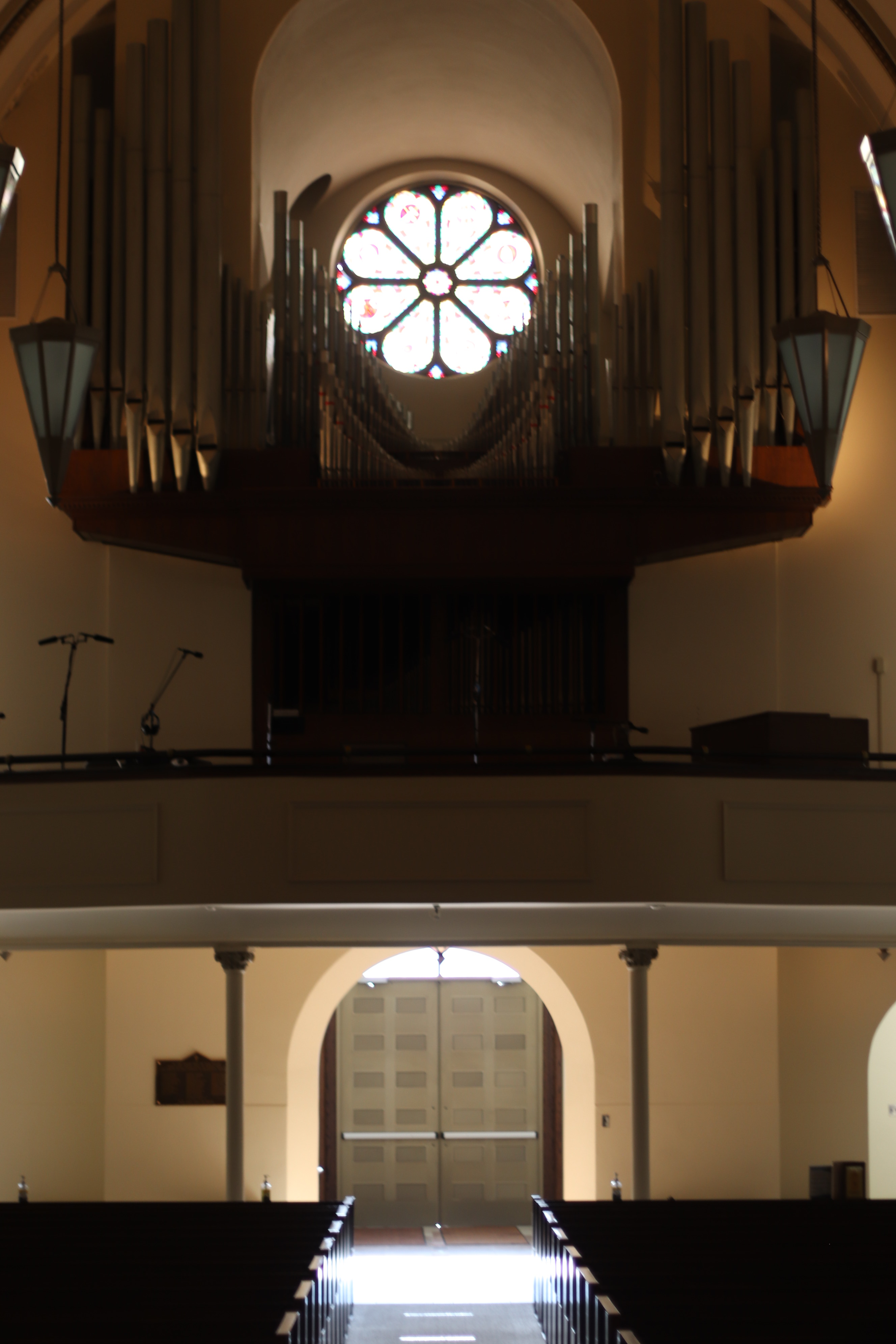
View down length of nave, with front entrance, organ, and rose window at end.

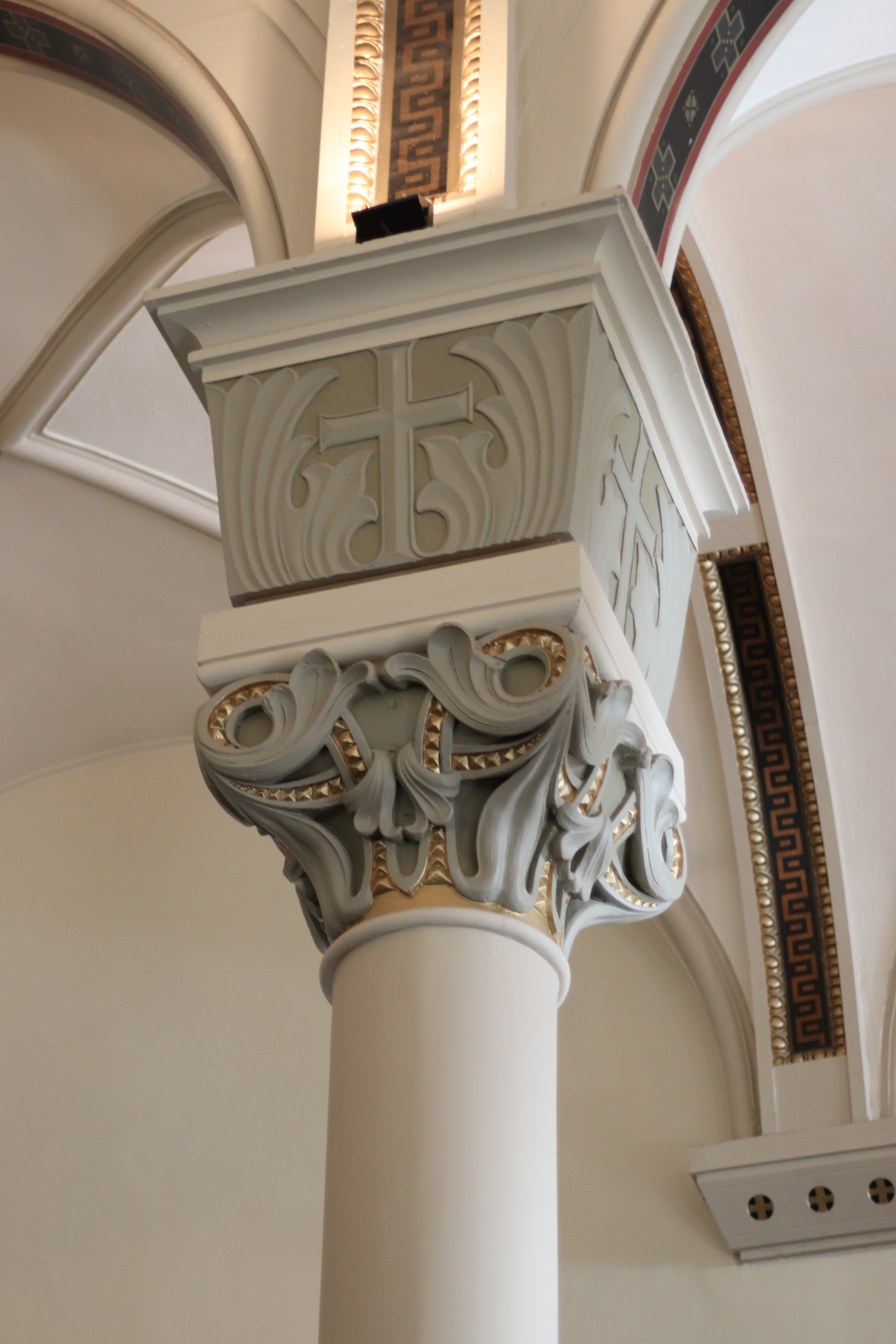
Capitals added in 1967 and painted in 2001 renovation.

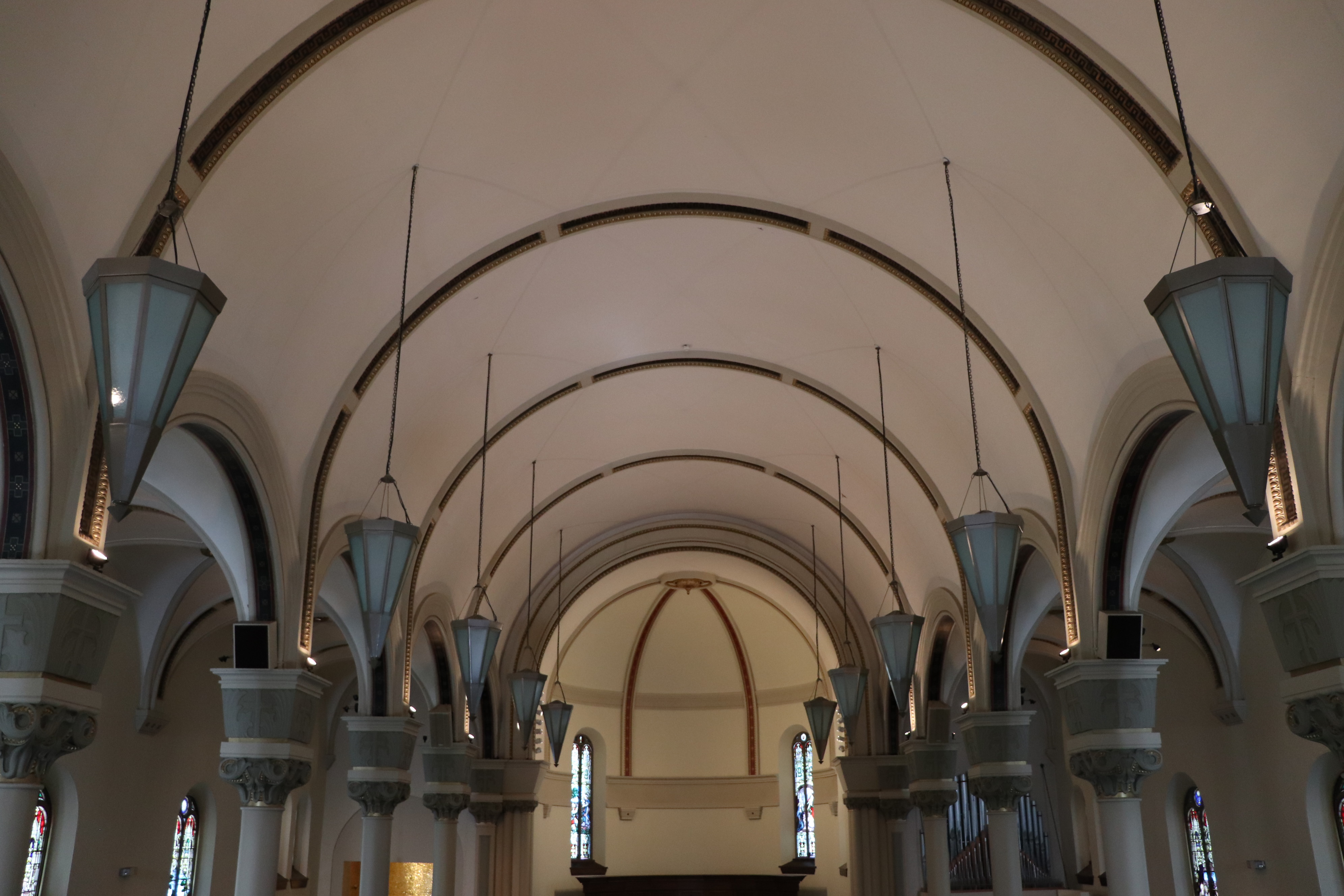
Ceiling of Pro-Cathedral showing new lights and decorative details added by architect Jean Philippe Larocque.

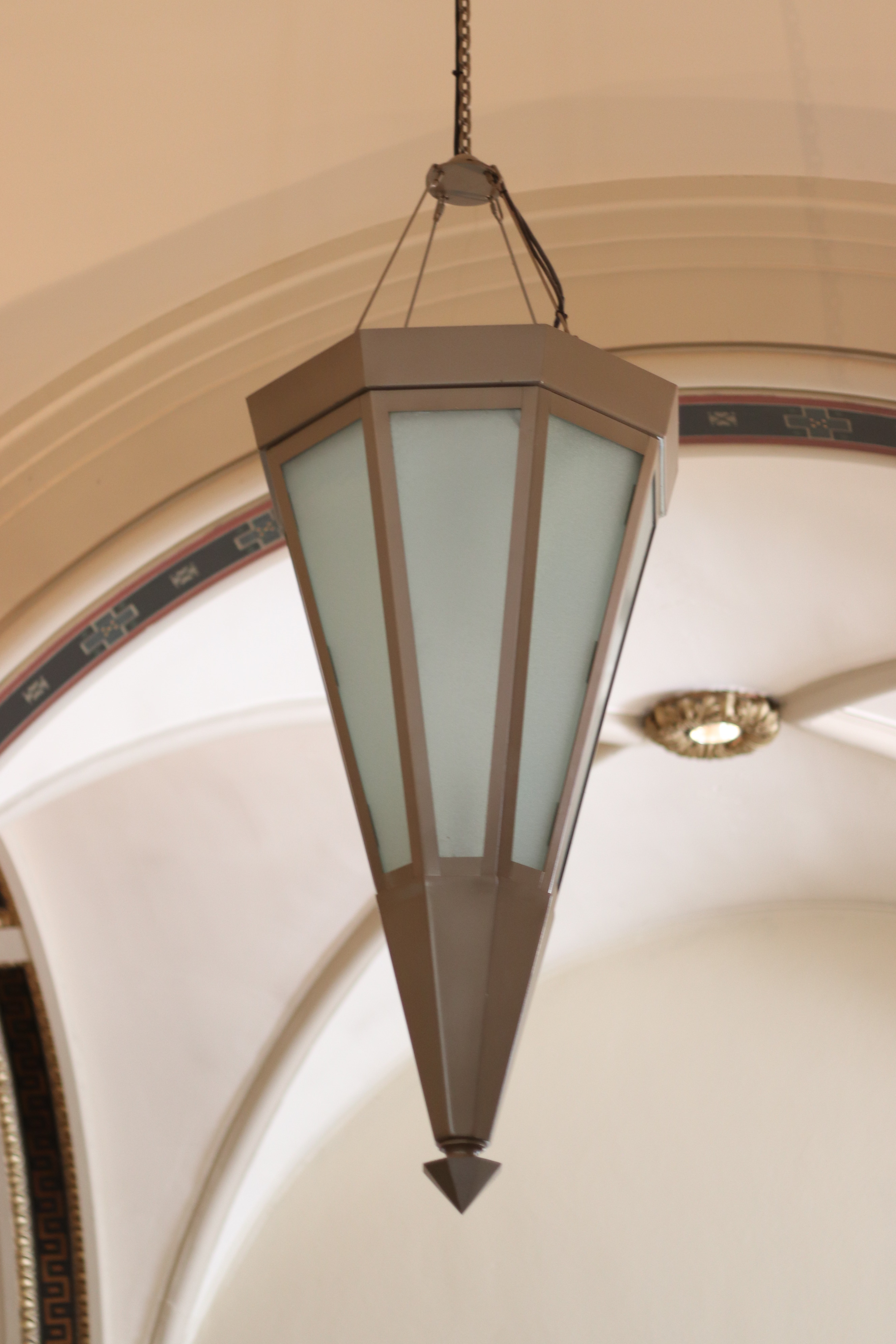
New lighting added in 2001 renovation by architect Jean Philippe Larocque.

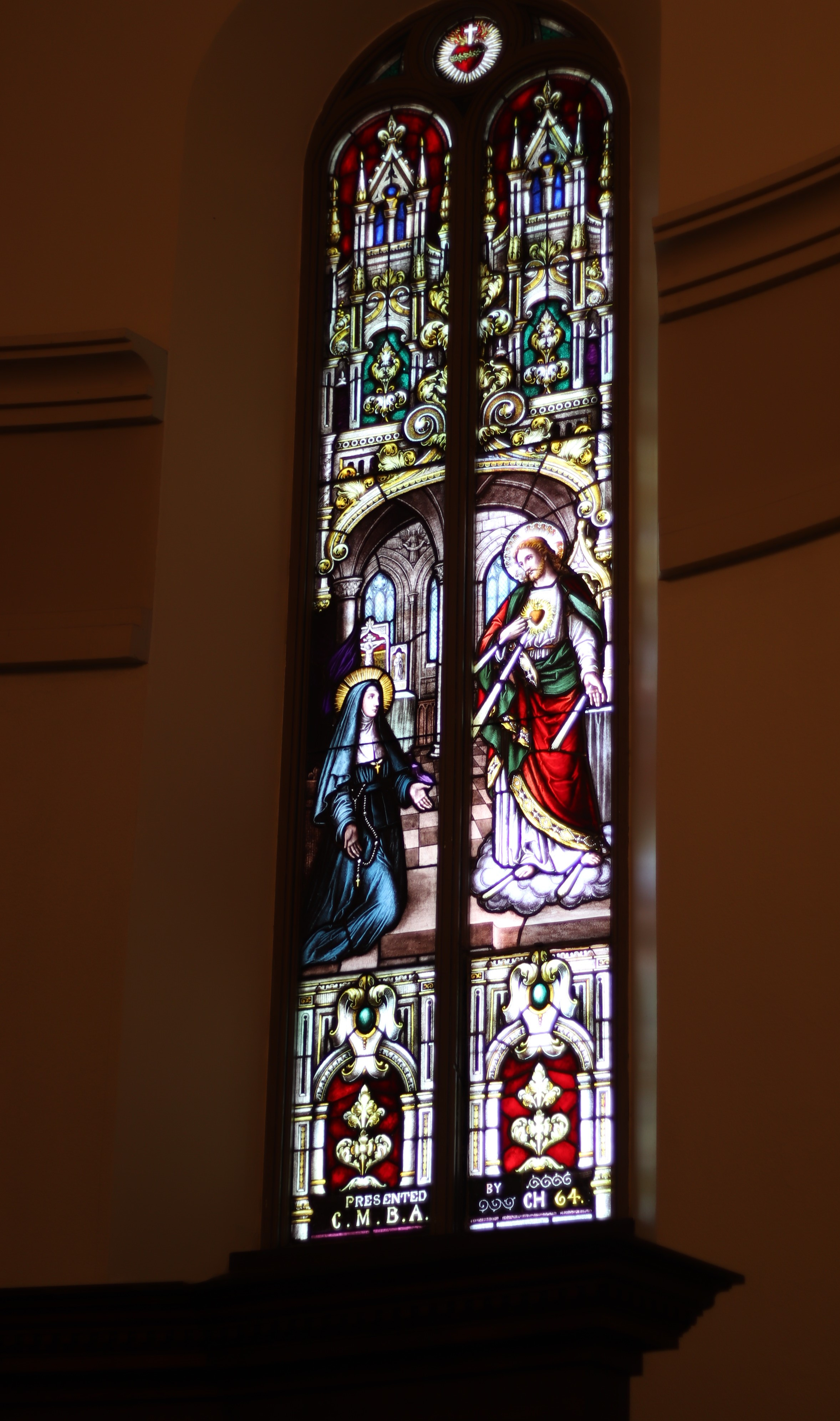
One of the two windows covered in the 1967 alterations and then uncovered again in 2001.
