= Sudbury Catholic District School Board =

School board in Ontario, Canada

Location
- 165 D'Youville St. Sudbury, Ontario; P3C 5E7 Canada
- Coordinates: 46.49679°N 80.99491°W

District information
- Chair of the board: Michael Bellmore
- Director of education: Joanne Bénard
- Schools: 17
- Budget: CA$64.3 million million (2006-2007)
- District ID: B29033

Other information
- Elected trustees: T. Peroni, J. Cameron, N. Deni, E. Scappatura, M. Bellmore, R. Desjardins
- Student trustees: J. Bates-Wright
- Website: www.scdsb.edu.on.ca www.sudburycatholicschools.ca

Sudbury Catholic District School Board (SCDSB, known as English-language Separate District School Board No. 32 prior to 1999) is a school board in north-central Ontario, Canada. The board is the school district administrator for English language Roman Catholic schools in Greater Sudbury and the southern Sudbury District.

It operates 19 elementary schools, four conventional secondary schools and an adult learning centre.

The Sudbury Catholic District School Board, along with the Basilian Fathers and the Roman Catholic Diocese of Sault Ste. Marie, was responsible for the operation of St. Charles College. The college was the site of many historical cases of sexual abuse. A notable case involved the abuse of a teenage boy named Rod McLeod, by Fr. William Hodgson Marshall, who was a teacher and sports educator at the college. The abuse dates back to the 1960s.

In 2012, four former students filed lawsuits against the SCDSB for the sexual abuse by Father William Hodgson Marshall.

== Elementary schools ==
- Holy Cross Elementary School, South End
- Holy Trinity Elementary School, New Sudbury
- Immaculate Conception Elementary School, Val Caron
- Pius XII Elementary School, Adamsdale
- St. Anne Elementary School, Hanmer
- St. Charles Elementary School, Chelmsford
- St. David Elementary School, Donovan
- St. Francis Elementary School, Gatchell
- St. James Elementary School, Lively
- St. John Elementary School, Garson
- St. Joseph Elementary School, Killarney
- St. Mark Elementary School, Markstay
- St. Paul Elementary School, Coniston

== Secondary schools ==
- Bishop Alexander Carter Catholic Secondary School, Hanmer — co-educational
- Marymount Academy, Downtown — all-girls
- St. Albert Adult Learning Centre, Downtown — adult high school
- St. Benedict Catholic Secondary School, — co-educational
- St. Charles College, New Sudbury — co-educational

== See also ==
- Education in Ontario
- List of school districts in Ontario
- List of secondary schools in Ontario
