= MusicFest Canada =

National music festival

- Logo used since 2010
- Status: Active
- Genre: Jazz
- Dates: 5 days in May
- Frequency: Annually
- Country: Canada
- Years active: 1972–present
- Founders: Robert Richmond; Gary Wadsworth; Paul Miner
- Attendance: 10,000
- Organizer: MusicFest Canada
- Website: musicfest.ca

MusicFest Canada, originally established as the Canadian Stage Band Festival (CSBF), is a national educational music festival in Canada. It was founded in 1972 by Robert Richmond (the founding president), Gary Wadsworth, and Paul Miner. The CSBF added vocal and concert band components in 1981 and 1985, respectively. The name was changed to MusicFest Canada in 1987, embracing the instrumental jazz, concert band and choral/vocal jazz divisions. In 2012, in partnership with the National Arts Centre, they added a 4th orchestra/strings division.

MusicFest Canada is an invitation-only event. Ensembles must earn an invitation by performing at an outstanding level at one of the 54 affiliated festivals from coast to coast. The average attendance at The Nationals is about 8,000.

Ensembles are adjudicated by noted Canadian and U.S. professionals in the jazz, band, orchestra and choral fields. Classifications are either by age (Jazz and Choral) or by an established level set by test piece (Concert Bands and Orchestras). Performing ensembles are ranked according to gold, silver, and bronze; awards and scholarships are also presented to individual musicians.

In addition, MusicFest hosts 6 national honour ensembles; the Jack Long Honour Band, the Woodshed Canadian Percussion Ensemble, the Thomastik-Infeld Canadian String Orchestra, the Ellison Canadian Concert Choir, the Conn-Selmer Centerstage Jazz Band, and the National Youth Jazz Combo.

== National finals ==
The Nationals are officially held in spring (usually 5 days in May) in a select Canadian city. Regional competitions are held in several Canadian cities during the preceding three months. Nearly 250,000 musicians participate annually in the preliminary events; some 8,000 (in more than 350 jazz and concert bands, orchestras, jazz combos, and choral groups) proceeded to the finals.

Activities at the national finals have also included clinics and concerts, the latter offered over the years by the Boss Brass, Gary Burton, Canadian Brass, the Humber College Faculty Band, Maynard Ferguson, and Woody Herman big bands, the Montreal Jubilation Gospel Choir, Oscar Peterson, Quazz, UZEB, the Swingle Singers, the Nathaniel Dett Chorale, Vertical Voices, Sixth Wave, the Eastman Wind Ensemble, Diana Krall, the New York Voices and others. The festival's closing concert of winning ensembles has been documented by TV specials produced for TVOntario, CBC Television and in 1976, 1977 and annually beginning in 1980, CTV.

=== Host cities ===
- Toronto (1973–1977, 1984, 1989, 1994, 1996, 1999, 2000, 2003, 2013, 2015, 2018, 2024, and 2025)
- Winnipeg (1978 and 1990)
- Vancouver (1979, at Expo 86, 1991, 1998, 2005, 2007, 2011, and 2014)
- Ottawa (1980, 1987, 1997, 2001, 2006, 2008, 2010, 2012, 2016, and 2019)
- Edmonton (1981 and 1993)
- Hamilton (1982)
- Calgary (1983, 1988, 1995, and 2002)
- Quebec City (1985)
- Halifax (1992)
- Montreal (2004)
- Markham (2009)
- Niagara Falls (2017, 2023, and 2026)

Additionally, the festival was hosted virtually in 2020, 2021, and 2022.

== Current executives ==
Jim Howard was appointed as the national co-ordinator in 1984 and the executive director in 1985. In 2016, Neil Yorke-Slader was appointed treasurer and associate director, and later executive director in 2024.

=== Board and officers ===
- Peter Grant, Chairman
- Colin Clarke, President
- Carmella Luvisotto, Vice-President
- Kevin Merkley, Secretary
- Bryan Stovell, Director
- Lynne Watt, Director
- Mark Hopkins, Director
- Andy Morris, Director
- Jim Howard, Executive director
- Neil Yorke-Slader, Treasurer and executive director

=== Ensemble leadership ===
- Sharon Fitzsimmins, Chair (Concert Band)
- John Chalmers, Chair (Choral/Vocal Jazz)
- Tony Leong, Chair (Orchestra/Strings)
- Kelsley Grant, Chair (Instrumental Jazz)
- Isabelle Brassard-Porter, Vice-Chair (Concert Band)
- Pratik Gandhi, Vice-Chair (Concert Band)
- Scott Leithead, Vice-Chair (Choral/Vocal Jazz)
- Frank Lee, Vice-Chair (Choral/Vocal Jazz)
- Shirantha Beddage, Vice-Chair (Instrumental Jazz)
- Marika Galea, Vice-Chair (Instrumental Jazz)
- Donnie Deacon, Vice-Chair (Orchestra/Strings)
- Marilyn Mann, Honour Ensembles Coordinator
- Darryl Ferguson, Co-Director (Canadian Honour Band Project)
- Mark Hopkins, Director
- Gillian MacKay, Director

== Former executives ==
=== Presidents ===
- Robert Richmond (1972–1984)
- John Nikel (1984–1986)
- Allen S. Michalek (1986–1996)
- Tom Glenn (1996–2005)
- Mark Wicken (2005–2018)
- Denny Christianson (2018–2021)
- Bryan Stovell (2021–2024)
