= St. Charles College (Sudbury) =

St Charles College (SCC)
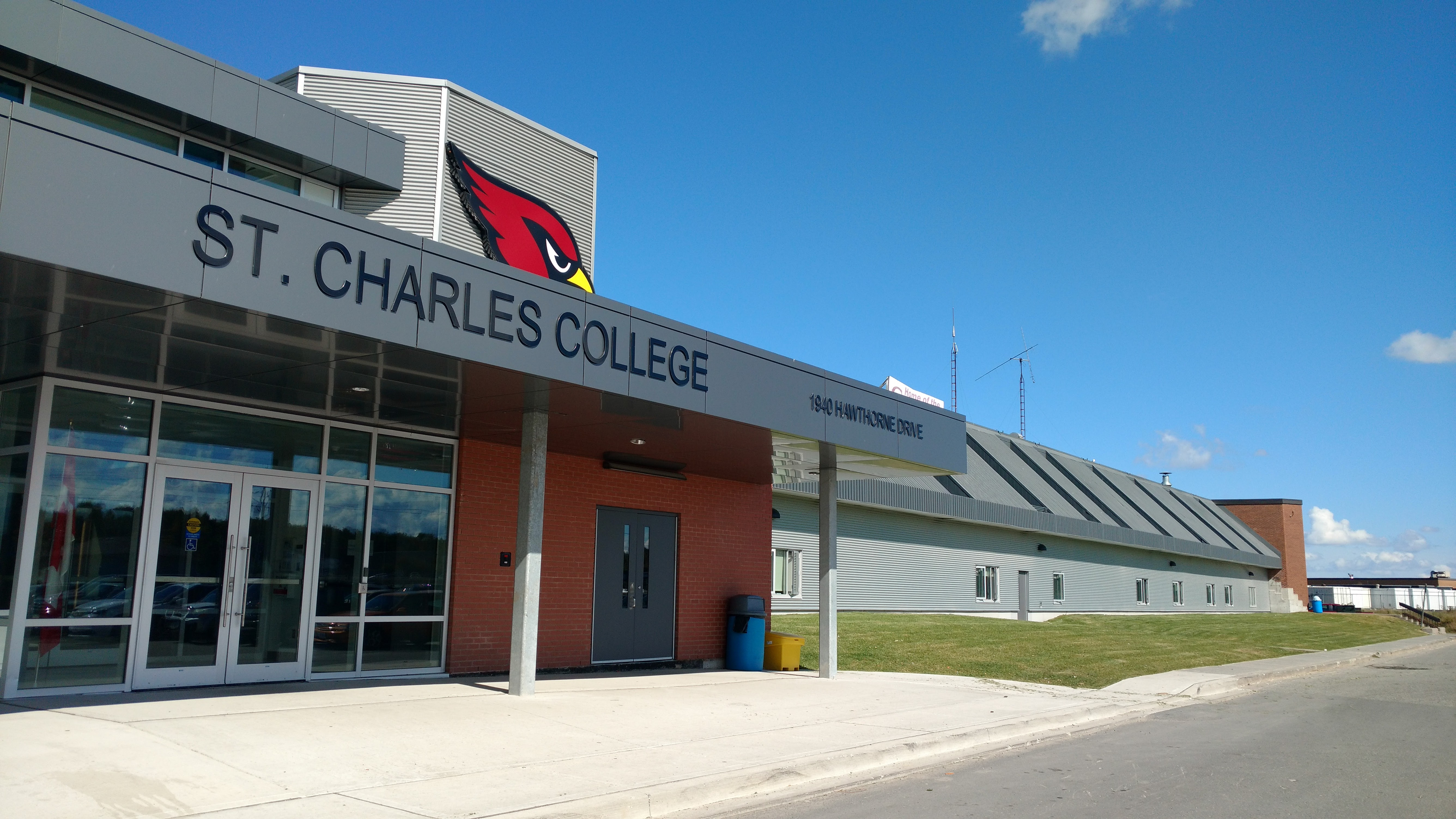
- The newly renovated main entrance and southeast wing

Location
- 1940 Hawthorne Drive; Greater Sudbury, Ontario, P3A 1M8; Canada

Information
- Funding type: Catholic high school
- Motto: Goodness, Discipline, Knowledge
- Religious affiliation: Catholic Church
- Established: 1951
- School board: Sudbury Catholic District School Board
- Principal: Lori Holden
- Grades: 7–12
- Colours: Maroon and black
- Mascot: Cardinal
- Team name: Cardinals
- Rivals: LaSalle Secondary
- Website: scc.sudburycatholicschools.ca

St. Charles College is a Catholic high school in Greater Sudbury, Ontario. Opened in 1951 as an all-boys school, St. Charles College has approximately 1,000 students as of 2024, from grades 7 to 12, and is part of the Sudbury Catholic District School Board. The school motto is "Goodness Discipline and Knowledge" and is based on the Basilian motto, Bonitatem et disciplinam et scientiam doce me, which comes from Psalm 119 of the Bible, - Teach me good judgement and knowledge: for I believe your commandments.

== History ==
St. Charles College was opened in conjunction with the Basilian Fathers of Toronto on September 5, 1951, as an all-boys school which was located at the former Children's Aid Society shelter at 258 Pine Street in downtown Sudbury.

By the 1980s, the number of students attending the school had started to outgrow the amount it was able to handle. In 1986, the school was temporarily moved to Garson in the building of the former Garson-Falconbridge Secondary School.

By 1993, the school had yet again outgrown the capacity of the school building, displayed by the 14 portables set up outside the building. Following negotiations with the school board which involved many other schools, the college moved to the building of the Nickel District Secondary School, also becoming a co-educational school in the process via a vote by board trustees on February 15, 1993.

In 2015, the school was expanded in the form of a new wing to accommodate grades 7 and 8 into St. Charles College.

== Controversies ==
On April 30, 2020, the Canadian Supreme Court rejected an appeal from the Basilian Fathers of Toronto to deny payment of nearly $2.5 million including $500,000 in punitive damages, to sex abuse victim Rod MacLeod. MacLeod, who was previously awarded this compensation by a jury in April 2018, was sexually abused by former St. Charles teacher Father William Hodgson Marshall. when he was a student at St. Charles in the 1960s. In 2011, Marshall pled guilty to committing abuse he committed in Sudbury and other Catholic high schools in Windsor and Toronto between 1952 and 1986. MacLeod's case was profiled in the 2019 documentary film Prey.

In late June 2022, a teacher from St. Charles College, Michael Zanier, 56, was charged with two counts each of sexual assault and sexual interference involving minors. Following further investigations, on August 25, the Greater Sudbury Police charged him with an additional five counts of sexual assault and five counts of sexual interference related to complaints of inappropriate behavior and touching involving students under the age of 16. The police indicated that there might be other survivors, urging them to come forward and report any incidents.

== Alumni ==
- Brian Ashton, former soccer player
- Brian Bigger, former mayor of Greater Sudbury
- Rob MacDonald, appeared on The Ultimate Fighter 2; retired professional mixed martial artist

== See also ==
- Education in Ontario
- List of secondary schools in Ontario
