= Thomas Dowd (bishop) =

Canadian Roman Catholic bishop

The Most Reverend Thomas Dowd
- Bishop of Sault Sainte Marie
- Province: Roman Catholic Archdiocese of Kingston, Canada
- Diocese: Roman Catholic Diocese of Sault Sainte Marie, Ontario
- Installed: 17 December 2020
- Predecessor: Marcel Damphousse
- Previous posts: Auxiliary Bishop of Montréal (2011–2020); Titular Bishop of Treba (2011–2020)

Orders
- Ordination: 7 December 2001
- Consecration: 10 September 2011

Personal details
- Born: 11 September 1970 (age 56) Lachine, Quebec, Canada
- Denomination: Roman Catholic
- Education: Concordia University (1992); Grand séminaire de Montréal; Lateran University (1997, 2000, 2002); Université de Montréal (2002)
- Motto: Cor et Anima Una; (One Heart and Soul)
- Coat of arms

Styles of Thomas Dowd
- Reference style: The Most Reverend (English); Monseigneur (French)
- Spoken style: Your Excellency (English); Monseigneur (French)
- Religious style: Bishop

Thomas Edward Dowd (born 11 September 1970) is a Canadian Catholic prelate who has served as Bishop of Sault Sainte Marie, Ontario since 2020. He was an auxiliary bishop in the Archdiocese of Montréal from 2011 until 2020.

== Early life and education ==
Born in Lachine, Quebec, Canada, Dowd studied at Concordia University in Montréal obtaining his Bachelor of Commerce degree in 1992. Being very active during his university school years helped Dowd prepare for a more public life; he was on 25 different committees and served as president of the Commerce and Administration Student Association as well as being on Concordia's Board of Governors and Senate, and was responsible for starting a scholarship program for commerce and administration students. Dowd graduated as class valedictorian, and was awarded the Concordia Medal and International Business Medal.

After leaving Concordia, Dowd started working for Ericsson Research Canada, eventually becoming manager of their Global Integration and Verification Organization. He remained with the company for 3 years until he left to become a priest.

Dowd studied at the Grand Séminaire de Montréal, which was affiliated with the Pontifical Lateran University in Rome, from which he received degrees in Philosophy, Theology and Divinity in 1997, 2000, and 2002 respectively. Dowd also received a Licentiate in Theology from the Université de Montréal in 2002. His licentiate thesis was on the topic of the relationship of jurisdiction between the Pope and the local Bishop.

Dowd was ordained a priest on 7 December 2001.

== Priesthood and Internet work ==
After his ordination, Dowd was assigned as an assistant pastor at the Montréal parishes of Holy Name of Jesus between 2001 and 2002 and Saint Thomas à Becket between 2002 and 2005. Between 2005 and 2006, He was the parish administrator of St. Veronica and assistant pastor of St. Luke. In 2005 until 2006, Dowd also served as the hospital chaplain for Lakeshore General Hospital in Pointe-Claire. From September 2006 until his episcopal ordination, Dowd worked as part of the diocesan curia as Associate Director for the Office of Pastoral Personnel, and as Director of the Diocesan Formation Services.

Having been in the technological market before his ordination, Dowd started a blog in 2003. Dowd was the first Canadian priest to have a blog. Also, Dowd was the person responsible for the Canadian Conference of Catholic Bishops online presence; the first Episcopal Conference to have a website. Dowd continues to use Facebook, Twitter, Reddit and his own personal website to reach out to members of the Church and the world.

Dowd taught theology at Concordia University starting in 2003. His last course at Concordia was in 2014 on the "Church in the World".

In 2004 Dowd contributed to the development of the fifth edition of the Ars Magica role playing game. He was credited in the core rule book for a design contribution as well as for being a play tester. He later received play test credit in other rule books, namely Calebais: the Broken Covenant, Realms of Power: The Divine, and Realms of Power: The Infernal

Dowd began studies in canon law in 2010, prior to being named a bishop. He continued those studies part-time while a bishop, eventually obtaining a Licentiate in Canon Law from the Institut de droit canonique (Université de Strasbourg) in 2018.

== Episcopal career ==
=== Auxiliary of Montréal ===
On 11 July 2011, Dowd was appointed an auxiliary bishop of the Archdiocese of Montréal by Pope Benedict XVI. Dowd was appointed alongside Christian Lépine. Dowd and Lépine were consecrated on 10 September 2011 by Cardinal Jean-Claude Turcotte, the then Archbishop of Montréal. At the time, he was the youngest Catholic bishop in Canada.

Dowd also serves as titular bishop of Treba, an ancient diocese in Trevi, Italy. In 2013, Dowd was appointed to the faculty of the Newman Institute of Catholic Studies. He was made an Honorary Senior Fellow of Renison University College in 2014 for his work in promoting Christian unity. He received the John F. Lemieux medal from Concordia University in 2018.

==== Investigation of Brian Boucher and aftermath ====
On 27 March 2019, it was reported that Dowd had played a key role in the investigation of Brian Boucher, a priest who was sentenced to 8 years in prison for sexually abusing two young boys. Through his investigation, Dowd discovered one of the two victims, who Dowd accompanied to the Montréal police. Dowd also turned over his 250-page report to assist in the police investigation. Justice Patricia Compagnone, who presided Boucher's trial, applauded the church's involvement. In a statement immediately after the sentencing on 25 March 2019, Dowd thanked the victims, the police, the crown prosecutor and the judge, and also condemned the actions of Brian Boucher. He also revealed that the investigation had led him to a time of depression and burnout, but pledged to strive to bring justice and healing should he encounter similar situations in the future. Dowd spoke about his own childhood experiences of abuse at a lay-run summer camp in subsequent interviews. The noted Vaticanologist John Allen offered some subsequent analysis of Dowd's work after being prompted to do so by an abuse victim.

On 3 April 2019, one of the victims of Brian Boucher (identified only as A.B. due to a publication ban) applied for authorization for a class action against the archdiocese of Montreal. On 20 June 2019, CBC Montreal published an investigative report: "Montreal sexual abuse victim says Catholic clergy interrogated him, looking for inconsistencies in his story." A.B. was asked by Dowd to attend a meeting in late 2016 concerning his experiences with Brian Boucher. According to the article, A.B. was grilled for several hours by 9 members of the clergy, some dressed in full church regalia, in the same place where he had been molested. The Archdiocese has not responded to the article, citing the legal proceedings already underway.

Dowd was part of a small group of bishops that attended a screening of the film Prey in September 2019, where he and the other bishops had a chance to talk with survivors of clergy sexual abuse. On 1 October 2019, he participated in the radio show Ottawa Morning with Robyn Bresnahan as a follow-up. On 16 November 2019, the Catholic Register published an opinion piece written by Dowd about the experiences of watching the film.

=== Bishop of Sault Sainte Marie ===
On 22 October 2020, he was appointed Bishop of Sault Sainte Marie, Ontario, Canada by Pope Francis. He was enthroned at the Pro-Cathedral of the Assumption, North Bay on 17 December 2020.
