= Alexander Carter =

Canadian Catholic bishop (1909–2002)

The Most Reverend Alexander Carter OC
- Bishop of Sault Sainte Marie
- Diocese: Sault Sainte Marie
- Installed: 1958
- Term ended: 1985
- Predecessor: Ralph Hubert Dignan
- Successor: Marcel André J. Gervais

Orders
- Ordination: June 6, 1936
- Consecration: February 2, 1957

Personal details
- Born: 16 April 1909 Montreal, Quebec, Canada
- Died: 17 February 2002 (aged 92) North Bay, Ontario, Canada

Alexander Carter OC (16 April 1909 – 17 February 2002) was a Canadian bishop, who served as head of the Roman Catholic Diocese of Sault Sainte Marie, Ontario from 1958 to 1985.

== Biography ==
Born in Montreal, Quebec, the brother of Cardinal Gerald Emmett Carter, he was ordained a priest in 1936. From 1958 to 1985, he was the bishop of Sault Sainte Marie. He was the chancellor of the University of Sudbury between 1960 and 1986. In 1989, he was made an Officer of the Order of Canada. He died at North Bay, Ontario.

In 1994, his memoir, Alex Carter: A Canadian Bishop's Memoirs (ISBN 0-9692787-5-6), was published.

Bishop Alexander Carter Catholic Secondary School in Hanmer, Ontario is named in his honour. St. Alexander's elementary school in North Bay, Ontario was also named after him.
