= Diocese of Sault Sainte Marie, Ontario =

Catholic ecclesiastical territory

Diocese of Sault Sainte Marie Dioecesis Sanctae Mariae Ormensis
- The Coat of Arms of the Roman Catholic Diocese of Sault Ste. Marie

Location
- Country: Canada
- Territory: Southern Thunder Bay, Algoma, Sudbury and Nipissing Districts, Ontario
- Ecclesiastical province: Archdiocese of Kingston
- Metropolitan: Northern Ontario
- Population: 230,000 (55.2%)

Information
- Denomination: Roman Catholic
- Rite: Roman Rite
- Established: September 16, 1904
- Cathedral: Precious Blood Cathedral, Sault Ste. Marie
- Co-cathedral: Pro-Cathedral of the Assumption, North Bay

Current leadership
- Pope: Leo XIV
- Bishop: Thomas Dowd
- Metropolitan Archbishop: Michael Mulhall Archbishop of Kingston
- Bishops emeritus: Jean-Louis Plouffe

Map

Website
- www.dioceseofsaultstemarie.org

The Diocese of Sault Sainte Marie, Ontario (French: Diocèse de Sault-Sainte-Marie, Latin: Dioecesis Sanctae Mariae Ormensis) was decreed on September 16, 1904 and is formed by the southern portions of the districts of Thunder Bay, Algoma, Sudbury and Nipissing.

The area has a long history within the Roman Catholic Church. The Recollets were the first missionaries in the Nipissing region around 1622. A number of Jesuits entered the area in 1641; Claude Pijart, being the leading missionary of that group. Their three missions were abandoned after a number of years, but Claude-Jean Allouez found converts still adhering to their faith in 1667.

In 1668 the mission of Sault Sainte Marie was founded by the Jesuits and used as a base for expeditions to adjacent areas. Priests who appear in historical accounts of the time include Gabriel Druillettes, Louis André, Henri Nouvel, and Pierre Bailloquet.

Little further expansion took place until about 1836 when Jean-Baptiste Proulx began an expansion which reached Fort William in 1849. Expansion after this point was rapid with hospitals and schools added to the parishes, churches and missions that marked this growth.

== History ==
The Diocese of Sault Ste. Marie was formally established by Pope Pius X on September 16, 1904 and four days later, on September 20, David Joseph Scollard, then pastor of Saint Mary on the Lake Parish in North Bay, Ontario was appointed its first bishop.

At this time the new diocese extended west from Callander, Ontario for 800 miles, reaching almost to the Manitoba border. The Catholic population of the new diocese in 1904 was approximately 34,000 with 64 parishes and 35 priests, of which only 7 were diocesan clergy.

During the episcopacy of the second bishop, Ralph Hubert Dignan (1935–1958), the western end of the Diocese of Sault Ste. Marie was separated on August 26, 1952 to form the Diocese of Port Arthur, now known as the Diocese of Thunder Bay.

Alexander Carter (1958–1985) was the third diocesan bishop, and was succeeded by Marcel Gervais (1985–1989), who subsequently became the Archbishop of Ottawa.

On January 12, 1990, Jean-Louis Plouffe was installed as the fifth Ordinary of the Diocese of Sault Ste. Marie.

On November 12, 2015, Marcel Damphousse was appointed as the sixth Bishop of Sault Ste. Marie. Jean-Louis Plouffe has retired and is now Emeritus Bishop of the Diocese.

On October 22, 2020, Thomas Dowd was appointed as the seventh Bishop of Sault Ste. Marie. He was formally installed as bishop on December 17, 2020 at 2:00pm EST at the Pro-Cathedral of the Assumption in North Bay, Ontario.

== Cathedrals ==
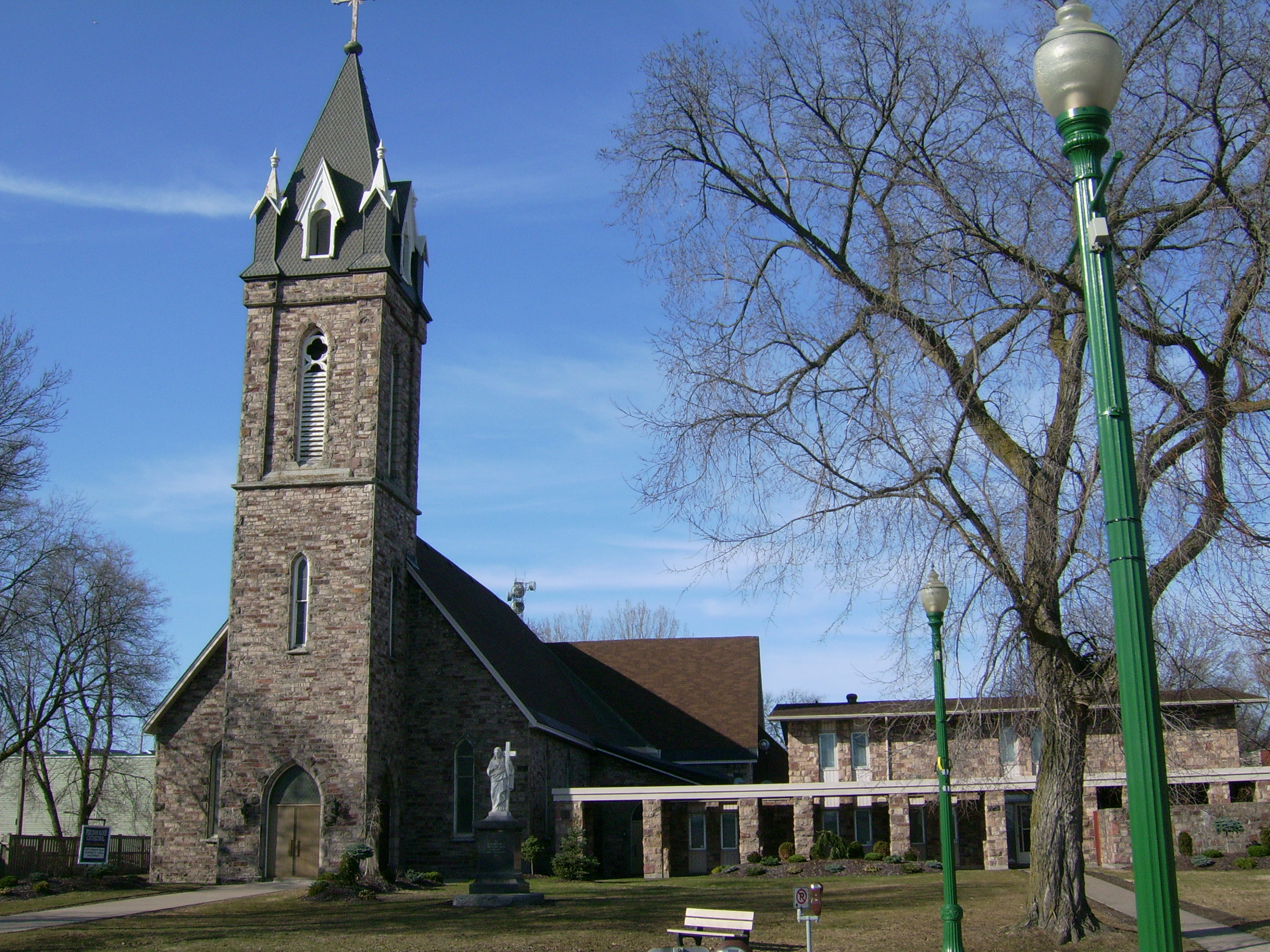
Precious Blood Cathedral

The official diocesan cathedral is the Precious Blood Cathedral in Sault Ste. Marie, although the Pro-Cathedral of the Assumption in North Bay serves as the bishop's parish. The diocese's administrative offices are located in Sudbury.

== Bishops ==
- David Joseph Scollard - September 20, 1904 - September 7, 1934
- Ralph Dignan - December 22, 1934 - November 22, 1958
- Alexander Carter - November 22, 1958 - May 3, 1985
- Marcel Gervais - May 3, 1985 - May 13, 1989 (appointed Coadjutor Archbishop of Ottawa, Ontario)
- Jean-Louis Plouffe - December 2, 1989 – January 13, 2016
- Marcel Damphousse - January 13, 2016 - May 6, 2020 (appointed Coadjutor Archbishop of Ottawa-Cornwall, Ontario)
- Thomas Dowd - December 17, 2020 - present

=== Coadjutor bishop ===
- Alexander Carter (1956–1958)

=== Auxiliary bishops ===
- Joseph Adolphe Proulx (1965–1967), appointed Bishop of Alexandria in Ontario
- Gérard Dionne (1975–1983), appointed Bishop of Edmundston, New Brunswick
- Bernard Francis Pappin (1975–1998)
- Jean-Louis Plouffe (1986–1989), appointed Bishop here
- Paul-André Durocher (1997–2002), appointed Bishop of Alexandria-Cornwall, Ontario (now Archbishop of Gatineau)
- Robert Harris (2002–2007), appointed Bishop of Saint John, New Brunswick
- Brian Joseph Dunn (2008–2009), appointed Bishop of Antigonish, Nova Scotia
- Noël Simard (2008–2011), appointed Bishop of Valleyfield, Québec

=== Other priest of this diocese who became bishop ===
- Robert Ovide Bourgon, appointed Bishop of Hearst, Ontario in 2016

== See also ==
- Anishinabe Spiritual Centre
- Villa Loyola
