= Alain Faubert =

Canadian bishop (born 1965)

The Most Reverend Alain Faubert
- Bishop of Valleyfield
- Church: Catholic Church
- Diocese: Diocese of Valleyfield
- Appointed: 12 September 2024
- Predecessor: Noël Simard
- Previous posts: Titular Bishop of Vicus Pacati (2016-2024); Auxiliary Bishop of Montreal (2016-2024)

Orders
- Ordination: 9 June 1995
- Consecration: 15 June 2016 by Christian Lépine

Personal details
- Born: 4 April 1965 (age 61) Montreal, Quebec, Dominion of Canada, British Empire
- Education: Institut Catholique de Paris and Université Laval
- Coat of arms

Alain Faubert (born 4 April 1965) is a Canadian bishop of the Catholic Church who has served as bishop of the Roman Catholic Diocese of Valleyfield since 2024 and previously as auxiliary bishop of the Archdiocese of Montreal from 2016 to 2024

Faubert is one of the Canadian bishop delegates at the General Assembly of the Synod on Synodality.

== Biography ==
Alain Faubert was born on 4 April 1965 in Montréal. He was raised in Laval and attended the Marist Brothers' Collège Laval where in September 1979 he had a religious experience that he later described as "an event, so bright, so full of life, I hardly remember what was going on before". He spent ten summers as a counselor at Camp Mariste in Rawdon that had outreach to poor youth as its mission, "to be with them, to listen to them, to care for them". His academic interests remained physics, computer science, and mathematics. At the age of 19 he entered engineering school, the École Polytechnique de Montréal, but inspired by the example of young priests at camp and their involvement in the Focolare Movement, he left school at 20 and joined a Marist mission to Haiti, devoting ten months to teaching languages, mathematics, and catechism. He returned to Montreal and after a brief return to science began his seminary studies in September 1987.

He studied at Collège Marie-Victorin and the Major Seminary of Montréal. He was ordained a priest for the Archdiocese of Montreal on 9 June 1995 in the Church of St. Pius X in Laval. After serving as parish vicar of Saint-Urbain and Sainte-Dorothée from 1995 to 2000, he studied theology at the Institut Catholique de Paris for three years. He returned to Saint-Germain d'Outremont in Montreal serving as vicar from 2003 and pastor from 2011 to 2014.

Alongside his parish work he earned his doctorate from Laval University in 2010 with the thesis: "'Tous', 'un', 'quelques-uns'. La présidence, expression de l’interdépandance entre pasteurs et Ecclesia". He also taught ecclesiology and the theology of ministries at the Institut de formation théologique de Montréal. His assignments for the Archdiocese included stints with the Office for Education from 2004 to 2008 and the post of vice moderator of the Curia from 2007 to 2010. Faubert also co-hosted the television magazine show “Parole et Vie” from 2004 to 2010, which explored contemporary spiritual and religious issues.

In January 2011 Cardinal Jean-Claude Turcotte, Archbishop of Montreal, appointed Faubert Episcopal Vicar of the eastern region of the Archdiocese of Montreal. He was honored with the title of Chaplain to His Holiness in May 2011. Turcotte's successor, Archbishop Christian Lépine, shortly after arriving in March 2012, implemented a reorganization that ended the regional vicarage system and sidelined Faubert.

Local observers were therefore surprised to see Faubert promoted to a more significant role a few years later, when Pope Francis appointed him titular bishop of Vicus Pacati and auxiliary bishop to Lépine in Montreal on 19 April 2016. One member of the archdiocesan priests' council viewed it as Rome's "disavowal" of Lépine's reorganization of the administration of the Archdiocese, which some priests had criticized in a letter to the apostolic nuncio to Canada. He thought the Archdiocese was in a critical state and needed Faubert's communication skills. A former vicar general praised Faubert's nomination for its potential to unify communities that feel distant from their bishop. A seminary teacher thought Faubert's expertise in ecclesiology suited Montreal's need to transform itself into a missionary church with greater lay responsibility.

Faubert received his episcopal consecration from Lépine on 15 June 2016 at Mary, Queen of the World Cathedral. The mayor of Montreal Denis Coderre attended and called Faubert "a breath of fresh air". In August Lépine named his two auxiliaries vicars general, giving Faubert responsibility "for co-ordinating all the pastoral and missionary activities carried out within the diocese", effective 1 September.

While an auxiliary, Faubert participated in the work of the Conseil Communautés et Ministères of the Assembly of Catholic Bishops of Quebec and the National Commission for Christian Unity, Religious Relations with the Jews, and Interreligious Dialogue of the Canadian Conference of Catholic Bishops. He became a member of the Francophone Episcopal Commission for Liturgy and Sacraments in 2023.

On 12 September 2024, Pope Francis appointed Alain Faubert as Bishop of Valleyfield. He was installed on 28 November.

Faubert was a delegate elected by the Canadian bishops to participate in the Synod on Synodality in October 2024. On 23 October 2024, the Synod of Bishops elected Faubert a member of the Ordinary Council of the General Secretariat of the Synod.

He has walked portions of the Camino to Santiago de Campostela on several occasions.
