= Church of the Gesù (Montreal) =

Coordinates: 45°30′19″N 73°33′59″W

- Église du Gesù
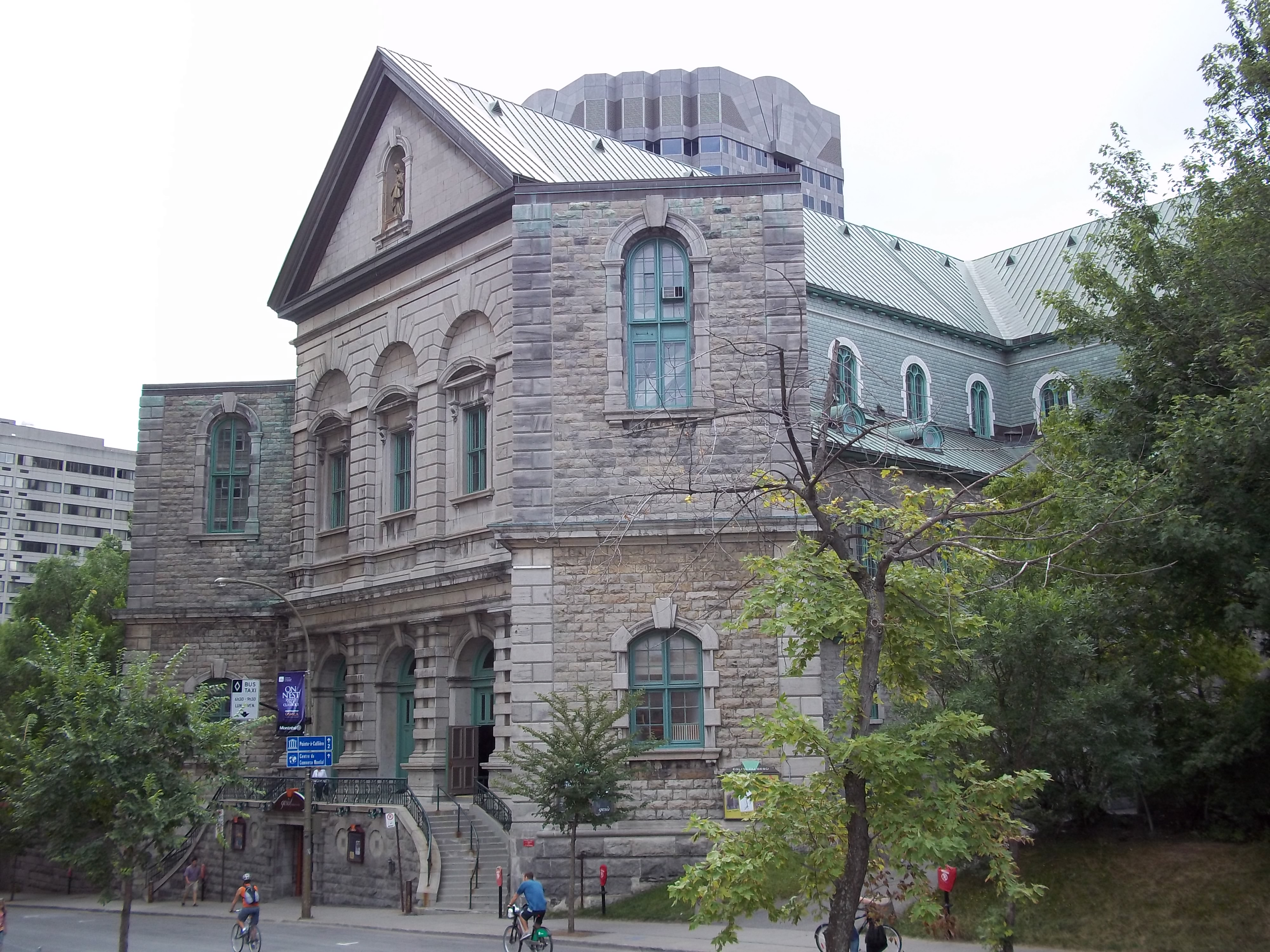
- Front entrance

- Location in Montreal
- Location: Montreal, Quebec, Canada
- Denomination: Roman Catholic Church

History
- Founder: Society of Jesus
- Dedication: Sacred Heart

Architecture
- Architect: Patrick Keely
- Style: Baroque Revival architecture
- Groundbreaking: 1864
- Completed: July 10, 1865

Administration
- Archdiocese: Archdiocese of Montreal

Clergy
- Archbishop: Christian Lépine

The Church of the Gesù (French: Église du Gesù) is a Catholic parish in downtown Montreal, Quebec, Canada. It is located at 1202 Bleury Street in the borough of Ville-Marie. Its basement doubles as a popular music venue.

== History ==
Ignace Bourget, the second bishop of Montreal, wanted the churches of his diocese to replicate the architecture of Roman churches. This was reflected in the design of Mary, Queen of the World Cathedral after St. Peter's Basilica in the Vatican City.

Similarly, the Church of the Gesù was based on the Church of the Gesù in Rome. Construction began in 1864, and the church opened on July 10, 1865. The Gesù witnessed the first "electric candle " lit in Canada in 1878.

The Jesuit-run Collège Sainte-Marie was built south of the church. It was demolished in 1975, but the Gesù was preserved and restored in 1983.

In this church, there is a statue of Notre-Dame-de-Liesse, brought from France in 1877, which contains the ashes of the original statue burned during the French Revolution.

The basement of the Gesù was converted into an auditorium and is one of the oldest cultural centers in Montreal. It has played an important role in Montreal's cultural life, welcoming both local and foreign actors, including the Compagnons de Saint-Laurent, under the direction of Father Émile Legault, and the Théâtre du Nouveau Monde.

== Architecture ==
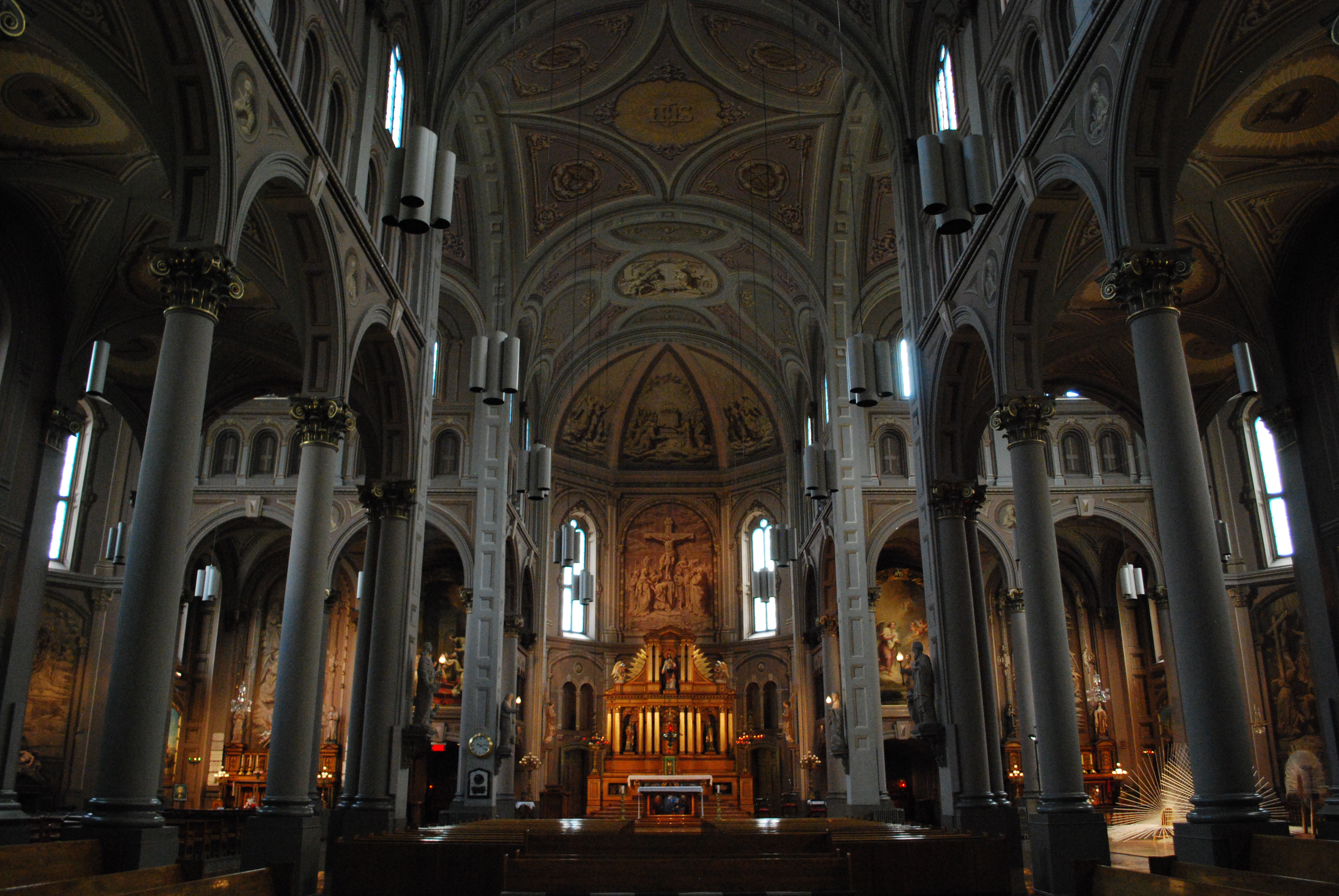
Interior of the Church of the Gesù.

Experienced Irish-American architect Patrick Keely developed plans that drew heavily on the Church of the Gesù in Rome, a grand Roman Baroque church in which Ignatius of Loyola, founder of the Society of Jesus, is buried. The Church of the Gesù in Montreal retained the Italian name of Jesus, found in its Roman counterpart.

The Gesù in Montreal is a not an exact replica of the Gesù in Rome. It is nevertheless a large church of about 4,400 square metres (47,000 sq ft) with a vault height of 22.9 metres (75 ft) above ground level. This is the only entirely baroque-style church in Montreal. The church was to be topped by two bell towers on either side of the entrance. The bases were constructed, although the towers were never completed for financial reasons. A large part of the funds raised for construction of the church were used instead to support the Collège Sainte-Marie.

The vault of the Gesù consists of five arches. It is adorned with frescoes by American painter Daniel Muller, who replicated work from the German school of Düsseldorf, depicting the life of Jesus.

== Gallery ==
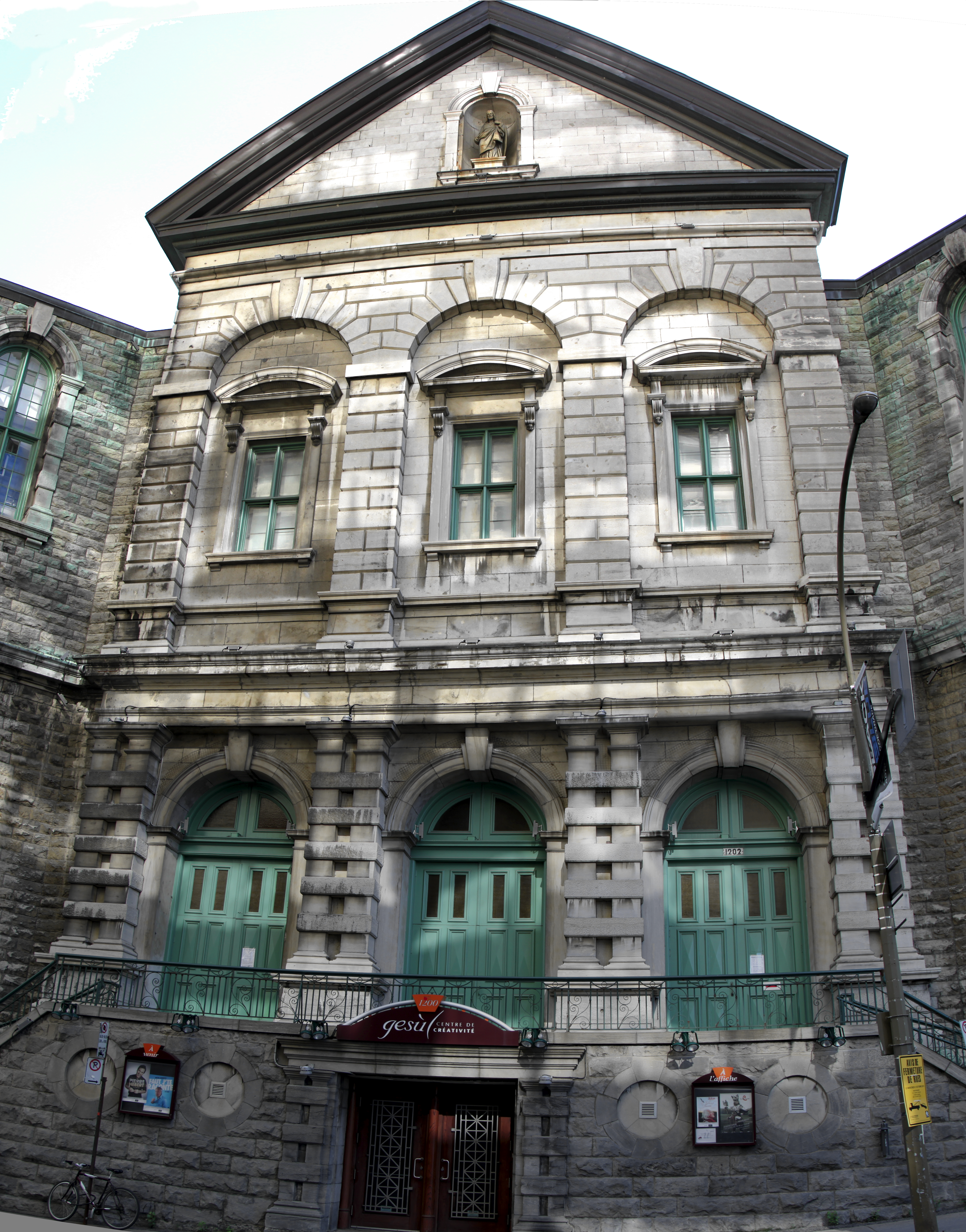
Entrance

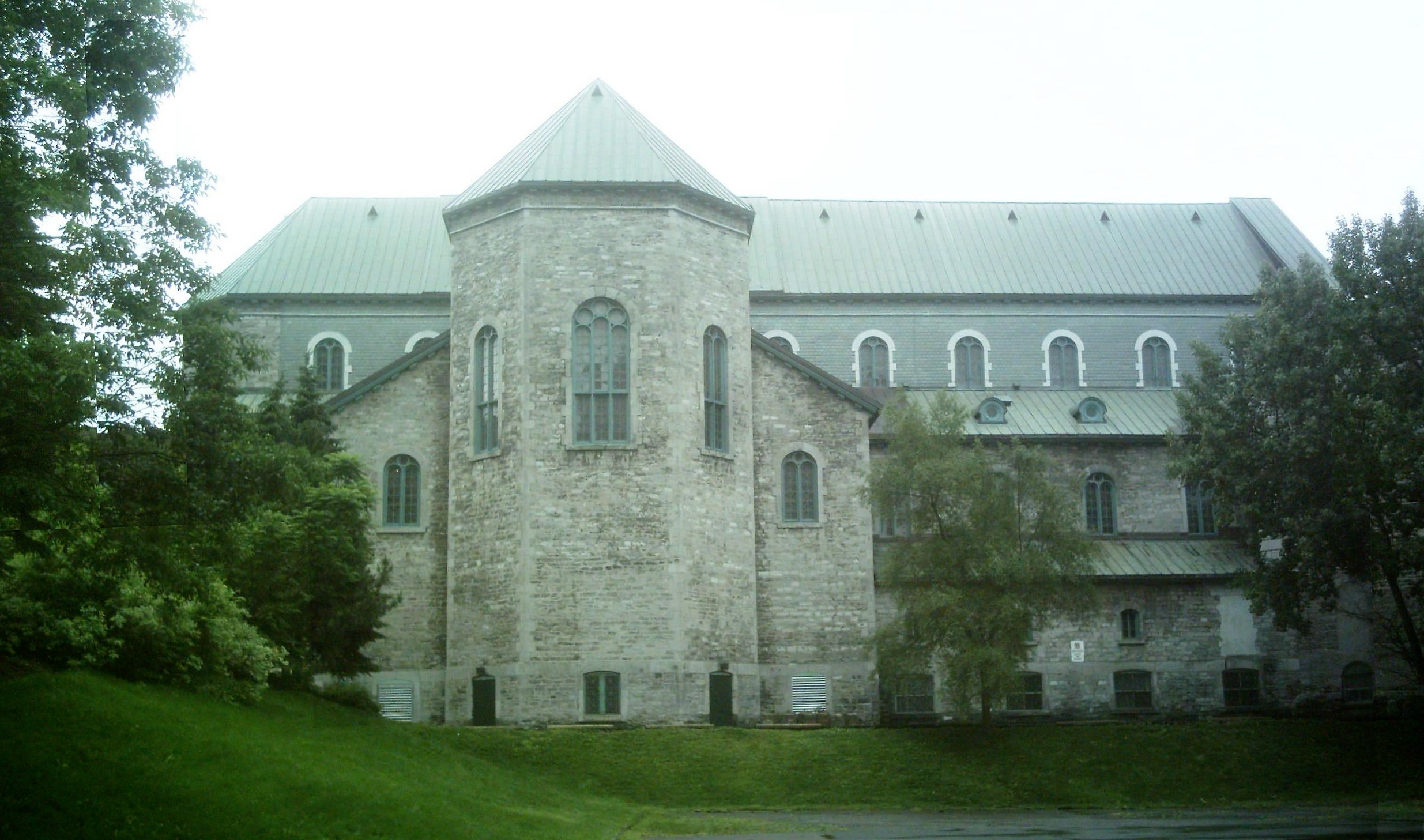
South view of the church

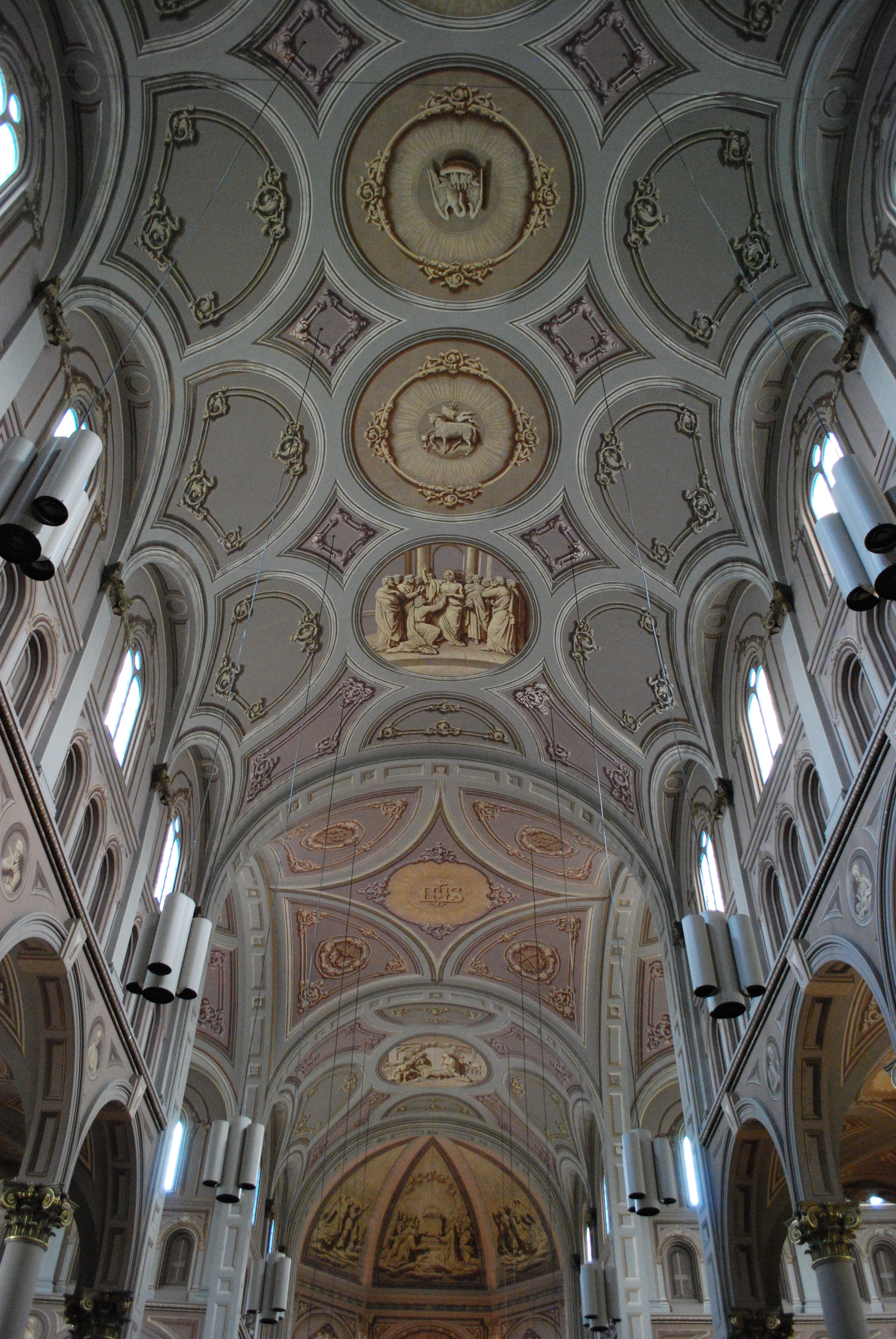
Ceiling

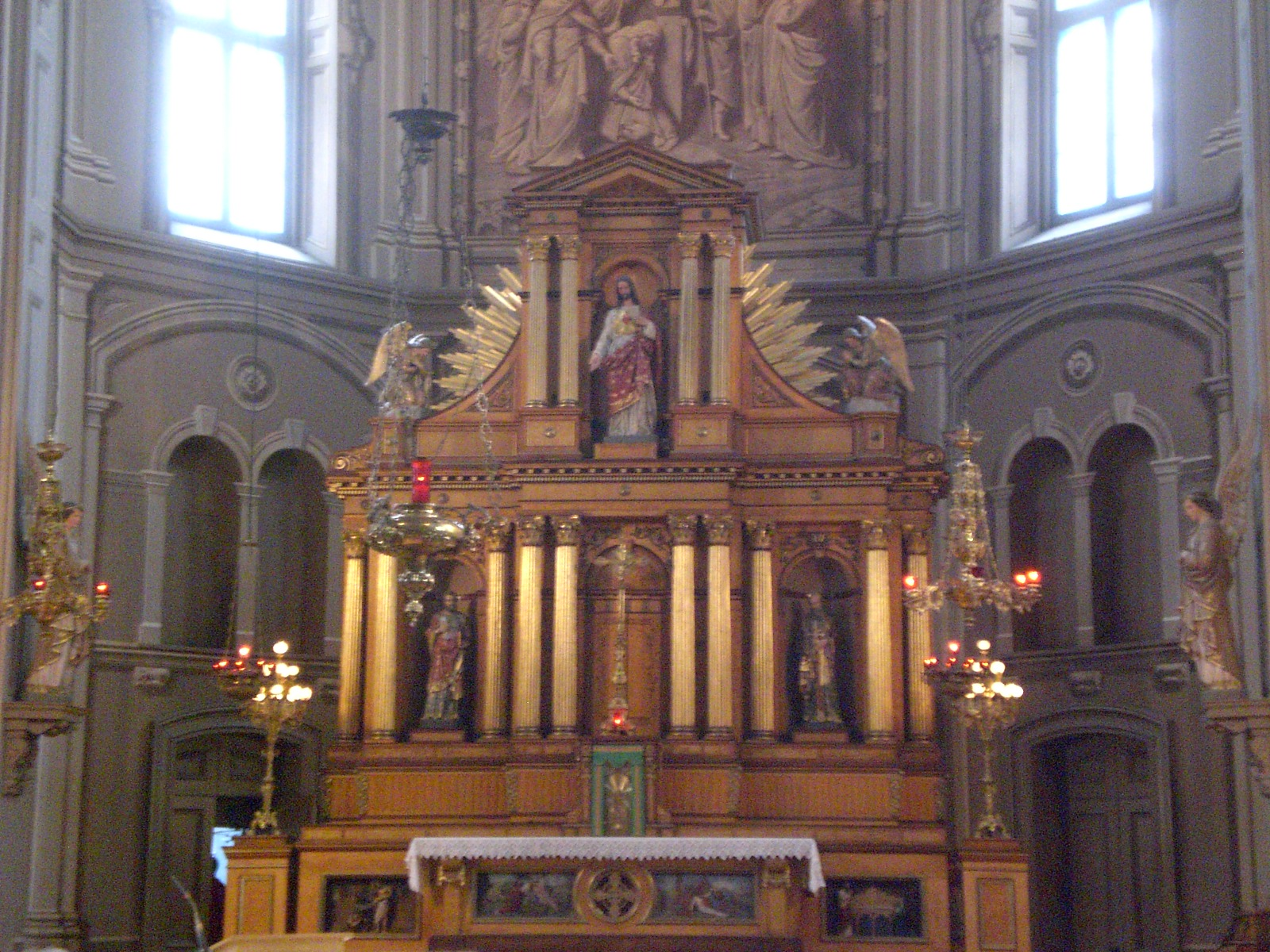
Main altar

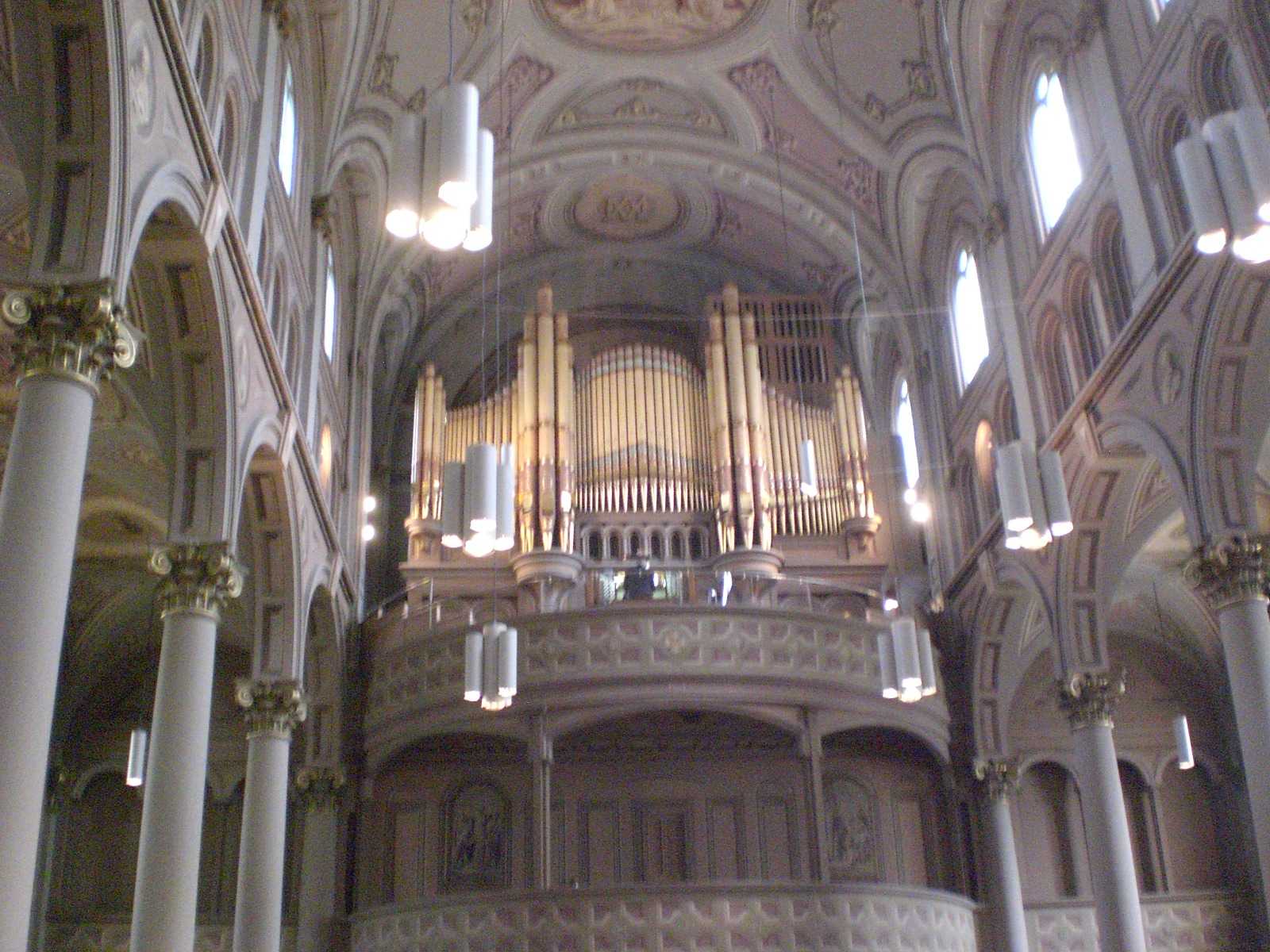
Organ

== See also ==
- List of Jesuit sites
