= Robert Lebel =

Robert Lebel may refer to:

- Robert Lebel (bishop) (1924–2015), Canadian Roman Catholic prelate, bishop
- Robert Lebel (ice hockey) (1905–1999), Canadian ice hockey administrator
- Robert Lebel (art critic) (1901–1986), French art critic and writer, father of Jean-Jacques Lebel
