= Villa Saint Martin =

Coordinates: 45.45554506221492°N 73.9374535842536°W

Villa Saint-Martin - ISCM
- Ignatian Spirituality Centre of Montréal
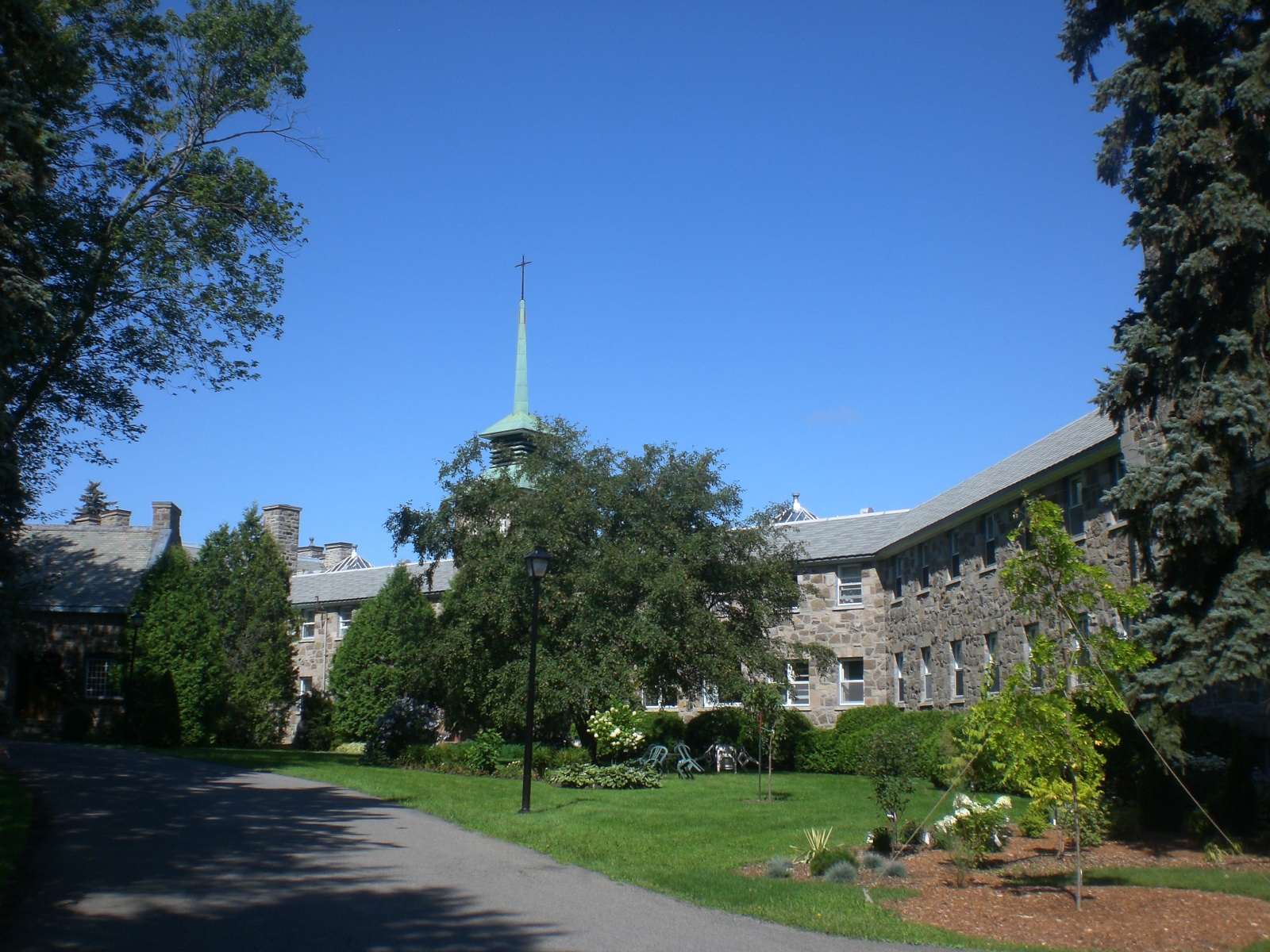
- View of the front of the centre

- Location in Montreal
- Location: 21269 Boul Gouin O, Pierrefonds, QC H9K 1C1
- Country: Canada
- Denomination: Roman Catholic

History
- Status: Active
- Founded: November 2, 1913
- Founder: Society of Jesus
- Dedication: Martin of Tours

Architecture
- Functional status: Group and Individual Spiritual Retreat Centre

Administration
- Province: Montreal
- Archdiocese: Montreal

Ignatian Spirituality Centre of Montreal - Villa Saint-Martin is a centre in Ignatian spirituality run by the Society of Jesus in Montreal, Quebec, Canada. It was the first residential spirituality centre in Canada. It was founded in 1913 and opened by the Archbishop of Montreal, Paul Bruchési. The new Villa St-Martin is located on the lac des Deux Montagnes at the western end of the island of Montreal. It is set in a serene setting neighbouring the Parc-nature du Cap-Saint-Jacques, Montréal’s largest park.

== History ==
=== Foundation ===
The first residential retreat in Canada happened in 1910 in Boucherville and was organized by Fr. Joseph Archambeault. Three years later a retreat house was purchased in L'Abord-à-Plouffe. It was within the parish of Saint-Martin in Laval, Quebec, which is why the centre became dedicated to Saint Martin.

On 2 November 1913, the Villa Saint Martin was opened by the Archbishop of Montreal, Paul Bruchési. Following the opening, the first retreat at the centre was led by Fr. Ruhlmann SJ and accompanied by the Archbishop of Winnipeg, Arthur Alfred Sinnott and the Apostolic Delegate to Canada, Peregrine Stagni.

The number of retreatants at the centre increased every year until World War II. After the end of the war, the house's main benefactor, who paid for its construction, Mr. Édouard Gohier financially struggled in the post-war economic collapse.

=== New site ===
In 1951, the current building for the centre was bought. It was originally built in 1900. The house was officially opened as a retreat house on 21 June 1953 by the Archbishop of Montreal, Paul-Émile Léger.

In the 1960s and 1970s the program of activities at the centre was expanded. The centre moved away from traditional weekend retreats for parish groups. More activity was focussed on married couples, and evening sessions were introduced. In the 1970s Alcoholics Anonymous groups started at the centre. In 1995, six- and eight-day retreats for smaller groups with personal spiritual directors were started. In 2001, more ecumenical projects were launched.

== Overview ==
Retreats at the villa are based on the Spiritual Exercises of Ignatius of Loyola. A variety of retreats are offered, 3, 5, and 8 day accompanied retreats to ones based on art, themed retreats, and retreats in daily life.

== See also ==
- Ignatian spirituality
- List of Jesuit sites
