= Jean-Claude Turcotte =

Canadian Roman Catholic cardinal (1936–2015)

His Eminence Jean-Claude Turcotte
- Cardinal, Archbishop Emeritus of Montreal
- Church: Roman Catholic Church
- Archdiocese: Montreal
- Province: Montreal
- Metropolis: Montreal
- See: Montreal
- Appointed: 17 March 1990
- Term ended: 20 March 2012
- Predecessor: Paul Grégoire
- Successor: Christian Lépine
- Other post: Cardinal-Priest of Nostra Signora del Santissimo Sacramento e Santi Martiri Canadesi
- Previous posts: Auxiliary Bishop of Montreal (1982–1990); Titular Bishop of Suas (1982–1990); President of the Canadian Episcopal Conference (1997–1999)

Orders
- Ordination: 24 May 1959 by Laurent Morin
- Consecration: 29 June 1982 by Paul Grégoire
- Created cardinal: 26 November 1994 by Pope John Paul II
- Rank: Cardinal-Priest

Personal details
- Born: 26 June 1936 Montreal, Quebec, Canada
- Died: 8 April 2015 (aged 78) Montreal, Quebec, Canada
- Denomination: Roman Catholic
- Motto: Servir le Seigneur dans la Joie; ("Serve the Lord in joy")
- Coat of arms: Jean-Claude Turcotte's coat of arms

Styles of Jean-Claude Turcotte
- Reference style: His Eminence
- Spoken style: Your Eminence
- Informal style: Cardinal
- See: Montreal

Jean-Claude Turcotte (French pronunciation: [ʒɑ̃klod tyʁkɔt]; 26 June 1936 – 8 April 2015) was a Canadian Roman Catholic cardinal who served as the Archbishop of the Roman Catholic Archdiocese of Montreal from 1990 to 2012.

== Early life and priesthood ==
Jean-Claude Turcotte was born on 26 June 1936, one of the seven children of Paul-Émile Turcotte. From 1947 to 1955, Turcotte attended College André-Grasset, then the Grand Seminaire. He graduated from the Université de Montréal with a degree in theology.

Turcotte was ordained as a priest on 24 May 1959 and undertook further studies in Lille from 1964 to 1965, earning a diploma in social ministry in 1965.

== Bishop and archbishop ==
On 14 April 1982, Pope John Paul II appointed him titular bishop of Suas and auxiliary bishop of Montreal. He was consecrated on 29 June in the Montreal Cathedral. Turcotte organized the Montreal leg of the Pope's 1984 visit to Canada. Turcotte was appointed Archbishop of Montreal on 17 March 1990.

Ordination history of Jean-Claude Turcotte
History
Episcopal consecration
- Consecrated by: Paul Card. Grégoire (Montreal)
- Date: 29 June 1982
Episcopal succession
Bishops consecrated by Jean-Claude Turcotte as principal consecrator
- Vital Massé (Auxiliary Saint-Jérôme aux.): 8 December 1993
- Neil E. Willard (Montreal aux.): 15 August 1995
- André Rivest (Montreal aux.): 15 August 1995
- Anthony Mancini (Montreal aux.): 25 March 1999
- Louis Dicaire (Montreal aux.): 25 March 1999
- Luc Cyr (Valleyfield): 17 June 2001
- Émilius Goulet (Saint-Boniface): 16 September 2001
- André Gazaille (Montreal aux.): 25 March 2006
- Lionel Gendron (Montreal aux.): 25 March 2006

On 26 November 1994, Pope John Paul II made Turcotte a cardinal, assigning him as a Cardinal-Priest to Nostra Signora del Santissimo Sacramento e Santi Martiri Canadesi. Following his elevation, he was named a member of the Congregation for the Causes of Saints, the Congregation for the Evangelization of Peoples, and the Pontifical Council for Social Communications.

He served as president of the Canadian Episcopal Conference from 1997 to 1999 and participated in World Youth Days in 1993, 1997, 2000, and 2002.

Turcotte was known for his work with the poor and he wrote a weekly religion column in the Sunday edition of the Journal de Montréal. In 1997, he commented on Quebec being a distinct society.

Turcotte was a voting member (cardinal elector) of the College of Cardinals in the 2005 papal conclave. Margaret Hebblethwaite, co-author of the book The Next Pope, identified him as a potential candidate papabile. Other sources, including the BBC, also mentioned him as a long-shot possibility for pope. He was also one of the cardinal electors who participated in the 2013 papal conclave that elected Pope Francis.

Nicole Fournier, who led the Accueil Bonneau organization for the homeless, stated that Turcotte "watched over people with a look that was never judgmental, ... (and) supported many social causes, especially those touching the less fortunate, notably the homeless." John Allen wrote in the 2002 book Conclave that Turcotte was seen as a "diamond in the rough, a potentially magnificent leader who is still finding his way." Potential impediments to becoming pope included not being proficient in the Italian language and his lack of international experience.

== Death ==
Turcotte died in Montreal on 8 April 2015, at the age of 78.

== Views ==
=== Abortion ===
In 2007, Turcotte presided over the funeral of Supreme Court Justice Antonio Lamer, who had written the court's opinion in Tremblay v. Daigle (1989), which removed all restrictions on abortion. At the funeral, he praised Lamer as "a giant of the law" and a man "who worked a great deal for justice," without directly addressing the abortion ruling.

On 11 September 2008, Turcotte returned his Order of Canada insignia (appointed in 1996) in protest of the induction of pro-choice activist Henry Morgentaler on 1 July 2008. After the Consultative Council for the Order of Canada did not reconsider the appointment, Turcotte renounced his title as Officer of the Order of Canada and returned his insignia, becoming effective on 1 June 2009.

In a 2009 interview, Turcotte stated, "I can understand that in certain cases, there is almost no other choice than to practice (abortion)," which was viewed as controversial given his previous stance on Morgentaler.

=== Political ties ===
In 2004, he criticized statements by former minister Sheila Copps regarding Turcotte's relationship with Pierre Trudeau. He was present at Trudeau's state funeral.

=== Women's ordination ===
Turcotte was reportedly favorable to the ordination of women as deacons after a local synod proposed the idea.

== Brian Boucher controversy ==
An investigative report commissioned by the church found that Turcotte was among Archdiocese of Montreal officials who failed to act on complaints that priest Brian Boucher was sexually abusing boys. Quebec Superior Court Justice Pepita Capriolo led the inquiry, and the report was released on 25 November 2020. Boucher pleaded guilty to sex abuse charges in January 2019 and received an eight-year prison sentence.

Catholic Church titles
Preceded by Paul Grégoire	Roman Catholic Archbishop of Montreal; 1990–2012	Succeeded by Christian Lépine
