= Paul Grégoire =

Canadian Cardinal

- Cardinal, Archbishop of Montreal
- See: Montreal
- Appointed: April 20, 1968
- Installed: May 22, 1968
- Term ended: March 17, 1990
- Predecessor: Paul-Émile Léger
- Successor: Jean-Claude Turcotte
- Other post: Cardinal-Priest of Nostra Signora del Santissimo Sacramento e Santi Martiri Canadesi (1988–1993)
- Previous posts: Auxiliary Bishop of Montreal (1961–1968); Titular Bishop of Curubis (1961–1968); Apostolic Administrator of Montreal (1967–1968)

Orders
- Ordination: May 22, 1937
- Consecration: December 27, 1961 by Paul-Émile Léger
- Created cardinal: June 28, 1988 by Pope John Paul II

Personal details
- Born: October 24, 1911 Viauville, Montreal, Quebec, Canada
- Died: October 30, 1993 (aged 82)
- Motto: Caritas Et Sapientia; ("Charity and Wisdom")

Ordination history
History
Priestly ordination
- Date: May 22, 1937
Episcopal consecration
- Consecrated by: Paul-Émile Léger
- Date: 27 December 1961
Episcopal succession
Bishops consecrated by Paul Grégoire as principal consecrator
- Leonard James Crowley: February 8, 1971
- Gérard Tremblay: March 20, 1981
- Jude Saint-Antoine: March 20, 1981
- Jean-Claude Turcotte: April 14, 1982
- Gilles Lussier: December 23, 1988

Paul Grégoire, OC (October 24, 1911 – October 30, 1993) was a Canadian Cardinal of the Roman Catholic Church. He served as Archbishop of Montreal from 1968 to 1990, and was elevated to the cardinalate in 1988.

== Biography ==
Paul Grégoire was born in Viauville, Montreal, to J. Albert Grégoire and Marie Lavoie, but his family moved to Verdun shortly after his birth. He had two younger brothers, but his parents later adopted nine of his cousins. He studied at the Minor Seminary of St. Thérèse in Blainville from 1925 to 1933, and then at the Major Seminary of Montréal from 1933 to 1937, where he obtained a licentiate in theology. He was ordained a priest on May 22, 1937, and then taught at St. Thérèse in Blanville until 1939. From 1939 to 1942, he furthered his studies at the University of Montréal, where he earned doctorates in philosophy and history, licentiate in letters, and diploma in pedagogy.

In 1979, he was made an Officer of the Order of Canada.
