= Gérard Tremblay =

Canadian Roman Catholic bishop (1918–2019)

The Most Reverend Gérard Tremblay P.S.S.
- Titular Bishop of Trisipa
- Church: Roman Catholic Church
- See: Titular See of Trisipa
- In office: 1981 - 2019
- Predecessor: Raymundo Joseph Peña
- Successor: Vacant
- Previous post: Priest

Orders
- Ordination: June 16, 1946
- Consecration: May 22, 1981

Personal details
- Born: October 27, 1918 Montreal, Quebec, Canada
- Died: 28 September 2019 (aged 100) Montreal, Quebec, Canada

Gérard Tremblay, P.S.S. (October 27, 1918 – September 28, 2019) was a Canadian bishop of the Roman Catholic Church.

Tremblay was born in Montreal, Quebec, Canada, and ordained a priest on June 16, 1946, for the Society of Saint-Sulpice. He was appointed auxiliary bishop of the Archdiocese of Montreal and titular bishop of Trisipa on March 20, 1981, and consecrated on May 22, 1981. Tremblay retired as auxiliary bishop of Montreal on August 27, 1991. He turned 100 in October 2018.
