= Joseph Charbonneau =

Canadian archbishop

Joseph Charbonneau †
- Archbishop Emeritus of Montreal
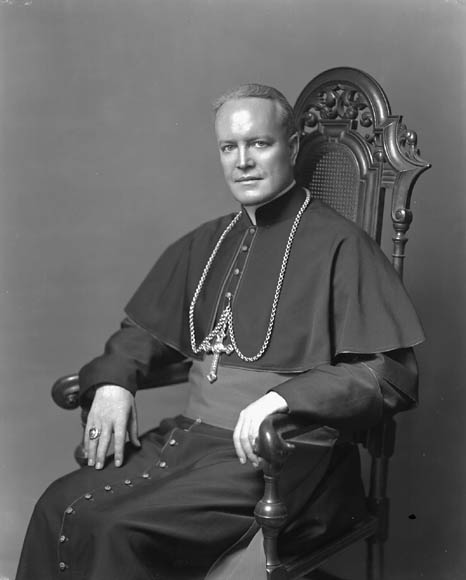
- Church: Roman Catholic Church
- See: Montreal
- In office: August 31, 1940 – February 9, 1950
- Predecessor: Georges Gauthier †
- Successor: Paul-Émile Léger †

Personal details
- Born: July 31, 1892 Lefaivre, Canada
- Died: November 19, 1959 (aged 67) Victoria, British Columbia, Canada
- Coat of arms

Joseph Charbonneau (July 31, 1892 – November 19, 1959) was a Canadian prelate of the Roman Catholic Church, who served as Archbishop of Montreal from 1940 to 1950.

Born in Lefaivre, Alfred and Plantagenet, he was ordained to the priesthood on June 24, 1916. He went to Rome where he completed doctorates in philosophy and canon law at the Angelicum. He taught at the Séminaire de Sainte-Thérèse.

On June 22, 1939, Charbonneau was appointed Bishop of Hearst by Pope Pius XI. He received his episcopal consecration on the following August 15 from Archbishop Joseph-Guillaume-Laurent Forbes, with Archbishop Emile Yelle, PSS, and Bishop Louis Rhéaume, OMI, serving as co-consecrators. Charbonneau was later named Coadjutor Archbishop of Montreal and Titular Archbishop of Amorium on May 21, 1940. He succeeded the late Georges Gauthier as Archbishop of Montreal on August 31, 1940.

He is best known in Canada for his pro-labour role in the Asbestos Strike. A highly active group of priests, who were involved in the Catholic labor movement, started organizing annual sessions to discuss the professional organization of workers from 1945. The same group was officially established in 1948 as an advisory body, covering the post-war social and economic problems facing the Quebec society, under the Assembly of Quebec Bishops. With the support of Charbonneau and other Quebec bishops, the group started a province-wide fund to assist strikers and their families during the Asbestos Strike, enabling the strikers to prolong the strike. Charbonneau delivered a pro-union speech asking all Catholics to donate to help the strikers, stating that, "There is a conspiracy to destroy the working class, and it is the Church's duty to intervene." Premier Duplessis asked the Church to transfer the archbishop because of his encouragement of the strike; however, other explanations for Charbonneau's resignation have been offered. Upon his resignation on February 9, 1950, Charbonneau was made titular Archbishop of Bosphorus and accepted work in British Columbia as a hospital chaplain.

For his interest in interdenominational dialogue, the rights of organised labour, and the well-being of minority groups, Archbishop Charbonneau has been seen as a precursor to the Quiet Revolution.

The City of Montreal dedicated Monseigneur-Charbonneau Square to him, between Robert-Bourassa Boulevard and René-Lévesque Boulevard.

Located on Rousselot Street in Montreal, the Joseph-Charbonneau School is a specialized school for students aged 12–21 who have a motor disability, whether or not they have a sensory or intellectual disability.

A Monseigneur-Charbonneau Prize is awarded by the Montreal Justice and Faith Roundtable.

Religious titles
Preceded by Georges Gauthier	Archbishop of Montreal; 1940–1950	Succeeded by Paul-Émile Léger
