= Diocese of Valleyfield =

Catholic ecclesiastical territory

Diocese of Valleyfield Dioecesis Campivallensis
- The Coat of Arms of the Diocese of Valleyfield

Location
- Country: Canada
- Territory: Québec
- Ecclesiastical province: Archdiocese of Montreal
- Headquarters: Salaberry-de-Valleyfield, Canada

Statistics
- Area: 3,225 km^{2} (1,245 sq mi)
- Population: Total; Catholics: (as of 2017); 290,153; 211,299 (72.8%)
- Parishes: 23
- Churches: 43

Information
- First holder: Joseph-Médard Émard
- Denomination: Roman Catholic
- Sui iuris church: Latin Church
- Rite: Roman Rite
- Established: 1892
- Cathedral: Basilica Cathedral of St. Cecilia
- Patron saint: Saint Cecilia
- Secular priests: 48
- Language: French, English, Spanish and Mohawk language

Current leadership
- Pope: Leo XIV
- Bishop: Alain Faubert
- Metropolitan Archbishop: Christian Lépine
- Vicar General: André Lafleur
- Judicial Vicar: Jean Trudeau
- Bishops emeritus: Noël Simard

Website
- https://www.diocesevalleyfield.org

The Roman Catholic Diocese of Valleyfield (Latin: Dioecesis Campivallensis) is a Catholic diocese in Quebec and a suffragan of the Archdiocese of Montreal. It was erected in 1892.

The diocese, which is based in the western suburbs of Montreal, features approximately 201,000 baptized Catholics. Parishioners are served by 48 priests, 17 deacons, 31 religious brothers, and 76 religious sisters. In 2008, the diocese consolidated its 63 parishes into 24.

== Bishops ==
=== Ordinaries ===
- Joseph-Médard Émard (1892–1922), appointed Archbishop of Ottawa
- Felix-Raymond-Marie Rouleau, O.P. (1923–1926), appointed Archbishop of Québec (elevated to Cardinal in 1927)
- Joseph Alfred Langlois (1926–1966)
- Percival Caza (1966–1969)
- Guy Bélanger (1969–1975)
- Robert Lebel (1976–2000)
- Luc Cyr (2001–2011), appointed Archbishop of Sherbrooke, Québec
- Noël Simard (2011–2024)
- Alain Faubert (2024–present)

=== Coadjutor bishop ===
- Percival Caza (1955–1966)

=== Auxiliary bishop ===
- Percival Caza (1948–1955), appointed Coadjutor here

=== Other priests of this diocese who became bishop ===
- Bernard Hubert, appointed Bishop of Saint-Jérôme, Québec in 1971
- Paul-Émile Léger, appointed Archbishop of Montreal, Québec in 1950

=== Other priest of this diocese who became cardinal ===
- Paul-Émile Léger, appointed Cardinal in 1953
