= Nostra Signora del Santissimo Sacramento e Santi Martiri Canadesi =

- Our Lady of the Blessed Sacrament and the Holy Canadian Martyrs (in English); Domini Nostræ e Santissimo Sacramenti et Sanctorum Martyrum Canadesium (in Latin)
- The eastern façade
- Click on the map for a fullscreen view
- 41°55′03″N 12°31′08″E
- Location: Via Giovanni Battista de Rossi 46, Rome
- Country: Italy
- Denomination: Roman Catholic
- Tradition: Roman rite

History
- Status: Titular church, national church
- Dedication: Mary, mother of Jesus and the Canadian Martyrs
- Consecrated: 1962

Architecture
- Architect: Bruno Maria Apollonj Ghetti
- Architectural type: Church
- Style: Modernist
- Groundbreaking: 1950
- Completed: 1955

Nostra Signora del Santissimo Sacramento e dei Santi Martiri Canadesi (French: Notre-Dame-du-Très-Saint-Sacrement-et-Saints-Martyrs-Canadiens, "Our Lady of the Blessed Sacrament and the Canadian Martyrs") is the Roman Catholic national church of Canada, located at 46, Via Giovanni Battista de Rossi, Rome.

== Description ==
It is a titular church, since February 1965 when Maurice Roy became its first Cardinal-Priest. Patrick D'Rozario has held the title since 2016. It was made a parish church, served by the Congregation of Priests of the Most Holy Sacrament, by Pope Pius XII. The Redemptorist Generalate is adjacent.

The church was close to the Canadian embassy, until the embassy re-located in 2007. Initially, the church was named Nostra Signora del Santissimo Sacramento (Our Lady of the Blessed Sacrament) but was re-consecrated in 1962.

The church was designed around 1950 by Bruno Apollini Ghetti. The façade mosaic is by Marko Ivan Rupnik. There is a small raccoon in the bottom right hand corner. The church contains a high altar designed by Francesco Nagni, ceramic decorations (including a fine crucifix) by Angelo Biancini. Biancini's terracotta ambo has panels depicting The Last Supper and the Madonna and Child. The stained glass windows are by János Hajnal and Marcello Avenali.

== Cardinal priests ==
Pope Paul VI established as titular church on 25 February 1965.

- Maurice Roy, Archbishop of Quebec, 25 February 1965 appointed–24 October 1985 died
- Paul Grégoire, Archbishop of Montreal, 28 June 1988 appointed–30 October 1993 died
- Jean-Claude Turcotte, Archbishop of Montreal, 26 November 1994 appointed–8 April 2015 died
- Patrick D'Rozario, Archbishop of the Dhaka, 19 November 2016 appointed- present

== Images ==
View from outside

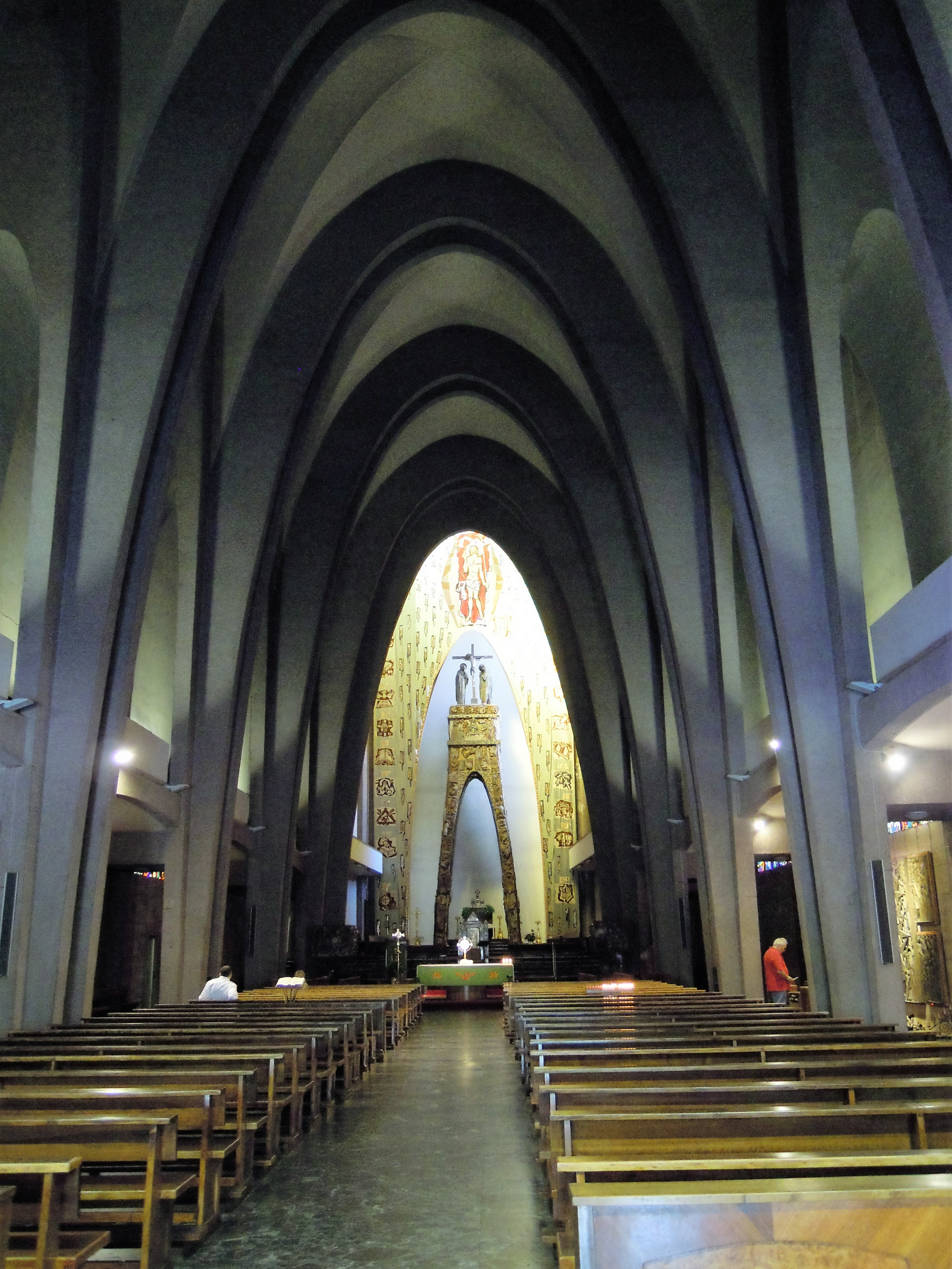
The nave

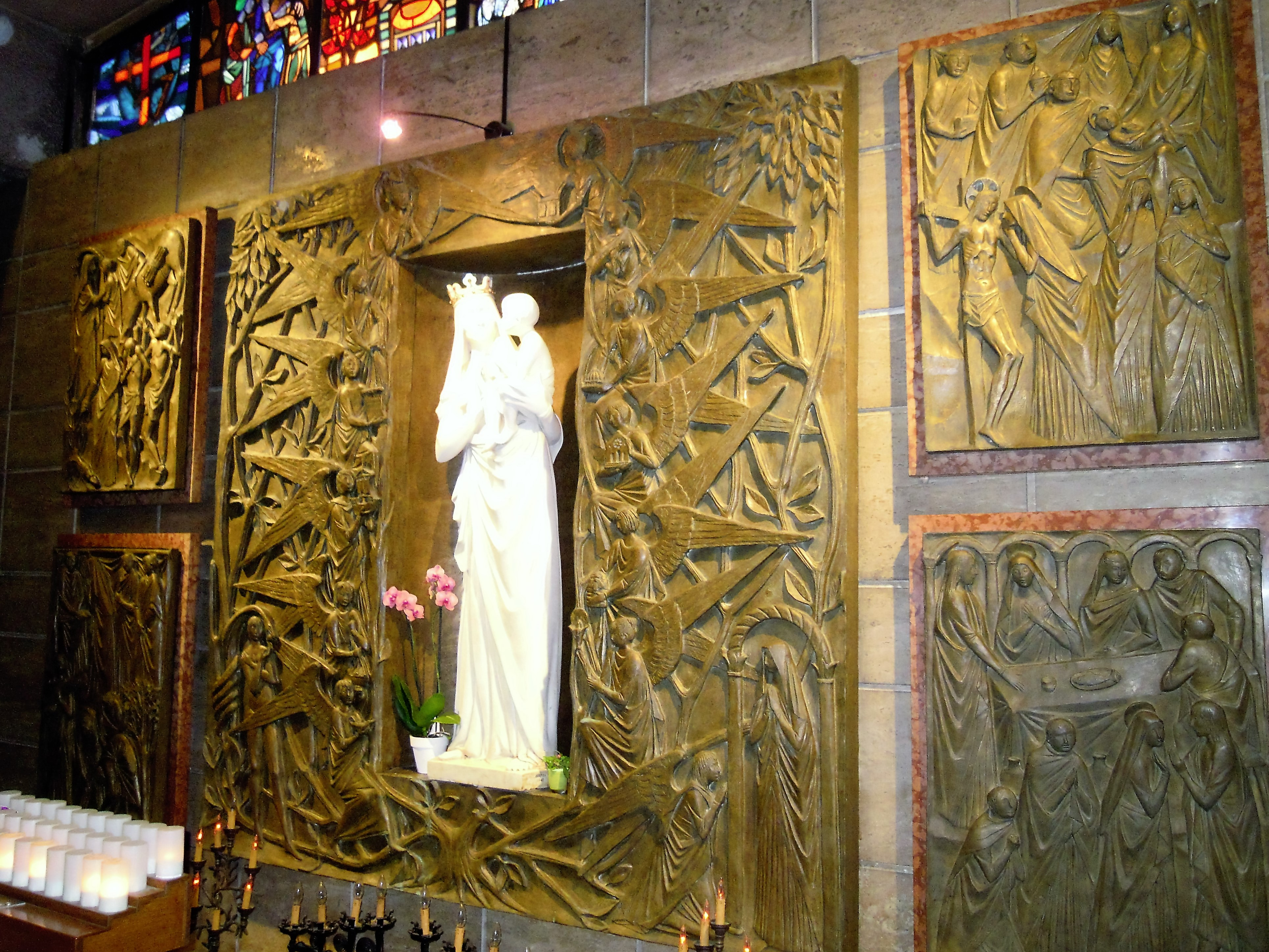
Monument to Mary, mother of Jesus

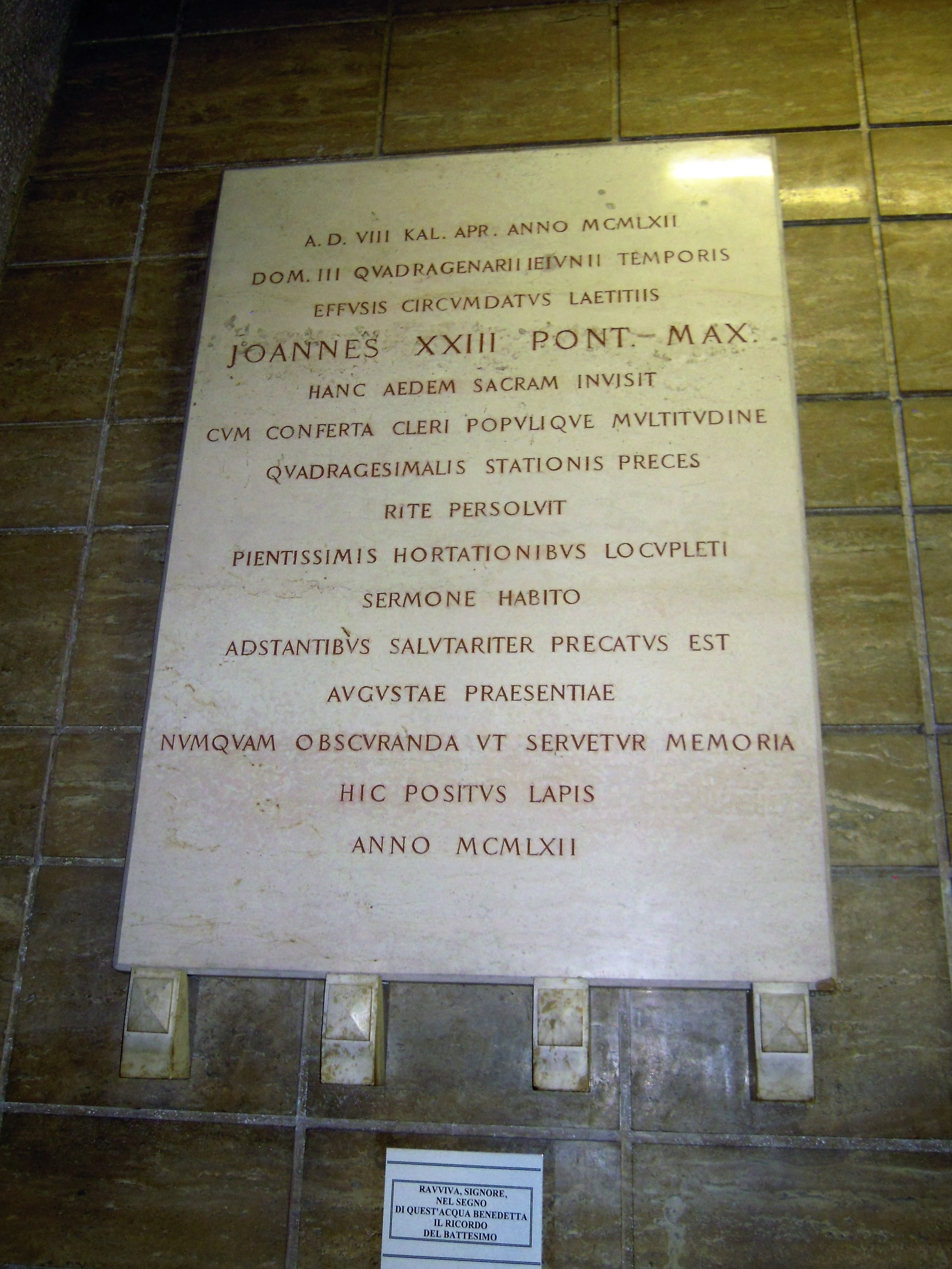
Memorial stone of pope John XXIII (1962)

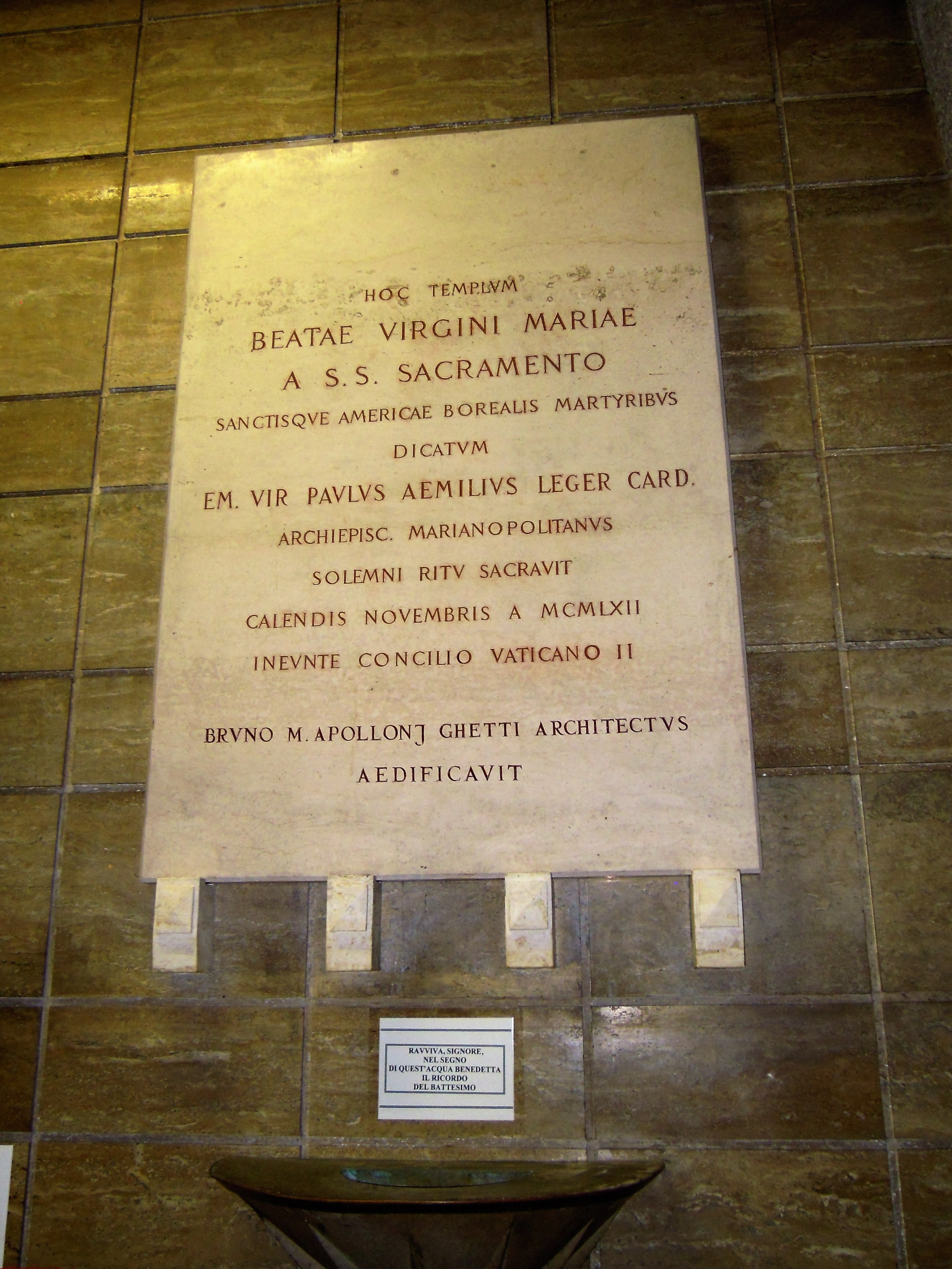
Plaque commemorating the consecration of the church (1962)

== Popular culture ==
- Shortly after completion, Fellini shot a scene in the church for his film La Dolce Vita (1960), during which Bach's Toccata and Fugue in D minor is played on the church organ.
