= Paul-Émile Léger =

Canadian Catholic cardinal (1904–1991)

His Eminence Paul-Émile Léger CC GOQ PSS
- Cardinal, Archbishop emeritus of Montreal
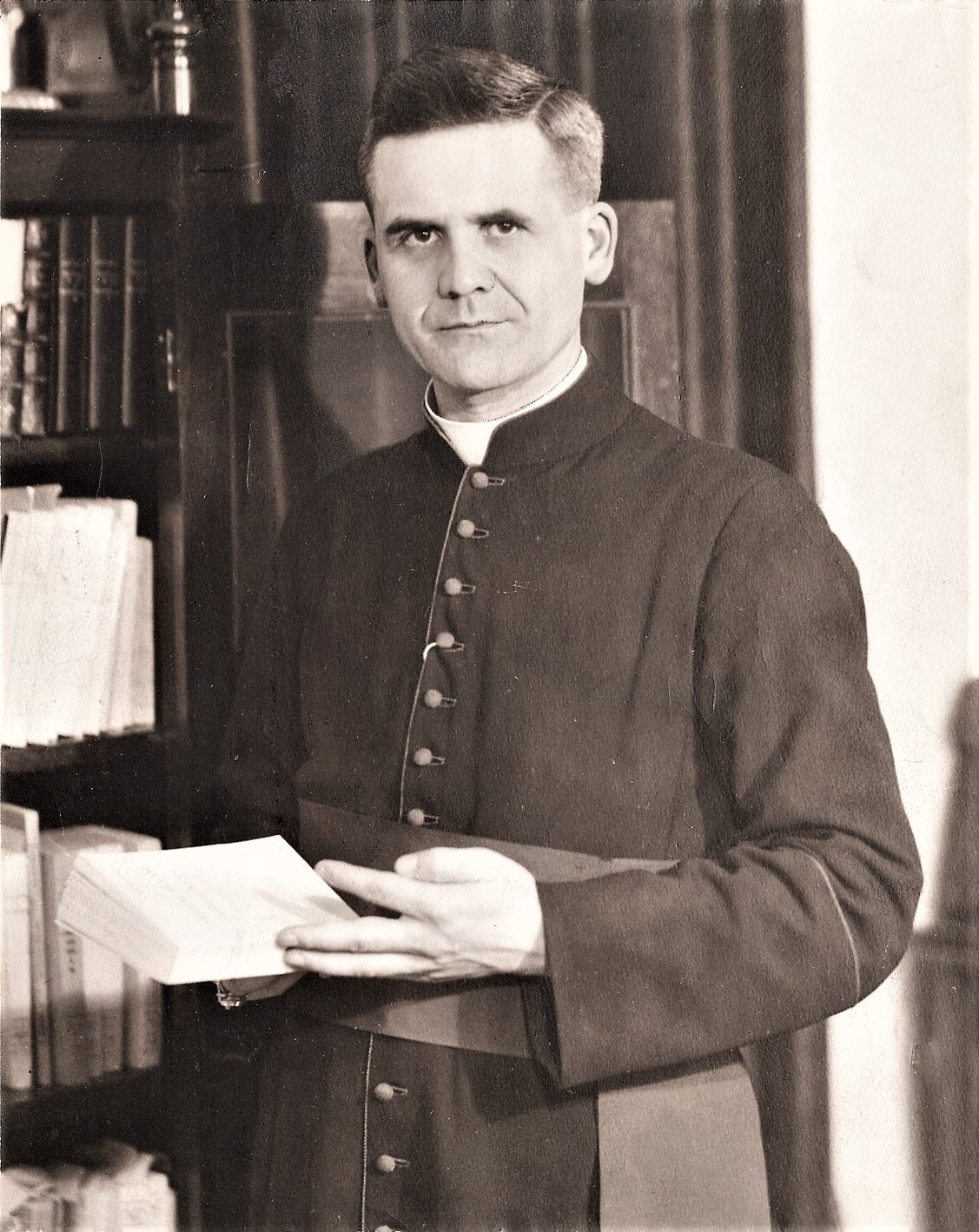
- Léger in 1941
- See: Montreal (emeritus)
- Appointed: March 25, 1950
- Installed: April 26, 1950
- Term ended: April 20, 1968
- Predecessor: Joseph Charbonneau
- Successor: Paul Grégoire
- Other post: Previously rector of Pontifical Canadian College

Orders
- Ordination: May 25, 1929
- Consecration: April 26, 1950 by Adeodato Giovanni Piazza
- Created cardinal: January 12, 1953 by Pope Pius XII

Personal details
- Born: April 26, 1904 Salaberry-de-Valleyfield, Quebec, Canada
- Died: November 13, 1991 (aged 87) Montreal, Quebec, Canada
- Motto: Ipsa duce non fatigaris (Latin for 'With her (the Blessed Virgin Mary) leading, you shall not tire')

Styles of Paul-Émile Léger
- Reference style: His Eminence
- Spoken style: Your Eminence
- Informal style: Cardinal
- See: Montreal (Emeritus)

Paul-Émile Léger CC GOQ PSS (April 26, 1904 – November 13, 1991) was a Canadian Catholic prelate, educator, missionary, and humanitarian. A member of the Society of Saint-Sulpice, he served as Archbishop of Montreal from 1950 to 1967 and was elevated to the College of Cardinals in 1953 by Pope Pius XII.

Known for his eloquent preaching, progressive leadership during the Second Vatican Council, and dedication to the poor, Léger resigned his archdiocese in 1967 to pursue missionary work among lepers and disabled people in Africa, where he established numerous aid projects. His humanitarian efforts extended globally, founding several foundations that continue to operate as of 2025.

Léger's legacy endures through institutions bearing his name, such as the Centre National de Réhabilitation des Personnes Handicapées Cardinal Paul-Émile Léger in Cameroon, and commemorations marking his contributions to ecumenism, social justice, and church reform. He was the elder brother of Jules Léger, who served as Governor General of Canada from 1974 to 1979.

== Early life and education ==
Paul-Émile Léger was born on April 26, 1904, in Salaberry-de-Valleyfield, Quebec, Canada, the eldest son of Ernest Léger, a general merchant, and Alda Beauvais. His family relocated to the bilingual village of Saint-Anicet on Lac Saint-François, southwest of Montreal, where he spent his childhood. There, he attended elementary school and served as an altar boy at the local church alongside his younger brother Jules. The bilingual environment allowed him to learn English early, as sermons were delivered in both French and English.

From 1916 to 1925, Léger pursued classical studies at the Petit Séminaire de Sainte-Thérèse north of Montreal. His education was interrupted in January 1920 for nearly four years due to illness, during which he worked in Lancaster, Ontario, in various manual jobs including mechanics, railway labor, and butchering. These experiences fostered his empathy for ordinary workers. Upon recovery, he returned to Quebec, where his family had settled in Saint-Polycarpe and operated a general store. He studied philosophy and, during summers, staged plays with Jules, showcasing his early dramatic talent and flair for public speaking.

In 1925, Léger entered the Jesuit novitiate at Sault-au-Récollet in Montreal but was deemed too emotional for the order after four years. He then studied theology at the Grand Séminaire de Montréal from 1925 to 1929. Ordained a priest on May 25, 1929, he was initially assigned to the Diocese of Valleyfield and served briefly in the parish of Notre-Dame in Montreal. In September 1929, Léger joined the Society of Saint-Sulpice (Sulpicians), a congregation focused on priestly formation.

He completed his novitiate in Issy-les-Moulineaux, France, from 1929 to 1930, followed by studies in canon law at the Institut Catholique de Paris, earning a bachelor's degree in 1931. He taught canon law at the theological seminary for a year and served as assistant master at the novitiate in 1932.

== Early priesthood and missionary work in Japan ==
Léger returned to Canada briefly in 1933 to visit his parents before departing for Japan on September 17, 1933, as one of the first Canadian Sulpicians in the country. Arriving in October, he was tasked with establishing a grand séminaire in Fukuoka to train indigenous clergy amid a Catholic population of fewer than 10,000 in a predominantly non-Christian nation. Mastering Japanese proved challenging; in a letter dated November 22, 1933, to Bishop Émile Yelle, he described the language study as an "asceticism" and lamented sounding like a "stammering child." By spring 1934, he was in Tokyo, and by September, he became curé of the cathedral in Fukuoka. Exhausted, he retired to Aohori (now Futtsu) in August 1935 to oversee the Sisters of St. Anne. From April 1937, he directed a preparatory course for seminarians in Omuta, teaching philosophy, Latin, and spirituality while serving as curé until March 1938. A cholera epidemic in 1937 interrupted his work, and conflicts with the local bishop over seminary management arose. He returned to Canada from December 1935 to October 1936 to promote his mission. Léger remained in Japan until the outbreak of World War II in 1939, leaving behind colleagues who were interned in 1941. The Japan Catholic Seminary was established in 1948, with a philosophy seminary opening in 1939 under his influence.

== Return to Canada and early appointments ==
Upon returning to Montreal in 1939, Léger taught sociology at the Séminaire de Philosophie and apologetics at the Institut Pie XI, affiliated with the Université de Montréal. His preaching gained prominence, particularly during a 1941 Lenten retreat at Notre-Dame church. In 1940, he was appointed vicar general of the Diocese of Valleyfield, curé of St. Cecilia Cathedral, and a chapter member under Bishop Joseph-Alfred Langlois. He temporarily withdrew from the Sulpicians until 1947. In 1947, Léger was named rector of the Pontifical Canadian College in Rome, resuming Sulpician duties. He met Pope Pius XII, distributed aid from the Gold Cross charity he founded in 1948 to support post-war Italy, and facilitated relations between the Holy See and Quebec clergy. He chaired the Canadian Catholic Conference from 1951 to 1953.

== Archbishop of Montreal ==
Léger was appointed Archbishop of Montreal on March 25, 1950, succeeding Joseph Charbonneau, whose resignation amid labor disputes and political tensions marked a turbulent period. Consecrated on April 26, 1950, in Rome's Basilica of St. Mary of the Angels and the Martyrs by Cardinal Adeodato Giovanni Piazza, assisted by Archbishop Maurice Roy and Bishop Jean-Julien Weber, he took possession of his see on May 16, 1950. As archbishop, Léger emphasized ultramontane loyalty to Pius XII. He organized communal projects, funded constructions like the Institut Dominique-Savio (1960) for youth, established charities such as the Foyer of Charity (1951) for the indigent and Hôpital Saint-Charles-Borromée (1956) for the chronically ill, and promoted piety through radio programs like "Le chapelet en famille." He expanded welfare organizations and served as papal legate at Lourdes (1954), St. Joseph's Oratory (1955), and Sainte-Anne-de-Beaupré (1958). Relations with clergy were sometimes strained due to his authoritative style, and with religious communities, complex over perceived autonomy. Amid Quebec's Quiet Revolution, Léger navigated institutional reforms in education, health, and social services, supporting Bill 60 (1964) establishing the Department of Education while maintaining church influence.

== Elevation to cardinal and pre-conciliar activities ==
On November 29, 1952, Pius XII named Léger a cardinal, one of the youngest in recent history at age 48. He received the red hat on January 12, 1953, becoming Montreal's first cardinal. This elevation enhanced his influence, allowing him to represent the pope at international events. Under Pope John XXIII, Léger's views evolved toward reform. Appointed to the Central Preparatory Commission for the Second Vatican Council on June 15, 1960, he launched a diocesan synod in December 1953 and a "Grande Mission" in 1960, modeled on Milan's, to engage the laity. Influenced by intellectuals like Pierre Elliott Trudeau and Gérard Pelletier, he published works like Les origines de l’homme (1961) on human evolution and a 1962 pastoral letter on ecumenism, establishing a Diocesan Commission for Ecumenism. Léger emphasized conjugal love over procreation in marriage, advocated responsible parenthood, and addressed birth control, aligning with John XXIII's aggiornamento.

== Role in the Second Vatican Council ==
During the Second Vatican Council (1962–1965), Léger emerged as a leading progressive voice, delivering 26 interventions—the second-highest number—focusing on ecumenism, family life (including marriage and procreation), freedom of thought, liturgy, religious liberty, and the role of Scripture. He collaborated with reform-minded cardinals like Maurice Roy, Antonio Caggiano, and Norman Gilroy, delivering a closing message on December 8, 1965. Léger supported religious liberty, urging a stronger condemnation of antisemitism as an act of a "renewed Church." On October 29, 1964, he advocated revising church teaching on birth control and emphasizing conjugal love in Gaudium et Spes. As a cardinal elector in the 1963 papal conclave, he participated in Faith and Order Commission sessions in September 1963. His positions strained relationships with conservative factions, including Cité Catholique, and led to a brief hospitalization in 1962–1963 after an indiscreet remark about John XXIII's health. Post-council, Léger implemented reforms in Montreal but faced resistance from Quiet Revolution forces and strained episcopal relations. He served on congregations including the Congregation for the Discipline of the Sacraments, Congregation of Rites, Congregation for Bishops, and the first Synod of Bishops (1967).

== Resignation and missionary work in Africa ==
From late December 1963 to early January 1964, Léger traveled to Africa, reigniting his missionary zeal. He launched the Fame Pereo charity for leprosaria and divested personal belongings to aid the poor. In 1964, he proposed resigning his see for missionary work, but Pope Paul VI rejected it. On November 9, 1967, Léger announced his resignation as archbishop to devote himself to African lepers, shocking the public and media. Challenges in Montreal, including population growth, priest shortages, and implementing Vatican directives, contributed, alongside his romantic idealism for missions. Departing Montreal on December 11, 1967, he visited leprosaria supported by Fame Pereo before settling in the Archdiocese of Yaoundé, Cameroon. There, he established around 40 aid projects, including the Centre de Rééducation des Handicapés de Yaoundé (1972, now the Centre National de Réhabilitation des Personnes Handicapées Cardinal Paul-Émile Léger). He dedicated himself to ministry until 1979, interrupted by Montreal visits in 1969–1970 and 1973–1976 for fundraising and pastoral roles. Léger served on the Pontifical Commission for Migrants and Tourism (1972–1979) and the Congregation for the Evangelization of Peoples (1972–1984).

== Later life and humanitarian efforts ==
After leaving Africa in 1979, Léger continued global humanitarian work, visiting centers in Laos, Cambodia, Vietnam, and Thailand (1980–1981), supporting a leper center in India (1982), commemorating his 50th mission anniversary in Japan (1983), and founding a hospital in Haiti (1985). He founded several organizations: Cardinal Léger and his Endeavours (1969), Jules and Paul-Émile Léger Foundation (1981, to which he bequeathed his property), Partners of the Cardinal (1983), Partners of the World (1986), and Elderaid (1986). From July 1984, he resided at the Séminaire de Saint-Sulpice in Montreal.

== Death ==
Paul-Émile Léger died on November 13, 1991, at age 87 in Montreal. He was the last surviving cardinal created by Pius XII. His funeral was attended by dignitaries, and he was interred in the crypt of Mary, Queen of the World Cathedral in Montreal.

== Legacy ==
Léger's legacy is marked by his transition from ecclesiastical authority to humble missionary service, influencing perceptions of church leadership. His progressive stances at Vatican II contributed to reforms in ecumenism, religious freedom, and family doctrine, though they polarized opinions. In Quebec, he navigated the Quiet Revolution, supporting secularization while defending church roles. His foundations continue aiding disabled people and poor worldwide. The Centre National de Réhabilitation des Personnes Handicapées Cardinal Paul-Émile Léger in Cameroon remains active, hosting collaborations like a 2025 visit by the Israeli embassy for cooperation discussions. Commemorations include the 25th anniversary of his death in 2016 and references in cultural works, such as the 2024 film Conclave, evoking his near-papal election rumors. Léger's eloquence and defense of the marginalized earned him enduring admiration, though critics noted his authoritarianism and impulsiveness. His archives are housed at the Bibliothèque du Grand Séminaire de Montréal.

== Views ==
=== Role during the Second Vatican Council ===
Léger was a prominent liberal at the council, advocating modernization and collaborating with progressives.

=== Religious liberty ===
He championed religious freedom, supporting declarations against antisemitism.

=== Birth control ===
In 1964, Léger urged reevaluating church teachings on contraception, prioritizing conjugal love.

=== Antisemitism ===
He called for a robust council statement condemning antisemitism.

=== Ecumenism ===
A cardinal elector in 1963, Léger promoted dialogue at Faith and Order sessions.

== Honours ==
Léger received numerous awards:

Grand Cross of the Order of Merit, Portugal (1965) Companion of the Order of Canada, Canada (1968) Grand Officer of the National Order of Quebec, Quebec, Canada (1985) Loyola Medal from Concordia University (1967) Grande Croix of the Légion d'honneur, France (1958) Pearson Peace Medal (1979) Prix Maisonneuve, Société Saint-Jean-Baptiste of Montréal (1983) Honorary doctorates from over 10 Canadian universities, including Université Laval, McGill University, and Université de Montréal.

Catholic Church titles
Preceded by Joseph Charbonneau	Archbishop of Montreal; 1950–1967	Succeeded by Paul Grégoire
