= Christian Lépine =

Canadian Catholic archbishop (born 1951)

The Most Reverend Christian Lépine
- Archbishop of Montreal
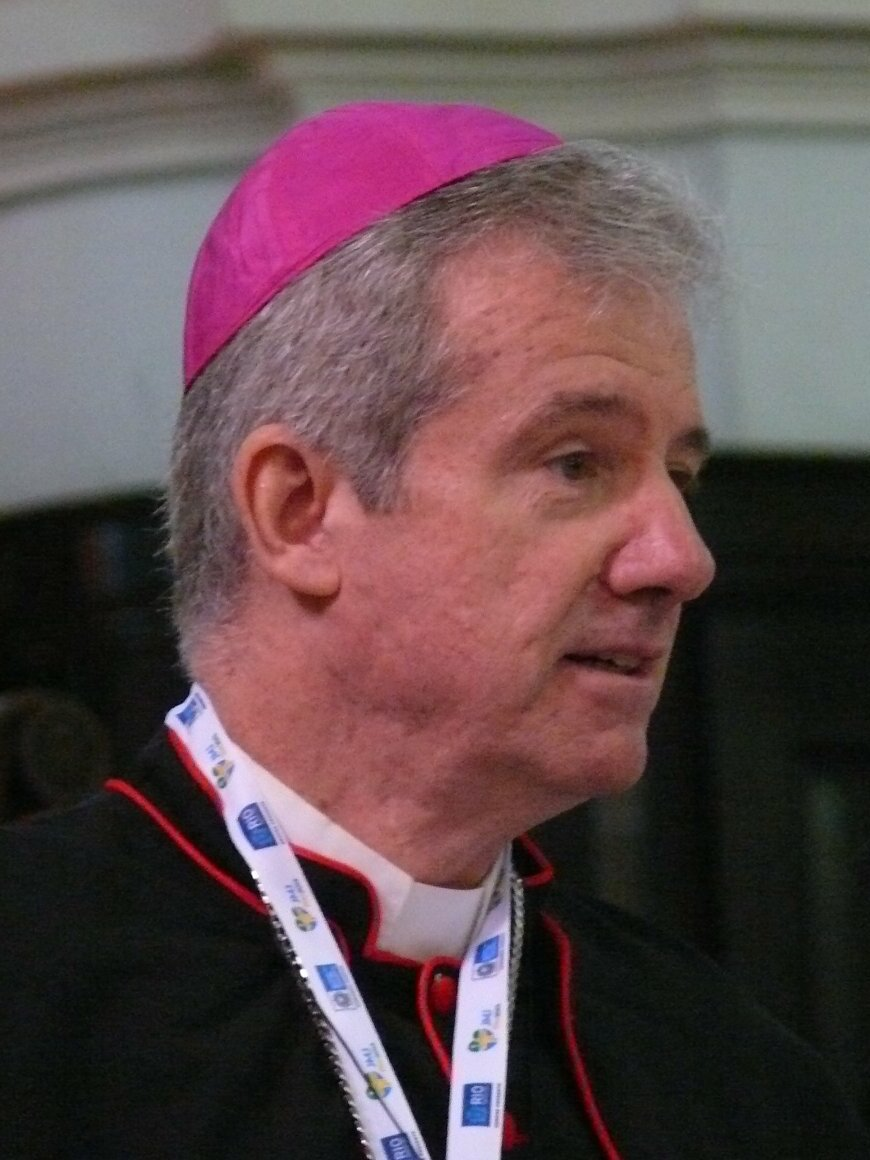
- Lépine in 2013
- Church: Catholic Church
- Archdiocese: Montreal
- Province: Montreal
- Appointed: 20 March 2012
- Installed: 27 April 2012
- Predecessor: Jean-Claude Turcotte
- Previous post: Auxiliary Bishop of Montreal (2011–2012)

Orders
- Ordination: 7 September 1983 by Paul Grégoire
- Consecration: 10 September 2011 by Jean-Claude Turcotte

Personal details
- Born: 18 September 1951 (age 75) Montreal, Quebec, Canada
- Coat of arms: Christian Lépine's coat of arms

Christian Lépine (French pronunciation: [kʁistjɑ̃ lepin]; born 18 September 1951) is a Canadian prelate of the Catholic Church who has been Archbishop of Montreal since March 2012, after eight months as an auxiliary bishop there. With the exception of two years working in the Roman Curia he has spent his entire career in Montreal.

== Biography ==
Christian Lépine was born in Montreal on 18 September 1951. He studied at the Royal Military College Saint-Jean and the École Polytechnique de Montréal and then entered the major seminary. He was ordained a priest on 7 September 1983, and then served as parish vicar for several years.

He studied theology at the Université de Montréal and philosophy at the Pontifical Gregorian University in Rome from 1986 to 1989, earning a licentiate in dogmatic theology. He served as secretary to Cardinal Jean-Claude Turcotte from 1996 to 1998. From 1998 to 2000 he worked in Rome first at the Secretariat of State and then at the Congregation for Divine Worship and the Discipline of the Sacraments. From 2001 to 2006 he was a member of the formation staff of the major seminary in Montreal, before becoming pastor of Notre-Dame-des-Champs and Purification-de-la-Vierge-Marie-Bienheureuse.

On 11 July 2011, Pope Benedict XVI named him auxiliary bishop of Montreal and titular bishop of Zabi.

He received his episcopal consecration on 10 September from Turcotte.

He served as Episcopal Vicar for Family and Youth.

On 20 March 2012, Pope Benedict appointed him to succeed Turcotte as Archbishop of Montreal. At an 8 a.m. meeting of the College of Consultors on the same day he took canonical possession of the see. A public installation took place on 27 April 2012.

Lépine is the Grand Prior of the Canada-Montréal Lieutenancy of the Equestrian Order of the Holy Sepulchre of Jerusalem.

== See also ==
- Catholic Church in Canada
