= Robert Lebel (bishop) =

Canadian Catholic bishop

- Bishop of Valleyfield
- Church: Catholic Church
- Diocese: Diocese of Valleyfield
- In office: 26 March 1976 – 30 June 2000
- Predecessor: Guy Bélanger
- Successor: Luc Cyr
- Previous posts: Titular Bishop of Alinda (1974-1976); Auxiliary Bishop of Saint-Jean-de-Québec (1974-1976)

Orders
- Ordination: 18 June 1950
- Consecration: 12 May 1974 by Gérard-Marie Coderre

Personal details
- Born: 8 November 1924 Trois-Pistoles, Quebec, Dominion of Canada, British Empire
- Died: 25 May 2015 (aged 90) Salaberry-de-Valleyfield, Quebec, Canada

Robert Lebel (8 November 1924 – 25 May 2015) was a Canadian Catholic bishop.

Born in Trois-Pistoles, Quebec, Canada, Lebel was ordained to the priesthood in 1950 and was appointed titular bishop of Alinda and auxiliary bishop of the Roman Catholic Diocese of Saint-Jean-Longueuil in 1974. In 1976, he was appointed bishop of the Roman Catholic Diocese of Valleyfield and retired in 2000.
