= Basilica Cathedral of St. Cecilia =

Coordinates: 45.25463°N 74.1351°W

Cathedral Basilica of St. Cecilia
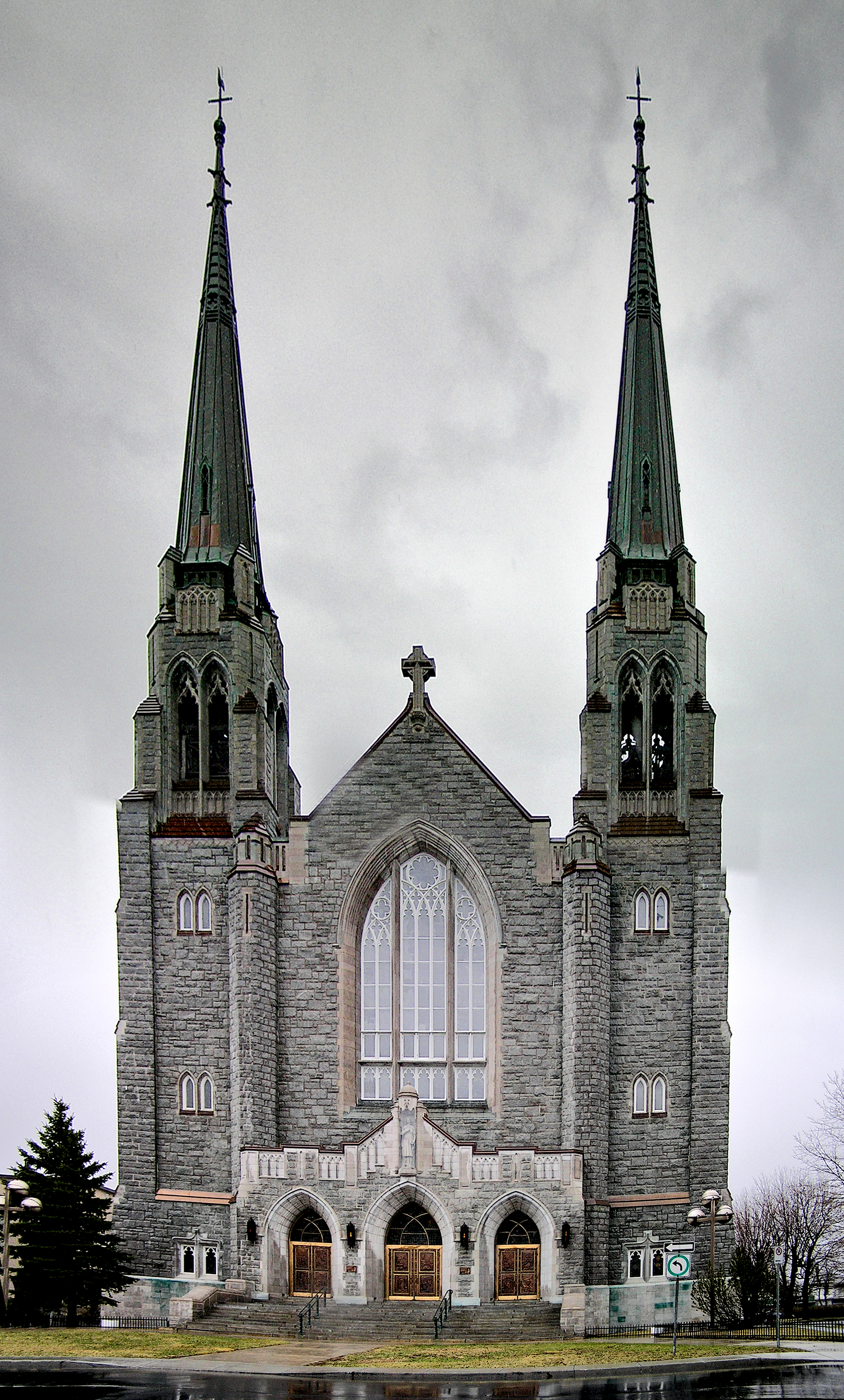
- Front entrance

- Location within Quebec
- Location: Salaberry-de-Valleyfield, Quebec
- Country: Canada
- Denomination: Roman Catholic
- Website: www.basilique-cathedrale.com

History
- Status: Cathedral, minor basilica
- Dedication: Saint Cecilia and Christ the King
- Dedicated: February 9, 1991
- Consecrated: 1985

Architecture
- Functional status: Active
- Architect: Louis-Napoléon Audet Henri Labelle Eugène Perron Jean-Marie Lafleur
- Architectural type: Norman-Gothic
- Style: Neo-Gothic
- Completed: 1935

Specifications
- Capacity: 1500
- Materials: Concrete, rocks

Administration
- Diocese: Valleyfield
- Parish: St. Cecilia

Clergy
- Bishop: Noel Simard
- Priest: Father Normand Bergeron

The Basilica Cathedral of St. Cecilia (Basilique-Cathédrale Sainte-Cécile in French) is a Roman Catholic minor basilica and a cathedral dedicated to St. Cecilia located in Salaberry-de-Valleyfield, Quebec, Canada. The basilica is under the circumscription of the Roman Catholic Diocese of Valleyfield. The basilica was decreed on February 9, 1991.

On September 4, 2002, the cathedral-basilica was heavily damaged by a fire. The Casavant Frères organ, dating to 1935, had to be dismantled as irreparable, and the stained glass windows were badly damaged. The church reopened to parishioners in 2005 with work continuing until 2015. In 2021, the Casavant organ from the deconsecrated Notre-Dame-des-Sept-Allégresses church in Trois-Rivières was moved to the cathedral.
