= Kūh-e Zābī =

Mountain in Afghanistan

Coordinates: 33°27′N 63°54′E

Kūh-e Zābī is a mountain in western Afghanistan. The elevation of the peak is 2,850 meters.
