= Archdiocese of Montreal =

Catholic ecclesiastical territory

Coordinates: 45.4992°N 73.5684°W

Archdiocese of Montreal Archidioecesis Marianopolitanus Archidiocèse de Montréal
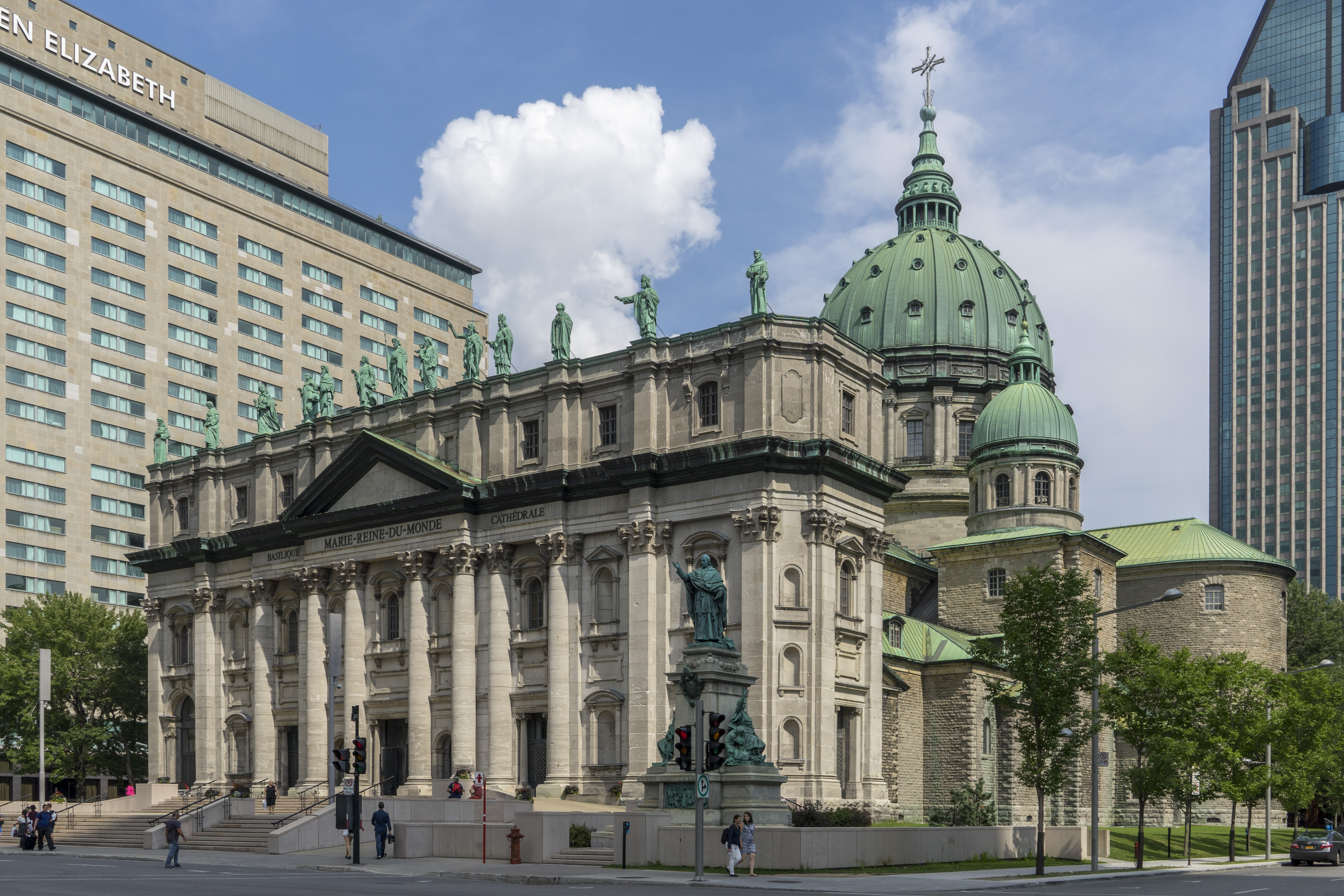
- Mary, Queen of the World Cathedral

- Coat of Arms

- Flag

Location
- Country: Canada
- Territory: Montreal and environs
- Ecclesiastical province: Montreal
- Headquarters: 2000 Sherbrooke St. West
- Population: 1,600,000 (67.9%)

Information
- Denomination: Catholic Church
- Sui iuris church: Latin Church
- Rite: Roman Rite
- Established: May 13, 1836; 189 years ago
- Cathedral: Mary, Queen of the World Cathedral
- Patron saint: St. Mary

Current leadership
- Pope: Leo XIV
- Archbishop: Christian Lépine
- Auxiliary Bishops: Vacant

Map
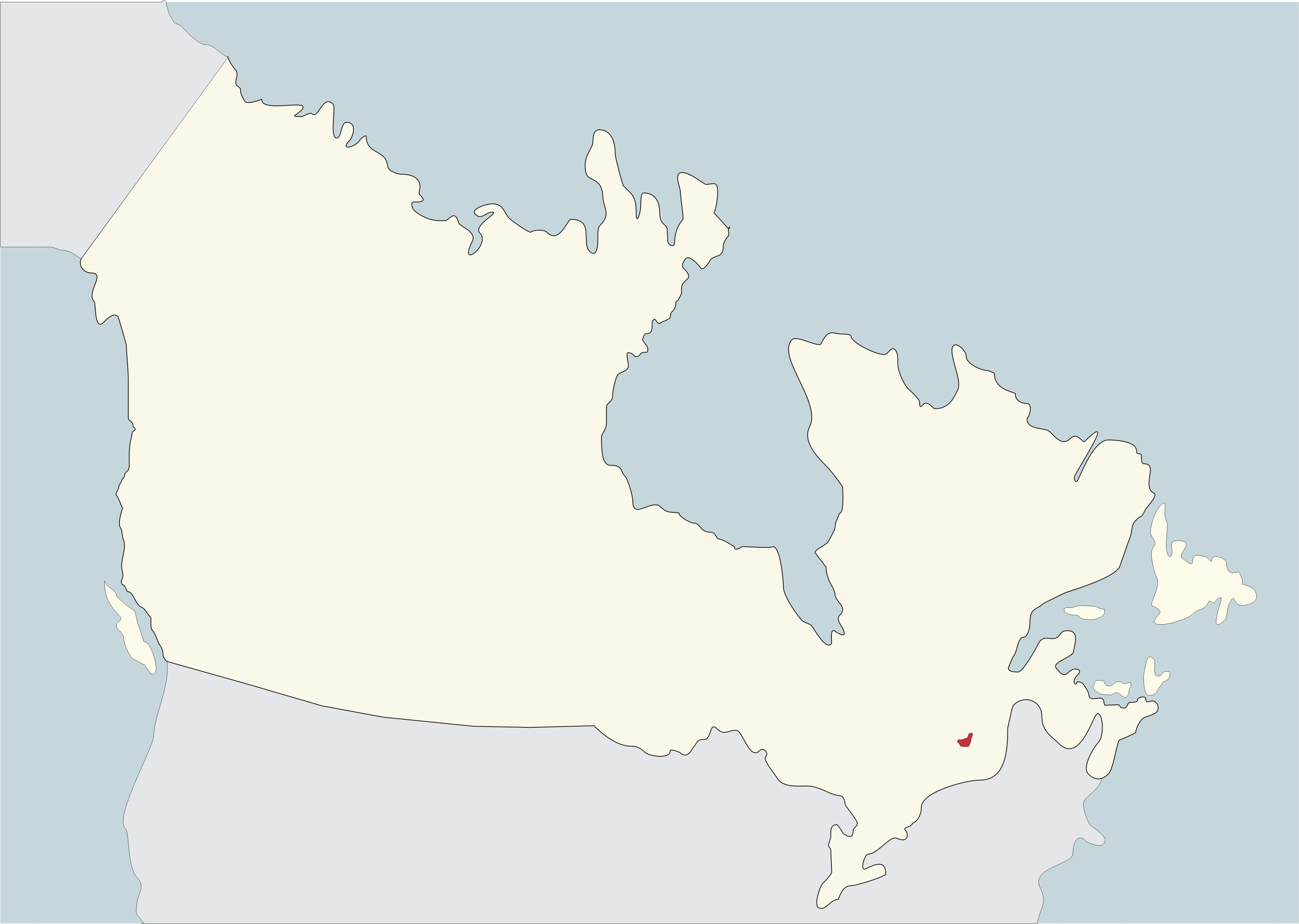
- Location of the archdiocese (red) within Canada

Website
- https://diocesemontreal.org/en/archdiocese

The Archdiocese of Montreal (Latin: Archdioecesis Marianopolitana) is a Latin Church ecclesiastical territory or archdiocese of the Catholic Church in Canada. A metropolitan see, its arch episcopal see is the Montreal, Quebec. It includes Montreal and surrounding areas within Quebec.

== Cathedrals ==
The cathedral of the Archdiocese of Montreal is the Cathedral Basilica of Mary, Queen of the World and St. James the Greater (Basilique cathédrale de Marie-Reine-du-Monde et de Saint-Jacques-le-Majeur), built in 1894.

Previously, the diocese had five cathedrals. From 1821 to 1836, they were the seat of the auxiliary bishop of Quebec in Montreal.

- Notre-Dame Church (ancestor of today's Notre-Dame Basilica), 1821–1822
- Chapel of the Hôtel-Dieu de Montréal, 1822–1825
- Cathédrale Saint-Jacques, 1825–1852 (destroyed by fire, now part of the Judith-Jasmin pavilion of UQAM)
- the chapel of the Asile de la Providence (corner of Sainte-Catherine and Saint-Hubert, site of the present Esplanade Émilie-Gamelin), 1852–1855
- a small chapel at the site of the present archdiocese building, 1855–1894

== History ==
- May 13, 1836: Established as Diocese of Montreal / Marianopolitan(us) (Latin), on territory split off from Archdiocese of Québec
- June 8, 1852: Lost territory to establish Diocese of Saint-Hyacinthe
- June 8, 1886: Promoted as Metropolitan Archdiocese of Montreal / Marianopolitan(us) (Latin)
- April 5, 1892: Lost territory to establish suffragan Diocese of Valleyfield
- January 27, 1904: Lost territory to establish suffragan Diocese of Joliette
- June 9, 1933: Lost territory to establish suffragan Diocese of Saint-Jean-de-Québec
- June 23, 1951: Lost territory to establish suffragan Diocese of Saint-Jérôme
- November 25, 2020: Former Quebec Superior Court Justice Pepita Capriolo released a report which found that some former officials in the Archdiocese of Montreal, including Marc Cardinal Ouellet, Jean-Claude Cardinal Turcotte and Bishop Anthony Mancini took no action against pedophile priest Brian Boucher after receiving reports he sexually abused boys, stating, among other things, that "The primary culprit is the lack of accountability of the people involved in Boucher's education, training and career. Complaints were 'passed on' and no one took responsibility for acting on them." The Catholic church assigned Capriolo to investigate the Archdiocese of Montreal after Boucher pled guilty to sex abuse charges in January 2019 and received an eight year prison sentence.

== Statistics ==
As per 2014, it pastorally served 1,724,357 Catholics (72.3% of 2,386,038 total) on 947 km² in 170 parishes and 35 missions with 901 priests (377 diocesan, 524 religious), 87 deacons, 3,817 lay religious (741 brothers, 3,076 sisters) and 16 seminarians.

== Ecclesiastical province ==
Map of Catholic dioceses of Canada, with Montreal province in orange

The Metropolitan Archbishop of Montreal's province has as suffragan sees:

- Roman Catholic Diocese of Joliette, daughter
- Roman Catholic Diocese of Saint-Jean-Longueuil, daughter
- Roman Catholic Diocese of Saint-Jérôme, daughter
- Roman Catholic Diocese of Valleyfield, daughter.

== Leadership ==
=== Ordinaries ===
Below is a list of individuals who have led the Archdiocese of Montreal and its antecedent jurisdictions since its founding.

==== Bishops of Montreal ====
- Jean-Jacques Lartigue (1836–1840), previously auxiliary Bishop of Quebec in Montreal (1821–1836)
- Ignace Bourget (1840–1876)
- Édouard-Charles Fabre (1876–1886)

==== Archbishops of Montreal ====
- Édouard-Charles Fabre (1886–1896)
- Paul Bruchési (1897–1939)
- Georges Gauthier (1939–1940)
- Joseph Charbonneau (1940–1950)
- Cardinal Paul-Émile Léger (1950–1968)
- Cardinal Paul Grégoire (1968–1990)
- Cardinal Jean-Claude Turcotte (1990–2012)
- Christian Lépine (2012–present)

=== Coadjutor archbishops ===
Under the Code of Canon Law, the coadjutor bishop has the right of succession (cum jure successionis) upon the death, retirement or resignation of the diocesan bishop he is assisting. All coadjutor ordinaries except for John Charles Prince and Joseph La Rocque eventually succeeded to become head of the Archdiocese of Montreal or its antecedent jurisdictions.

- Ignace Bourget (1837–1840), as coadjutor bishop
- John Charles Prince (1844–1852), as coadjutor bishop; did not succeed, appointed Bishop of Saint-Hyacinthe
- Joseph La Rocque (1852-1860), as coadjutor bishop: did not succeed, appointed Bishop of Saint-Hyacinthe
- Édouard-Charles Fabre (1873–1876), as coadjutor bishop
- Georges Gauthier (1923–1939)
- Joseph Charbonneau (1940)

=== Auxiliary episcopate ===
1. Auxiliary Bishop Frank Leo (later Archbishop of Toronto) (2022.09.12 – 2023.02.11)
2. Auxiliary Bishop Alain Faubert (2016.04.19 – 2024.09.12), Titular Bishop of Vicus Pacati, appointed Bishop of Valleyfield
3. Auxiliary Bishop Thomas Dowd (later Bishop of Sault Ste. Marie) (2011.07.11 –2020.10.22)
4. Auxiliary Bishop: Christian Lépine (later Archbishop) (2011.07.11 – 2012.03.20)
5. Auxiliary Bishop: André Gazaille (2006.02.11 – 2011.07.11)
6. Auxiliary Bishop: Lionel Gendron, P.S.S. (2006.02.11 – 2010.10.28)
7. Auxiliary Bishop: Anthony Mancini (later Archbishop of Halifax-Yarmouth) (1999.02.18 – 2007.10.18)
8. Auxiliary Bishop: Louis Dicaire (1999.02.18 – 2004.06.19)
9. Auxiliary Bishop: André Rivest (1995.06.27 – 2004.06.19)
10. Auxiliary Bishop: Neil E. Willard (1995.06.27 – 1998.03.25)
11. Auxiliary Bishop: Jean-Claude Turcotte (later Archbishop and Cardinal) (1982.04.14 – 1990.03.17)
12. Auxiliary Bishop: Jude Saint-Antoine (1981.03.20 – 2006.02.11)
13. Auxiliary Bishop: Gérard Tremblay, P.S.S. (1981.03.20 – 1991.08.27)
14. Auxiliary Bishop: Jean-Marie Lafontaine (1979.04.18 – 1981.06.03)
15. Auxiliary Bishop: Leonard James Crowley (1971.02.08 – 1997.03.26)
16. Auxiliary Bishop: Norman Joseph Gallagher (1966 – 1970.04.16)
17. Auxiliary Bishop: Adrien André Maria Cimichella, O.S.M. (1964.06.05 – 1996.04.25)
18. Auxiliary Bishop: Paul Grégoire (later Archbishop and Cardinal) (1961.10.26 – 1968.04.20)
19. Auxiliary Bishop: Léo Blais (1959.03.18 – 1971.05.11)
20. Auxiliary Bishop: Valérien Bélanger (1956.03.16 – 1983.02.19)
21. Auxiliary Bishop: Laurent Morin (1955.09.08 – 1959.02.28)
22. Auxiliary Bishop: Lawrence-Patrick Whelan (1941.06.28 – 1980.10.04)
23. Auxiliary Bishop: Joseph-Conrad Chaumont (1941.06.28 – 1966.10.08)
24. Auxiliary Bishop: Alphonse-Emmanuel Deschamps (1925.02.20 – 1940.06.23)
25. Auxiliary Bishop: Georges Gauthier (later Archbishop) (1912.06.28 – 1923.04.05)
26. Auxiliary Bishop: François-Théophile-Zotique Racicot (1905.01.14 – 1915.09.14)

=== Other priests of this diocese who became bishops ===
- Charles-François-Calixte Morisson, appointed Coadjutor Bishop of Vancouver Island, British Columbia in 1862 (resigned from episcopate)
- Louis-Zéphirin Moreau, appointed Bishop of Saint-Hyacinthe, Québec, in 1875; beatified in 1987
- Narcisse Zéphirin Lorrain, appointed Vicar Apostolic of Pontiac, Ontario in 1882
- Richard Alphonsus O’Connor, appointed Bishop of Peteborough, Ontario in 1889
- Joseph-Médard Émard, appointed Bishop of Valleyfield, Québec in 1892
- Joseph-Guillaume-Laurent Forbes, appointed Bishop of Joliette, Québec in 1913
- Peter Joseph Monahan, appointed Bishop of Calgary, Alberta in 1932
- Émilien Frenette, appointed Bishop of Saint-Jérôme, Québec in 1951
- Alexander Carter, appointed Coadjutor Bishop of Sault Sainte Marie, Ontario in 1956
- William Edward Power, appointed Bishop of Antigonish, Nova Scotia in 1960
- Gerald Emmett Carter, appointed Auxiliary Bishop of London, Ontario in 1961; future Cardinal
- Charles-Omer Valois, appointed Bishop of Saint-Jérôme, Québec in 1977
- Robert Harris, appointed Auxiliary Bishop of Sault Sainte Marie, Ontario in 2002
- Paul Terrio (priest here, 1970-2001), appointed Bishop of Saint Paul in Alberta in 2012

== See also ==
- List of Catholic dioceses in Canada
- Grey Nuns
- Centre justice et foi
- Villa Saint Martin

== Sources ==
- Auclair, Élie Joseph (1911). "Archdiocese of Montreal" . In Herbermann, Charles (ed.). Catholic Encyclopedia. Vol. 10. New York: Robert Appleton Company.
- GCatholic, with Google map - data for all sections
- catholichierarchy.org retrieved July 13, 2006
